= List of municipalities of the Province of Pordenone =

This is a list of the 50 municipalities (comuni) of the former Province of Pordenone in the autonomous region of Friuli-Venezia Giulia in Italy.

== List ==
Municipality	Population (2026)	Area (km²)	Density
Andreis	243	26.95	9.0
Arba	1,344	15.31	87.8
Aviano	8,973	113.35	79.2
Azzano Decimo	15,760	51.34	307.0
Barcis	225	103.41	2.2
Brugnera	9,192	29.12	315.7
Budoia	2,561	37.36	68.5
Caneva	6,194	41.79	148.2
Casarsa della Delizia	8,314	20.47	406.2
Castelnovo del Friuli	800	22.48	35.6
Cavasso Nuovo	1,463	10.60	138.0
Chions	4,991	33.45	149.2
Cimolais	343	100.86	3.4
Claut	855	165.91	5.2
Clauzetto	385	28.31	13.6
Cordenons	17,701	56.34	314.2
Cordovado	2,671	12.02	222.2
Erto e Casso	359	52.43	6.8
Fanna	1,467	10.26	143.0
Fiume Veneto	11,806	35.76	330.1
Fontanafredda	12,952	46.40	279.1
Frisanco	599	60.99	9.8
Maniago	11,444	69.46	164.8
Meduno	1,480	31.59	46.9
Montereale Valcellina	4,187	67.88	61.7
Morsano al Tagliamento	2,754	32.54	84.6
Pasiano di Pordenone	7,890	45.60	173.0
Pinzano al Tagliamento	1,493	21.95	68.0
Polcenigo	3,060	49.69	61.6
Porcia	14,947	29.53	506.2
Pordenone	52,744	38.21	1,380.4
Prata di Pordenone	8,353	22.96	363.8
Pravisdomini	3,471	16.21	214.1
Roveredo in Piano	5,760	15.86	363.2
Sacile	19,947	32.74	609.3
San Giorgio della Richinvelda	4,541	48.15	94.3
San Martino al Tagliamento	1,517	17.98	84.4
San Quirino	4,333	51.76	83.7
San Vito al Tagliamento	15,293	60.88	251.2
Sequals	2,212	27.70	79.9
Sesto al Reghena	6,299	40.68	154.8
Spilimbergo	11,799	71.88	164.1
Tramonti di Sopra	274	125.15	2.2
Tramonti di Sotto	335	85.55	3.9
Travesio	1,809	28.38	63.7
Vajont	1,599	1.59	1,005.7
Valvasone Arzene	3,960	29.68	133.4
Vito d'Asio	705	53.72	13.1
Vivaro	1,350	37.68	35.8
Zoppola	8,360	45.54	183.6

== See also ==
- List of municipalities of Friuli-Venezia Giulia
- List of municipalities of Italy
