= Christian Congregation in Brazil =

First evangelical church in brazil

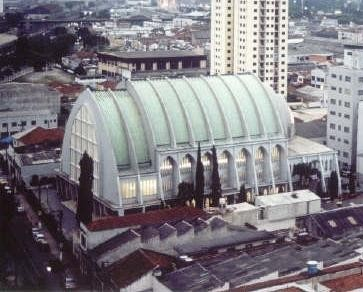
- Full communion: Assemblies of God in Italy; Canadian Assemblies of God; International Fellowship of Christian Assemblies
- Founder: Luigi Francescon
- Origin: 1910; Santo Antônio da Platina (PR)
- Congregations: 24.272 in Brazil (2021)
- Members: 2.5 million (2000); 2.8 million (2016)
- Official website: congregacaocristanobrasil.org.br

The Christian Congregation in Brazil (Portuguese: Congregação Cristã no Brasil) was founded in Brazil by the Italian-American missionary Luigi Francescon (1866–1964), as part of the larger Christian Congregation movement.

== History ==
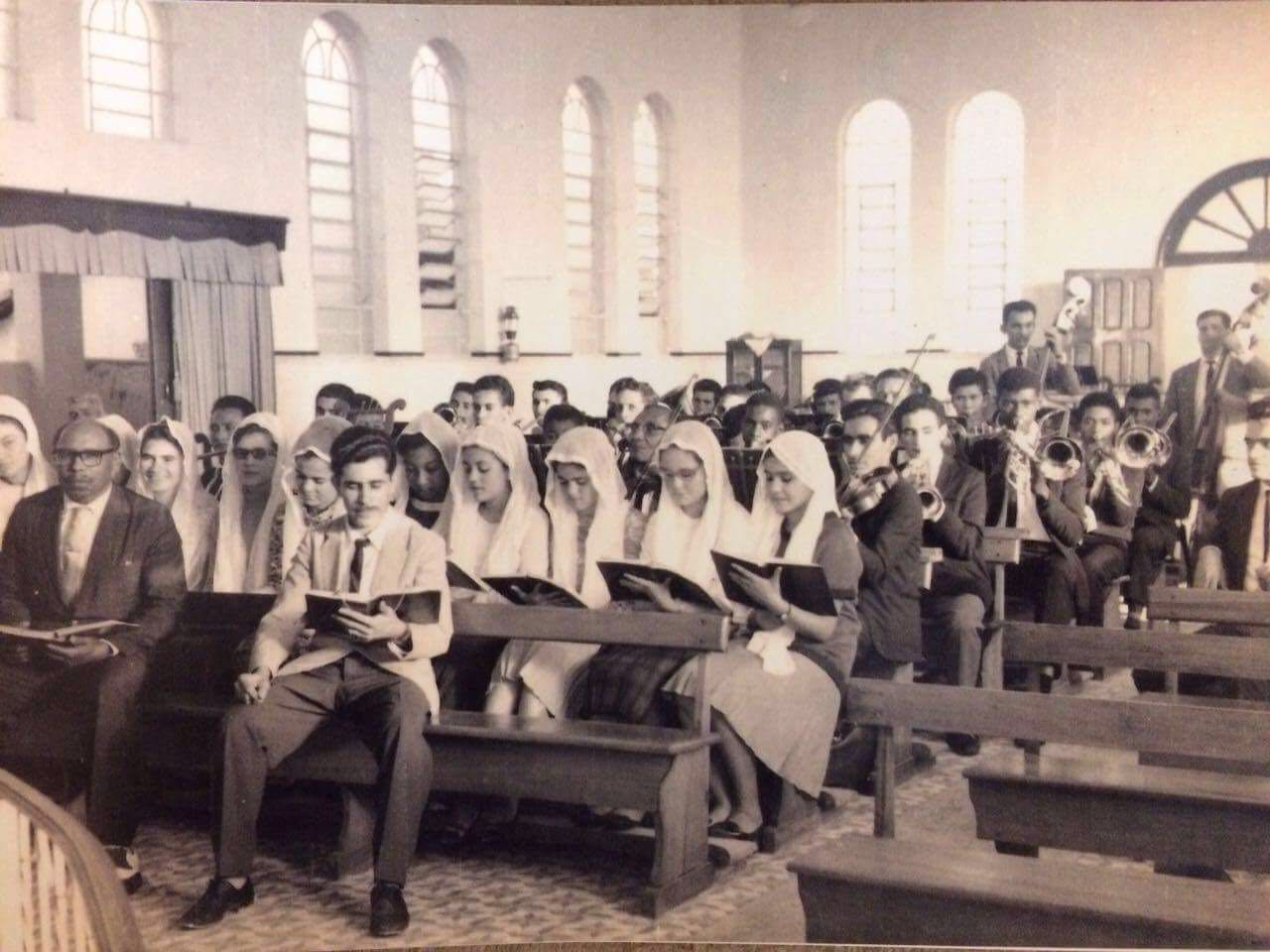
Old Headquarters in Guaianases, São Paulo in 1950

Louis Francescon came for the first time to Brazil from Chicago, Illinois in 1910. After arriving in São Paulo, Francescon went to Santo Antonio da Plantina, Paraná. His eleven missionary trips were quite successful among fellow Italian immigrants and Brazilian nationals. The Christian Congregation of Brazil is one of the most dynamic and it is fast-growing. In 2016, the Christian Congregation in the Brazil had around 2.8 million members in 2020 and 24,272 temples (2021) in that country and more than 50,000 temples in all world and an intense missionary work abroad. In the metro area of São Paulo, the church shows its strength: there are 500,000 followers, distributed in 2,000 churches and a mother-church in the Brás district that houses a 9,800 member congregation in the Brás district. Francescon was among the early founders of the Italian-American Pentecostal church in Chicago. He had left the First Italian Presbyterian Church of Chicago because of his belief in Water Baptism by immersion. Later, he accepted the doctrines of anointing with oil, miracles, and Holy Spirit baptism at the North Avenue Full Gospel Mission led by William Howard Durham. Evangelists from Chicago went to the Italian colonies in the United States planting churches mostly in the Northeast. Most of those churches were incorporated into the Christian Church of North America, with a few affiliated with the Christian Congregation in the United States.

== Music and orchestras ==
Music plays a central role in the worship practices of the Christian Congregation in Brazil, with large instrumental orchestras accompanying congregational hymn singing in services. These ensembles, present in congregations throughout the country, emphasize acoustic wind and brass instrumentation, including flutes, clarinets, trumpets, trombones, and multiple saxophones, and form a significant component of the church’s liturgical life and collective identity.

Ethnomusicological research notes the regular presence of extended-range instruments include members of the saxophone family that are discussed in depth in the articles on the contrabass saxophone and subcontrabass saxophone, where they uniquely serve functional bass roles in large wind groups rather than being used solely as novelties.
