= Claut =

Claut Cjolt (Friulian)
- Comune
- Comune di Claut
- Location within Italy Location within Friuli-Venezia Giulia
- Coordinates: 46°16′N 12°31′E
- Country: Italy
- Region: Friuli-Venezia Giulia
- Province: Pordenone (PN)
- Frazioni: Cellino di sopra, Cellino di sotto, Contròn, Creppi, Lesis, Matàn, Pinedo, Stoc, Vit

Government
  - Mayor: Gionata Sturam

Area
  - Total: 166.3 km^{2} (64.2 sq mi)
- Elevation: 613 m (2,011 ft)

Population (31 December 2010)
  - Total: 1,027
  - Density: 6.176/km^{2} (15.99/sq mi)
- Demonym: Clautani or Clautàns
- Time zone: UTC+1 (CET)
  - Summer (DST): UTC+2 (CEST)
- Postal code: 33080
- Dialing code: 0427
- Website: Official website

Claut (Western Friulian: Cjolt) is a comune (municipality) in the Regional decentralization entity of Pordenone in the Italian region of Friuli-Venezia Giulia, located about 120 kilometres (75 mi) northwest of Trieste and about 35 kilometres (22 mi) northwest of Pordenone.

Claut borders the following municipalities: Barcis, Chies d'Alpago, Cimolais, Erto e Casso, Forni di Sopra, Forni di Sotto, Frisanco, Pieve d'Alpago, Tramonti di Sopra.

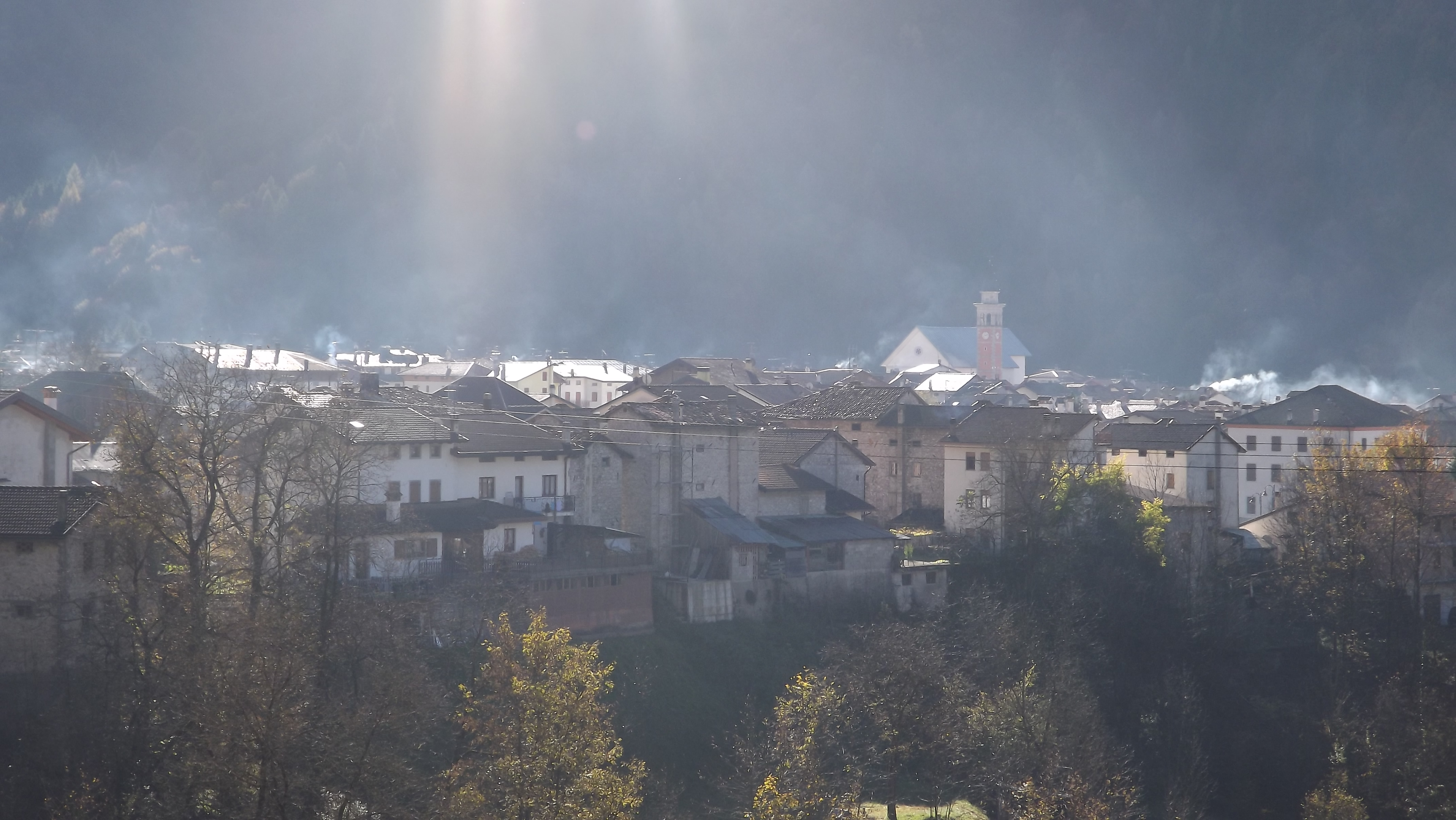
The town

== People ==
- Dario Grava
- Roger Grava
