= Roncadin =

- Type: Benefit corporation
- Industry: Food
- Founded: 1992
- Founder: Edoardo Roncadin, Siro Roncadin, Renzo Roncadin
- Headquarters: Meduno, Italy
- Key people: Dario Roncadin (CEO)
- Products: Frozen pizza
- Revenue: €250 million (2025)
- Number of employees: 850
- Subsidiaries: Roncadin USA Inc.; RONCALab
- Website: www.roncadin.it

Roncadin is an Italian food company specializing in the production of frozen pizzas for private labels. Founded in 1992 in Meduno, Friuli Venezia Giulia, the company operates production sites in Italy and the United States and exports primarily to the United Kingdom, Germany, and the United States.

== History ==
Roncadin was established in 1992 in Meduno, Pordenone province, by three brothers Edoardo Roncadin, Siro Roncadin, and Renzo Roncadin, who had previously worked in the restaurant industry and ice cream industries in Germany. The company reached an annual output of 30 million pizzas in 1995.

In 2010, a major energy efficiency plan is launched, including the installation of photovoltaic panels at the Meduno plant. In 2013 a commercial branch was opened in the United States.

In September 2017 a major fire destroyed four lines at their Meduno facility.

In 2024, Roncadin adopted the "Società Benefit" legal status under Italian law. In 2022, it acquired a fresh dough company in Sommacampagna, establishing Zero Srl. In 2024, the company opened a plant in Chicago under Roncadin USA Inc. In 2025, production surpassed 100 million pizzas. In 2025, Zero Srl was restructured as RONCALab.

== Operations ==
Roncadin produces frozen pizzas, primarily for private labels, and develops around 70 new recipes annually, with a portfolio of more than 560 variations. In 2024, a co-branded premium frozen pizza line was launched in partnership with L’Antica Pizzeria Da Michele.

The company's headquarters and main production facility are located in Meduno. Research and development activities are carried out through RONCALab, based in Sommacampagna. Roncadin opened a commercial branch in Chicago in 2013. In 2024, it established a production facility in Chicago, where pizza production began in November 2024.

Roncadin employs about 850 people, with an average age of 43.5. Women make up approximately 78% of the workforce, and 12% are under the age of 30. The chief executive officer is Dario Roncadin, son of co-founder Edoardo Roncadin. RONCALab is led by Christian Del Ben, a member of the family's third generation.

In 2014, Roncadin received the Coop for Kyoto Award in the category of sustainable energy. The company also received several awards for sustainability and corporate governance, including the Better Future Award in 2022, the CEOforLIFE Award and Sustainability Award in 2023, and the Industria Felix Award in 2024. In 2023, CEO Dario Roncadin received the EY Entrepreneur of the Year Award for Global Growth.

== Public activities ==
Roncadin has been involved in various social and community initiatives, including school education programs, internships, biodiversity projects, and donations to local organizations. The company also raised funds to support Ukraine in 2022 and has participated in annual fundraising for Telethon Udine. The same year, it launched a beekeeping and biodiversity project that included the adoption of 650,000 bees for educational and environmental purposes. Roncadin supports educational programs through the project A scuola con Roncadin, which offers factory visits and workshops for students. It also provides summer internships and company visits aimed at career orientation. Since 2024, it has supported local organizations assisting women in difficulty, and in 2025, it introduced an employee-driven initiative allowing staff to vote on which non-profit organizations receive company donations.
