= Villa Cigolotti =

Facility located in the Municipality of Vivaro

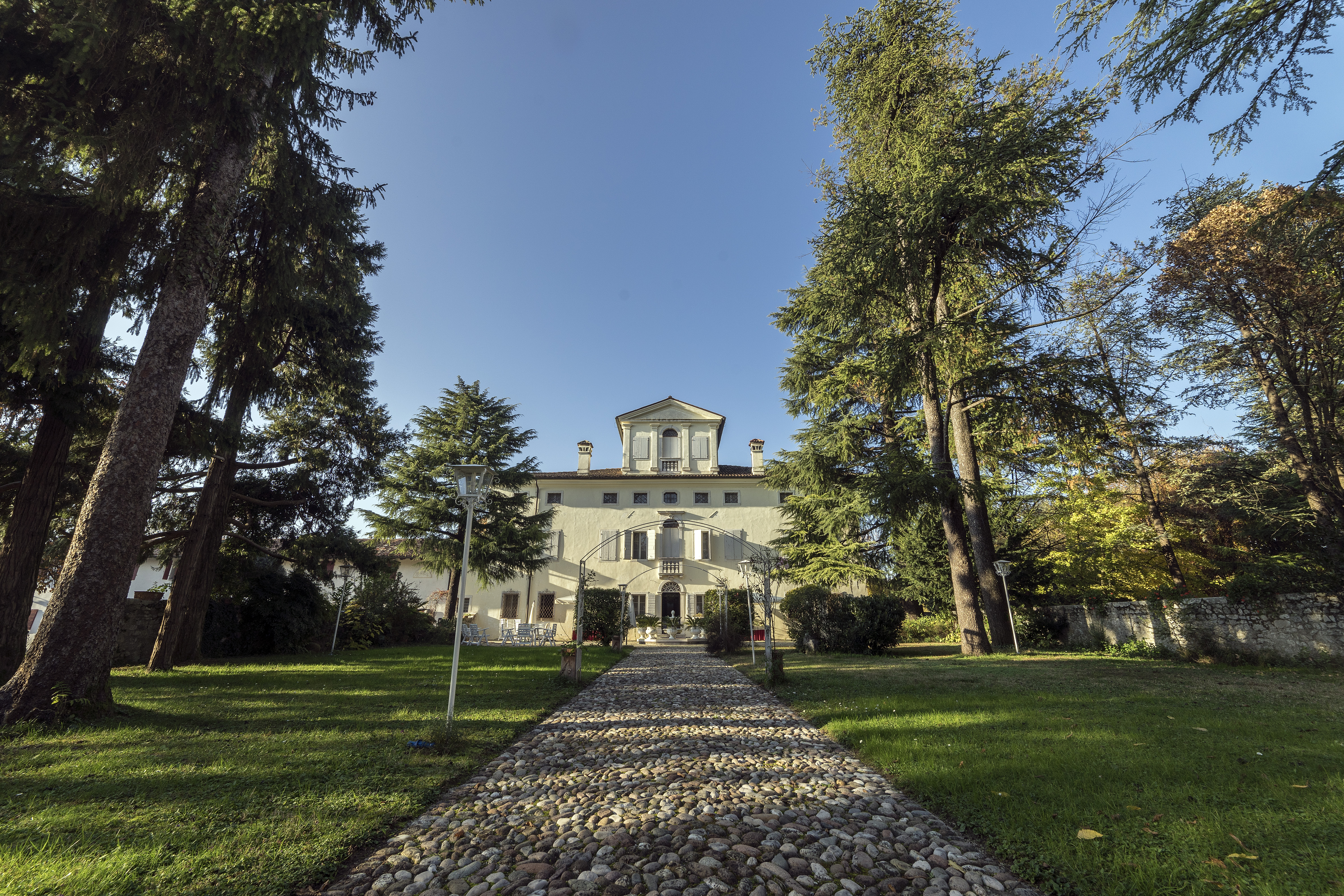
Villa Cigolotti - External Facade and main entrance

Villa Cigolotti is an historical facility located in the Municipality of Vivaro, Province of Pordenone, in the Friuli-Venezia Giulia Region on the north eastern part of Italy.

The Villa takes its name from the first owner and commissioner: the Counts Cigolotti family.

From the year 1740 of its foundation for the following 250 years, the Villa has been used as private housing facility by the different owners that alternated across the decades.

Nowadays, Villa Cigolotti serves as hotel and hospitality facility for events.

== History ==
=== Foundation ===
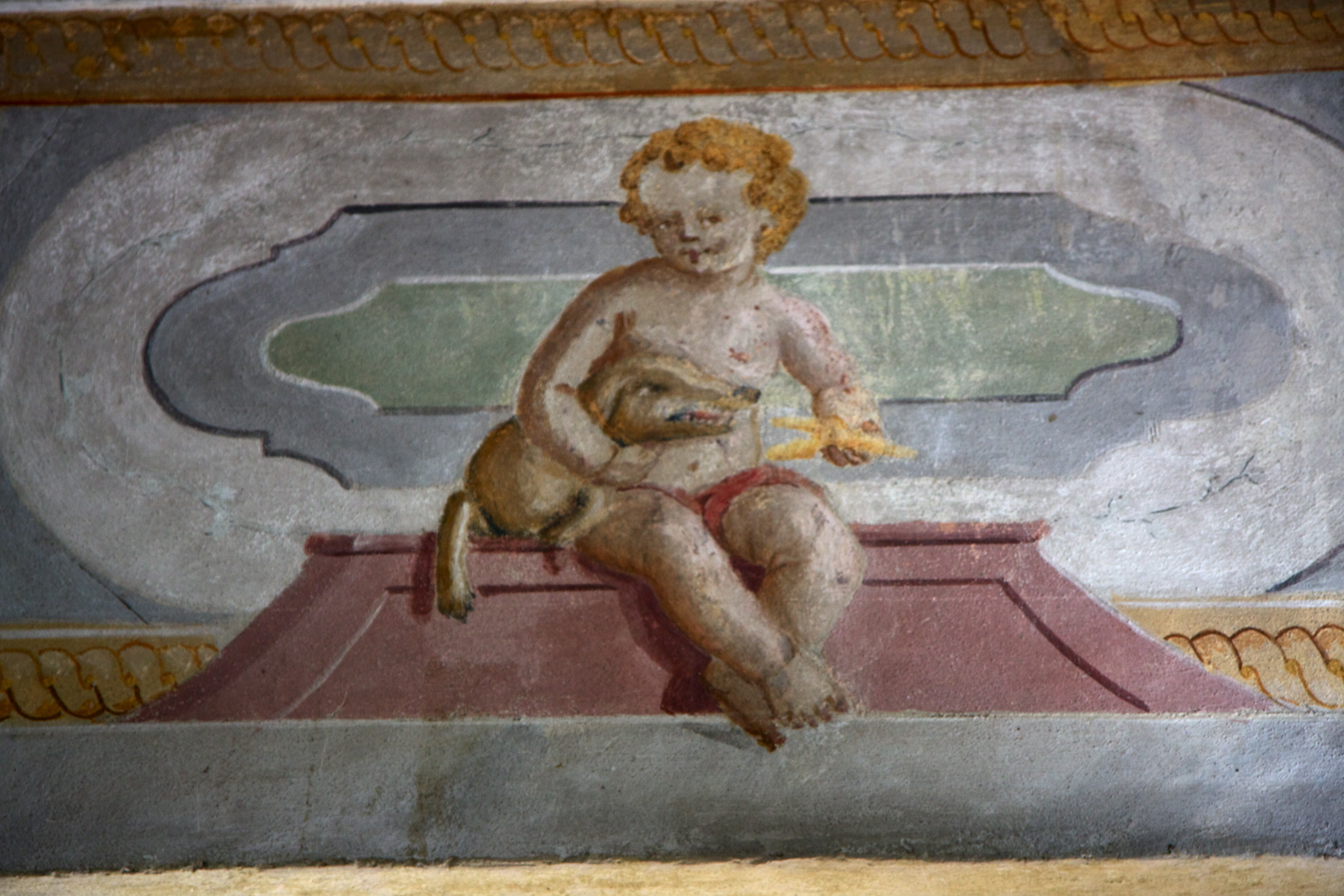
Fresco in the Room of the Cherubs

The story of Villa Cigolotti starts in 1740, when the aristocratic family of the Counts Cigolotti commanded the construction of a Venetian Villa in the western Friuli region, where they operated their business.

The Cigolotti family was active in the sector of wood supplying to the Venetian Republic. They were provisioning the row material in the forest of north-western Friulian pre-Alps, material that was then delivered to Venice by water ways (the rivers).

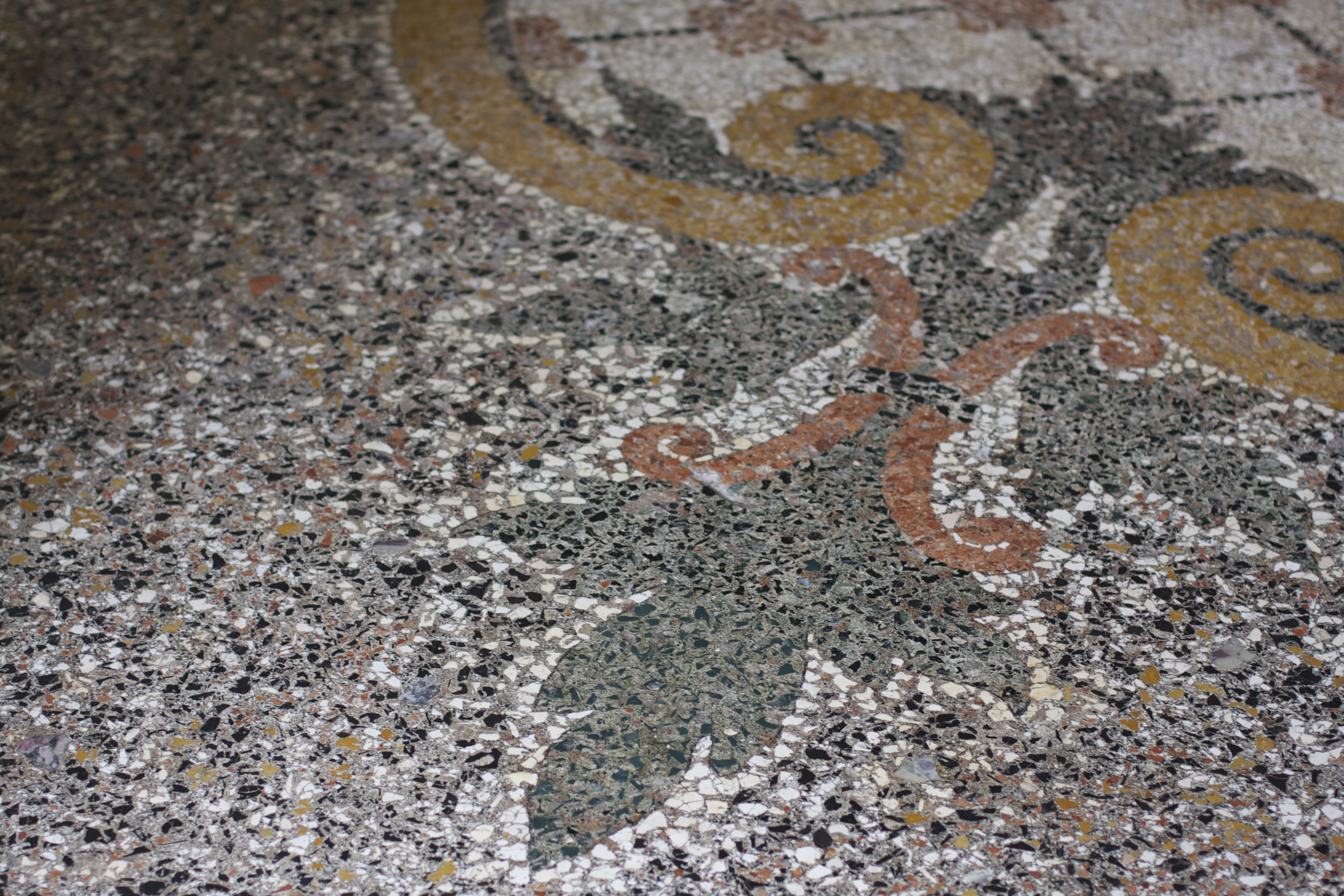
Pavement in mosaic - Detail.

By 1740 the business was flourishing, as well as the personal income of the family; so forth the Cigolotti could afford a summer residence in Basaldella di Vivaro. The location was very convenient since positioned not too far from the mountains and just in between the beds of the two small rivers Meduna and Cellina and close to the bigger river Tagliamento, which provided practical transport routes.

=== Installation period ===
At the beginning, the Villa was inhabited by the Cigolotti family only during their vacation season. The precious mosaics decorating the floors of the mansion can be traced back to this initial period of its history.

By the end of the 18th century, the property underwent some structural enlargements to host the family and the servants all year around, in order for them to be more present on their business’ location.

It was during the 19th century that the decorative frescos were painted on the walls of the Villa with a delicate neo-Pompeian style.

By the half of the 19th century, the Cigolotti family moved out of Vivaro and, from then on, the Venetian Villa changed several local owners.

=== Recent years ===
By the second half of the 20th century, in the period between the Second World War and the end of the century, Villa Cigolotti remained under a state of severe abandonment causing serious damages to the facility.

In 1996, Villa Cigolotti was acquired by a private owner that supported a four-years-long restoration process of the historical architecture, under the supervision of the Ministry for the Arts and Cultural Heritage's local division.

Nowadays this Venetian Villa has been fully restored at the best of its original shape and serves as hospitality facility.

=== References ===
- Various Authors, La cultura della Villa. Il Friuli Occidentale e Venezia nel ‘700, Pordenone, Biblioteca dell’Immagine, 1988
- Various Authors, Ville venete: la Regione Friuli Venezia Giulia, Marsilio Publishers, Venice, 2005
- Frederic C. Lane, Venice. A Maritime Republic, The Johns Hopkins University Press, 1973
