= Louis Francescon =

Italian Pentecostal missionary

Luigi Franscescon
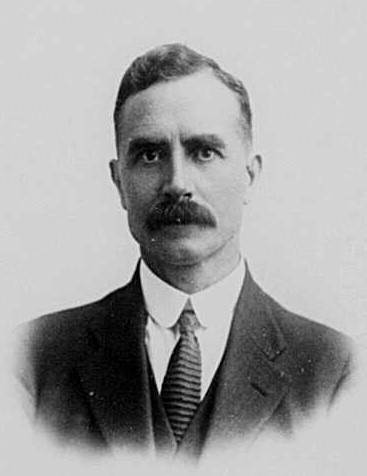
- Louis Francescon
- Born: March 29, 1866; Cavasso Nuovo, Italy
- Died: September 7, 1964 (aged 98); Oak Park, Illinois, United States
- Occupations: missionary and evangelist

Louis Francescon (March 29, 1866 – September 7, 1964) was a missionary and pioneer of the Italian Pentecostal Movement. Several Pentecostal denominations and fellowships acknowledge him as their founder, including the Christian Church of North America (now named International Fellowship of Christian Assemblies), the Christian Assembly in Argentina, the Assemblies of God in Italy, the Christian Congregation in the United States, and the Christian Congregation of Brazil.

== Biography ==
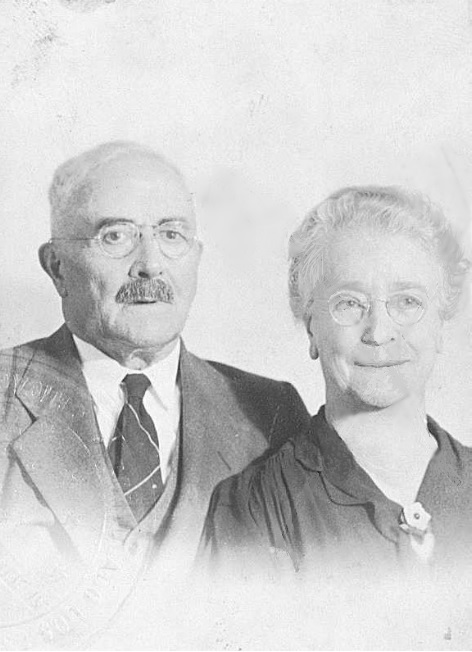
Louis Francescon with his wife Rosina Balzano in 1947

Coming from a poor family, he was the son of Pietro Francescon (born in 1830 in Cavasso Nuovo of Antonio Francescon and Elisabetta Zanussi) and Maria Lovisa (born in 1844 in Cavasso Nuovo of Osvaldo Lovisa and Angela Serena). He did not complete high school. Francescon was born in Cavasso Nuovo, a small village in the Province of Pordenone, Italy, and emigrated to the United States in 1890, settling in Chicago. He converted to a Waldensian-Presbyterian mission that later was incorporated as the First Italian Presbyterian Church of Chicago.

In 1907, Francescon had contact with the North Avenue Full Gospel Mission, pastored by William Howard Durham, and accepted Pentecostalism. William Durham had prophesied that Francescon had been divinely appointed to bring the Pentecostal message to the Italian people. He was elected one of the elders of the Assemblea Cristiana, an independent evangelical Italian church which had embraced Pentecostal teaching and became the mother-church for the Italian Pentecostal movement.

Francescon started churches in Los Angeles, St. Louis, and Philadelphia before departing on missions abroad. He went to Argentina, Brazil and Europe. From his work emerged several denominations, such as the Christian Church of North America and the Christian Congregation of Brazil. However, Francescon was opposed to formally organizing a denomination, and he eventually left the CCNA. Some CCNA congregations followed him and became known as the Christian Congregations. They retain much of Francescon's nondenominational emphasis. At the time of his death in 1964, he was serving as the senior elder of the Christian Congregation Church in Chicago.

== Publications ==
- Faithful Testimony. Self-published, Chicago 1948, 1952.
