= Tambre =

- Comune
- Comune di Tambre
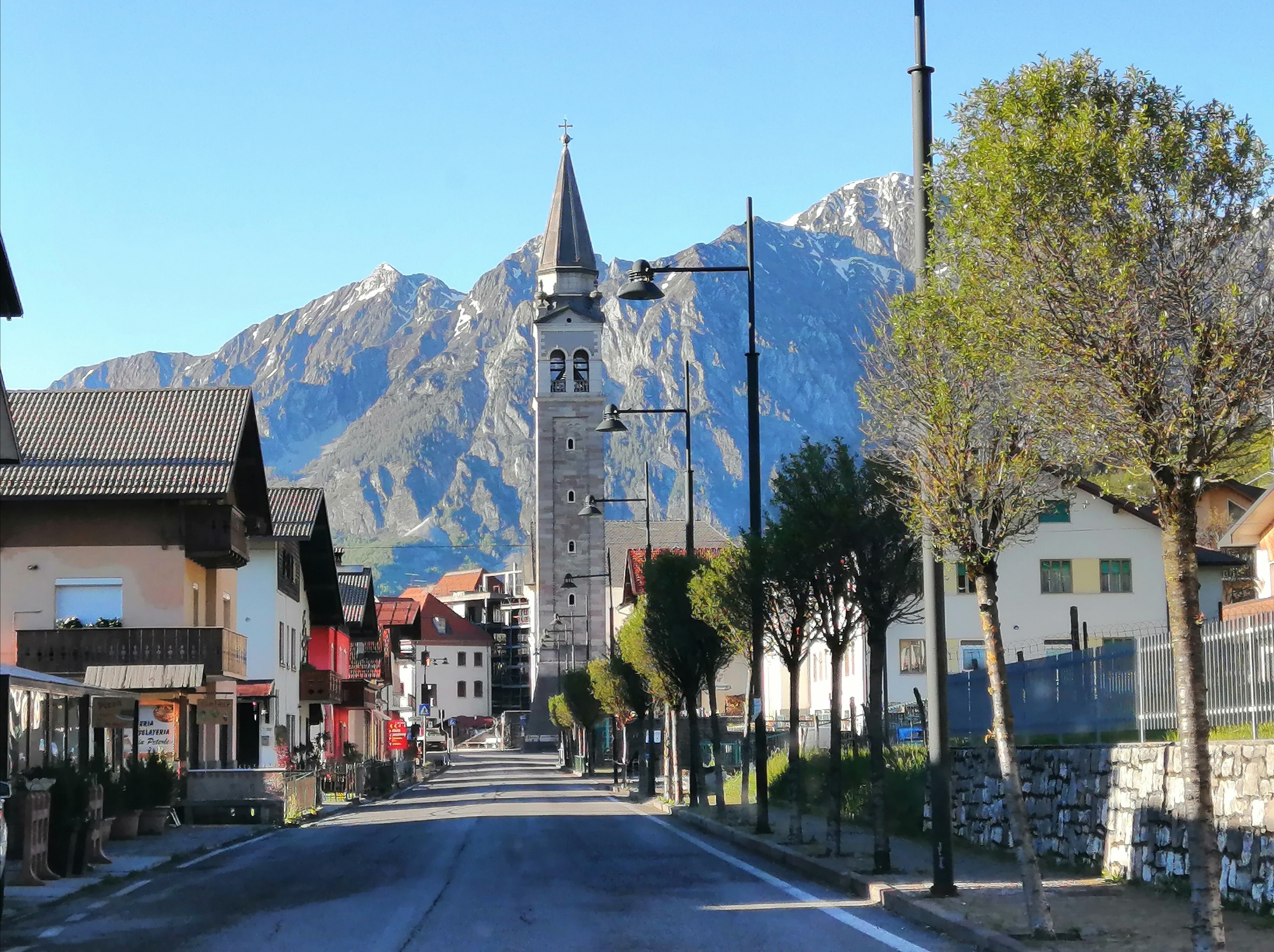
- Main street of Tambre

- Coat of arms

- Location within Italy Location within Veneto
- Coordinates: 46°8′N 12°25′E
- Country: Italy
- Region: Veneto
- Province: Belluno (BL)
- Frazioni: All'O, Benedet, Borsoi, Brolio, Broz, Buraci, Campon, Canaie, Cansiglio, Civit, Col Indes, Federa, Frassenei, Fullin, Lavina, Malolt, Micei, Moretti, Pianon, Pian Osteria, Sant'Anna, Scurzan, Soralavina, Tambruz, Valdenogher, Valmenera, Valturcana, Vivaio

Government
  - Mayor: Sara Bona

Area
  - Total: 45.6 km^{2} (17.6 sq mi)
- Elevation: 922 m (3,025 ft)

Population (31 December 2016)
  - Total: 1,358
  - Density: 29.8/km^{2} (77.1/sq mi)
- Demonym: Tambresi
- Time zone: UTC+1 (CET)
  - Summer (DST): UTC+2 (CEST)
- Postal code: 32010
- Dialing code: 0437
- Website: Official website

Tambre is a comune (municipality) in the Province of Belluno in the Italian region Veneto, located about 80 kilometres (50 miles) north of Venice and about 15 km (9 mi) east of Belluno.

Tambre borders the following municipalities: Aviano, Barcis, Budoia, Caneva, Chies d'Alpago, Alpago, Fregona, Polcenigo, Puos d'Alpago.
