= Andreis, Italy =

Comune in Friuli-Venezia Giulia

Andreis Andrees (Friulian)
- Comune
- Comune di Andreis
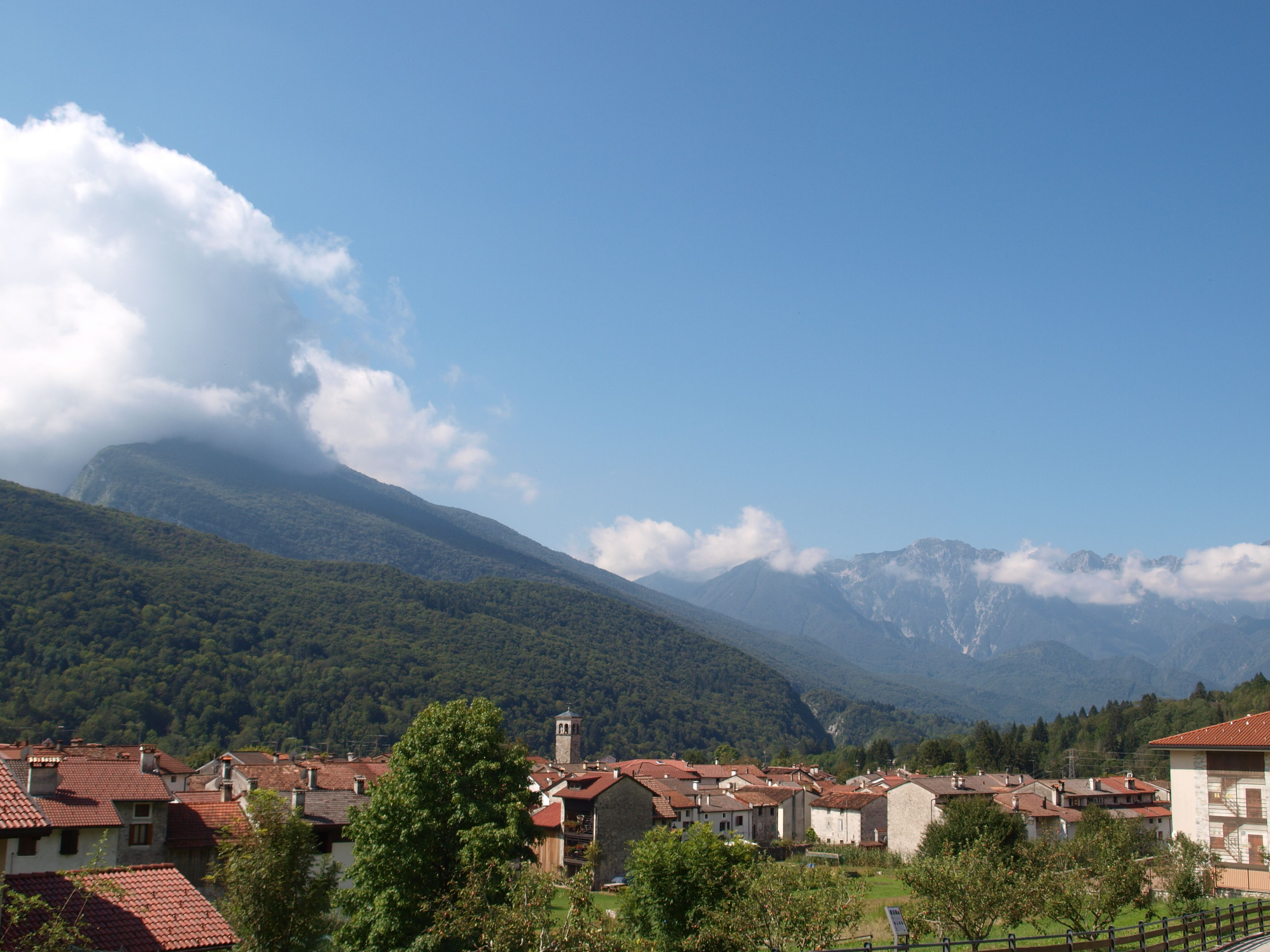

- Coat of arms

- Location of Andreis in Italy Andreis (Friuli-Venezia Giulia)
- Coordinates: 46°12′N 12°37′E
- Country: Italy
- Region: Friuli-Venezia Giulia
- Province: Pordenone (PN)
- Frazioni: Alcheda, Bosplans, Prapiero, Rompagnel, Sot Ancas

Government
  - Mayor: Romero Alzetta

Area
  - Total: 26.95 km^{2} (10.41 sq mi)
- Elevation: 455 m (1,493 ft)

Population (31 December 2017)
  - Total: 248
  - Density: 9.20/km^{2} (23.8/sq mi)
- Demonym: Andreani
- Time zone: UTC+1 (CET)
  - Summer (DST): UTC+2 (CEST)
- Postal code: 33080
- Dialing code: 0427
- ISTAT code: 093001
- Website: Official website

Andreis (Western Friulian: Andrees) is a comune (municipality) in the Regional decentralization entity of Pordenone in the Italian region of Friuli-Venezia Giulia, located about 110 kilometres (68 mi) northwest of Trieste and about 25 kilometres (16 mi) north of Pordenone.

Andreis borders the following municipalities: Barcis, Frisanco, Maniago, Montereale Valcellina.
