= Casasola, Italy =

Village in Friuli-Venezia Giulia, Italy

Coordinates: 46.2230°N 12.7280°E

Casasola with part of Monte Raut in the background

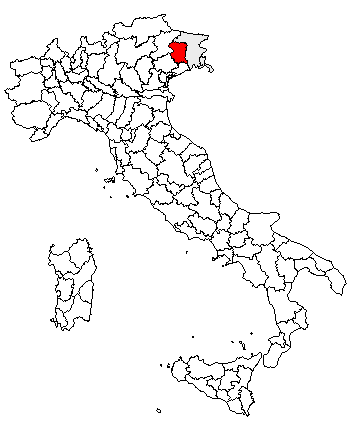
Location of the province of Pordenone

Casasola is a village in Friuli-Venezia Giulia in northeast Italy. It is a località of the comune of Frisanco, in the province of Pordenone.

== Geography ==
Casasola has only 40 inhabitants, compared to 450 at its peak in the 1850s. It lies in the Val Colvera.

== History ==
Casasola was founded in 1480 by Luca and Marco di Rosa (hence the root name Rosa which continues to be the family name of most of the families from Casasola) from the town of Maniago, approximately 8 kilometres (5 mi) away. Luca was Marco's uncle and their purpose for moving (with their families) to the area at the base of Monte Raut was likely to make charcoal. They eventually built one large house with stone walls for their families and this house led to the naming of the village of Casasola, which means one house.

No other houses were built for over 50 years and the first small church, in honour of St. Oswald, was built in 1580. By this date, the different Rosa families were being distinguished with surnames stemming from their location in the village or other characteristics. For example, the Rosa-Tezza came from a family of weavers (tezza). The Rosa-Bernardins named all their first born Bernardo. The Rosa-Del-Vecchio had an exceptionally old grandfather.

There are numerous stories about happenings in the Val Colvera that are the same or similar to many other villages and regions. One interesting example is the Inquisition trials in 1648–50 claiming the existence of witches from the village of Poffabro who would perform their rituals in the "Plan di Malgustat" behind the peak of Monte Raut. Three local women were actually tried and sent to jail in Venice but fortunately were later found to be innocent.

The current Church of San Oswaldo was begun in 1650 and expanded in 1730 and again a century later. The Campanile was started in 1772 and completed in 1779. By the 18th century most of the able men would travel to the Istria region to work as lumberjacks, attesting to the lack of paid work close to home and insufficient local resources to provide for the growing population.

Casasola, while a small mountain village of little consequence,(except for its inhabitants) was affected by the flow of history as with all other villages and towns in Friuli. The French Revolution and Napoleon led to the end of the Venetian rule in the area and to battles in the region with the Habsburg Empire. The campaign for Italian unification during the 1850s and 1860s as well as the events of World War II divided families on both sides of the conflict but they eventually continued to live together once the main events were over. Much of the Italian campaign during World War I was fought in Friuli and the Austrian and German forces overran the region in 1917.

The village changed dramatically after earthquakes devastated the Friuli region in May 1976. Many of the older homes were demolished and the remaining homes were modernized. The dwindling population also led to the closing of the school in the 1960s with the children being first sent to the school in Frisanco and then all the children from the Comune being sent to school in Maniago. Another landmark, the "bottega", (bar and small grocery store) was closed with the passing of Sante Rosa-del-Vecchio(b. 1926) in 2006.

It has always been a village of emigrants with many former "Cjasasolins" living in the US, Canada, South America, France, Switzerland etc.

The Campanile, completed in 1779

The "laip" or fountain at one time the only source of water.

Frisanco with Casasola and part of Monte Raut in the background

Paredach, the summit of Monte Raut seen from the Piazza of Casasola
