= Stefano Balassone =

Italian television producer and writer

Stefano Balassone (born in 1943 in Sequals, Province of Pordenone) is an Italian television producer and writer.

== Biography ==
His work as a RAI board member from 1998 to 2002, and previously as deputy director of Rai 3 alongside Angelo Guglielmi (with whom he published numerous essays), counts him among the figures who devised a new model of television in Italy.

In fact, in the years from 1987 to 1994 Raitre became an innovative, cynical and courageous network; for the first time in Italy, “truth TV” was talked about and programs such as Milano, Italia, Quelli che il calcio, Avanzi, Samarcanda, Blob, Telefono giallo, Mi manda Lubrano, Chi l'ha visto? and Un giorno in pretura were aired for the first time, raising the share of Rai's third network from 2% to over 10%.

In 2000 he became a professor of “Media economics” at the Suor Orsola Benincasa University in Naples, where he still teaches, and at the Luiss University.
