= Finished Work Pentecostalism =

Pentecostal doctrine that locates sanctification at conversion

Finished Work Pentecostalism is a major branch of Pentecostalism that holds that after conversion, the converted Christian progressively grows in grace though the possibility of entire sanctification is rejected. On the other hand, the other branch of Pentecostalism—Holiness Pentecostalism, while teaching growth in grace that occurs after conversion, affirms the Wesleyan doctrine of entire sanctification as an instantaneous, definite second work of grace, which is a necessary prerequisite to receive the baptism in the Holy Spirit. Finished Work Pentecostals are generally known to have retained the doctrine of progressive sanctification from their earlier Reformed roots, while Holiness Pentecostals retained their doctrine of entire sanctification from their earlier Wesleyan roots (cf. Sanctification in Christianity#Methodism). William Howard Durham is considered to be the founder of Finished Work Pentecostalism.

The doctrine arose as one of the "new issues" in the early Pentecostal revivals in the United States. The term finished work arises from the aphorism "It's a finished work at Calvary", referring to both salvation and sanctification. Finished Work Pentecostals and Holiness Pentecostal are the two main branches of classical, trinitarian Pentecostalism. The dispute surrounding it was called the Finished Work Controversy which split the Pentecostal movement into Wesleyan and non-Wesleyan doctrinal orientations, known respectively as Holiness Pentecostals and Finished Work Pentecostals.

== History ==
=== Background ===
When Holiness Pentecostalism, the earliest form of Pentecostalism, emerged as a distinct movement within American Protestantism, it was through ministers with a Wesleyan-Holiness (Methodistic) background such as Charles Parham and William J. Seymour. John Wesley, the founder of Methodism, advocated Christian perfection that held that entire sanctification was indeed a definite work that was to follow conversion (the New Birth). Wesley drew on the idea of theosis to suggest that sanctification would cause a change in motivation that if nurtured would lead to a gradual perfecting of the believer. Thus while it was physically possible for a sanctified believer to sin, he or she would be empowered to choose to avoid sin. Wesley's teachings and Methodism gave birth to the holiness movement, which sought to propagate the Methodistic doctrine of entire sanctification (Christian perfection). Most advocates within the holiness movement, in accordance with Methodist theology, taught that sanctification had both instantaneous and progressive dimensions. They taught the availability of entire sanctification, which was a post-conversion experience. In this "second definite work of grace", the inclination to sin was removed and replaced by perfect love. The state of entire sanctification allowed the believer to turn his or her attention outward toward the advancement of the gospel. In contrast, the state of partial sanctification was said to turn the believer's attention to the interior spiritual struggle for holiness which in turn limited his or her usefulness to the church and society. Though the holiness movement arose primarily within Methodism, it made an impact on the Quaker tradition, as well as in certain Anabaptist, Presbyterian, Baptist, and Restorationist denominations.

Another movement stressing the importance of sanctification arose called the Higher Life movement, which centered around the Keswick Convention; the theology of the Higher Life movement is thus known as Keswickian theology. Keswickian theology differs from Wesleyan-Arminian (Methodist) theology. In time, significant Irvingite and Calvinist leaders became thoroughly embedded in the Higher Life movement. These included Charles Finney, William Boardman and Dwight L. Moody. These evangelicals of the Reformed tradition differed from their Wesleyan counterparts in that they rejected the holiness concept of a "second blessing" instead focusing on an "overcoming" life. Keswickian theology is most notable in the Christian and Missionary Alliance denomination.

Though distinct from Keswickian (Higher Life) theology, the Finished Work Pentecostal doctrine was also propagated through ministers of a Reformed background, including Pentecostal clerics William Howard Durham. The Finished Work doctrine became popular among those accepting a belief in the Baptism of the Holy Spirit who came from Reformed backgrounds; these adherents are known as Finished Work Pentecostals. While accepting a belief in a Baptism of the Holy Spirit accompanied with glossolalia, Finished Work Pentecostals reject the teaching of entire sanctification (the second work of grace in Methodism).

=== Articulation and opposition ===
In 1910, William Howard Durham preached a sermon entitled "The Finished Work of Calvary" at a midwestern Pentecostal convention. His finished work teaching "sought to 'nullify' the understanding of sanctification as wholly realized in the believer by a crisis experience subsequent to and distinct from conversion." This teaching began the controversy that divided the Pentecostal movement into a three-stage (Holiness Pentecostalism), which was the original Pentecostal view, and Durham's two-stage Pentecostalism (Finished Work Pentecostalism). Three-stage Pentecostalism (Holiness Pentecostalism) held the view that there are three distinct experiences of grace—conversion, sanctification, and baptism in the Holy Spirit; the third stage was added to the two traditional Wesleyan Methodist works of grace: conversion (New Birth) and entire sanctification (Christian perfection). In contrast, two-stage Pentecostalism (Finished Work Pentecostalism), which was the non-Wesleyan view held by Durham, held that sanctification was a lifelong process that began at conversion, thus this view only professed two stages—conversion and Spirit baptism.

Durham wrote in his magazine, The Pentecostal Testimony:

I ... deny that God does not deal with the nature of sin at conversion. I deny that a man who is converted or born again is outwardly washed and cleansed but that his heart is left unclean with enmity against God in it... This would not be Salvation. Salvation ... means a change of nature... It means that all the old man or old nature, which was sinful and depraved and which was the very thing in us that was condemned, is crucified with Christ.

Converts began to share their beliefs in meetings and councils in the western United States where the Azusa Movement and its emphasis on sanctification as a definite experience was seen as orthodoxy, and any deviation was viewed with suspicion. This took the form of family members and friends who frequented various revival and camp meetings in the eastern US returning home to the Northwest and attempting to share their understanding of the "new doctrine". The popularist version suggested that sanctification was not a requirement for Spirit Baptism. This was viewed as a dangerous and fallacious polemic by the majority who assumed that anyone who had received the Pentecostal Blessing had in fact been sanctified and as an outright heresy by those who had slipped into the entire sanctification camp. In either case, proponents of the finished work were seen as contentious and were in many cases officially shunned to the point of dividing families.

The dispute grew more heated in February 1911 when Durham went to Los Angeles where he was prohibited from preaching at the Upper Room and Azusa Street Missions. He was able to hold services at the Kohler Street Mission where he attracted 1000 people on Sundays and around 400 on weekdays. Durham died that same year, but the controversy surrounding finished work persisted.

=== Outcome ===
The effect of the controversy was that the young Pentecostal movement was split between Wesleyan-holiness and non-Wesleyan Reformed evangelicals. The finished work gained the greatest support from the independent and unorganized urban churches and missions. The Pentecostal denominations centered in the American South were the most resistant to the new doctrine. Today, these Holiness Pentecostal denominations (Apostolic Faith Church, (Note: The Apostolic Faith Church is one of the original denomination of Holiness Pentecostalism that emerged from the Azusa Street Revival.) Calvary Holiness Association, Church of God (Cleveland), Church of God in Christ, Congregational Holiness Church, Free Gospel Church, Pentecostal Holiness Church, and The (Original) Church of God) and their seminaries (such as the Heritage Bible College) retain a belief in the doctrine of entire sanctification—the second work of grace.

Despite the resistance of Wesleyan Pentecostals, however, finished work adherents were successful in persuading many Pentecostals of the validity of their view. As a result, most of the Pentecostal denominations founded after 1911 adhered to the finished work doctrine. This can be seen in Finished Work Pentecostal denominations such as the Assemblies of God, the International Church of the Foursquare Gospel, the Open Bible Churches, Elim Fellowship, and the Pentecostal Church of God.

== Denominations ==
- Apostolic Church
- Apostolic Church of Pentecost
- Assemblies of God
- Assemblies of God in Brazil
- Association of Evangelical Gospel Assemblies
- Australian Christian Churches
- Canadian Assemblies of God
- Christian Congregation
- CMI Global
- CRC Churches International
- Elim Fellowship
- Elim Pentecostal Church
- Faith Christian Fellowship International
- Fellowship of Christian Assemblies
- Independent Assemblies of God, International
- International Church of the Foursquare Gospel
- International Fellowship of Christian Assemblies
- Open Bible Churches
- Pentecostal Church of God
- The Fellowship
- Pentecostal Assemblies of Canada
- Pentecostal Assemblies of Newfoundland and Labrador
- Pentecostal Church of New Zealand

== See also ==
- Bapticostalism
- Keswickianism
