= William Howard Durham =

American Pentecostal preacher and theologian (1873–1912)

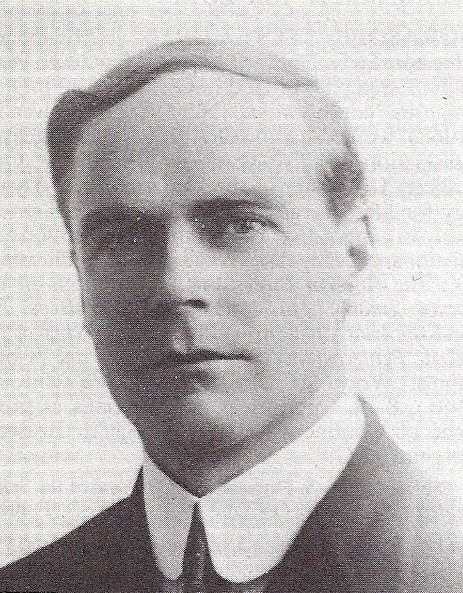
William Howard Durham

William Howard Durham (June 10, 1873 in Brodhead, Kentucky – July 7, 1912 in Los Angeles, California) was an early Pentecostal preacher and theologian, best known for advocating the Finished Work doctrine.

== Early life and career ==
Durham was born in 1873 in rural Kentucky and joined his family's Baptist church; however, he would only experience conversion later. He joined the Holiness movement and by 1901 founded the North Avenue Full Gospel Mission, a store-front church in Chicago.

When the influence of the Los Angeles Azusa Street Revival spread to Chicago, one member of his congregation was baptized in the Holy Spirit. Initially, Durham was dubious about the new Pentecostal movement, but when he visited the Azusa Street Mission for himself, he had his own experience of Spirit baptism with speaking in tongues and was convinced. Upon returning to Chicago, Durham transformed his North Avenue Mission into a center to disseminate the Pentecostal revival in the Midwest and among ethnic minorities. Durham started publishing a periodical, The Pentecostal Testimony, and travelled extensively to diffuse the Pentecostal message.

Raised in a Reformed tradition, Durham found difficult to accept the then-widespread Wesleyan doctrine of a three-stage salvation process held by most Pentecostals. Quickly Durham acquired supporters among Pentecostals of Reformed, Baptist, and Christian & Missionary Alliance backgrounds, and many missionaries abroad, but entered at odds with the older Pentecostal preachers, such as William Seymour, Charles Parham, and Florence L. Crawford.

Durham planned to systemize this theology and published drafts of it in his periodical, but he would not complete it as he died of pneumonia in Los Angeles in 1912.

== Legacy ==
Durham was a mentor to a whole generation of Pentecostal leaders: Louis Francescon, who preached among Italians in North America, Argentina, Brazil, and Italy; F.A. Sandgren, a pioneer among Scandinavians in the Midwest, one of them Daniel Berg, a Swedish Pentecostal missionary in Brazil; A.D. Urshan, a leader in the Persian, Assyrian, and Oneness Pentecostalisms; Andrew H. Argue, pastor in Canada; Eudorus N. Bell, a leader in the Assemblies of God; Aimee Semple McPherson, evangelist and church founder; John C. Sinclair, pastor in Chicago and church founder; and Frank Ewart, and Howard A. Goss, leaders in the Oneness Pentecostalism.

Although he was a staunch congregationalist and against denominationalism, there are many denominations that trace their roots from Durham's work: General Council of the Assemblies of God in the United States of America; International Church of the Foursquare Gospel; Open Bible Standard Churches; New Testament Christian Churches of America, Inc.; the Scandinavian-American Fellowship of Christian Assemblies and the Independent Assemblies of God, International; the Italian-American International Fellowship of Christian Assemblies and its counterparts abroad, like the Christian Congregation in Brazil; the Assembleias de Deus of Brazil; Pentecostal Church of God; the Pentecostal Assemblies of Canada; the Oneness United Pentecostal Church; and many independent Pentecostal congregations, mainly in the Northeast United States.
