= International Fellowship of Christian Assemblies =

North American Pentecostal Denomination

Coordinates: 41°19′7″N 80°24′44″W

- Classification: Protestant
- Theology: Pentecostal
- Governance: Cooperative body of congregations, organized into geographic districts with district overseers, and a collective annual convention and business meeting
- Associations: National Association of Evangelicals and Pentecostal/Charismatic Churches of North America
- Full communion: Assemblies of God in Italy; Canadian Assemblies of God; Christian Congregation
- Region: United States, affiliates worldwide
- Founder: Louis Francescon
- Origin: 1927 (with heritage dating to 1901); Niagara Falls, New York
- Congregations: Over 3,000 worldwide
- Members: Over 210,000 worldwide
- Official website: www.ifcaministry.org

The International Fellowship of Christian Assemblies (IFCA), formerly known as the Christian Church of North America (CCNA), is a North American Pentecostal denomination with roots in the Italian-American community, but is now a multicultural denomination. Central offices are located in Transfer, Pennsylvania. Ministries of the church include Benevolence, Home Missions, FOCUS, Foreign Missions, Education, Lay Ministries, and Public Relations. A convention is held annually, and their official publication is Vista, a quarterly magazine. Membership in 2000 was about 7,200 in 96 churches in the United States. They also have thousands of affiliated congregations internationally in Africa, Australia, Canada, Europe, South America, and Asia with a strong presence in India with over 100,000 members in over 1,000 churches. Brother Rick George is the general overseer of the denomination.

== History ==
The International Fellowship of Christian Assemblies is part of the larger Pentecostal movement that began in the United States during the first part of the 20th century and is rooted in a revival movement among the ethnic Italians in Chicago. Reverend Louis Francescon organized the first Italian-American Pentecostal church there in 1907 after hearing Pentecostal preacher William Howard Durham and having experienced the Baptism of the Holy Spirit. William Durham had prophesied that Francescon had been divinely appointed to bring the Pentecostal message to the Italian people. The IFCA remains committed to evangelism to people and communities with Italian roots, but is now a multicultural denomination and holds strongly to the mission of the Great Commission. Francescon, Pietro Ottolini, and several other early Italian-immigrant Pentecostals soon traveled to Brazil and Italy in order to evangelize to Italian communities outside of the United States. Reverend Francesco Emma (1875–1948) started the first church in New York City for Italian immigrants. News outlets at the time reported that his funeral lasted five days as seven thousand people visited from various parts of the world. The Rev. Joseph Giordano (1890-1955), continued with an Italian and later English ministry in Jersey City, New Jersey from 1927 through the 1950s. Following his passing, the Rev Biagio Parisi (1914-1992) continued the Jersey City ministry. The Rev. Joseph De Mola (1912–1987), who had come out of the Rev Joseph Giordano's ministry, continued with an Italian and English ministry in Staten Island during the 1950s and 1960s. The first convention of the Italian Pentecostal Movement was called in Niagara Falls, New York, in 1927, where the group adopted articles of faith and organized into a cooperative fellowship known as the Unorganized Italian Christian Churches of the United States. This helped build the movement into a cohesive whole. Later, the fellowship slightly modified its name to the Italian Christian Churches of North America. By the 1940s, "Italian" was dropped, in order to convey the message that its message was not just restricted to Italians. In 1948, the movement was incorporated in Pennsylvania as The Missionary Society of the Christian Church of North America. In 1963, the body was restructured as the General Council of the Christian Church of North America. In 2006, it adopted its current name.

== Beliefs ==
The IFCA is conservative and Pentecostal in their beliefs and practices. They stress order in their congregations when it comes to manifestations of the Holy Spirit among the congregants. Explaining their desire for order, the IFCA says that they "frankly abhor the excesses tolerated or practiced among the churches using the same name [of Pentecostalism]." The denomination's first General Council in 1927 had a mural which read, "Let all things be done decently and in order," a quotation from I Corinthians 14:40. The IFCA deems themselves a "Full Gospel Church", but this should not be confused with the four-fold Full Gospel concept found in some other Pentecostal denominations. They explain the Full Gospel as meaning that they "embrace every doctrine of the New Testament."

=== Articles of Faith ===
The beliefs of the IFCA are set forth in their 13-point "Articles of Faith" which was originally set forth in 1927, but its wording and focus has been modified over the years. These articles are deemed "binding upon all members" who are affiliated with the IFCA. Below is a summary of these articles:

1. The inerrancy and inspiration of the Bible and the use of the Historical-Grammatical Method in studying the scriptures.
2. A Trinitarian and Classical Theism understanding of God as "sovereign, holy, omnipotent, omniscient, omnipresent, immutable, immense, immanent, and transcendent."
3. The Divinity of Jesus as the Second Person of the Trinity and his sacrifice being the only salvation from sin. Also mentions the Virgin Birth, Miracles, and Resurrection of Jesus.
4. The existence of the "Demonic Realm" and the reality of Satan and his "demonic spirits" as being against the works and people of God. It adds that "Christ conquered them through Calvary."
5. The fall of mankind from perfection through Original Sin. That people cannot remedy their sinful state on their own and need salvation through Jesus in order to be saved.
6. That people receive a "new birth" through faith in Jesus and become "new creatures." Those who have faith in Jesus "have been justified, are being sanctified, and will ultimately be glorified."
7. Article on the meaning and purpose of the church. Belief in the "universal" church. Includes holding to two ordinances; The Lord's Supper and Water Baptism by full immersion.
8. The Pentecostal belief in Spirit Baptism available to all believers "with tongues as the initial physical evidence of having received the gift."
9. Enumeration of the Gifts of the Spirit and that the "purpose of the gifts is for the exhortation, edification and comfort of the Church."
10. That Divine healing may occur through prayer (individual or communal), direct divine intervention, or by the "spiritual gifts of healing."
11. The Premillennial second coming of Jesus.
12. The future resurrection when all saved individuals will go to Heaven for eternity and all unbelievers "will be judged before the Great White Throne" and sent to hell for eternity in a "conscious punishment."
13. A list of "Beliefs concerning lifestyle requirements in obedience to God's Word" including Holy Living, Marriage, Sanctity of Human Life, Missions (Evangelism), Financial Stewardship (Tithing), and the "Authority of Statement of Faith" as a proper interpretation of the Bible but as subservient to it.

=== Holiness Emphasis ===
Despite the IFCA descending from Finished Work Pentecostalism of William Durham instead of Wesleyan Holiness, they put an emphasis on Biblical Holiness. The IFCA believes "in the necessity of living a consistent life marked by obedience of God's Word, holiness, and evidencing godly spiritual fruit" and they give specific definitions for what they see as Biblical Marriage and Sexuality, speaking out against homosexuality, transgenderism, and gay marriage. Sister denominations such as the Christian Congregation in Brazil also focus on outward Holiness in dress and lack of beards, but the IFCA generally lacks this focus, instead detailing the avoidance of "sinful pleasures, practices and associations." In earlier editions of their Articles of Faith, it contained a rare statement which is a belief to "abstain from things offered to idols, from blood, and from things strangled," citing the Council of Jerusalem in Acts 15. It remains on some websites affiliated with the IFCA. This statement dates to early debates in the denomination's history where different leaders discussed whether or not the Council of Jerusalem regulations were currently binding to Christians. The Christian Congregation Movement and Assemblies of God in Italy, also founded by Louis Francescon and Italian-ancestry Pentecostals, likewise contain articles of faith related to the Jerusalem Council.

== Organization ==
The IFCA is a Cooperative Fellowship of member congregations and ministries unified under their Articles of Faith and mutual cooperation. As a whole the IFCA operates under a presbyterian polity with an executive board composed of 13 offices and a general overseer. On the local level, churches hold a high level of autonomy (Congregationalist polity) and are "free to adopt administrative rules and regulations." In the United States, IFCA churches are assigned to geographical districts, each with a district overseer. As of 2000, there were approximately 7,200 congregants in 96 member churches. By 2020, despite growth overseas, the number of member churches in the United States had dropped to 69 congregations. Presently there are 7 districts:

- Northwestern District (Western Pennsylvania and Ohio)
- Great Lakes District (Michigan, Illinois and Indiana)
- New England District (Massachusetts, Maine, Vermont and New Hampshire)
- Eastern District (New Jersey, Connecticut, Southern New York and Eastern Pennsylvania)
- Niagara Mohawk District (Upstate New York)
- Southern District (South Carolina and Florida)
- West Coast District (California, though "minimal")

While the majority of district members are physical church congregations, district fellowship members also include ministries focused on overseas activities which are headquartered from the United States. These include ministries which operate orphanages, Bible schools, and hospitals in other countries. The IFCA also operates a Bible college and seminary in Richmond Heights, Ohio, which offers bachelor's and master's degrees in partnership with the SUM Bible College.

=== Affiliates ===
While based out of the United States, the IFCA is in fellowship/affiliation with ministries and groups internationally. This global structure includes churches, orphanages, Bible colleges, schools, and food programs. These fellowship members are geared towards a common goal, which includes the Great Commission of evangelism, and are united in certain doctrinal points. Below are some of the global statistics per region according to the IFCA's global missions department:

- Africa: 6,600 members in 122 churches
- South Asia: 185,100 members in 1,685 churches
- Australia & Southeast Asia: 2,500 members in 120 churches
- Europe: 10,455 members in 104 churches

While not in official fellowship, the IFCA has strong cooperative ties with other Pentecostal groups also founded by Louis Francescon such as the Assemblies of God in Italy and the Christian Congregation in Brazil.

== Associations ==
The IFCA holds to interdenominational ecumenism with Christian groups of "like precious faith". They are members of the National Association of Evangelicals and the Pentecostal/Charismatic Churches of North America.

== See also ==
- Assemblies of God in Italy - sister movement in Italy
- Canadian Assemblies of God - sister movement in Canada
- Christian Congregation in Brazil - sister movement in Brazil
- Fellowship of Christian Assemblies unrelated Pentecostal body
