= Canadian Assemblies of God =

The Canadian Assemblies of God (CAOG) (formerly the Italian Pentecostal Church of Canada or IPCC) is a Finished Work Pentecostal denomination in Canada. It is one of three Canadian branches of the Assemblies of God, the world's largest Pentecostal denomination. The group shares identical beliefs and close cooperation with the Pentecostal Assemblies of Canada. It is also associated with the Assemblies of God in Italy and the Christian Church of North America and is a member of the Pentecostal/Charismatic Churches of North America.

== History ==
=== Beginnings of the Italian Canadian Pentecostal Movement ===
The movement had its beginnings in a group of eight former members of the Presbyterian Church Italian Mission (Presbyterian Church in Canada) in Hamilton who went on to establish in 1912 the Independent Italian Christian Church.

In 1913, the former Presbyterians were invited to a Pentecostal evangelistic service by two Pentecostal Evangelists. They kept going to the Pentecostal service until all of them were baptized in the Holy Spirit along with speaking in tongues. The group of eight were later joined by other Italian Pentecostals from Chicago to help them organize their Church. It would eventually become the first Italian Pentecostal Church in Canada.

Three of the eight original Hamilton Pentecostals spread the Pentecostal message to the Italian Community of Toronto. The first Pentecostal worship service was conducted in a house belonging to Domenico Guglietti.

=== Italian Pentecostal Church of Canada ===
The Toronto community was incorporated as the Christian Assembly in 1921 and later as the Italian Pentecostal Church. Several Italian Pentecostal Churches were planted in Brantford, London, Montreal, North Bay, Ottawa, and St Catherine's. A conference was held in 1944 in Toronto to unite the various churches into a single denomination. After the convention, the united body was called the Italian Pentecostal Church of Canada. Nowadays, the Italian Pentecostal Church of Canada is known as the Canadian Assemblies of God.
