= The Fellowship (FGFCMI) =

Full Gospel Fellowship of Churches & Ministers International
- Classification: Finished Work Pentecostal
- Official website: thefellowshipnetwork.net

The Full Gospel Fellowship of Churches and Ministers, International (FGFCMI), also known simply as The Fellowship, is a fellowship of like-minded Finished Work Pentecostal churches and ministers.

The Fellowship was formed from the common thought of some 100 ministers in the Voice of Healing movement that began in 1948.

On September 18 and 19, 1962 Gordon Lindsay, who was a prominent voice in the movement at the time, held a convention at the Baker Hotel in Dallas for interested ministers. Plans were laid and the Full Gospel Fellowship of Churches & Ministers International was born. Temporary officers were elected to serve until the great National Convention in latter part of June 1963. John Mears President, J.C. Hibbard Vice-President, Gordon Lindsay Secretary-Treasurer, W. A. Raiford Executive Secretary. June 28, 1963, A. C. Valdez was elected president.

The implication of the terminology Full Gospel is that many mainline denominations leave out parts of the gospel - such as miracles, speaking in tongues, divine healing, while the Full Gospel maintains it in its entirety and for every aspect of the individual.

Though its full constitutional name is still the Full Gospel Fellowship of Churches & Ministers International, its shortened name for common use is The Fellowship. The Fellowship maintains offices in Irving, Texas. In 2006, there were 902 participating churches with 414,100 members.
