= Fanna =

Fanna Fana (Friulian)
- Comune
- Comune di Fanna
- Coat of arms

- Location within Italy Location within Friuli-Venezia Giulia
- Coordinates: 46°11′N 12°45′E
- Country: Italy
- Region: Friuli-Venezia Giulia
- Province: Pordenone (PN)

Government
  - Mayor: Demis Bottechia

Area
  - Total: 10.1 km^{2} (3.9 sq mi)
- Elevation: 274 m (899 ft)

Population (April 2009)
  - Total: 1,574
  - Density: 156/km^{2} (404/sq mi)
- Demonym: Fannesi
- Time zone: UTC+1 (CET)
  - Summer (DST): UTC+2 (CEST)
- Postal code: 33092
- Dialing code: 0427

Fanna (Standard Friulian: Fane; Western Friulian: Fana; German: Fuan) is a comune (municipality) in the Regional decentralization entity of Pordenone in the Italian region of Friuli-Venezia Giulia, located about 100 kilometres (62 mi) northwest of Trieste and about 25 kilometres (16 mi) northeast of Pordenone.

Fanna borders the following municipalities: Arba, Cavasso Nuovo, Frisanco, Maniago.
