= Cavasso Nuovo =

Cavasso Nuovo Cjavàs (Friulian)
- Comune
- Comune di Cavasso Nuovo
- Coat of arms

- Location within Italy Location within Friuli-Venezia Giulia
- Coordinates: 46°12′N 12°46′E
- Country: Italy
- Region: Friuli-Venezia Giulia
- Province: Pordenone (PN)

Government
  - Mayor: Emanuele Zanon

Area
  - Total: 10.5 km^{2} (4.1 sq mi)
- Elevation: 285 m (935 ft)

Population (April 2009)
  - Total: 1,654
  - Density: 158/km^{2} (408/sq mi)
- Demonym: Cavassini
- Time zone: UTC+1 (CET)
  - Summer (DST): UTC+2 (CEST)
- Postal code: 33090
- Dialing code: 0427

Cavasso Nuovo (Friulian: Cjavàs) is a comune (municipality) in the Regional decentralization entity of Pordenone in the Italian region of Friuli-Venezia Giulia, located about 100 kilometres (62 mi) northwest of Trieste and about 25 kilometres (16 mi) northeast of Pordenone.

Cavasso Nuovo borders the following municipalities: Arba, Fanna, Frisanco, Meduno, Sequals.

== People ==
- Louis Francescon
