= Polcenigo =

Polcenigo Al Borc (Friulian)
- Comune
- Comune di Polcenigo
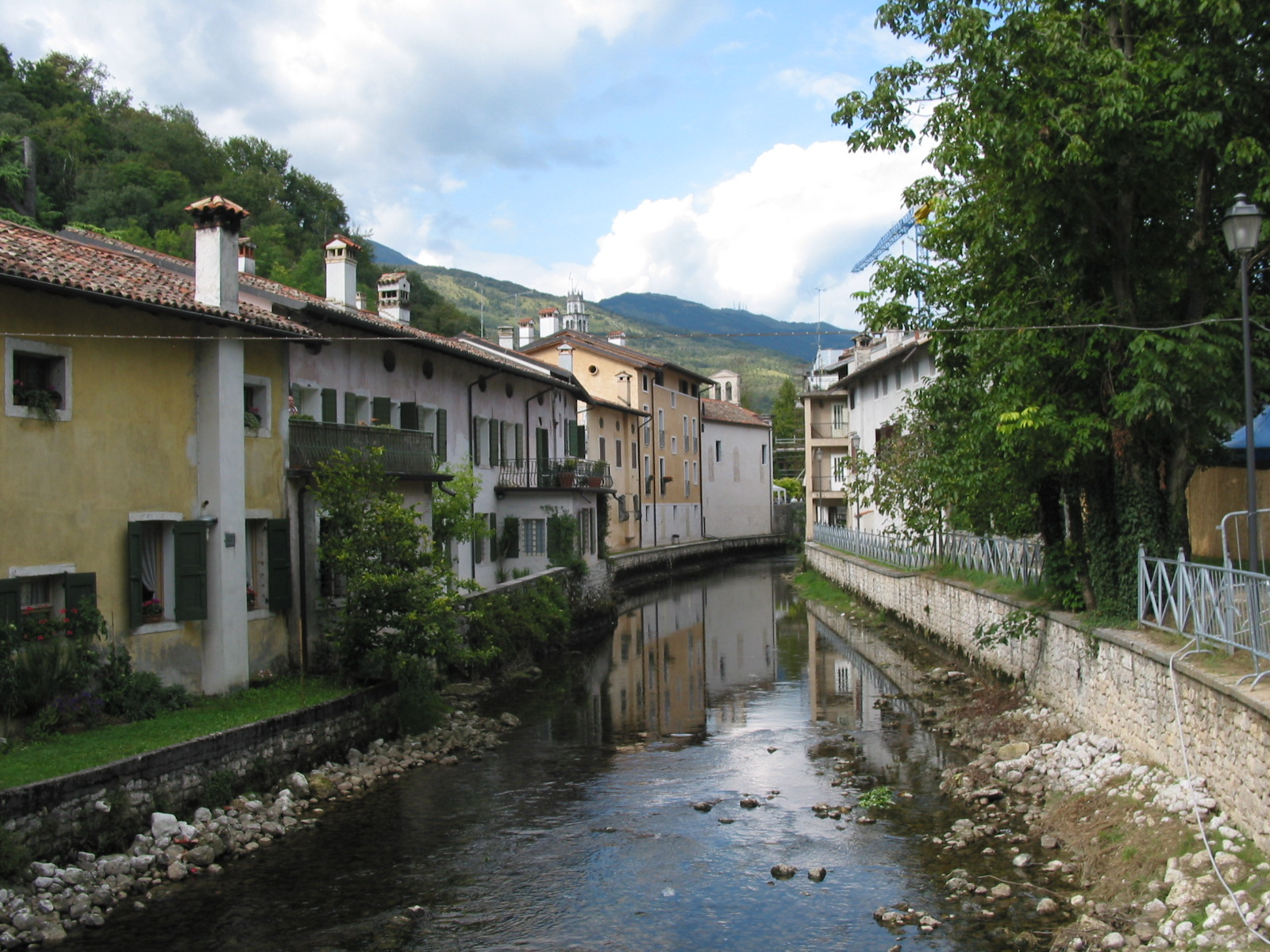

- Coat of arms

- Location within Italy Location within Friuli-Venezia Giulia
- Coordinates: 46°2′N 12°30′E
- Country: Italy
- Region: Friuli-Venezia Giulia
- Province: Pordenone (PN)
- Frazioni: Mezzomonte, San Giovanni, Range, Coltura, Gorgazzo

Government
  - Mayor: Mario Della Toffola

Area
  - Total: 49.2 km^{2} (19.0 sq mi)
- Elevation: 42 m (138 ft)

Population (Dec. 2004)
  - Total: 3,205
  - Density: 65.1/km^{2} (169/sq mi)
- Time zone: UTC+1 (CET)
  - Summer (DST): UTC+2 (CEST)
- Postal code: 33070
- Dialing code: 0434
- Website: Official website

Polcenigo (Friulian: Polcenic, locally Al Borc) is a comune (municipality) in the Regional decentralization entity of Pordenone in the Italian region Friuli-Venezia Giulia, located about 110 kilometres (68 miles) northwest of Trieste, 95 kilometres (59 mi) north of Venice and about 14 kilometres (9 mi) northwest of Pordenone.

Located on the slopes of the Western Carnic Prealps, it is characterized by numerous small streams, torrents, lake-like springs all flowing into river Livenza, whose waters springs in the place called Santissima.

Polcenigo borders the following municipalities: Budoia, Caneva, Fontanafredda, Tambre. It is one of I Borghi più belli d'Italia ("The most beautiful villages of Italy").

== History ==
Remains of prehistoric stilt houses, from the 4th millennium BCE, were found in the Palu' area, close to Livenza's springs, which is part of the Prehistoric pile dwellings around the Alps UNESCO World Heritage Site.

Afterwards, around the 1st millennium BCE, the Adriatic Veneti settled in the area, leaving bronze archaeological remains. In San Floriano hill, archaeologist have found an ancient Roman necropolis dating from the 5th or 4th century BC. Other sights include the castle and the Museum of Gastronomy Culture.

== Landmarks ==
=== Religious buildings ===
- Church of All Saints or Church of the Health.
- Church of San Rocco.
- Parish church of San Giacomo (the interior houses important artistic heritage: an altarpiece of Dall'Oglio, a wooden choir and an organ of Pescetti and frescoes featuring influences of Thomas of Modena).
- Church of San Floriano, on the hill of the same name.
- Shrine of the Holy Trinity. The church is built over an ancient place of pagan worship.(frazione of Coltura).

=== Secular buildings ===
- The castle of Polcenigo village, protected by the Regional Institute for Venetian Villas (IRVV), and built to a design by Matteo Lucchesi and commissioned by Ottavio Polcenigo in the middle of the eighteenth century on the remains of the former castle.
- The Palazzo Fullini-Zaia, eighteenth-century building with elegant rooms decorated in stucco. In 1809 hosted Eugène de Beauharnais.
- The picturesque old village of Polcenigo.

=== Archaeological site and natural area ===
- The archeological site Palù of Livenza - Santissima, Prehistoric pile dwellings around the Alps UNESCO World Heritage Site. There arises the river Livenza and the area is spectacular for water clarity (it is also called "liquid sky").
- The Park of San Floriano

=== Museums ===
- Museum of Art of Cooking.
