= Budoia =

Budoia Buduoia (Friulian)
- Comune
- Comune di Budoia
- Location within Italy Location within Friuli-Venezia Giulia
- Coordinates: 46°3′N 12°32′E
- Country: Italy
- Region: Friuli-Venezia Giulia
- Province: Pordenone (PN)
- Frazioni: Dardago and Santa Lucia

Government
  - Mayor: Roberto De Marchi (From 2009)

Area
  - Total: 37.7 km^{2} (14.6 sq mi)
- Elevation: 135 m (443 ft)

Population (Dec. 2004)
  - Total: 2,311
  - Density: 61.3/km^{2} (159/sq mi)
- Demonym: Budoiese
- Time zone: UTC+1 (CET)
  - Summer (DST): UTC+2 (CEST)
- Postal code: 33070
- Dialing code: 0434
- Patron saint: L'Assunta (Dardago), Sant'Andrea (Budoia), Santa Lucia (Santa Lucia)
- Saint day: 15 Agosto, 30 Novembre, 13 Dicembre

Budoia (Standard Friulian: Budoie; Western Friulian: Buduoia) is a comune (municipality) in the Regional decentralization entity of Pordenone at the foot of the Dolomites mountain range in the Italian region of Friuli-Venezia Giulia, located about 110 kilometres (68 mi) northwest of Trieste and about 13 kilometres (8 mi) northwest of Pordenone. As of 31 December 2004, it had a population of 2,311 and an area of 37.7 square kilometres (14.6 mi^{2}).

The municipality of Budoia comprises the frazioni (boroughs) of Dardago and Santa Lucia.

Budoia borders the following municipalities: Aviano, Fontanafredda, Polcenigo, Tambre.

== Demographic evolution ==
Historical population

Year	Pop.	±%
1861	?	—
1871	3,438	—
1881	3,269	−4.9%
1901	3,631	+11.1%
1911	4,320	+19.0%

Year	Pop.	±%
1921	4,374	+1.2%
1931	3,774	−13.7%
1936	2,776	−26.4%
1951	2,657	−4.3%
1961	2,622	−1.3%

Year	Pop.	±%
1971	2,095	−20.1%
1981	2,105	+0.5%
1991	2,024	−3.8%
2001	2,147	+6.1%

Source: Data from ISTAT
