= Fellowship of Christian Assemblies =

Pentecostal Christian association

The Fellowship of Christian Assemblies (FCA) is a Pentecostal Christian association with roots in a revival during the 1890s among the Scandinavian Baptist and Pietist communities in the United States.

In 1907 most of those congregations that experienced revival (many named Guds forsamling, 'Assembly of God' in Norwegian) learned about the Pentecostal movement through William Howard Durham Mission in Chicago. One of his assistant elders, F. A. Sandgren, published Folke-vennen, a periodical for Scandinavians, and consequently many Midwest churches joined the Pentecostal movement.

Scandinavian Pentecostalism was marked by a congregationalist church government, which led to isolation from the other Pentecostal groups in North America and the formation of loose networks, such the Fellowship of Christian Assemblies and the Independent Assemblies of God, International.

Though sharing some common background in the Pentecostal movement, the Fellowship of Christian Assemblies should be distinguished as a separate body from the Assemblies of God.

== See also ==
- Assemblies of God in Brazil
- International Fellowship of Christian Assemblies
