= San Quirino =

San Quirino San Quarìn (Friulian)
- Comune
- Comune di San Quirino
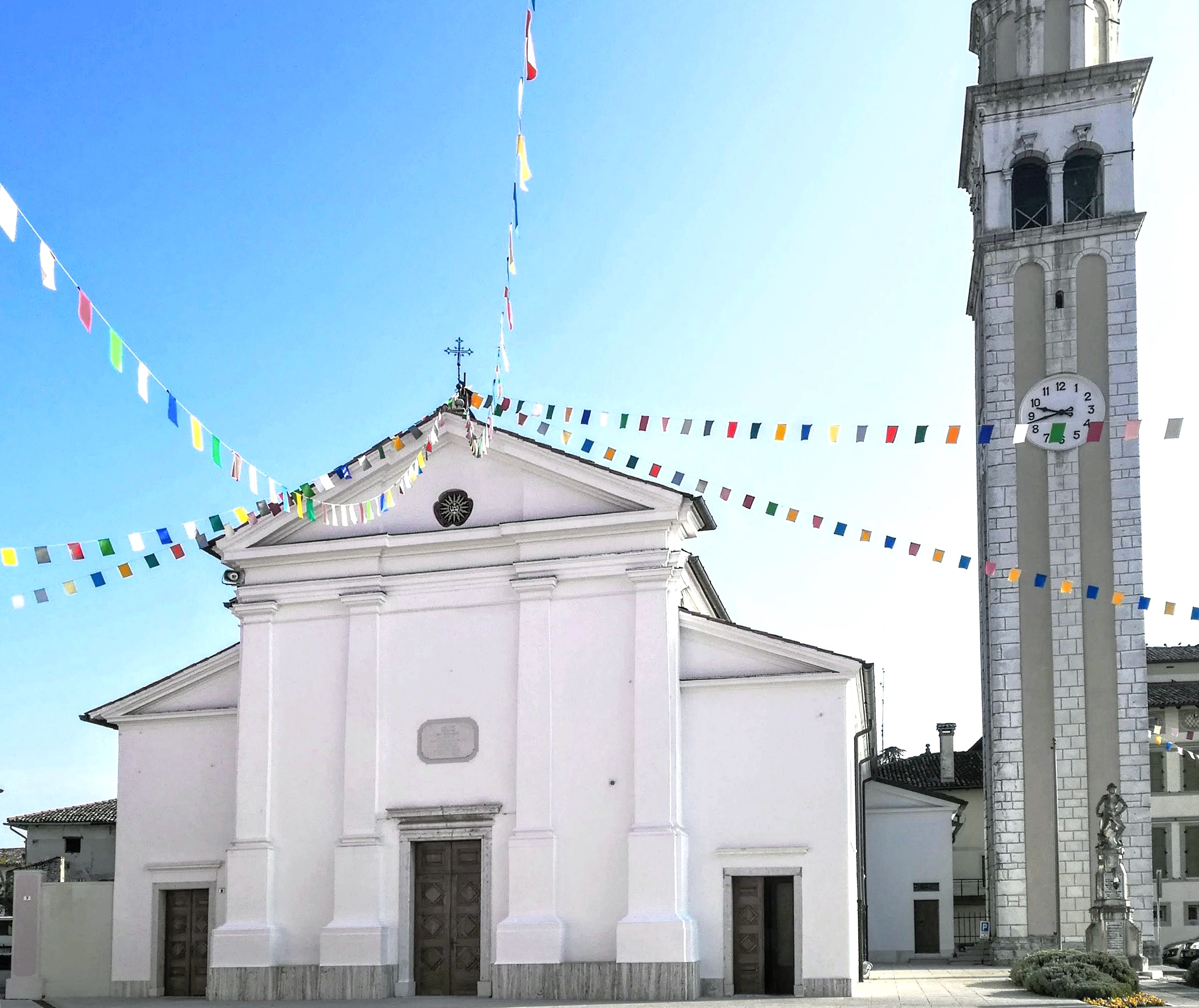

- Location within Italy Location within Friuli-Venezia Giulia
- Coordinates: 46°2′N 12°41′E
- Country: Italy
- Region: Friuli-Venezia Giulia
- Province: Pordenone (PN)
- Frazioni: Sedrano, San Foca

Government
  - Mayor: Gianni Giugovaz

Area
  - Total: 51.2 km^{2} (19.8 sq mi)
- Elevation: 116 m (381 ft)

Population (31 December 2015)
  - Total: 4,383
  - Density: 85.6/km^{2} (222/sq mi)
- Demonym: Sanquirinesi
- Time zone: UTC+1 (CET)
  - Summer (DST): UTC+2 (CEST)
- Postal code: 33080
- Dialing code: 0434
- Website: Official website

San Quirino (Friulian: San Quarìn) is a comune (municipality) in the Regional decentralization entity of Pordenone in the Italian region of Friuli-Venezia Giulia, located about 100 kilometres (62 mi) northwest of Trieste and about 8 kilometres (5 mi) northeast of Pordenone.

San Quirino borders the following municipalities: Aviano, Cordenons, Maniago, Montereale Valcellina, Pordenone, Roveredo in Piano, Vivaro.
