= Meduno =

Meduno Midun (Friulian)
- Comune
- Comune di Meduno
- Location within Italy Location within Friuli-Venezia Giulia
- Coordinates: 46°13′N 12°48′E
- Country: Italy
- Region: Friuli-Venezia Giulia
- Province: Pordenone (PN)
- Frazioni: Navarons

Area
  - Total: 31.2 km^{2} (12.0 sq mi)
- Elevation: 313 m (1,027 ft)

Population (Dec. 2004)
  - Total: 1,737
  - Density: 55.7/km^{2} (144/sq mi)
- Time zone: UTC+1 (CET)
  - Summer (DST): UTC+2 (CEST)
- Postal code: 33093
- Dialing code: 0427

Meduno (Friulian: Midun) is a comune (municipality) in the Regional decentralization entity of Pordenone in the Italian region of Friuli-Venezia Giulia, located about 100 kilometres (62 mi) northwest of Trieste and about 30 kilometres (19 mi) northeast of Pordenone. As of 31 December 2004, it had a population of 1,737 and an area of 31.2 square kilometres (12.0 mi^{2}).

The municipality of Meduno contains the frazione (borough) of Navarons.

Meduno borders the following municipalities: Cavasso Nuovo, Frisanco, Sequals, Tramonti di Sopra, Tramonti di Sotto, Travesio.

The Italian-American sculptor Luigi Del Bianco, the chief carver of Mount Rushmore, spent his youth in Meduno.

== Demographic evolution ==
Historical population

Year	Pop.	±%
1861	?	—
1871	2,748	—
1881	2,465	−10.3%
1901	3,145	+27.6%
1911	3,458	+10.0%

Year	Pop.	±%
1921	3,357	−2.9%
1931	2,987	−11.0%
1936	2,671	−10.6%
1951	2,799	+4.8%
1961	2,150	−23.2%

Year	Pop.	±%
1971	1,787	−16.9%
1981	1,909	+6.8%
1991	1,770	−7.3%
2001	1,730	−2.3%

Source: Data from ISTAT
