= Sequals =

Sequals Secuals (Friulian)
- Comune
- Comune di Sequals
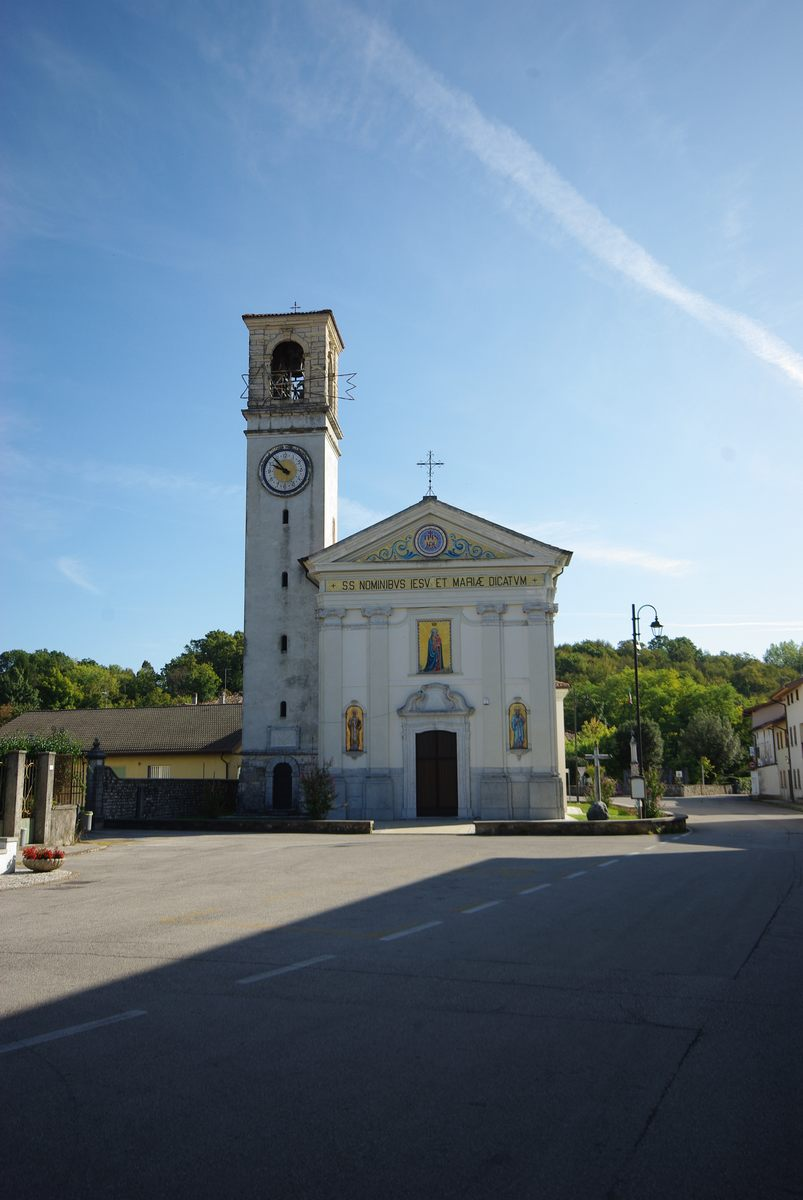
- Holy Names of Jesus and Mary's Church in Solimbergo

- Coat of arms

- Location within Italy Location within Friuli-Venezia Giulia
- Coordinates: 46°10′N 12°50′E
- Country: Italy
- Region: Friuli-Venezia Giulia
- Province: Pordenone (PN)
- Frazioni: Lestans, Solimbergo

Government
  - Mayor: Enrico Odorico

Area
  - Total: 27.70 km^{2} (10.70 sq mi)
- Elevation: 226 m (741 ft)

Population (1 January 2021)
  - Total: 2,182
  - Density: 78.77/km^{2} (204.0/sq mi)
- Demonym: Sequalsese(i)
- Time zone: UTC+1 (CET)
  - Summer (DST): UTC+2 (CEST)
- Postal code: 33090
- Dialing code: 0427
- Patron saint: Saint Andrew
- Saint day: 30 November
- Website: Official website

Sequals (Friulian: Secuals) is a comune (municipality) in the Regional decentralization entity of Pordenone, in the Italian region of Friuli-Venezia Giulia, located about 100 kilometres (62 mi) northwest of Trieste and about 25 kilometres (16 mi) northeast of Pordenone.

Sequals borders the following municipalities: Arba, Cavasso Nuovo, Meduno, Pinzano al Tagliamento, Spilimbergo, Travesio.

== People ==
- Stefano Balassone (born 1943), television producer and writer
- Primo Carnera (1906–1967), boxer
- Giandomenico Facchina (1826–1903), mosaïc artist
- Ciro Mora (1889 Sequals, Italy -–1960), mosaïc artist

== Twin towns and sister cities ==
- Ripa Teatina, Chieti, Italy
