= Travesio =

Travesio Travês (Friulian)
- Comune
- Comune di Travesio
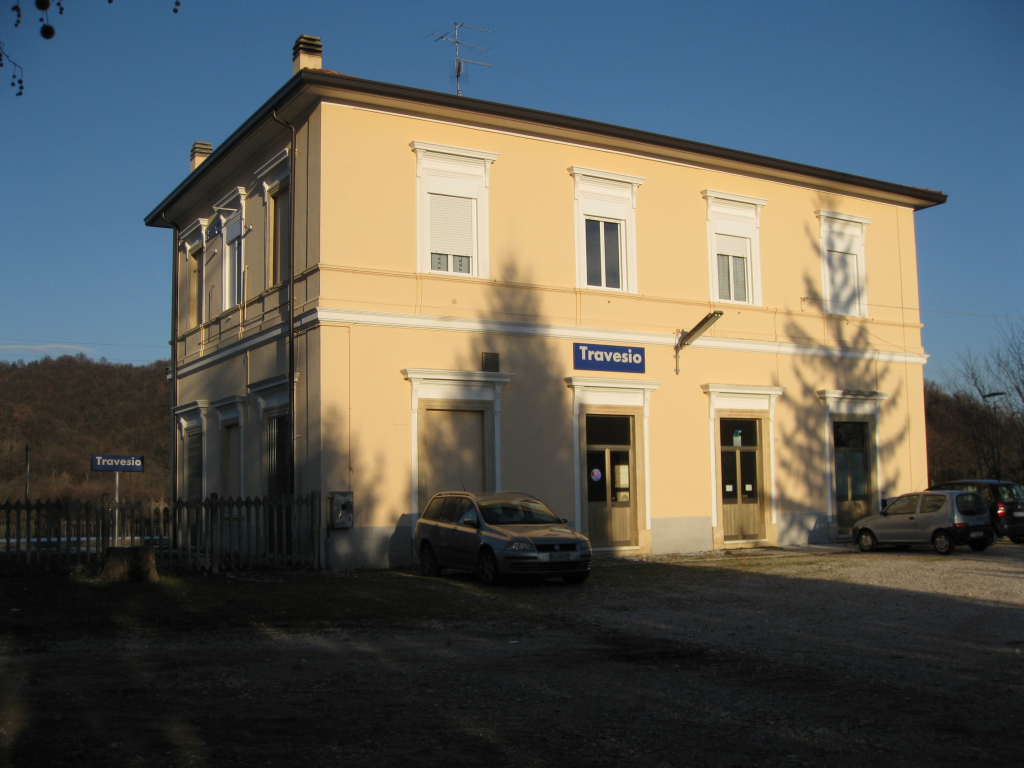
- Travesio railway station

- Location within Italy Location within Friuli-Venezia Giulia
- Coordinates: 46°12′N 12°52′E
- Country: Italy
- Region: Friuli-Venezia Giulia
- Province: Province of Pordenone (PN)

Area
  - Total: 28.8 km^{2} (11.1 sq mi)
- Elevation: 226 m (741 ft)

Population (Dec. 2004)
  - Total: 1,816
  - Density: 63.1/km^{2} (163/sq mi)
- Time zone: UTC+1 (CET)
  - Summer (DST): UTC+2 (CEST)
- Postal code: 33090
- Dialing code: 0427
- Website: Official website

Travesio (Friulian: Travês) is a comune (municipality) in the Regional decentralization entity of Pordenone, in the Italian region of Friuli-Venezia Giulia, located about 100 kilometres (62 mi) northwest of Trieste and about 30 kilometres (19 mi) northeast of Pordenone. As of 31 December 2004, it had a population of 1,816 and an area of 28.8 square kilometres (11.1 mi^{2}).

Travesio borders the following municipalities: Castelnovo del Friuli, Meduno, Pinzano al Tagliamento, Sequals, Tramonti di Sotto. Its frazione (borough) of Toppo is one of I Borghi più belli d'Italia ("The most beautiful villages of Italy").

== Demographic evolution ==
Historical population

Year	Pop.	±%
1861	?	—
1871	2,515	—
1881	2,479	−1.4%
1901	2,803	+13.1%
1911	3,733	+33.2%

Year	Pop.	±%
1921	3,522	−5.7%
1931	2,683	−23.8%
1936	2,329	−13.2%
1951	2,380	+2.2%
1961	1,942	−18.4%

Year	Pop.	±%
1971	1,906	−1.9%
1981	1,863	−2.3%
1991	1,823	−2.1%
2001	1,767	−3.1%

Source: Data from ISTAT
