= Arba, Friuli-Venezia Giulia =

Arba Darba (Friulian)
- Comune
- Comune di Arba
- Coat of arms

- Location within Italy Location within Friuli-Venezia Giulia
- Coordinates: 46°9′N 12°47′E
- Country: Italy
- Region: Friuli-Venezia Giulia
- Province: Pordenone (PN)
- Frazioni: Colle

Government
  - Mayor: Antonio Ferrarin

Area
  - Total: 15.31 km^{2} (5.91 sq mi)
- Elevation: 210 m (690 ft)

Population (30 April 2017)
  - Total: 1,283
  - Density: 83.80/km^{2} (217.0/sq mi)
- Demonym: Arbesi
- Time zone: UTC+1 (CET)
  - Summer (DST): UTC+2 (CEST)
- Postal code: 33090
- Dialing code: 0427
- Website: Official website

Arba (Standard Friulian: Darbe; Western Friulian: Darba) is a comune (municipality) in the Regional decentralization entity of Pordenone in the Italian region of Friuli-Venezia Giulia, located about 100 kilometres (62 mi) northwest of Trieste and about 25 kilometres (16 mi) northeast of Pordenone.

Arba borders the following municipalities: Cavasso Nuovo, Fanna, Maniago, Sequals, Spilimbergo, Vivaro.
