= Caneva =

- Comune
- Comune di Caneva
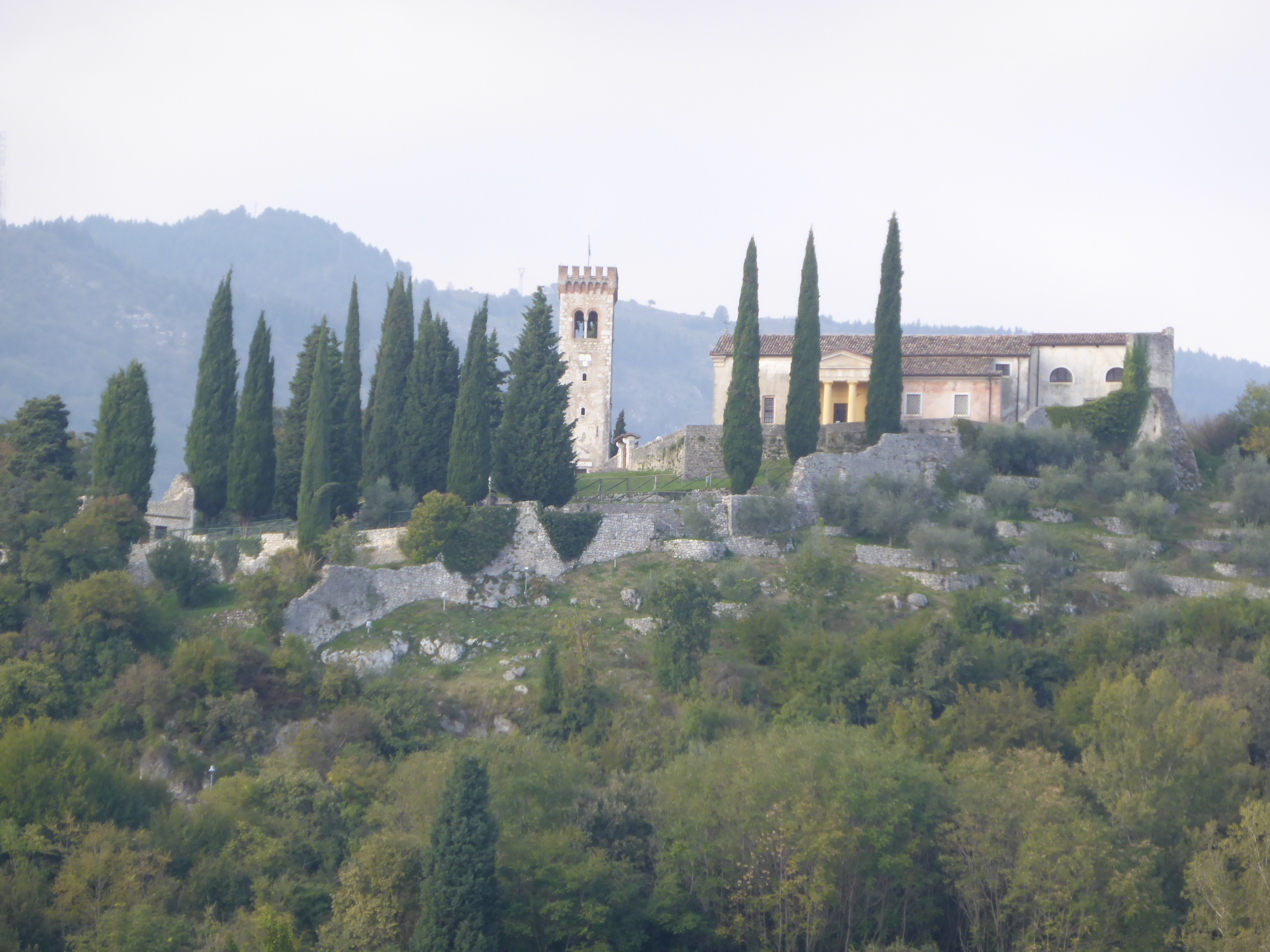

- Location within Italy Location within Friuli-Venezia Giulia
- Coordinates: 45°58′N 12°27′E
- Country: Italy
- Region: Friuli-Venezia Giulia
- Province: Pordenone (PN)

Area
  - Total: 42.0 km^{2} (16.2 sq mi)

Population (Dec. 2004)
  - Total: 6,374
  - Density: 152/km^{2} (393/sq mi)
- Time zone: UTC+1 (CET)
  - Summer (DST): UTC+2 (CEST)
- Postal code: 33070
- Dialing code: 0434
- Website: Official website

Caneva (Italian: [ˈkaːneva]; Venetian: Càneva; Standard Friulian: Cjànive, Western Friulian: Cjàneva) is a comune (municipality) in the Regional decentralization entity of Pordenone in the Italian region of Friuli-Venezia Giulia, located about 110 kilometres (68 mi) northwest of Trieste and about 15 kilometres (9 mi) west of Pordenone. As of 31 December 2004, it had a population of 6,374 and an area of 42.0 square kilometres (16.2 mi^{2}).

Caneva borders the following municipalities: Cordignano, Fontanafredda, Fregona, Polcenigo, Sacile, Sarmede, Tambre.

== Demographic evolution ==
Historical population

Year	Pop.	±%
1861	?	—
1871	5,151	—
1881	5,213	+1.2%
1901	5,821	+11.7%
1911	7,148	+22.8%

Year	Pop.	±%
1921	7,763	+8.6%
1931	7,219	−7.0%
1936	6,416	−11.1%
1951	7,172	+11.8%
1961	6,830	−4.8%

Year	Pop.	±%
1971	6,423	−6.0%
1981	6,443	+0.3%
1991	6,218	−3.5%
2001	6,323	+1.7%

Source: Data from ISTAT

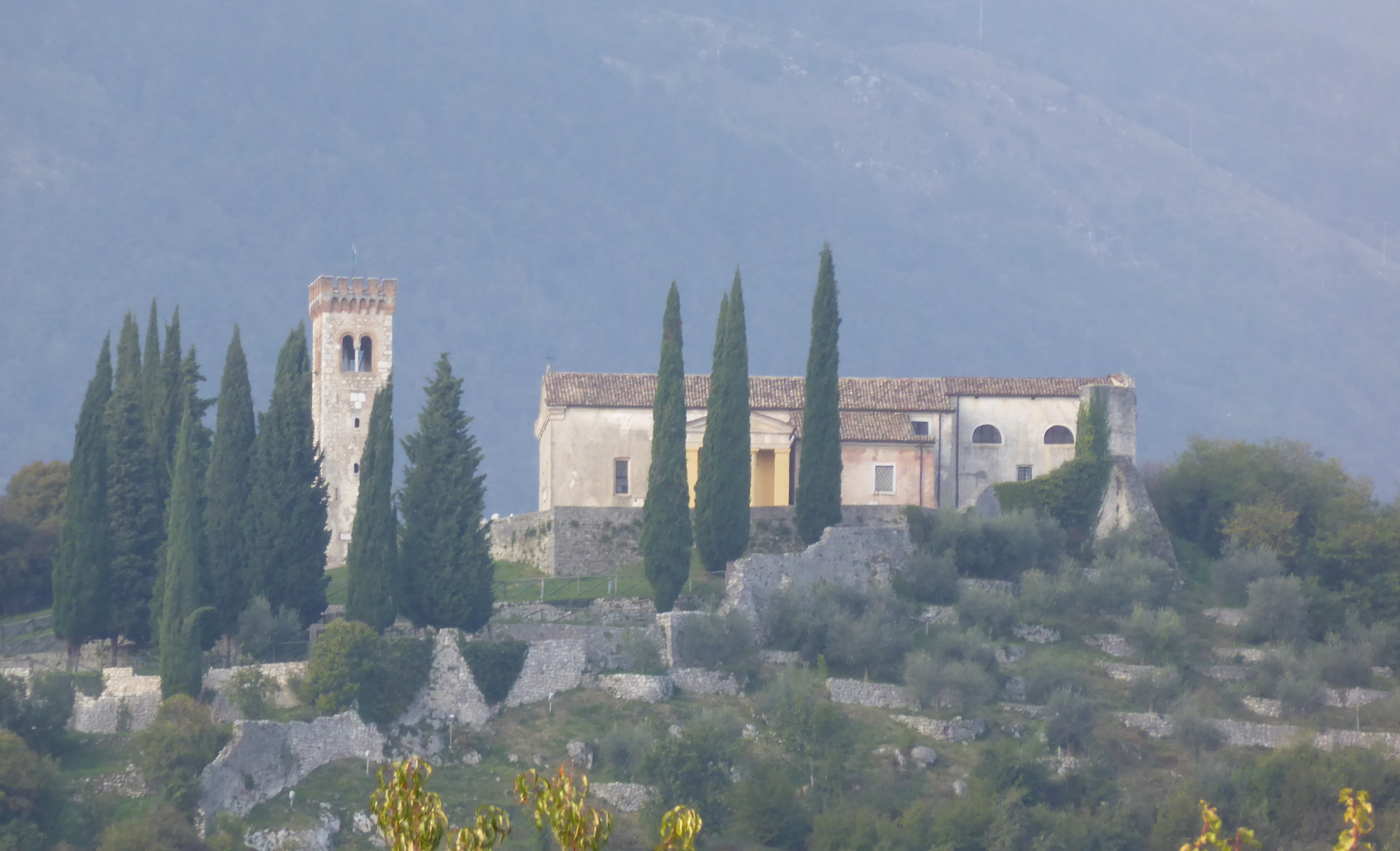
The Castello di Caneva

== Twin towns ==
Caneva is twinned with:

- Neumarkt-Sankt Veit, Germany, since 2002
