= Vivaro =

Vivaro Vivâr (Friulian)
- Comune
- Comune di Vivaro
- Location within Italy Location within Friuli-Venezia Giulia
- Coordinates: 46°5′N 12°47′E
- Country: Italy
- Region: Friuli-Venezia Giulia
- Province: Pordenone (PN)
- Frazioni: Basaldella, Tesis

Government
  - Mayor: Mauro Candido

Area
  - Total: 37.68 km^{2} (14.55 sq mi)
- Elevation: 138 m (453 ft)

Population (31 December 2015)
  - Total: 1,352
  - Density: 35.88/km^{2} (92.93/sq mi)
- Demonym: Vivarini
- Time zone: UTC+1 (CET)
  - Summer (DST): UTC+2 (CEST)
- Postal code: 33099
- Dialing code: 0427
- Website: Official website

Vivaro (Friulian: Vivâr) is a comune (municipality) in the Regional decentralization entity of Pordenone in the Italian region of Friuli-Venezia Giulia, located about 90 kilometres (56 mi) northwest of Trieste and about 15 kilometres (9 mi) northeast of Pordenone.

Vivaro borders the following municipalities: Arba, Cordenons, Maniago, San Giorgio della Richinvelda, San Quirino, and Spilimbergo.
