= Cimolais =

Cimolais Thimolei (Venetian)
- Comune
- Comune di Cimolais
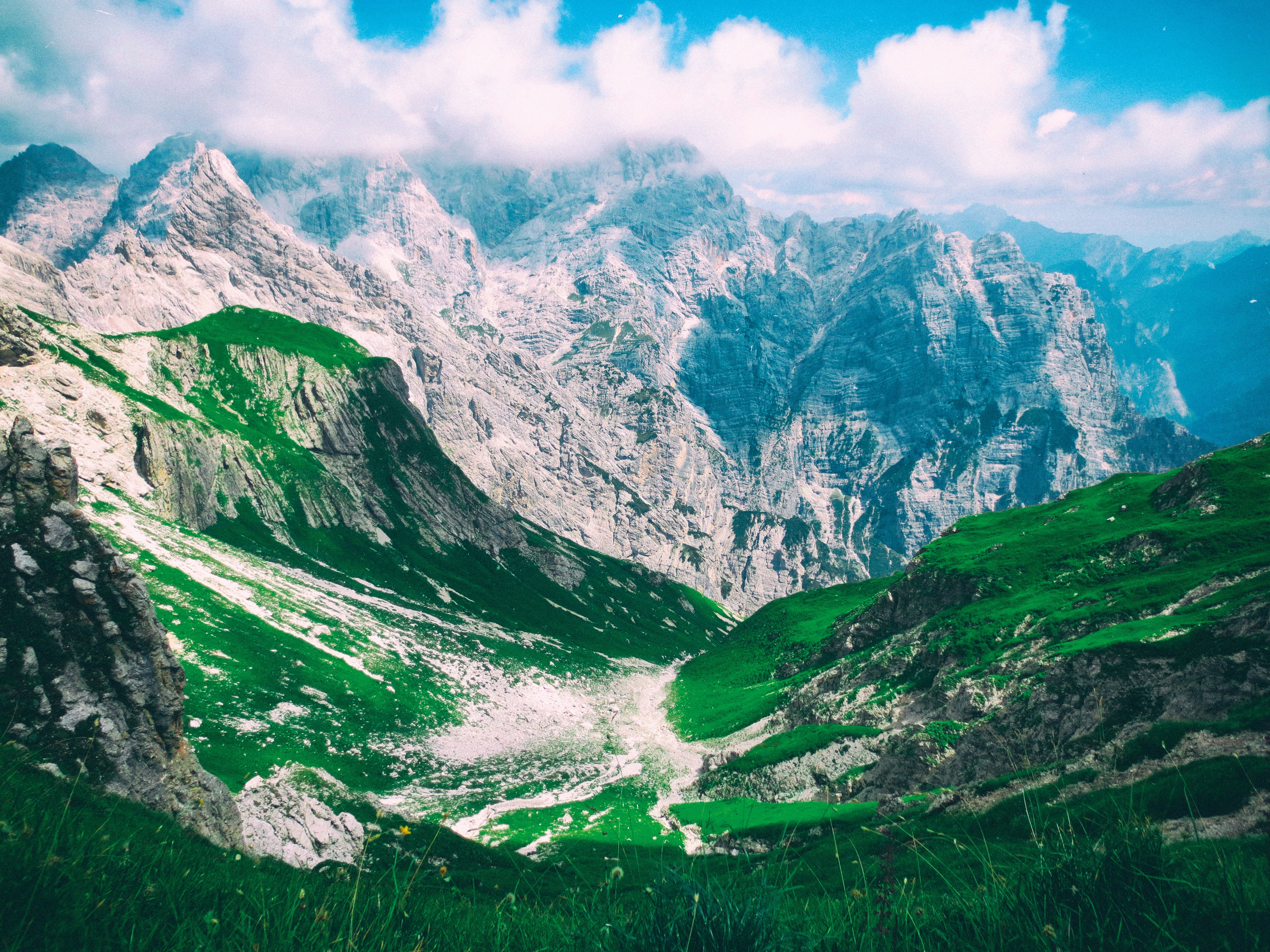

- Coat of arms

- Location within Italy Location within Friuli-Venezia Giulia
- Coordinates: 46°17′N 12°26′E
- Country: Italy
- Region: Friuli-Venezia Giulia
- Province: Pordenone (PN)
- Frazioni: San Floriano

Government
  - Mayor: Rita Bressa

Area
  - Total: 101.1 km^{2} (39.0 sq mi)
- Elevation: 652 m (2,139 ft)

Population (31 December 2008)
  - Total: 437
  - Density: 4.32/km^{2} (11.2/sq mi)
- Demonym: Cimoliani
- Time zone: UTC+1 (CET)
  - Summer (DST): UTC+2 (CEST)
- Postal code: 33080
- Dialing code: 0427
- Website: Official website

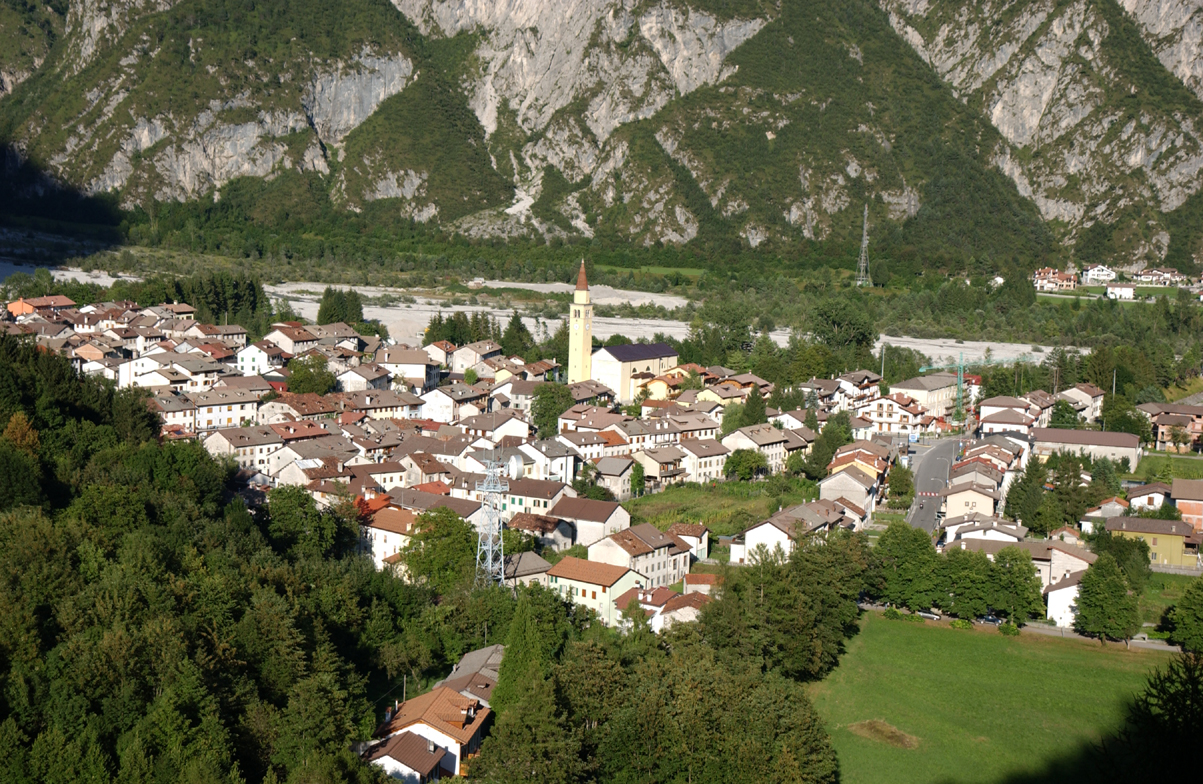
The town of Cimolais

Cimolais (local Venetian: Thimolei) is a comune (municipality) in the regional decentralization entity of Pordenone in the Italian region of Friuli-Venezia Giulia, located about 130 kilometres (81 mi) northwest of Trieste and about 40 kilometres (25 mi) northwest of Pordenone.
