= Assemblies of God in Italy =

The Assemblies of God in Italy (Italian: Assemblee di Dio in Italia, ADI), whose full name is Evangelical Christian Churches Assemblies of God in Italy (Chiese Cristiane Evangeliche Assemblee di Dio in Italia), is a fellowship of evangelical and Pentecostal churches which functions as the Italian branch of the International Fellowship of Christian Assemblies, while being in communion with the World Assemblies of God Fellowship as well.

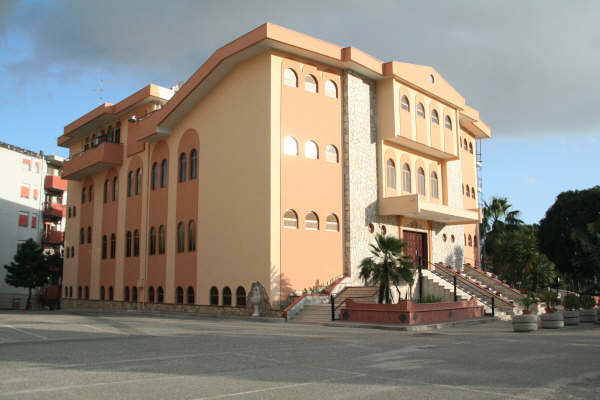
ADI church in Reggio Calabria

== History ==
The ADI traces its roots in the "Italian Pentecostal revival" led by Louis Francescon among Italian immigrants in Chicago in 1907, that led to the formation of the Christian Congregation. From Chicago, pioneers like Francescon, Giacomo Lombardi, Pietro Ottolini, Lucia Menna, Umberto Gazzari, and Louis Terragnoli went back to Italy in order to spread the Pentecostal gospel and establish Pentecostal churches.

During the Fascist regime, a letter issued by Guido Buffarini Guidi, undersecretary of the Interior, provided grounds to shut all Pentecostal congregations in Italy.

After the fall of Fascism, it was still difficult for Pentecostals to practice their faith and religious freedom, due to legal and social obstacles. Thus, several Pentecostal congregations sought a purely nominal affiliation with the Assemblies of God USA. The ADI was consequently founded in 1948.

In 1986 the denomination signed an agreement with the Italian government, in accordance with art. 8 of the Constitution of Italy; the agreement became law in 1988.

According to CESNUR, a think tank, the ADI is the single largest Protestant denomination in Italy. As of 2013, it counts 1,028 congregations, 150,000 members and 590 pastors. The church is more numerous in the South, especially Campania, Apulia, Basilicata, Calabria and Sicily, where it has more than half of its congregations.

== See also ==
- Religion in Italy
- Federation of Evangelical Churches in Italy
- Federation of Pentecostal Churches (Italy)
- List of Italian religious minority politicians
