= Barcis =

Barcis Barce (Friulian)
- Comune
- Comune di Barcis
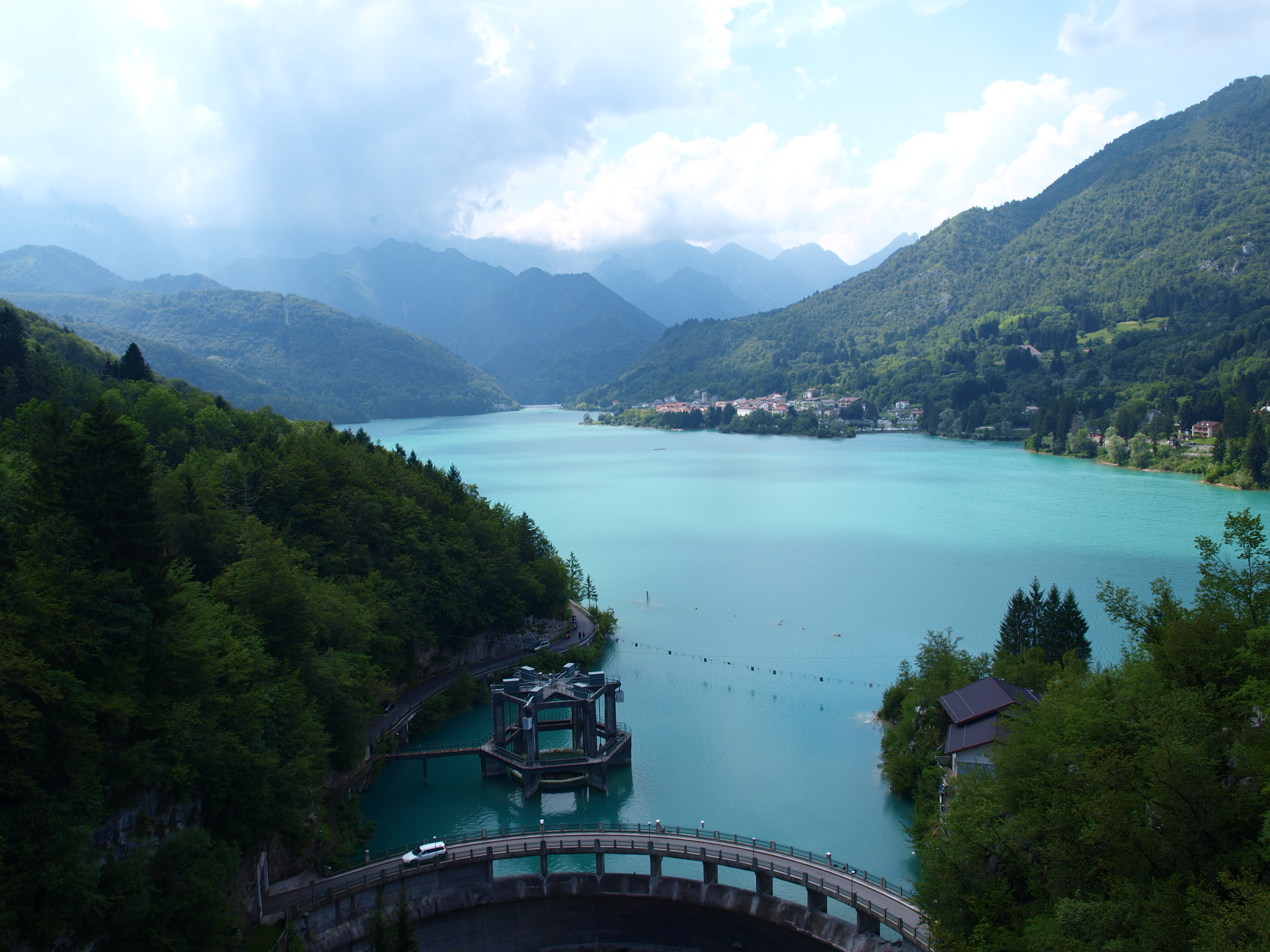
- Lake Barcis seen from the Skywalk on the Dint trail

- Coat of arms

- Location within Italy Location within Friuli-Venezia Giulia
- Coordinates: 46°11′N 12°34′E
- Country: Italy
- Region: Friuli-Venezia Giulia
- Province: Pordenone (PN)
- Frazioni: Arcola, Armasio, Cimacosta, Fontane, Guata, Losie, Mighet, Molassa, Pentina, Pezzeda, Ponte Antoi, Portuz, Predaia, Ribe, Roppe, Vallata

Government
  - Mayor: Claudio Traina

Area
  - Total: 103.41 km^{2} (39.93 sq mi)
- Elevation: 409 m (1,342 ft)

Population (31 December 2017)
  - Total: 256
  - Density: 2.48/km^{2} (6.41/sq mi)
- Demonym: Barciani
- Time zone: UTC+1 (CET)
  - Summer (DST): UTC+2 (CEST)
- Postal code: 33080
- Dialing code: 0425
- Website: Official website

Barcis (Western Friulian: Barce) is a comune (municipality) in the Regional decentralization entity of Pordenone in the Italian region of Friuli-Venezia Giulia, located in the Valcellina about 110 kilometres (68 mi) northwest of Trieste and about 25 kilometres (16 mi) north of Pordenone.

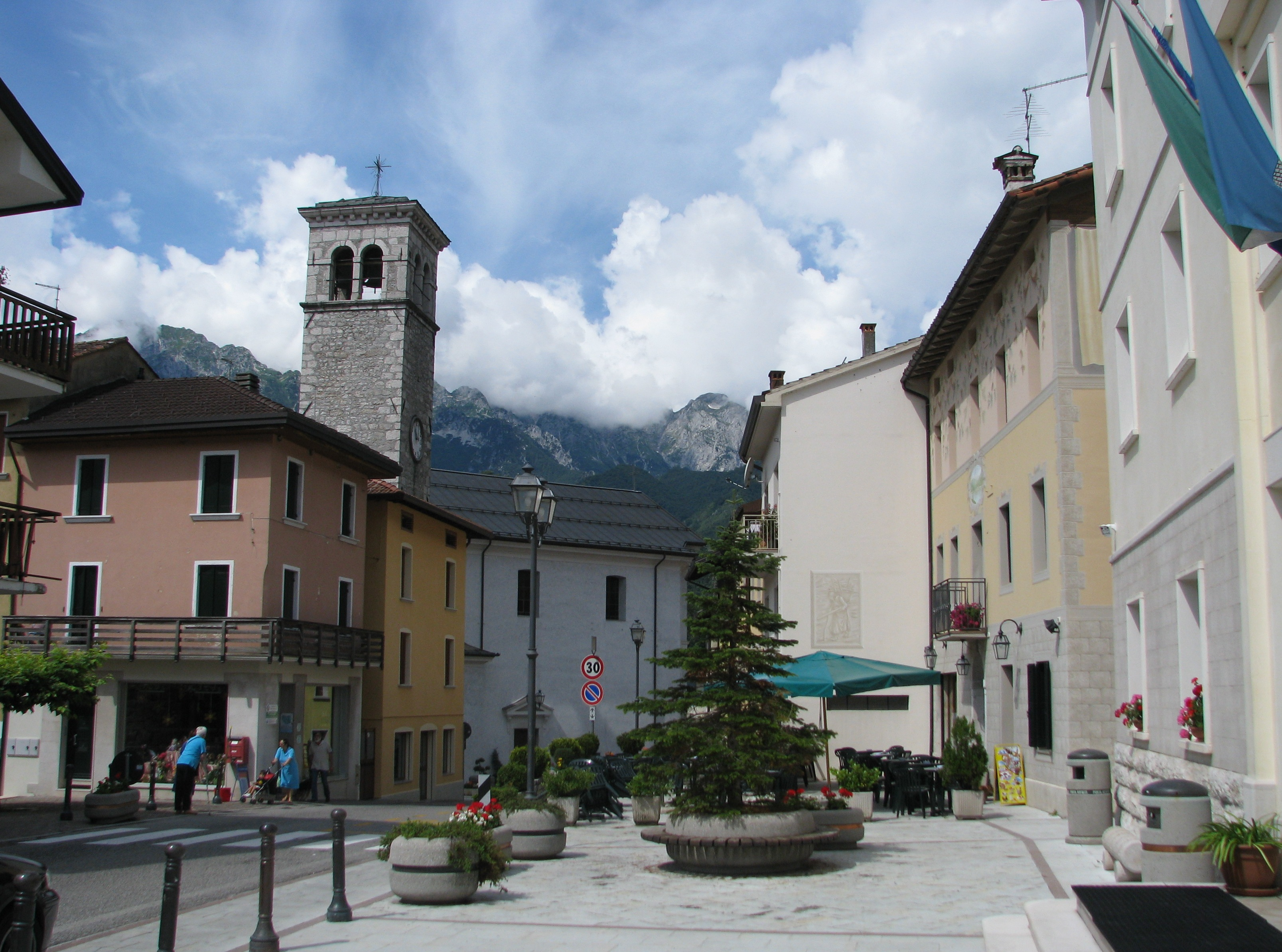
The town in spring
