= Province of Pordenone =

Province of Italy

Coordinates: 45°57′N 12°41′E

Province of Pordenone Provincia di Pordenone (Italian) Provincie di Pordenon (Friulian) Provincia de Pordenon (Venetian)
- Province
- Regional Decentralization Entity of Pordenone; Ente di decentramento regionale di Pordenone (Italian)
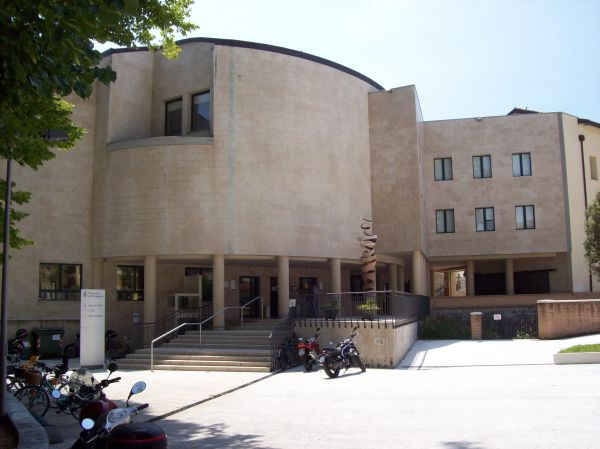
- Palazzo della Provincia, the provincial seat

- Flag Coat of arms

- Location of the province of Pordenone in Italy
- Country: Italy
- Region: Friuli-Venezia Giulia
- Capital(s): Pordenone
- Municipalities: 50

Government
  - General director: Cinzia Cuscela

Area
  - Total: 2,275.42 km^{2} (878.54 sq mi)

Population (2026)
  - Total: 311,114
  - Density: 136.728/km^{2} (354.124/sq mi)

GDP
  - Total: €9.217 billion (2015)
  - Per capita: €29,412 (2015)
- Time zone: UTC+1 (CET)
  - Summer (DST): UTC+2 (CEST)
- Postal code: 33070, 33072-33074, 33076-33077, 33079-33087, 33090-33099, 33170
- Telephone prefix: 0425, 0427, 0432, 0434, 0828
- ISO 3166 code: IT-PN
- Vehicle registration: PN
- ISTAT code: 093

The province of Pordenone (Italian: provincia di Pordenone; Friulian: provincie di Pordenon; Venetian: provincia de Pordenon) was a province in the autonomous region of Friuli-Venezia Giulia in Italy, subdivided from the province of Udine in 1968. Its capital was the city of Pordenone. The province was abolished on 30 September 2017; it was reestablished in 2019 as the regional decentralization entity of Pordenone (Italian: ente di decentramento regionale di Pordenone; Friulian: ent di decentrament regjonâl di Pordenon), and was reactivated on 1 July 2020.

It has a population of 311,114 in an area of 2,275.42 square kilometres (878.54 sq mi) across its 50 municipalities.

== History ==
Pordenone was settled before 2000 BCE and was situated along the boundary between Villanovan culture and Alpine Hallstatt culture. It was under the rule of Treviso during the Middle Ages, although it was sacked by Aquileian soldiers in 1233 CE. The Austrian House of Habsburg subsequently ruled the area between 1278 and 1508, although the land surrounding it was briefly entirely under the rule of Venice. In the 15th century it was an important centre for the production of paper, textiles, ceramics, silk, and wool, and attracted Tuscan merchants.

In 1508, Venice occupied the city in response to calls from pro-Venetian residents of Pordenone, but this occupation was not well received. It fell under the rule of Bartolomeo d'Alviano after this occupation until 1537, when Venice invaded the city. It was left under Venetian rule until the invasion of the area by Napoleon in 1797; the city was later controlled by Austria between 1813 and 1866. In 1866, it was conquered by the Kingdom of Italy. It was the third Italian city to use hydroelectric power, after Milan and Tivoli, in 1888. The city was occupied by Austrians during World War I, and it was bombed forty-three times in World War II.

== Geography ==
The province of Pordenone is the westernmost of the four provinces in the autonomous region of Friuli-Venezia Giulia in northeastern Italy. It is bounded to the east and north by the province of Udine. To the west lies the province of Belluno, to the southwest the province of Treviso and to the south, the province of Venice, all in the region of Veneto. The province is located in the lowlands of the Po-Venetian Valley, south of the Venetian Prealps and the Alpine foothills of Friuli. It is the only province in the autonomous region that does not border on the Adriatic Sea. The provincial capital is the city of Pordenone, an ancient port on the River Noncello.

Hilly country in the north of the province give way further south to the flat land of the lower Po Valley. Rivers cross the province from north to south carrying runoff from the melting snow in the Alps. Much of the water sinks underground and resurfaces on the plains as a zone of springs.

== Government ==
=== Municipalities ===
Map of all the municipalities in the province

- Andreis
- Arba
- Aviano
- Azzano Decimo
- Barcis
- Brugnera
- Budoia
- Caneva
- Casarsa della Delizia
- Castelnovo del Friuli
- Cavasso Nuovo
- Chions
- Cimolais
- Claut
- Clauzetto
- Cordenons
- Cordovado
- Erto e Casso
- Fanna
- Fiume Veneto
- Fontanafredda
- Frisanco
- Maniago
- Meduno
- Montereale Valcellina
- Morsano al Tagliamento
- Pasiano di Pordenone
- Pinzano al Tagliamento
- Polcenigo
- Porcia
- Pordenone
- Prata di Pordenone
- Pravisdomini
- Roveredo in Piano
- Sacile
- San Giorgio della Richinvelda
- San Martino al Tagliamento
- San Quirino
- San Vito al Tagliamento
- Sequals
- Sesto al Reghena
- Spilimbergo
- Tramonti di Sopra
- Tramonti di Sotto
- Travesio
- Vajont
- Valvasone Arzene
- Vito d'Asio
- Vivaro
- Zoppola

== Demographics ==
As of 2026, the population is 311,114, of which 49.5% are male, and 50.5% are female. Minors make up 14.6% of the population, and seniors make up 25.8%.

Historical population

Year	Pop.	±%
1861	-	—
1871	165,403	—
1881	172,896	+4.5%
1901	202,031	+16.9%
1911	247,899	+22.7%
1921	270,376	+9.1%
1931	254,501	−5.9%
1936	225,529	−11.4%

Year	Pop.	±%
1951	244,837	+8.6%
1961	235,550	−3.8%
1971	253,906	+7.8%
1981	275,888	+8.7%
1991	275,267	−0.2%
2001	286,198	+4.0%
2011	310,811	+8.6%
2021	309,473	−0.4%

Source: ISTAT

=== Immigration ===
As of 2025, immigrants make up 17.5% of the population. The 5 largest foreign countries of birth are Romania, Albania, India, Switzerland, and France.

== See also ==
- Lake dei Tramonti
