= Frisanco =

Frisanco Frisanc (Friulian)
- Comune
- Comune di Frisanco
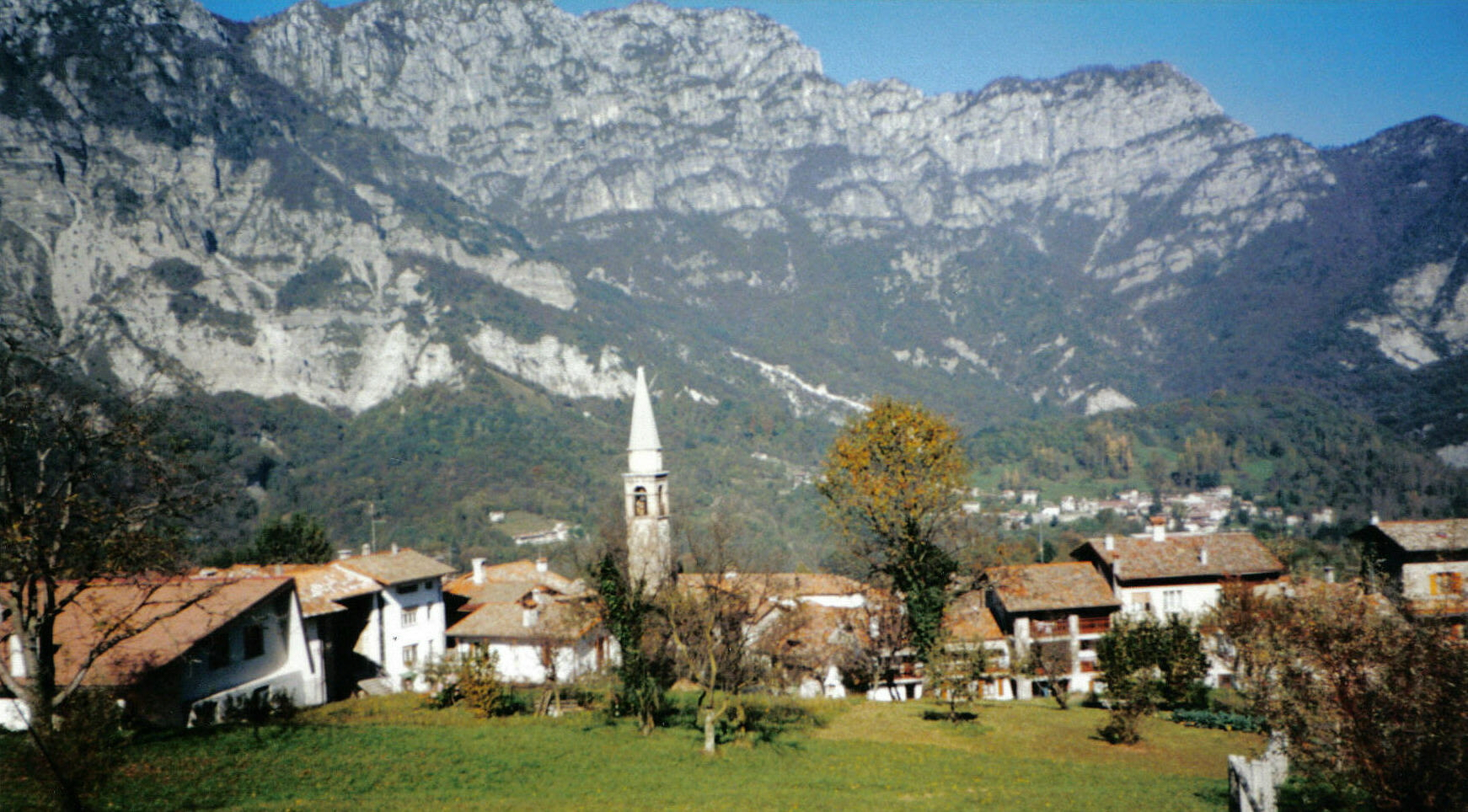

- Coat of arms

- Location within Italy Location within Friuli-Venezia Giulia
- Coordinates: 46°13′N 12°44′E
- Country: Italy
- Region: Friuli-Venezia Giulia
- Province: Pordenone (PN)
- Frazioni: Poffabro, Casasola, Colvere

Government
  - Mayor: Sandro Rovedo

Area
  - Total: 61 km^{2} (24 sq mi)
- Elevation: 500 m (1,600 ft)

Population (31 December 2008)
  - Total: 702
  - Density: 12/km^{2} (30/sq mi)
- Demonym: Frisanchini
- Time zone: UTC+1 (CET)
  - Summer (DST): UTC+2 (CEST)
- Postal code: 33080
- Dialing code: 0427

Frisanco (Friulian: Frisanc) is a town and comune (municipality) in the Regional decentralization entity of Pordenone in the region of Friuli-Venezia Giulia, north-eastern Italy. Its frazione (borough) of Poffabro is one of I Borghi più belli d'Italia ("The most beautiful villages of Italy").

== History ==
As early as 1492 a church stood in the center of the village.

A fire swept through the mountain village in 1606, destroying much of the town including all of the town's public and religious records. In the archives of the Curia of Udine there are the documents from 1648 to 1650 regarding a trial of the inquisition against witches who were said to meet for sabbats in the meadow of Malgustât, behind Mt. Raut. In one document it is written that the, "village of Frisanco in particular is said to be the witches’ nest".

On 28 September 1810 by Napoleonic decree Frisanco became the administrative center of the Val Colvera which included annexing Poffabro.

== Main sights ==
- Palazzo Pognici, built in 1600. It has its own square and fountain.
- Di Lorenzo Courtyard has a Christian fresco which dates back to June 6, 1782.
- The current church's bell tower, completed in 1901, rises high above the small clusters of buildings which makes up the town comprising two- and three-story buildings.

The Colvera, with the old road on the left, now bypassed by the tunnel.

== Culture ==
As of 2007, there is an annual circus arts festival, Brocante, based in Frisanco. There are shows in Frisanco and neighboring villages. The festival takes place in late July and lasts for four days, ending with a parade through the older parts of Frisanco.

== Villages ==
Colvere (Colvuri in Friulian) lies in the Val Colvera, and takes its name from the stream. It has five borghi (boroughs), Gobbo and Cudili on the west bank of the Colvera, Fornasatte, Polàz and Mènis on the east bank. In the 17th and 18th centuries, the west bank was mostly settled by people from Casasola, and from Poffabro on the west bank.

== Sources ==
- Giuseppe Ferroli, I Magnifici Borghi, Frisanco, Poffabro, Casasola, Cementizillo, 2004
