= List of Friulian place names =

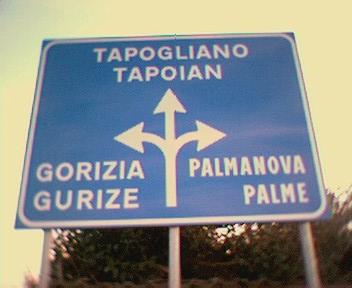
A bilingual street sign in Italian and Friulian

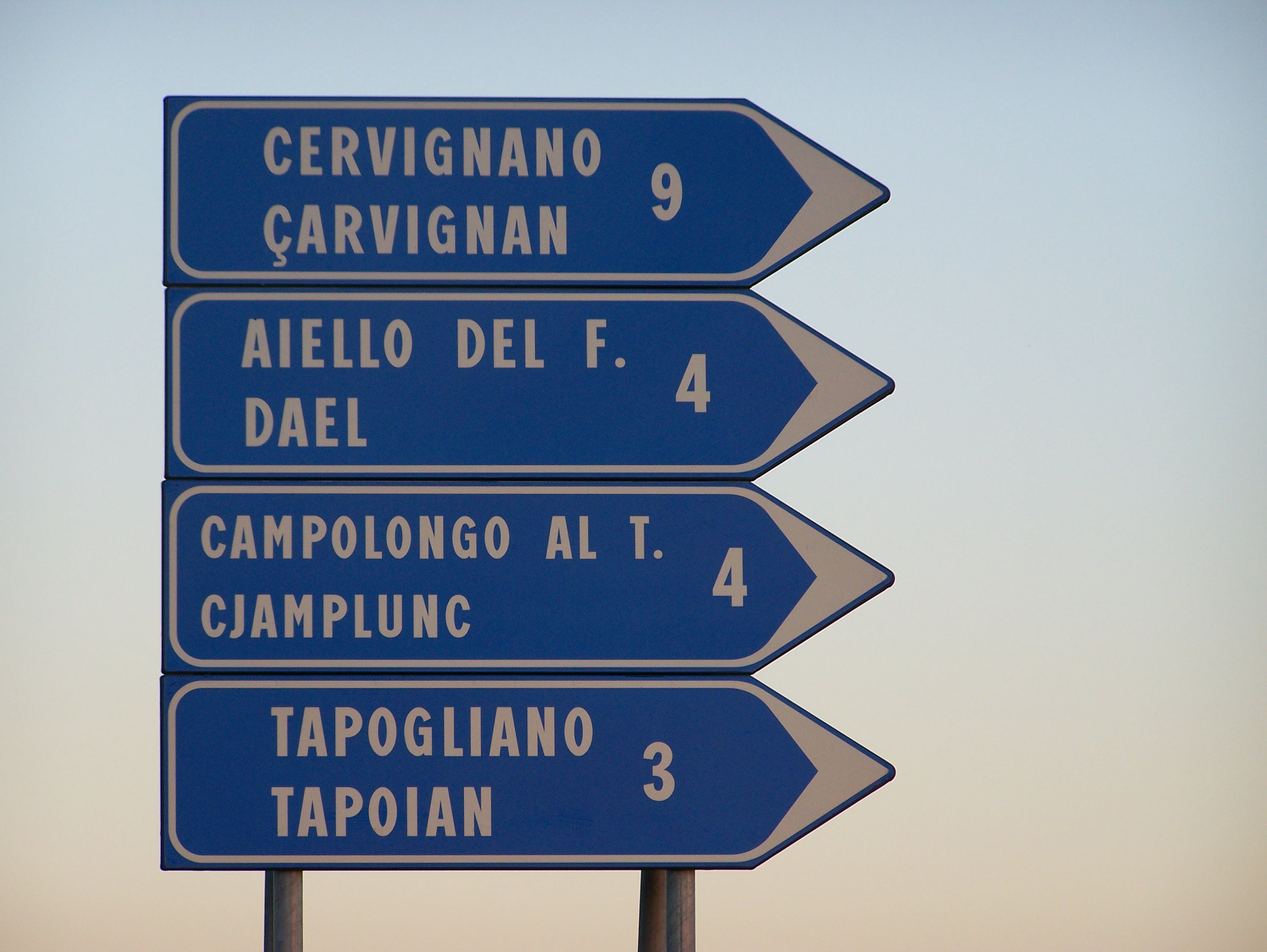
Bilingual road sign (Italian and Friulian) near San Vito al Torre

This is a list in both Italian and Friulian language of place names in the historical area of Friuli, Italy, with the official spelling standard published by ARLeF - Regional Agency for the Friulian Language in 2009. Grave accents ( ` ) on the Friulian forms are to show syllable stress but are rarely written except when placed on the ultimate syllable. Italics are used for the names of municipalities that are not included within the area subject to protection of the Friulian language minority. These names are divided according to the former Italian province in which they lay. From the historical point of view, both the Italian and Friulian forms are found in medieval documents. In some cases, though, Italian names were created by the fascist regime to Italianise the region.

== Municipalities in the province of Gorizia ==
Italian (map form)	Standard Friulian	Local Friulian	Other forms / Notes
Capriva del Friuli	Caprive^{[B]}	Capriva^{[B]}	Slovenian: Koprivno;^{[C]} German: Kapriwa^{[C]}
Cormons	Cormòns^{[B]}		Alternative Friulian: Carmòns;^{[C]} Slovenian: Krmin;^{[C]} German: Kormann,^{[C]} Kremann,^{[C]} Kremaun^{[C]}
Doberdò del Lago	Doberdò^{[D]}		Alternative Friulian: Dobardò;^{[C]} Slovenian: Doberdob^{[A]}^{[C]}
Dolegna del Collio	Dolègne dal Cuèi^{[B]}	Dolegna dal Cuei^{[B]}	Slovenian: Dolenje;^{[C]}
Farra d'Isonzo	Fare^{[B]}	Fara^{[B]}	Slovenian: Fara;^{[C]} German: Pfarre an der Sontig^{[C]}
Fogliano Redipuglia	Foiàn Redipùie^{[D]}, Foiàn Redipùlie		Bisiacco: Foiàn Redipùie,^{[A]} Foiàn Ridipùie;^{[A]} Slovenian: Foljan;^{[C]} German: Volian^{[C]}
Gorizia	Gurìze^{[B]}	Guriza^{[B]}	Slovenian: Gorica;^{[C]} German: Görz^{[C]}
Gradisca d'Isonzo	Gardìscje^{[B]}	Gardiscja^{[B]}	Alternative Friulian: Gradìscje,^{[C]} Gradìscje Imperiâl;^{[C]} Slovenian: Gradišče,^{[C]} Gradiška;^{[C]} German: Gradis an der Sontig^{[C]}
Grado	Grau^{[D]}		Gradese: Gravo;^{[C]} Slovenian: Grádež;^{[C]} German: Grad^{[C]}
Mariano del Friuli	Mariàn^{[B]}		
Medea	Migjèe^{[B]}	Migjea^{[B]}	
Monfalcone	Monfalcòn^{[B]}		Bisiacco: Mafalcòn,^{[C]} Mofalcòn;^{[A]} Slovenian: Trzič;^{[C]} German: Falkenberg;^{[C]} Historical German: Neumarkt,^{[C]} Newenmarck in Fryawl^{[C]}
Moraro	Morâr^{[B]}		
Mossa	Mòsse^{[B]}	Mossa^{[B]}	Slovenian: Móš;^{[C]} German: Mossau^{[C]}
Romans d'Isonzo	Romàns dal Lusinç^{[B]}	Romans^{[B]}	German: Romein an der Sontig^{[C]}
Ronchi dei Legionari	Ròncjis di Monfalcon^{[D]}		Bisiacco: Ronchi^{[A]}; Slovenian: Ronke;^{[C]} German: Ronkis^{[C]}
Sagrado	Segrât^{[B]}		Alternative Friulian: Sagrât;^{[C]} Bisiacco: Segra^{[A]}; Slovenian: Zagraj^{[C]}
San Canzian d'Isonzo	San Canziàn,^{[D]} Sant Canziàn dal Lusìnç		Alternative Friulian: San Cjanciàn;^{[C]} Bisiacco: Sancansiàn; Slovenian: Škocjan;^{[C]} Historical German: Sand Cancian bey Lisoncz^{[C]}
San Floriano del Collio	San Floreàn dal Cuèi^{[C]}		Slovenian: Števerjan^{[C]}
San Lorenzo Isontino	San Lurìnç Lisuntìn^{[B]}	San Lurinz^{[B]}	Alternative Friulian: San Laurìnç (di Mosse);^{[C]} Slovenian: Šlovrenc^{[C]}
San Pier d'Isonzo	San Pièri dal Lusìnç^{[C]}		Alternative Friulian: San Pièri dai Bisiàcs,^{[C]} San Pièri dal Teritòri,^{[C]} San Pièri dal Tiritòri;^{[D]} Bisiacco: San Piero;^{[A]} Slovenian: Špéter^{[C]}
Savogna d'Isonzo	Savògne dal Lusìnç		Alternative Friulian: Savògne di Gurìze;^{[C]} Slovenian: Sovodnje ob Soči,^{[A]} Sovódnje;^{[C]} German: Savoden an der Sontig^{[C]}
Staranzano	Staranzàn^{[D]}		Alternative Friulian: Starançàn;^{[C]} Slovenian: Štarancan;^{[C]} German: Strenzan^{[C]}
Turriaco	Turiàc^{[D]}		Alternative Friulian: Turïà;^{[C]} Bisiacco: Turiàc; Slovenian: Turjak;^{[C]} German: Turiach^{[C]}
Villesse	Vilès^{[B]}		Slovenian: Vileš^{[C]}

== Municipalities in the province of Pordenone ==
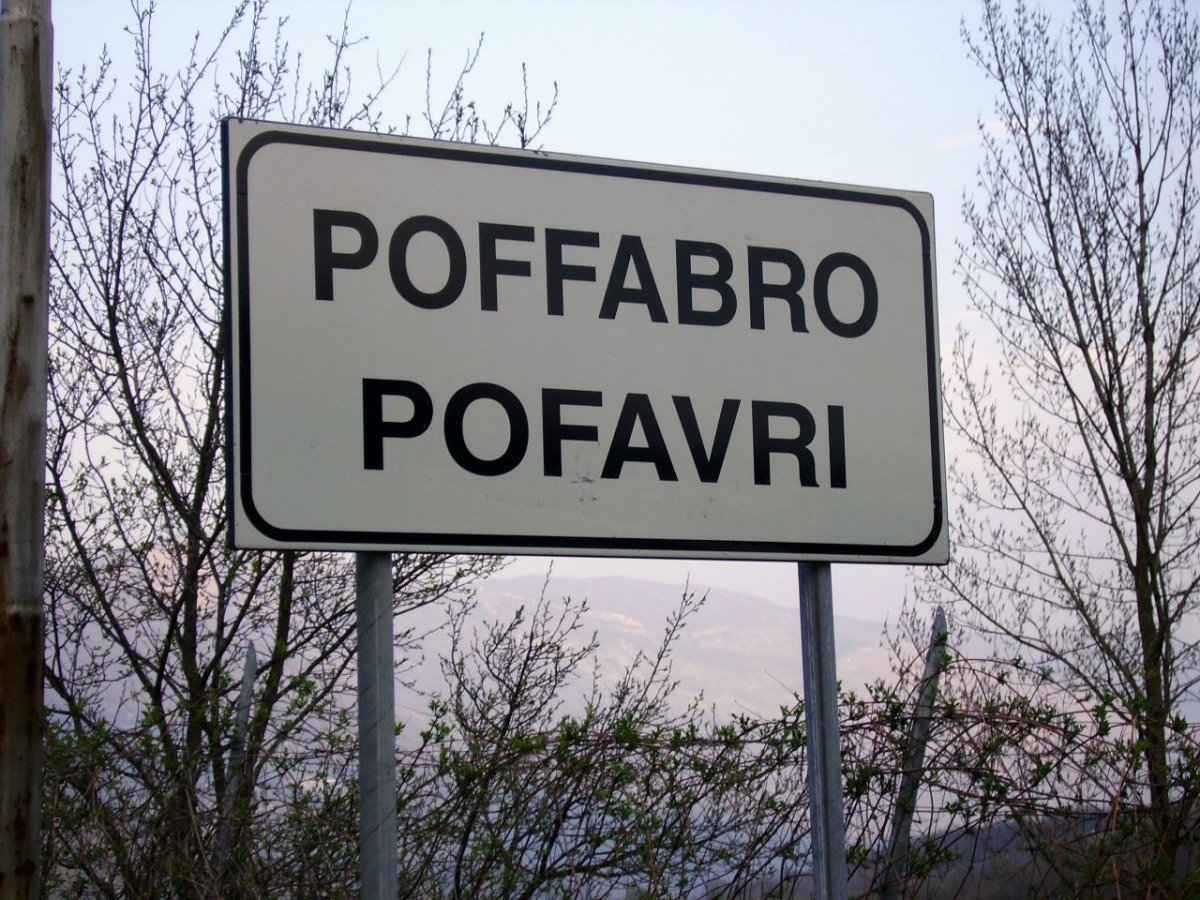
Bilingual sign of Poffabro/Pofàvri

Italian	Friulian standard	Friulian local
Andreis	Andreis	Andrees
Arba	Darbe	Darba
Arzene	Darzin
Aviano	Davian	Pleif
Azzano Decimo	Daçan di Pordenon	Dassan
Barcis	Barcis	Barce
Brugnera	Brugnere
Budoia	Budoie	Buduoia
Caneva	Cjanive di Sacîl
Casarsa della Delizia	Cjasarse	Ciasarsa
Castelnovo del Friuli	Cjastelgnûf	Cjastelnouf
Cavasso Nuovo	Cjavàs
Chions	Cjons
Cimolais	Cimolais
Claut	Claut	Cjolt
Clauzetto	Clausêt	Clausiet
Cordenons	Cordenons
Cordovado	Cordovât
Erto e Casso	Nert e Cjas	Nert Cas
Fanna	Fane	Fana
Fiume Veneto	Vile di Flum
Fontanafredda	Fontanefrede	Fontanafredha
Frisanco	Frisanc
Maniago	Manià
Meduno	Midun
Montereale Valcellina	Montreâl
Morsano al Tagliamento	Morsan da lis Ocjis	Morsan
Pasiano di Pordenone	Pasian di Pordenon
Pinzano al Tagliamento	Pinçan
Poffabro	Pofàvri
Polcenigo	Polcenic	Al Borc
Porcia	Purcie
Pordenone	Pordenon
Prata di Pordenone	Prate
Pravisdomini	Pravisdomini
Roveredo in Piano	Lavorêt
Sacile	Sacîl
San Giorgio della Richinvelda	San Zorç da la Richinvelde	San 'Sors
San Martino al Tagliamento	Sant Martin dal Tiliment
San Quirino	Sant Quarin
San Vito al Tagliamento	San Vît dal Tiliment	San Vît
Sequals	Secuals
Sesto al Reghena	Siest
Spilimbergo	Spilimberc
Tramonti di Sopra	Tramonç Disore	Vildisora
Tramonti di Sotto	Tramonç Disot	Vildisot
Travesio	Travês
Vajont	Vaiont
Valvasone	Voleson
Vito d'Asio	Vît
Vivaro	Vivâr
Zoppola	Çopule	Sopula

== Municipalities in the province of Udine ==
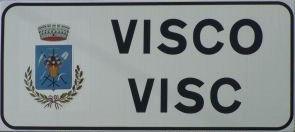
Bilingual sign of Visc(o)

Italian	Friulian standard	Friulian local
Aiello del Friuli	Dael
Amaro	Damâr
Ampezzo	Dimpeç
Aquileia	Aquilee	Aquilea
Arta Terme	Darte
Artegna	Dartigne
Attimis	Atimis
Bagnaria Arsa	Bagnarie
Basiliano	Basilian
Bertiolo	Bertiûl
Bicinicco	Bicinins
Bordano	Bordan
Buja	Buie
Buttrio	Buri
Camino al Tagliamento	Cjamin dal Tiliment	Cjamin
Campoformido	Cjampfuarmit
Campolongo Tapogliano	Cjamplunc Tapoian
Carlino	Cjarlins
Cassacco	Cjassà
Castions di Strada	Cjasteons di Strade
Cavazzo Carnico	Cjavaç
Cercivento	Çurçuvint
Cervignano del Friuli	Çarvignan	Sarvignan
Chiopris-Viscone	Cjopris e Viscon
Chiusaforte	Scluse
Cividale del Friuli	Cividât	Sividât
Codroipo	Codroip
Colloredo di Monte Albano	Colorêt di Montalban
Comeglians	Comelians
Corno di Rosazzo	Cuar di Rosacis
Coseano	Cosean
Dignano	Dignan
Dogna	Dogne
Drenchia	Drencje
Enemonzo	Enemonç
Faedis	Faedis
Fagagna	Feagne
Fiumicello	Flumisel
Flaibano	Flaiban
Forgaria nel Friuli	Forgjarie	Forgjaria
Forni Avoltri	For Davuatri
Forni di Sopra	For Disore	For Disora
Forni di Sotto	For Disot
Gemona del Friuli	Glemone
Gonars	Gonârs
Grimacco	Grimac
Latisana	Tisane	Tisana
Lauco	Lauc
Lestizza	Listize	Listisse
Lignano Sabbiadoro	Lignan
Ligosullo	Liussûl	Liussjûl
Lusevera	Lusevare
Magnano in Riviera	Magnan
Majano	Maian
Malborghetto Valbruna	Malborghet e Valbrune
Manzano	Manzan
Marano Lagunare	Maran
Martignacco	Martignà
Mereto di Tomba	Merêt di Tombe
Moggio Udinese	Mueç
Moimacco	Muimans
Montenars	Montenârs
Mortegliano	Mortean
Moruzzo	Murùs
Muzzana del Turgnano	Muçane	Muzane
Nimis	Nimis
Osoppo	Osôf
Ovaro	Davâr
Pagnacco	Pagnà
Palazzolo dello Stella	Palaçûl	Palassôl
Palmanova	Palme
Paluzza	Paluce
Pasian di Prato	Pasian di Prât
Paularo	Paulâr
Pavia di Udine	Pavie
Pocenia	Pucinie
Pontebba	Pontêbe	Ponteibe
Porpetto	Porpêt
Povoletto	Paulêt
Pozzuolo del Friuli	Puçui
Pradamano	Pradaman
Prato Carnico	Prât di Cjargne	Prât
Precenicco	Prissinins
Premariacco	Premariâs
Preone	Preon
Prepotto	Prepot
Pulfero	Pulfar
Ragogna	Ruvigne
Ravascletto	Ravasclêt
Raveo	Raviei
Reana del Rojale	Reane dal Roiâl
Remanzacco	Remanzâs
Resia	Resie
Resiutta	Resiute
Rigolato	Rigulât
Rive d'Arcano	Rivis Darcjan	Rives Darcjan
Rivignano	Rivignan
Ronchis	Roncjis
Ruda	Rude	Ruda
San Daniele del Friuli	San Denêl
San Giorgio di Nogaro	San Zorç di Noiâr	San Zorz
San Giovanni al Natisone	San Zuan dal Nadison	San Zuan
San Leonardo	San Lenart
San Pietro al Natisone	San Pieri dai Sclavons
San Vito al Torre	San Vît de Tor
San Vito di Fagagna	San Vît di Feagne	San Vît
Santa Maria la Longa	Sante Marie la Lungje
Sauris	Sauris
Savogna	Savogne
Sedegliano	Sedean
Socchieve	Soclêf	Socleif
Stregna	Stregne
Sutrio	Sudri
Taipana	Taipane
Talmassons	Talmassons
Tarcento	Tarcint
Tarvisio	Tarvis
Tavagnacco	Tavagnà
Teor	Teôr
Terzo d'Aquileia	Tierç di Aquilee	Tiars
Tolmezzo	Tumieç
Torreano	Torean
Torviscosa	Tor di Zuin	Il Tor
Trasaghis	Trasaghis	Trasagas
Treppo Carnico	Trep di Cjargne
Treppo Grande	Trep Grant
Tricesimo	Tresesin
Trivignano Udinese	Trivignan
Udine	Udin
Varmo	Vildivar
Venzone	Vençon
Verzegnis	Verzegnis	Verzegnas
Villa Santina	Vile di Cjargne	Vile
Villa Vicentina	Vile Visintine	La Vila
Visco	Visc
Zuglio	Zui

== Municipalities in the province of Belluno ==
One comune (municipality) in the Province of Belluno, Sappada, was historically part of Friuli. In 2010, the comune formally asked to become part of Friuli-Venezia Giulia and the Regional Council of Friuli-Venezia Giulia accepted the municipality's demand. Other comuni in the Province of Belluno are listed in the Friulian place names outside of Friuli section below.

Italian (map form)	Standard Friulian	Other forms / Notes
Sappada	Sapàde^{[D]}	Plodarsich Bavarian: Plodn;^{[C]} German: Pladen^{[C]}

== Municipalities in the Metropolitan City of Venice ==
Several comuni (municipalities) in the eastern part of the Metropolitan City of Venice (formerly the Province of Venice) between the rivers Livenza and Tagliamento in the region known as the Mandamento of Portogruaro were historically part of Friuli. The Friulian names of these comuni are listed here. Other comuni in the Province of Venice are listed in the Friulian place names outside of Friuli section below. It is estimated that 29% of the population in these areas speaks fluent Friuli. The language is officially recognized and has been protected as a minority language since 2006.

Italian (map form)	Standard Friulian	Other forms / Notes
Annone Veneto	Danòn^{[D]}	Local Venetian (Liventino): Danón; Venetian: Anon
Caorle	Cjàurlis^{[D]}	Alternative Friulian: Cjàorle;^{[C]} Venetian: Càorle
Cinto Caomaggiore	Cint^{[D]}	Alternative Friulian: Cinto;^{[C]} Venetian: Sinto Caomagior
Concordia Sagittaria	Cuncuàrdie^{[D]}	Alternative Friulian: Concuàrdie;^{[C]} Venetian: Concordia
Fossalta di Portogruaro	Fossàlte^{[D]}	Venetian: Fosalta de Portogruaro
Gruaro	Gruâr^{[D]}	Venetian: Gruèr, Gruàr
Portogruaro	Puàrt di Gruâr^{[D]}	Alternative Friulian: Puàrt,^{[C]} Puàrt Gruâr;^{[C]} Local Venetian: Portogruèr; Venetian: Pòrto; German: Portogruar^{[C]}
Pramaggiore	Pramaiôr^{[D]}	Venetian: Pramagiòr, Pramajor
San Michele al Tagliamento	San Michêl^{[D]}	Alternative Friulian: San Micjêl;^{[C]} Venetian: San Michièl al Tajamento
San Stino di Livenza	San Stin^{[D]}	Italian until 2011: Santo Stino di Livenza; Venetian: San Stin dea Livensa
Teglio Veneto	Tei^{[D]}	Venetian: Tejo Vèneto

== Friulian place names outside of Friuli ==
=== Italy ===
==== Comuni in the Province of Trieste ====
Following is a list of all comuni (municipalities) in the Province of Trieste. Although part of the region of Friuli-Venezia Giulia, the province is not part of Friuli proper.

Italian (map form)	Standard Friulian	Other forms / Notes
Duino-Aurisina	Duin-Nabresine^{[D]}	Triestine: Duìn-Nabresina; Slovenian: Devin Nabrežina;^{[E]} German: Thübein-Nabreschin, Tybein-Nabreschin
Monrupino	Monrupin	Triestine: Monrupin; Slovenian: Repentabor;^{[E]} German: Reippen
Muggia	Mugle^{[D]}	Triestine: Muja;^{[A]} Slovenian: Milje;^{[E]} German: Mugls
San Dorligo della Valle	San Durlì	Triestine: Dolina; Slovenian: Dolina;^{[E]} German: Dolina
Sgonico	Sgonic	Triestine: Sgonico; Slovenian: Zgonik;^{[E]} German: Sgonegg
Trieste	Triest^{[D]}	Triestine: Trièst; Slovenian: Trst;^{[E]} German: Triest

==== Comuni in the Veneto ====
Following is a list of select comuni (municipalities) bearing Friulian-language names in the Italian region of Veneto which borders Friuli. Note that comuni in the historically Friulian area of the Mandamento of Portogruaro are listed above in the Municipalities in the Metropolitan City of Venice section.

Italian (map form)	Standard Friulian	Other forms / Notes
Belluno	Belun^{[D]}	Venetian: Belun
Conegliano	Conean^{[D]}	Venetian: Conejan
Cortina d'Ampezzo	Cortine Dimpeç	Venetian: Cortina d'Anpezo
Longarone	Longaron^{[D]}	Venetian: Longaron
Lorenzago di Cadore	Lorençâc^{[D]}	Venetian: Lorenzago de Cador
Padova (English: Padua)	Padue	Venetian: Pàdova or, rarely, Pàdoa
Pieve di Cadore	Plêf di Cjadovri	Venetian: Pieve de Cador
Rovigo	Ruvì	Venetian: Rovigo
San Pietro di Cadore	San Pieri in Cjadovri^{[D]}	Venetian: San Piero de Cador
Santo Stefano di Cadore	San Scjefin in Cjadovri^{[D]}	Venetian: San Sten de Cador
Treviso	Trevîs^{[D]}	Venetian: Trevixo
Venezia (English: Venice)	Vignesie^{[D]}	
Verona	Verone	Venetian: Verona
Vicenza	Vicenze	Venetian: Vicensa
Vittorio Veneto	Cènede^{[D]}	Venetian: Vitòrio, formerly Zèneda

=== Austria ===
==== Carinthia ====
Following is a list of cities, municipalities, and other settlements bearing Friulian-language names in the Austrian federal state of Carinthia which borders Friuli.

German (map form)	Standard Friulian	Other forms / Notes
Arnoldstein	Orestagn^{[D]}	Slovenian: Podklošter;^{[E]} Italian: Oristagno
Bad Bleiberg	Plàipar^{[D]}	Slovenian: Pliberk,^{[E]} Plajberk pri Beljaku
Feistritz an der Gail	Feistris	Slovenian: Bistrica na Zilji
Göriach	Ghèrie^{[D]}	Slovenian: Gorje
Goritschach	Gherce^{[D]}	Slovenian: Goriče pri Beljaku
Guggenberg	Gumpèrc	
Hermagor	Sant Armacul^{[D]}	Alternative Friulian: San Mecôr; Slovenian: Šmohor;^{[E]} Italian: Sant'Ermagora
Kirchbach	Chirpe^{[D]}	Slovenian: Cirkno
Klagenfurt	Clanfurt	Slovenian: Celovec; Italian: Clanforte
Kötschach-Mauthen	Catès-Mude^{[D]}	Slovenian: Koča-Muta
Maria Luggau	Madone di Lucàu	
Plöcken	Stàli	
Reisach im Gailtal	Raise^{[D]}	Slovenian: Riže
Sankt Stefan an der Gail	San Stiefin^{[D]}	Slovenian: Štefan,^{[E]} Štefan na Zilji
Sankt Stefan im Gailtal	Sant Scjefin di Carintie	Slovenian: Štefan na Zilji
Sankt Veit an der Glan	Sant Vît di Carintie	Slovenian: Šentvid ob Glini
Thörl	Terle^{[D]}	Slovenian: Vrata
Tröpolach	Trepule^{[D]}	Slovenian: Dropolje^{[E]}
Villach	Vilac^{[D]}	Slovenian: Beljak;^{[E]} Italian: Villaco
Warmbad Villach	Bagns di Vilac^{[D]}	Slovenian: Toplice pri Beljaku
Würmlach	Virmule	Slovenian: Bumlje

== See also ==
- List of municipalities of Friuli-Venezia Giulia
