= Lake Ragogna =

Natural marshy lake in Friuli-Venezia Giulia, Italy

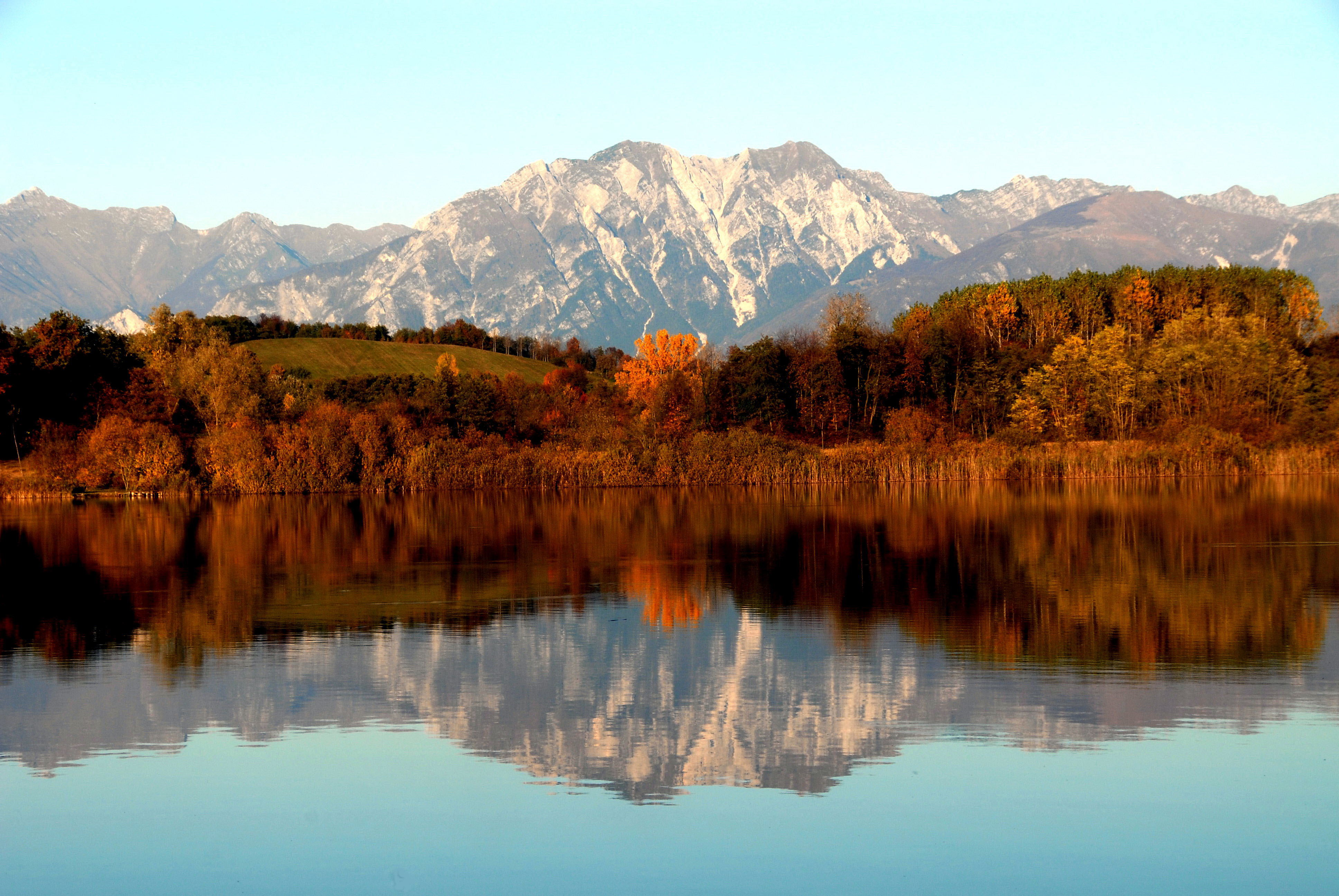

- Location of Lake Ragogna
- Location: Ragogna, San Daniele del Friuli, Province of Udine, Friuli-Venezia Giulia, Italy
- Coordinates: 46.173522°N 12.98242°E
- Type: Glacial
- Primary inflows: Subterranean spring, small streams
- Surface area: 0.25 km^{2} (0.097 sq mi)
- Average depth: 9.3 m (31 ft)
- Water volume: 800 m^{3} (28,000 cu ft)
- Surface elevation: 188 m (617 ft)

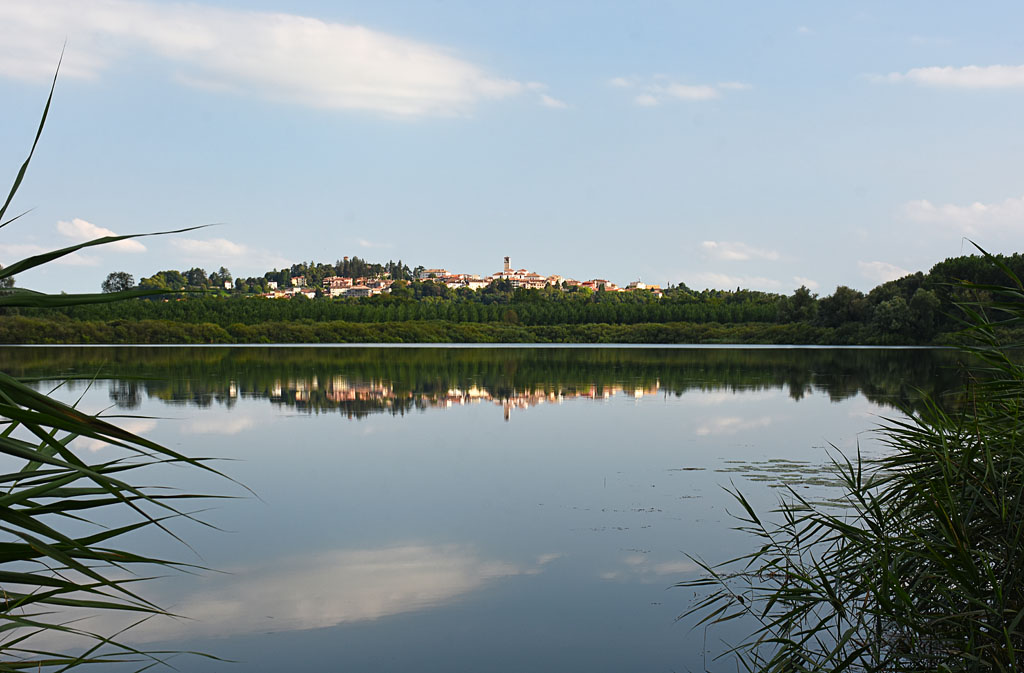
Lake Ragogna and San Daniele

The Lake Ragogna (Lât di Ruvigne in standard Friulan) is a natural marshy area located between the municipalities of Ragogna and San Daniele del Friuli, in the Province of Udine.

== Geography ==
Of glacial origin, the lake formed about 12,000 years ago in a depression among the hills. The basin is elliptical in shape, with a diameter of approximately 700 m, a maximum depth of 9–10 m, and a surface area of 25 ha.

The lake is fed, in addition to atmospheric precipitation, by a subterranean spring and small streams flowing from the surrounding hills.

A short distance to the north lies an ancient Jewish cemetery.

== Details ==
With a surface area of 25 hectares and its current size—about a quarter of its original dimensions due to reclamation carried out in the 1930s—it has a depth reaching 9–10 meters. In addition to rainfall, the lake is fed by several streams descending from the southern slopes of the mountain and surrounding hills and by a subterranean spring located in the northwest area near the current bathymeter. Archaeological research has uncovered historical evidence dating back to the Late Mesolithic and Early Neolithic (5000 BCE), belonging to an agricultural community that settled on the lake's shores.

Visitors can admire several historical and naturalistic features, such as the ancient stone quarry, called "gjave di Kric", located on the southern slope of the hill opposite the bathymeter, where circular holes made for inserting explosives can still be observed. The quarry remained active until the 1950s. One of the most interesting aspects of Lake Ragogna is its biodiversity, a highly complex phenomenon from both the flora and fauna perspectives. The area surrounding the water body is characterized by marshy terrain, home to marsh reeds and rushes, while various types of water lilies grow in the water basin, offering a unique spectacle in spring with a mosaic of colors.

== Flora and fauna ==
Extremely interesting from a naturalistic and environmental perspective, Lake Ragogna is one of the few lakes where the "castagna d'acqua" (Trapa natans) still grows. This is an aquatic plant with rhomboidal/lanceolate and toothed leaves, characterized by a woody, brownish-red fruit with four spines. This edible fruit, used for food since prehistoric times, was harvested at the end of summer and, once dried, ground into flour.

Surrounded by sheltered groves of alders, poplars, and willows, reedbeds, peat bogs, and wet meadows, it is highly significant from a faunistic perspective as a transit point for migratory birds, such as mallard, coot, garganey, moorhen, grey heron, little grebe, great crested grebe, loon, mute swan, bittern, and tufted duck (Aythya fuligula), making it an ideal location for birdwatching.

The fish fauna is also particularly rich; species present include chub, carp, tench, pike, perch, rudd, and pumpkinseed.

== Technical data ==
- Surface area: 0.25 km²
- Catchment basin area: 5.13 km²
- Average altitude: 188 m a.s.l.
- Maximum catchment basin altitude: 512 m a.s.l.
- Maximum depth: 9.3 m
- Volume: 0.8 million m³
