= Friulian revolt of 1511 =

Military conflict

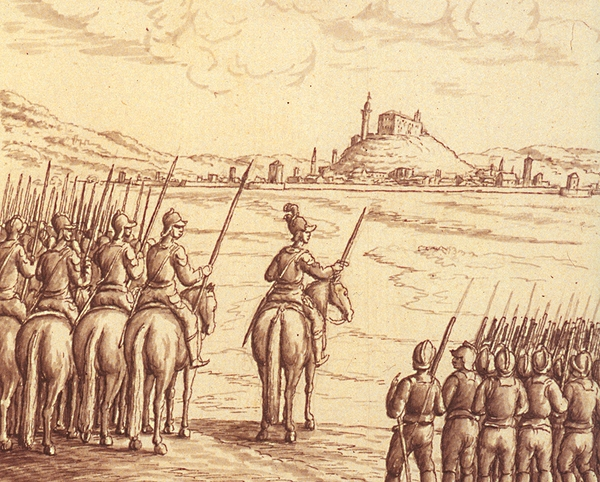
Antonio Savorgnan outside Udine with his cernide on 27 February 1511 (eighteenth century drawing)

The revolt of Cruel Fat Thursday (Venetian: Crudel zobia grassa, Friulian: Crudêl joibe grasse) was a revolt that broke out on Fat Thursday in 1511 in Friuli in Northeast Italy.

== Background ==
=== Discontent in Friuli ===
After less than a century of Venetian occupation of the Friuli the discontent caused by the heavy privileges enjoyed by the clergy and nobility started to spread out among the population. To worsen the situation, the noble families were in constant war between themselves, which caused an increase of taxes, devastation of territory, and a necessity to serve in one's master's army.

By the 16th-century, the Venetian Republic had not granted Friuli the same status as the other mainland domains (domini di terra), but nevertheless considered the territory important as a buffer against the Ottoman armies. The second class status of the region was reflected in a paucity of investments in the mainly rural region for social and economical development.

This led to the region being isolated from Venice, and thus an absence of any communal governance structures. This exacerbated the discontent of the peasant communities in this still mainly feudal rural area. In response the local nobility, deprived of its former power by the government of Venice, tried to maintain its social status by exploiting their remaining rights and demanding services from the peasants.

=== First popular uprisings ===
The first tumults began as early as 1509, when a crowd of armed peasants took possession of the castle in Sterpo, chased out the inhabitants, and set it on fire. This was the last act of a clash that had been dragging on for some time, between the inhabitants of Virco, Flambro, and Sivigliano against the aristocratic Colloredo family, the owners of the castle, who were accused of usurping the community's pastures and woods for their own advantage.

It was this event that caught the public's attention, as for some time, the whole region was shaken by disputes and skirmishes stirred up by the peasants against the nobility, their families, soldiers, servants, and representatives. Clashes occurred in Spilimbergo, Maniago, Valvasone, Portogruaro, Colloredo and Tarcento.

In 1510, a group of Friulan noblemen were returning from Venice, where they had asked greater protection against the disorder. They were intercepted and chased away by a group of armed peasants at the height of Zompicchia, an act known as the Ambush of Malazumpicchia.

=== Coalitions on the eve of Fat Thursday 1511 ===
The Savorgnan, an aristocratic family of Udine, who had been declared pro-Venetian, took advantage of the disorders for personal gain.

Their politics was based on a patronage system that tied them directly to the population. They granted rights within their jurisdictions to the peasants or conferred old customs of land exploitation. In case of crop failure, they opened their stores to the starving population, provided loans, and listened to the neighborhood vicinie (assemblies) representatives' opinions.

This protection system intentionally created a clan, whose members became known as zamberlani, identified with the charismatic figure of Antonio Savorgnan, who was so trusted by the Venetian rulers that he was nominated general commander of the cernide, the armed peasants' militias called up in case of war.

This faction was opposed by the strumieri, which included a number of the old Friulian nobility who could not tolerate the Serenissima's attempts to hold on to their powers. Their head was the Della Torre family, sworn enemies of the Savorgnan family since 1339. The strumieri had also gained the support of the anti-Venetian Habsburg monarchy.

== Outbreak of Fat Thursday revolt ==
On 27 February, 1511, Fat Thursday, Antonio Savorgnan allegedly staged an Imperial attack against Udine, using Cividalian soldiers led by his nephew Luigi da Porto, and calling on the people to defend the city. In the midst of the chaos caused by the failing attack, Savorgnan instigated the plunder of the Della Torre properties. This was followed by a wave of lust for looting, and a plunder of almost all Udinese nobility's palaces (except for the Savorgnan palace) took place.

Many members of the Della Torre, Colloredo, della Frattina, Soldonieri, Gorgo and Bertolini families, amongst others, were murdered; their bodies were stripped and abandoned in the streets of the city centre, or dragged through the mud and then thrown in nearby cemeteries. Then, the rebels put on the nobles' clothes, staging a macabre masquerade and imitating the ways of the original owners, embodying the spirit of "inversion of roles" typical of a carnival. The noblemen who escaped retreated to their castles, or way beyond the Tagliamento river, in western Friuli.

At that point, Antonio Savorgnan's plan concluded and, while he remained officially unlinked to the riots, it had succeeded in eliminating many of his rival family leaders. To avoid a betrayal, he murdered two of his armed men who knew of his involvement in the massacre and dumped the bodies, together with that of a third witness, in the St John's well.

== Revolt suppressed ==
A few days later, an armed contingent from Gradisca arrived and managed to restore the public order, but didn't stop the carnival procession focused on mocking the murdered nobility. Meanwhile, violence spread over the territories bordering Udine and gradually all over the region. The villages' inhabitants, most of them peasants, armed as if for a war, besieged the castles inhabited by the nobility: those of Spilimbergo, Valvasone, Cusano, and Salvarolo and Zoppola were taken by force.

The strumieri troops reorganized close to the castle of Giulio di Porcia, gaining the support of the Venetian ruler of Pordenone, some Sacilians and about 800 inhabitants of Concordia Sagittaria.

The decisive clash took place close to the Cellina river, where the cavalry (circa 70 horsemen) and the best trained strumieri defeated their enemies. As a warning, Giulio hanged one of the rebels' leaders close to the Castle of Zoppola, forcing the prisoners to help.

On 26 March of the same year, a violent earthquake devastated Udine and the entire region, causing thousands of casualties. Later on, the same territories were scourged by the plague: these tragic events were interpreted by contemporaries as a tangible sign of divine justice.

== Aftermath ==
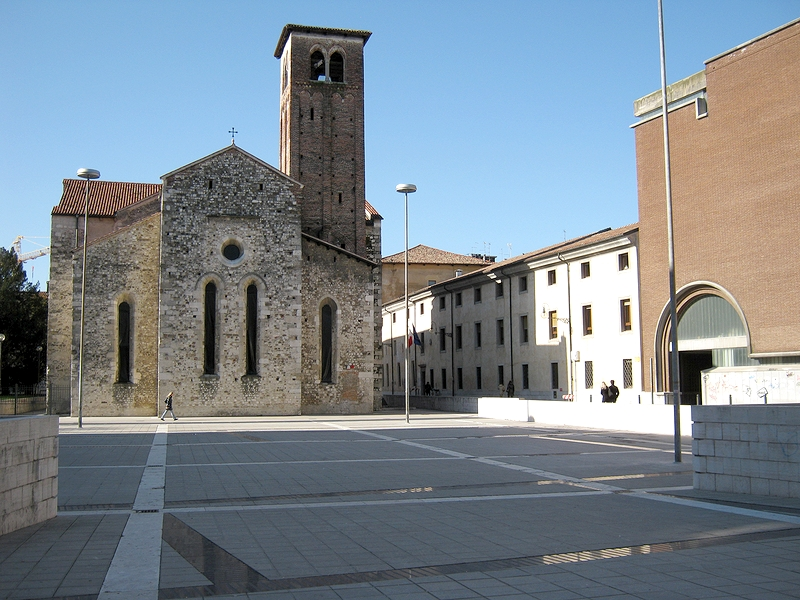
Piazza Venerio and the church of San Francesco. The shiny marble signs indicate the planimetry of Antonio Savorgnan's palace, demolished in 1549.

The Venetian government established a special tribunal that condemned the main leaders of the revolt to death, but failed to judge the real culprit, Antonio Savorgnan who, given the overall negative outcome, paradoxically found shelter among the Imperial ranks which he had so long opposed, and settled in Villach, in the Austrian territory.

He was not free for long: a strumieri conspiracy organized his assassination on 27 May, 1512, at the exit of Villach's St Jacob Church. Both the Spilimbergos and Colloredos were involved.

Upon a shoot-out orchestrated by Tristano Savorgnan, right in the centre of Venice, in which Alvise della Torre Jr. (the youngest son of the leader of the strumieri faction murdered during the massacre) and some members of the Colloredo family were killed, the governor of Venice confiscated the Savorgnan family's assets in 1549 and destroyed their family palace in Udine. The ruins were left as a warning in what was called place de ruine ("square of the ruins") in Friulian, or piazza delle rovine in Italian. It is now called "Venerio Square", after the Udinese metereologist Gerolamo Venerio.

Antonio Savorgnan's death kicked off both the revenge and the retaliation triggered by Fat Thursday's events. The revolt's collective dimension had been erased, and it instead focused on feuds and the settlement of personal accounts. The last duel connected to these events happened in 1568, between Troiano d'Arcano, and Tristano Savorgnan, in which both died.

The great mass of peasants who had participated in the revolt returned to their work in the fields in the same conditions as before, but the governor of Serenissima decided to prevent possible new revolts by making some efforts towards meeting the zamberlani's requests. They therefore set up a peasantry organization, the contadinanza, composed of peasants' representatives who could veto Parliament's proposals.

== Bibliography ==
- Bianco, Furio (1995). La «Crudel zobia grassa». Rivolte contadine e faide nobiliari in Friuli tra '400 e '500. Edizioni Biblioteca dell'Immagine, Pordenone. ISBN 84-9789-258-5.
- Muir, Edward (1998). Mad Blood Stirring: Vendetta and Factions in Friuli During the Renaissance. Johns Hopkins University Press. ISBN 978-0-8018-5849-9. (Reader's edition: Mad Blood Stirring. Vendetta in Renaissance Italy, The Johns Hopkins University Press, 1993, 1998)
- Diarii Udinesi dall'anno 1508 al 1541, Gregorio Amaseo
