= Sedegliano =

Sedegliano Sedean (Friulian)
- Comune
- Comune di Sedegliano
- Location within Italy Location within Friuli-Venezia Giulia
- Coordinates: 46°1′N 12°59′E
- Country: Italy
- Region: Friuli-Venezia Giulia
- Province: Udine (UD)
- Frazioni: Coderno, Gradisca, Grions, Rivis, San Lorenzo, Turrida

Government
  - Mayor: Dino Giacomuzzi

Area
  - Total: 50.4 km^{2} (19.5 sq mi)
- Elevation: 84 m (276 ft)

Population (31 December 2014)
  - Total: 3,900
  - Density: 77/km^{2} (200/sq mi)
- Demonym: Sedeglianesi
- Time zone: UTC+1 (CET)
  - Summer (DST): UTC+2 (CEST)
- Postal code: 33039
- Dialing code: 0432
- Website: Official website

Sedegliano (Friulian: Sedean) is a comune (municipality) in the Regional decentralization entity of Udine in the Italian region of Friuli-Venezia Giulia, located about 80 kilometres (50 mi) northwest of Trieste and about 20 kilometres (12 mi) southwest of Udine.

Sedegliano borders the following municipalities: Codroipo, Coseano, Flaibano, Mereto di Tomba, San Giorgio della Richinvelda, San Martino al Tagliamento, Valvasone.

== People ==
- Massimo Donati, football player
- Plinio Clabassi, operatic bass
