= Provesano =

Coordinates: 46°04′00″N 12°53′12″E

Provesano is a frazione of the comune of San Giorgio della Richinvelda, in the province of Pordenone in Friuli-Venezia Giulia, Italy. The name Provesano is of Roman origin; it consists of Probus or (Publicius) and the suffix –anu, indicating the landed property.

== History ==
There were much people living in Provesano in Roman and pre-Roman times. From the 11th century to 1871 Provesano belonged to the comune of Spilimbergo.In 1871 the people of Provesano wanted to join the comune of San Giorgio della Richinvelda.

== Notable people ==
- Pim Fortuyn, Dutch politician, sociologist, author and professor, assassinated during the Dutch general election of 2002, buried in the cemetery of the frazione Provesano.

== Bibliography ==
- A.A.V.V. Foto d’archivio. San Giorgio della Richinvelda, 1985.
- A.A.V.V. Cultura artigiana del Comune di San Giorgio della Richinvelda, San Giorgio della Richinvelda, 1987.
- A.A.V.V. San Giorgio della Richinvelda. Un Comune e la sua gente. Storia-arte-cultura, San Giorgio della Richinvelda, 1993.
- A.A.V.V. Alla scoperta del comune di San Giorgio della Richinvelda. Pro Loco San Giorgio della Richinvelda, 2014.
- Luigi Luchini, Memorie storiche e cronache recenti. San Giorgio della Richinvelda e frazioni del comune, Portogruaro, 1968.
- Luigi Luchini, La pieve di San Giorgio della Richinvelda, San Giorgio della Richinvelda, 1980.
- Giorgio Moro – Maurizio Roman, La Grande Guerra e il Territorio di San Giorgio della Richinvelda, San Giorgio della Richinvelda, 2013.
- Giorgio Moro – Maurizio Roman, La Seconda Guerra mondiale e il Territorio di San Giorgio della Richinvelda, San Giorgio della Richinvelda, 2015.
