= San Martino al Tagliamento =

- Comune
- Comune di San Martino al Tagliamento
- Location within Italy Location within Friuli-Venezia Giulia
- Coordinates: 46°1′N 12°52′E
- Country: Italy
- Region: Friuli-Venezia Giulia
- Province: Pordenone (PN)
- Frazioni: Arzenutto, Postoncicco, Sant'Osvaldo

Government
  - Mayor: Francesco Del Bianco

Area
  - Total: 17.8 km^{2} (6.9 sq mi)
- Elevation: 71 m (233 ft)

Population (31 December 2010)
  - Total: 1,556
  - Density: 87.4/km^{2} (226/sq mi)
- Demonym: Sammartinesi
- Time zone: UTC+1 (CET)
  - Summer (DST): UTC+2 (CEST)
- Postal code: 33096
- Dialing code: 0434
- Website: http://www.comune.sanmartinoaltagliamento.pn.it/

San Martino al Tagliamento (Slovene: Šmartin; Friulian: San Martin dal Tiliment) is a comune (municipality) in the Regional decentralization entity of Pordenone in the Italian region of Friuli-Venezia Giulia, located about 80 kilometres (50 mi) northwest of Trieste and about 20 kilometres (12 mi) northeast of Pordenone.

San Martino al Tagliamento borders the following municipalities: Arzene, San Giorgio della Richinvelda, Sedegliano, Valvasone.
