= Codroipo =

Codroipo Codroip (Friulian)
- Comune
- Città di Codroipo
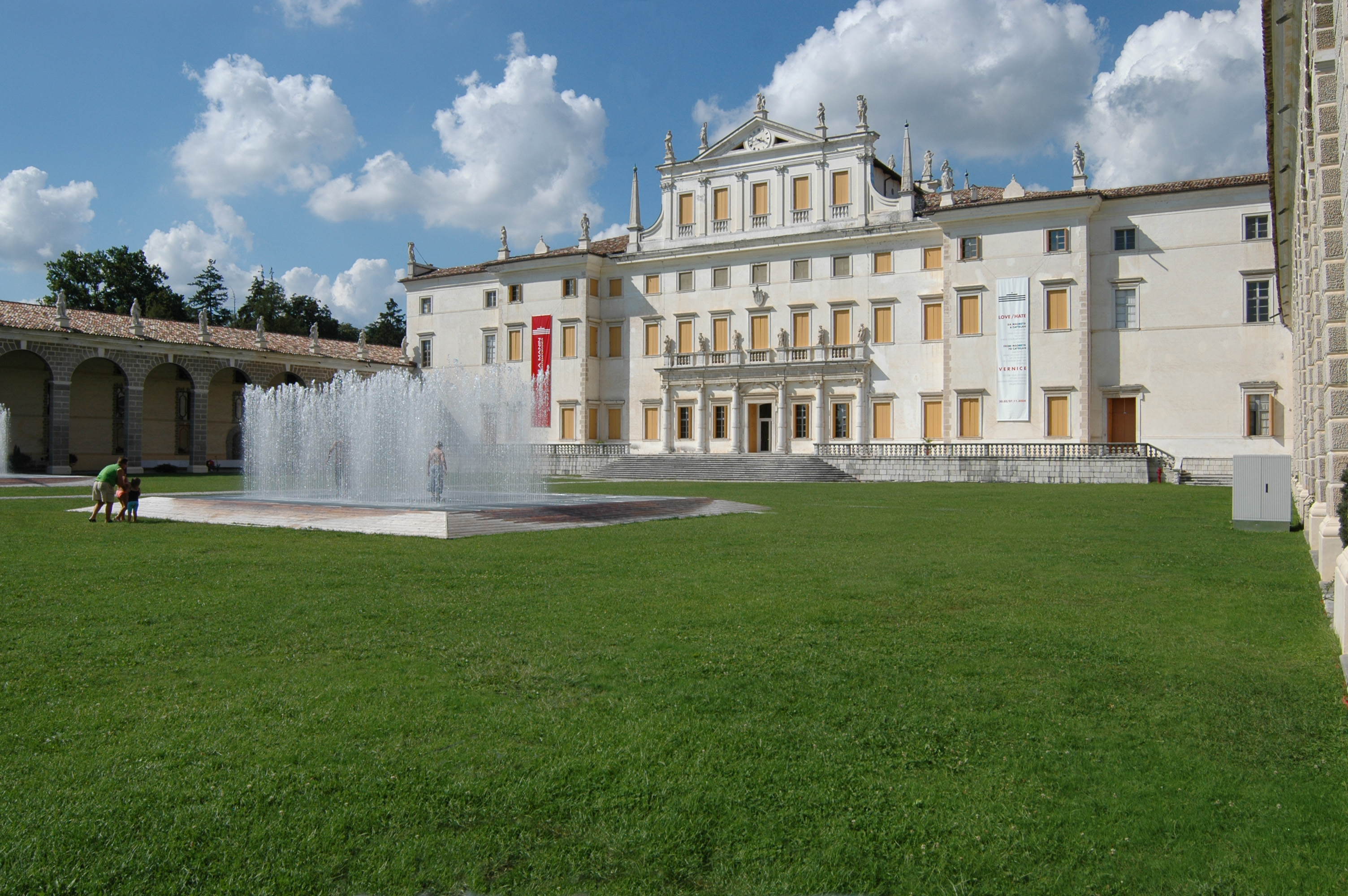
- Villa Manin at Passariano

- Coat of arms

- Location of Codroipo in Italy Codroipo (Friuli-Venezia Giulia)
- Coordinates: 45°57′45″N 12°58′45″E
- Country: Italy
- Region: Friuli-Venezia Giulia
- Province: Udine (UD)
- Frazioni: Passariano, Lonca, Rivolto, Biauzzo, Iutizzo, Pozzo, Rividischia, San Pietro, Muscletto, San Martino, Zompicchia, Goricizza, Beano

Government
  - Mayor: Fabio Marchetti

Area
  - Total: 75.22 km^{2} (29.04 sq mi)
- Elevation: 43 m (141 ft)

Population (30 April 2017)
  - Total: 16,159
  - Density: 214.8/km^{2} (556.4/sq mi)
- Demonym: Codroipesi
- Time zone: UTC+1 (CET)
  - Summer (DST): UTC+2 (CEST)
- Postal code: 33033
- Dialing code: 0432
- ISTAT code: 030027
- Patron saint: Madonna della Neve
- Saint day: 5 August
- Website: Official website

Codroipo (Friulian: Codroip) is a comune (municipality) in the Regional decentralization entity of Udine, in the Italian region of Friuli-Venezia Giulia, located about 70 kilometres (43 mi) northwest of Trieste and about 20 kilometres (12 mi) southwest of Udine.

Codroipo borders the following municipalities: Basiliano, Bertiolo, Camino al Tagliamento, Lestizza, Mereto di Tomba, San Vito al Tagliamento, Sedegliano, Valvasone Arzene, Varmo.

The village of Rivolto (Friulian: Rivolt) hosts the Italian Air Force acrobatic flight squadron, the Frecce Tricolori.

== Territory ==
The municipality of Codroipo extends for 75 km² across the Veneto-Friuli Plain, on the eastern bank of the Tagliamento river, from which it lies about 6 km away, on the border between Upper and Lower Friuli, in the area of resurgences of Middle Friuli, halfway between the cities of Udine and Pordenone, both about 27 km away.

The area is affected by the phenomenon of resurgences, which contributes to the proliferation of streams, irrigation channels and aquatic environments such as lakes and ponds. The persistent action of man has today profoundly changed its nature as a function of monoculture agriculture. However, some areas have been preserved: the Parco delle Risorgive di Codroipo, located south of the town, near the sports centre, offers an example of what the environment was in pre-industrial times.

== History ==
While being recognised as a hill-fort area since the Bronze Age, the settlement acquired relevance during the Roman era, between the first and second century BCE.

The foundation of the original colony in Aquileia dates back to 181 BCE, with a strategic role as crossroads for Res Publica merchants and soldiers. The ancient name Quadruvium (then Quadrupio) is supposedly derived from the four main contrade (quadrivio), which converged thanks to the meeting of two prominent Roman roads: the first, the Via Postumia, linked Aquileia to Genoa, while the second, the Via Julia Augusta, led from Mestre all the way to Norico and they both merged in Udine. Codroipo was a pagus in the municipality of Aquileia until its fall to Attila in 452. Some other roads were the Via Annietta and the Via Crescenzia, which linked Concordia to Gemona and Majano to Lignano Sabbiadoro respectively.

Its history is largely shared with that of Friuli in general and was part of the Republic of Venice. In 1797 the Treaty of Campoformio was signed in a nearby villa owned by Ludovico Manin, marking Napoleon Bonaparte's victory, the fall of the First Coalition, and the cession of Friuli to Austria.

In the final days of World War I, it was occupied by the 332nd Infantry Regiment, the only American military unit in the Italian theater.

== Economy ==
Traditional commercial emporium of Middle Friuli, for a long time the local economy was particularly active in the markets of grain and cattle.

During the 1920s, the extensive cultivation of tobacco spread, and in 1938 a factory was built in the form of a cooperative, for the drying and processing of tobacco.

After World War II, a period of gradual expansion of commercial activities and services began. In particular, during the 1980s, the phenomenon of small family businesses typical of North-East Italy, which witnessed a progressive spread of well-being across the territory accompanied by relative demographic growth net of a parallel reduction of military personnel presence since the 1990s.

The most important companies operate in the construction, thermo-electric, furniture, organ building and viticulture sectors.

== Main sights ==
- The frazione of Passariano is the location of Villa Manin, the family residence of Ludovico Manin, the last doge of the Venetian Republic. It was there that the Treaty of Campoformio (or Campoformido) was signed in 1797. At present the villa is used as a museum, for art exhibitions and for concerts.
- The frazione of Zompicchia saw an ambush of noblemen by peasants during the riots that paved the way to the Friulan Revolt of 1511
- The frazione of Rivolto hosts a military airport. It is the home of the Italian national air display team, the Frecce Tricolori.

== Transport ==
Codroipo railway station is on the Venice–Udine railway line. Train services operate to Venice, Treviso, Udine, Trieste, Padua, Bologna and Rome.

== Twin towns ==
Codroipo is twinned with:

- Braine-le-Comte, Belgium
- Galliera, Italy
- Hrastnik, Slovenia
- Maria Wörth, Austria
