= Giorgio Fidenato =

Italian activist

Giorgio Fidenato (born Mereto di Tomba in Province of Udine, 7 March 1961) is an Italian libertarian farmer, co-founder and coordinator of the Movimento Libertario and secretary of Futuragra a cultural association of Pordenone for technological innovation, business culture, defense of private property and free markets in agriculture.

He is also president of Agricoltori Federati – Italian Federated Farmers.
