= Dignano =

Dignano Dignan (Friulian)
- Comune
- Comune di Dignano
- Coat of arms

- Location within Italy Location within Friuli-Venezia Giulia
- Coordinates: 46°5′N 12°56′E
- Country: Italy
- Region: Friuli-Venezia Giulia
- Province: Udine (UD)
- Frazioni: Carpacco, Vidulis, Bonzicco

Government
  - Mayor: Giambattista Turridano

Area
  - Total: 27.2 km^{2} (10.5 sq mi)
- Elevation: 110 m (360 ft)

Population (March 2009)
  - Total: 2,410
  - Density: 88.6/km^{2} (229/sq mi)
- Time zone: UTC+1 (CET)
  - Summer (DST): UTC+2 (CEST)
- Postal code: 33030
- Dialing code: 0432
- Website: Official website

Dignano (Friulian: Dignan) is a comune (municipality) in the Regional decentralization entity of Udine in the Italian region of Friuli-Venezia Giulia, located about 80 kilometres (50 mi) northwest of Trieste and about 25 kilometres (16 mi) west of Udine.

Dignano borders the following municipalities: Coseano, Flaibano, Rive d'Arcano, San Daniele del Friuli, San Giorgio della Richinvelda, Spilimbergo.
