= Clauzetto =

Clauzetto Clausiet (Friulian)
- Comune
- Comune di Clauzetto
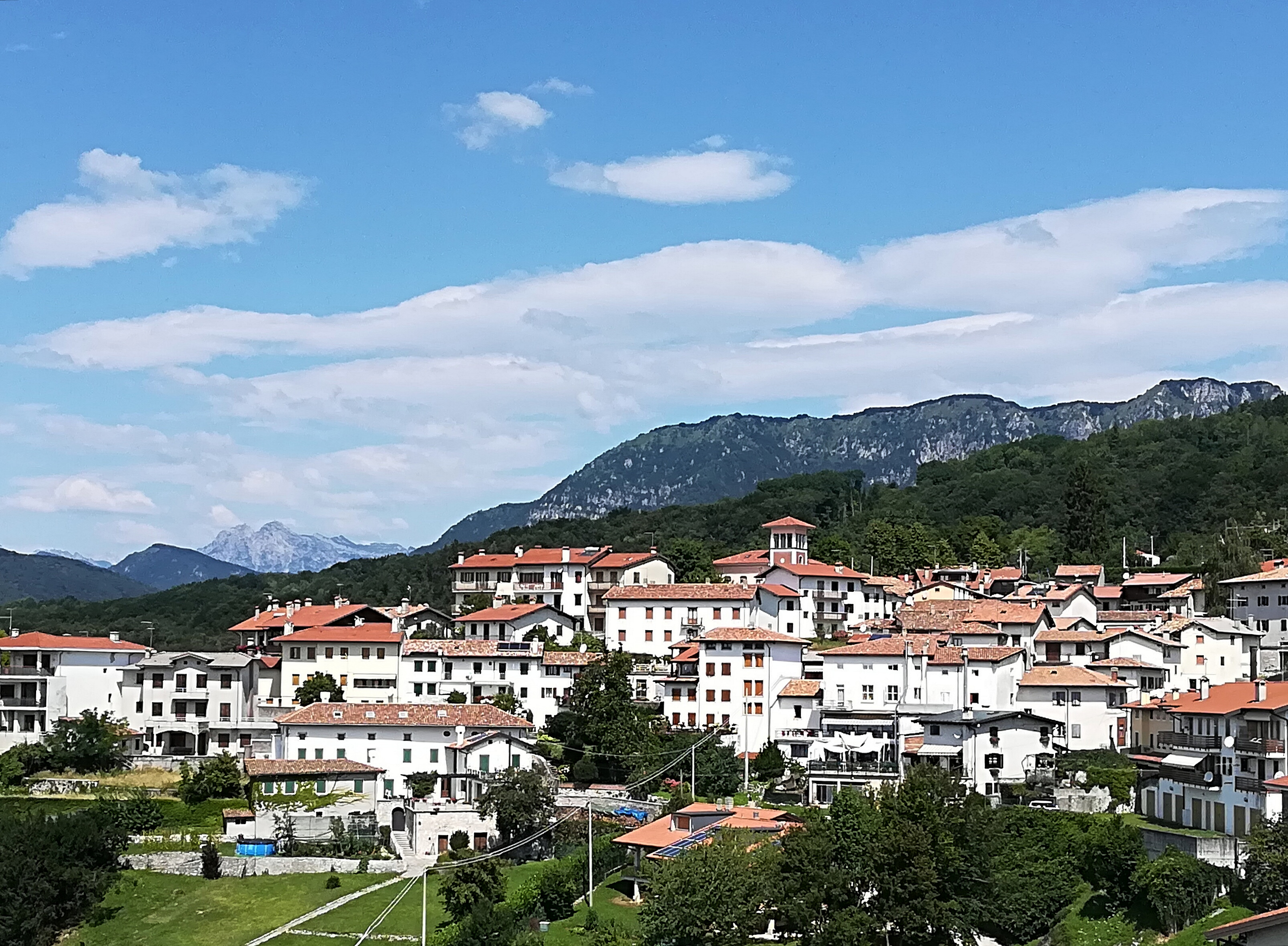

- Coat of arms

- Location within Italy Location within Friuli-Venezia Giulia
- Coordinates: 46°14′N 12°55′E
- Country: Italy
- Region: Friuli-Venezia Giulia
- Province: Pordenone (PN)

Government
  - Mayor: Flavio Del Missier

Area
  - Total: 27.9 km^{2} (10.8 sq mi)
- Elevation: 454 m (1,490 ft)

Population (30 June 2017)
  - Total: 377
  - Density: 13.5/km^{2} (35.0/sq mi)
- Demonym: Clauzettani
- Time zone: UTC+1 (CET)
  - Summer (DST): UTC+2 (CEST)
- Postal code: 33090
- Dialing code: 0427
- Website: Official website

Clauzetto (standard Friulian: Clausêt; Western Friulian: Clausiet) is a comune (municipality) in the Regional decentralization entity of Pordenone, in the Italian region of Friuli-Venezia Giulia, located about 100 kilometres (62 mi) northwest of Trieste and about 35 kilometres (22 mi) northeast of Pordenone.

Clauzetto borders the following municipalities: Castelnovo del Friuli, Pinzano al Tagliamento, Tramonti di Sotto, Vito d'Asio.

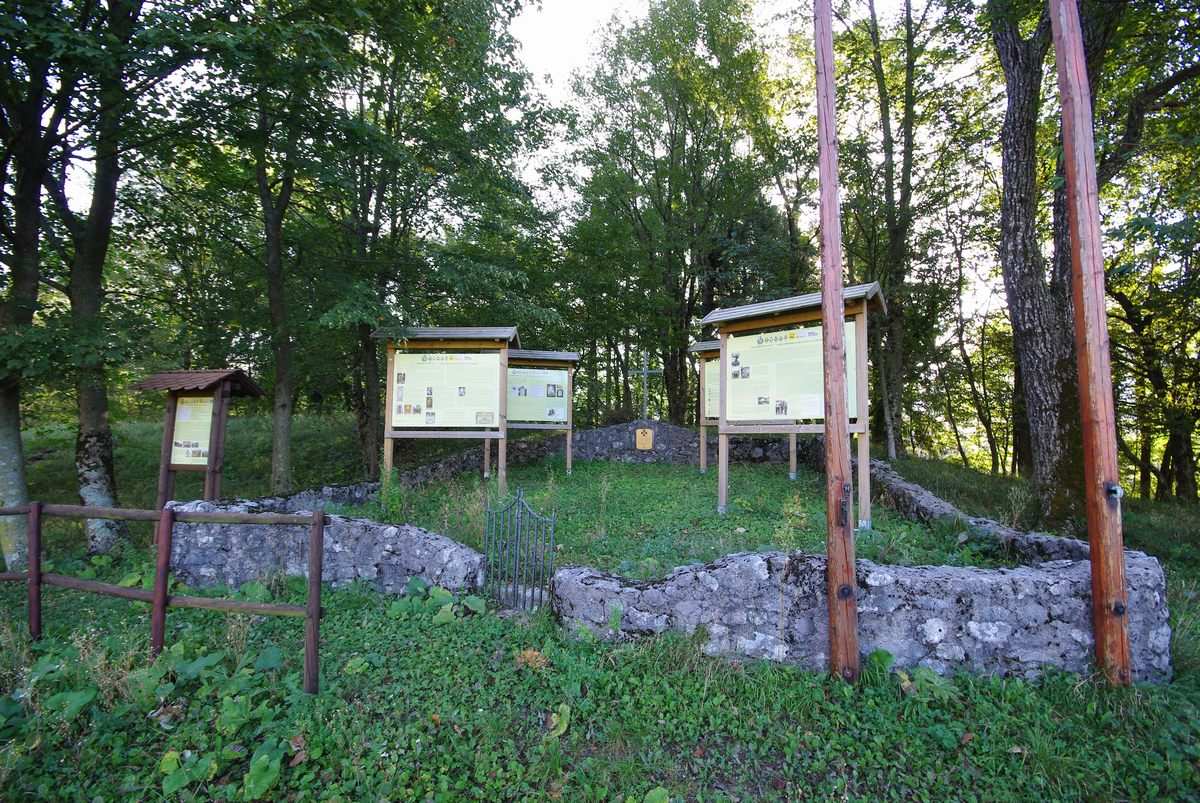
German war graves in Vito d'Asio

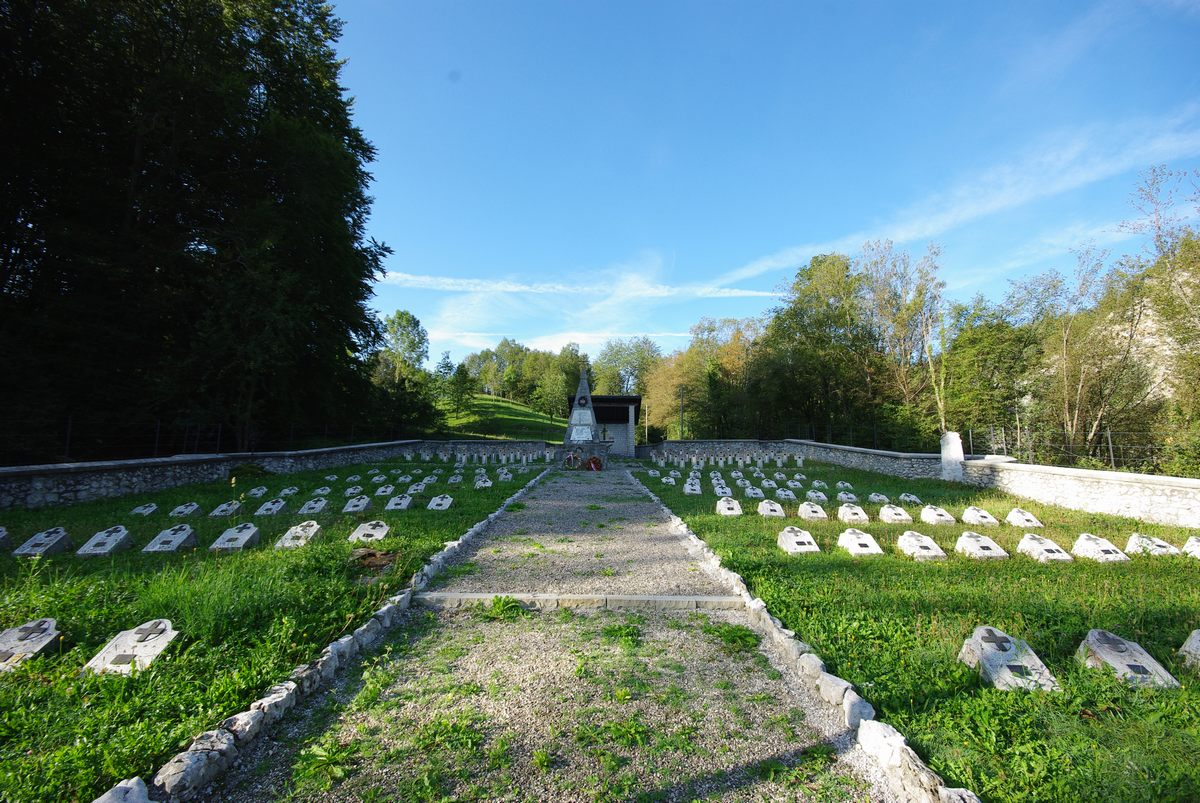
War graves of the Battle of Pradis
