= Santo Stino di Livenza railway station =

Railway station in San Stino di Livenza, Italy

Santo Stino di Livenza
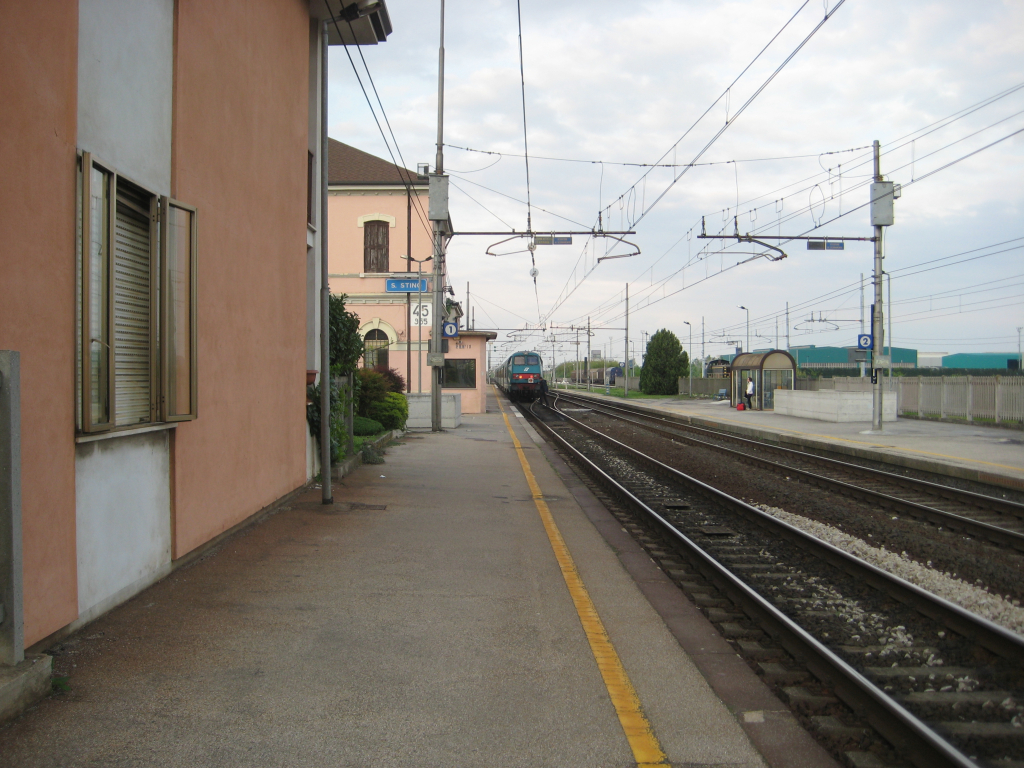
- Santo Stino di Livenza railway station

General information
- Location: Viale Stazione 155/a, Santo Stino di Livenza, Veneto; Italy
- Coordinates: 45°43′16″N 12°40′58″E
- Owner: Rete Ferroviaria Italiana
- Operator: Trenitalia
- Line: Venice–Trieste railway
- Distance: 45.955 km (28.555 mi) from Venezia Mestre
- Platforms: 2
- Tracks: 2

Other information
- Classification: Silver

History
- Opened: 17 June 1886; 140 years ago
Location
- Location within Veneto Location within Northern Italy Location within Italy

Santo Stino di Livenza (Italian: Stazione di Santo Stino di Livenza) is a railway station serving the town of Santo Stino di Livenza, in the region of Veneto, northern Italy. The station opened on 17 June 1886 and is located on the Venice–Trieste railway. The train services are operated by Trenitalia.

== Train services ==
The station is served by the following service(s):

- Express services (Regionale Veloce) Venice - Portogruaro - Cervignano del Friuli - Trieste
- Express services ( Regionale Veloce ) Verona - Padua - Venice - Latisana
- Local services (Treno regionale) Venice - Portogruaro

== See also ==
- History of rail transport in Italy
- List of railway stations in Veneto
- Rail transport in Italy
- Railway stations in Italy
