= Aria di Festa =

Italian festival around prosciutto di San Daniele

Coordinates: 46°9′37″N 13°0′41″E

Aria di Festa is a sagra—a festival based around a local culinary item—that takes place in San Daniele del Friuli over a period of three days at the end of June each year. The speciality here is a dry-cured raw ham known as prosciutto di San Daniele. The event draws thousands of tourists every year from across the world, especially from nearby Austria and Slovenia.

Aria di Friuli-Venezia Giulia, the Prosciutto Festival, takes place from June 24 to 27, 2016. As an addition to the Festival, musician Bob Dylan will kick off his Italian tour on June 27, in San Daniele del Friuli at Zanussi Stadium.

== See also ==
- Cured meat
