= Flaibano =

Flaibano Filban (Friulian)
- Comune
- Comune di Flaibano
- Coat of arms

- Location within Italy Location within Friuli-Venezia Giulia
- Coordinates: 46°3′N 12°59′E
- Country: Italy
- Region: Friuli-Venezia Giulia
- Province: Udine (UD)
- Frazioni: S. Odorico al Tagliamento

Government
  - Mayor: Luca Picco

Area
  - Total: 17.2 km^{2} (6.6 sq mi)
- Elevation: 104 m (341 ft)

Population (30 September 2008)
  - Total: 1,193
  - Density: 69.4/km^{2} (180/sq mi)
- Demonym: Flaibanesi
- Time zone: UTC+1 (CET)
  - Summer (DST): UTC+2 (CEST)
- Postal code: 33030
- Dialing code: 0432
- Website: Official website

Flaibano (Friulian: Flaiban, locally Filban) is a comune (municipality) in the Regional decentralization entity of Udine in the Italian region of Friuli-Venezia Giulia, located about 80 kilometres (50 mi) northwest of Trieste and about 20 kilometres (12 mi) west of Udine.

Flaibano borders the following municipalities: Coseano, Dignano, San Giorgio della Richinvelda, Sedegliano, Spilimbergo.

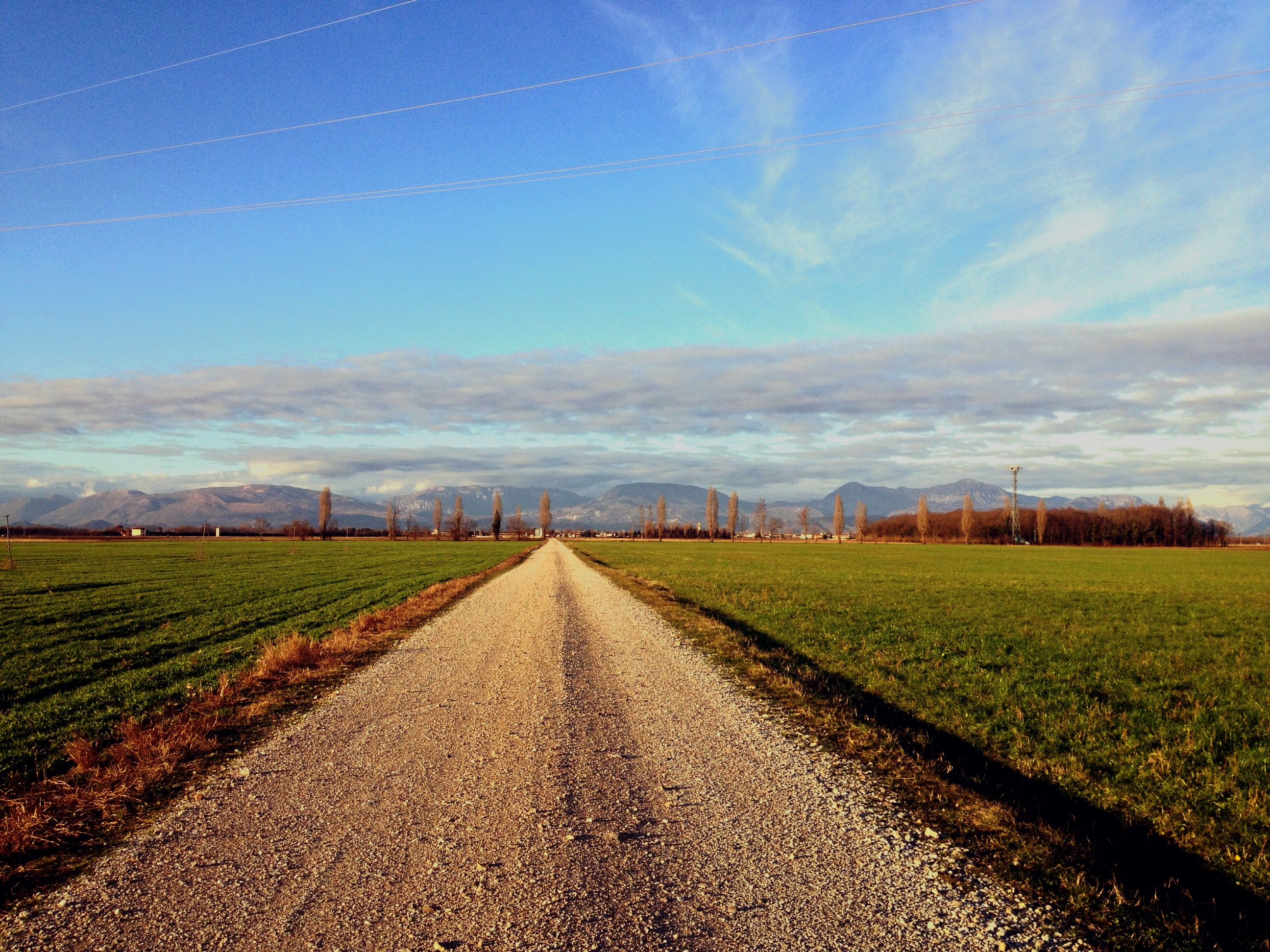
The surrounding countryside

== Twin towns ==
- Bettembourg, Luxembourg
- Valpaços, Portugal
