= Coseano =

Coseano Cosean (Friulian)
- Comune
- Comune di Coseano
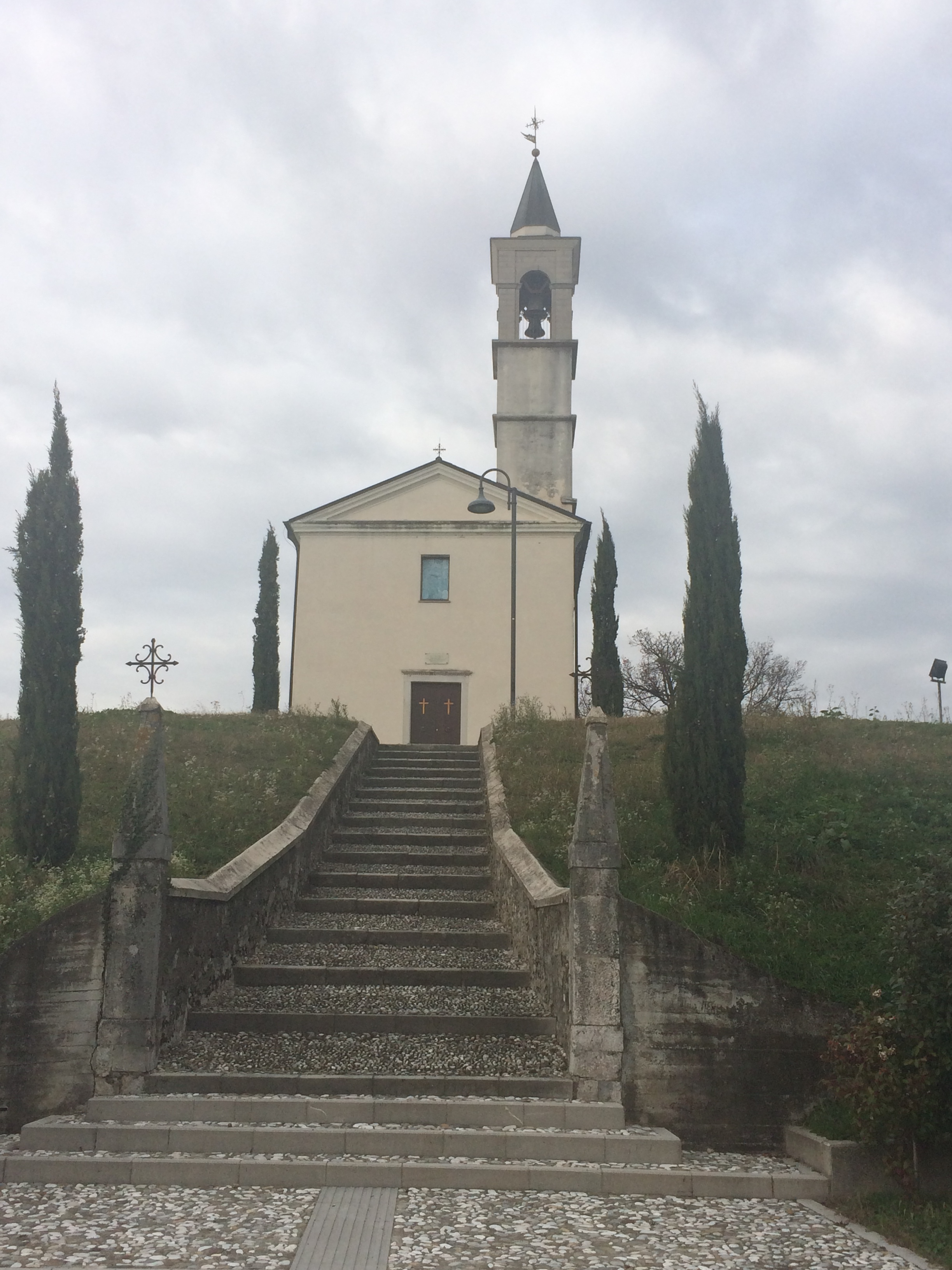

- Coat of arms

- Location within Italy Location within Friuli-Venezia Giulia
- Coordinates: 46°6′N 13°1′E
- Country: Italy
- Region: Friuli-Venezia Giulia
- Province: Udine (UD)
- Frazioni: Barazzetto, Cisterna, Coseanetto, Maseris, Nogaredo

Government
  - Mayor: Valerio Del Negro

Area
  - Total: 23.8 km^{2} (9.2 sq mi)
- Elevation: 121 m (397 ft)

Population (30 April 2017)
  - Total: 2,161
  - Density: 90.8/km^{2} (235/sq mi)
- Demonym: Coseanesi
- Time zone: UTC+1 (CET)
  - Summer (DST): UTC+2 (CEST)
- Postal code: 33030
- Dialing code: 0432
- Website: Official website

Coseano (Friulian: Cosean) is a comune (municipality) in the Regional decentralization entity of Udine in the Italian region of Friuli-Venezia Giulia, located about 80 kilometres (50 mi) northwest of Trieste and about 15 kilometres (9 mi) west of Udine.

Coseano borders the following municipalities: Dignano, Flaibano, Mereto di Tomba, Rive d'Arcano, San Vito di Fagagna, Sedegliano.

== Sports ==
A.S.D. G.S. Coseano is the local private football team, it's a private team whose president is businessman Stefano Di Bidino.

== Twin towns ==
- Finale Ligure, Italy
