= Fagagna =

Fagagna Feagne (Friulian)
- Comune
- Comune di Fagagna
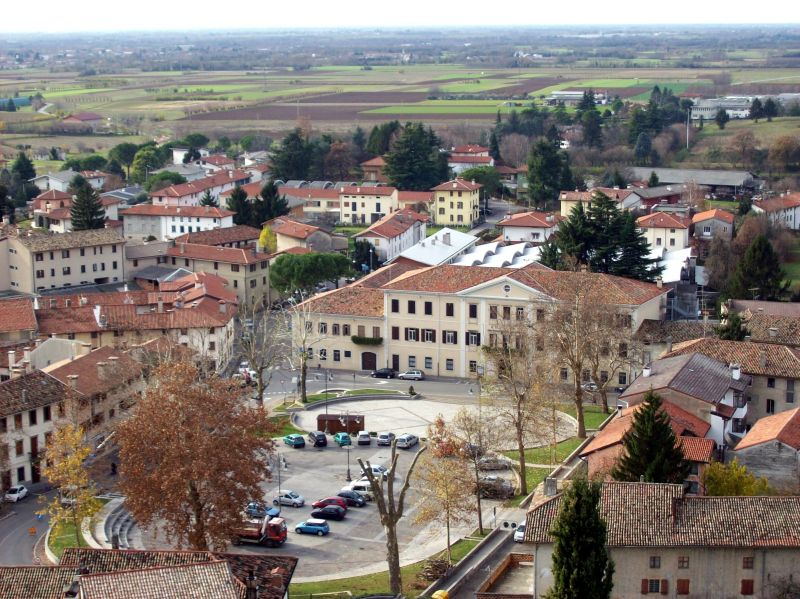
- Fagagna Square

- Flag Coat of arms

- Location within Italy Location within Friuli-Venezia Giulia
- Coordinates: 46°7′N 13°5′E
- Country: Italy
- Region: Friuli-Venezia Giulia
- Province: Udine (UD)
- Frazioni: Ciconicco, Villalta, San Giovanni in Colle, Battaglia, Madrisio

Area
  - Total: 37.0 km^{2} (14.3 sq mi)

Population (2011)
  - Total: 6,279
  - Density: 170/km^{2} (440/sq mi)
- Demonym: Fagagnesi o fagagnoti
- Time zone: UTC+1 (CET)
  - Summer (DST): UTC+2 (CEST)
- Postal code: 33034
- Dialing code: 0432
- Website: Official website

Fagagna (Friulian: Feagne) is a comune (municipality) in the Regional decentralization entity of Udine in the Italian region Friuli-Venezia Giulia, located about 80 kilometres (50 mi) northwest of Trieste and about 13 kilometres (8 mi) northwest of Udine. As of 2011, it had a population of 6,279 and an area of 37.0 square kilometres (14.3 mi^{2}). It is one of I Borghi più belli d'Italia ("The most beautiful villages of Italy").

The municipality of Fagagna contains the frazioni (boroughs) Ciconicco, Villalta, San Giovanni in Colle, Battaglia, and Madrisio. Fagagna borders the following municipalities: Basiliano, Colloredo di Monte Albano, Martignacco, Mereto di Tomba, Moruzzo, Rive d'Arcano, San Vito di Fagagna.

It is well known among nature-lovers for being the municipality which holds the nature reserve which bred the critically endangered Northern Bald Ibis or Waldrapp, from which 37 of the many individuals present were released in 2014 (under somewhat mysterious circumstances).

The local festival held every September includes two traditional events which attract tourists: the donkey race (since 1891), and the Palio dei Borghi, theatre performances given by the inhabitants of the four borghi, the districts of the town, on the main square.

== Demographic evolution ==
Historical population

Year	Pop.	±%
1861	?	—
1871	3,990	—
1881	4,378	+9.7%
1901	5,047	+15.3%
1911	5,955	+18.0%

Year	Pop.	±%
1921	6,462	+8.5%
1931	6,037	−6.6%
1936	5,343	−11.5%
1951	6,223	+16.5%
1961	5,761	−7.4%

Year	Pop.	±%
1971	5,253	−8.8%
1981	5,823	+10.9%
1991	5,949	+2.2%
2001	6,035	+1.4%
2011	6,279	+4.0%

Source: Data from ISTAT
