= Pinzano al Tagliamento =

Pinzano al Tagliamento Pinçan (Friulian)
- Comune
- Comune di Pinzano al Tagliamento
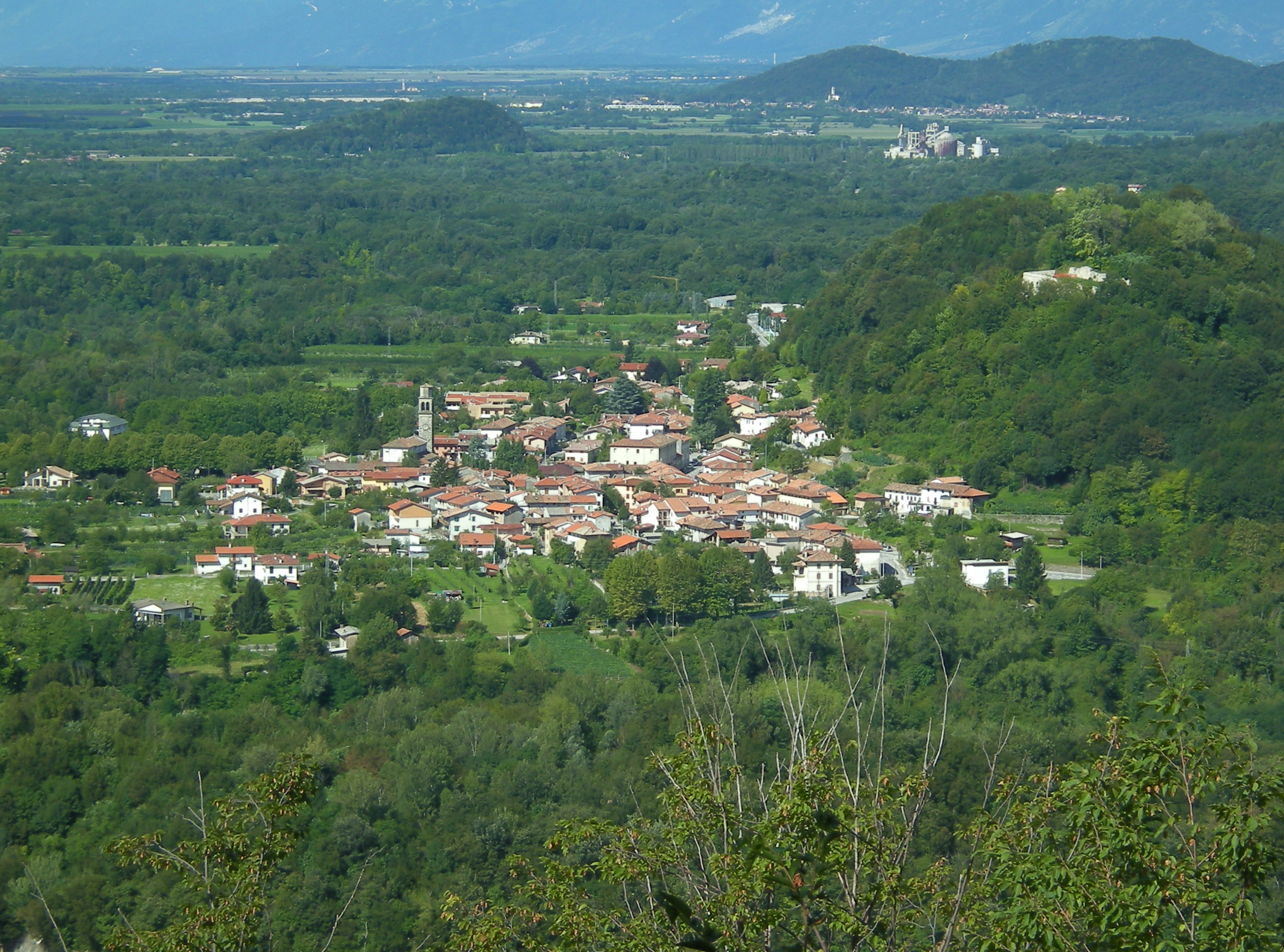

- Coat of arms

- Location within Italy Location within Friuli-Venezia Giulia
- Coordinates: 46°11′N 12°56′E
- Country: Italy
- Region: Friuli-Venezia Giulia
- Province: Pordenone (PN)
- Frazioni: Manazzons, Valeriano

Government
  - Mayor: Emiliano De Biasio

Area
  - Total: 21.8 km^{2} (8.4 sq mi)
- Elevation: 201 m (659 ft)

Population (31 December 2015)
  - Total: 1,526
  - Density: 70.0/km^{2} (181/sq mi)
- Demonym: Pinzanesi
- Time zone: UTC+1 (CET)
  - Summer (DST): UTC+2 (CEST)
- Postal code: 33094
- Dialing code: 0432
- Website: Official website

Pinzano al Tagliamento (Friulian: Pinçan) is a comune (municipality) in the Regional decentralization entity of Pordenone, in the Italian region of Friuli-Venezia Giulia, located about 90 kilometres (56 mi) northwest of Trieste and about 35 kilometres (22 mi) northeast of Pordenone.

Pinzano al Tagliamento borders the following municipalities: Castelnovo del Friuli, Clauzetto, Forgaria nel Friuli, Ragogna, San Daniele del Friuli, Sequals, Spilimbergo, Travesio, Vito d'Asio.
