= San Vito di Fagagna =

San Vito di Fagagna San Vît di Feagne (Friulian)
- Comune
- Comune di San Vito di Fagagna
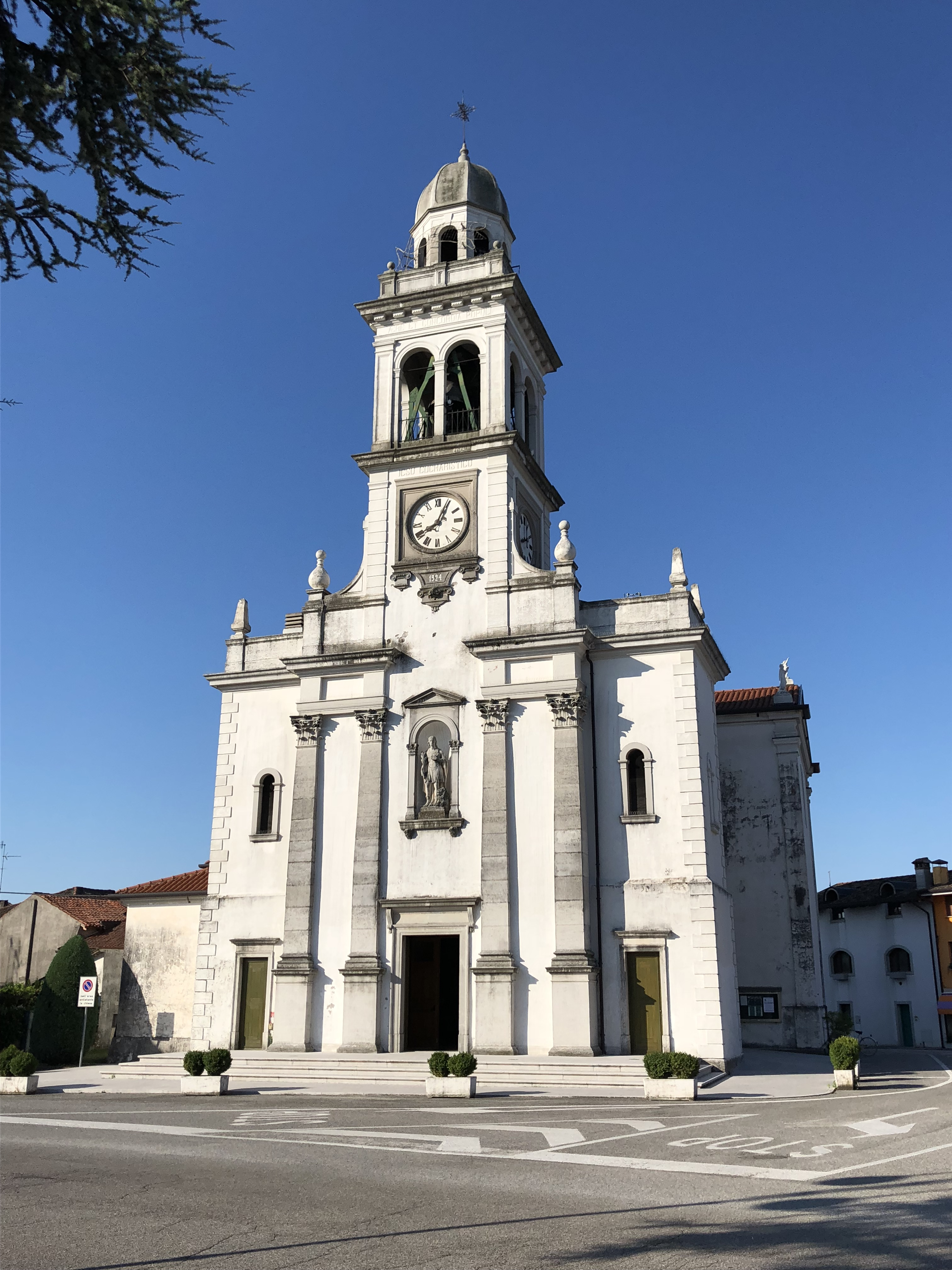

- Location within Italy Location within Friuli-Venezia Giulia
- Coordinates: 46°5′N 13°4′E
- Country: Italy
- Region: Friuli-Venezia Giulia
- Province: Udine (UD)

Government
  - Mayor: Michele Fabbro

Area
  - Total: 8.57 km^{2} (3.31 sq mi)
- Elevation: 135 m (443 ft)

Population (31 December 2015)
  - Total: 1,671
  - Density: 195/km^{2} (505/sq mi)
- Demonym: Sanvitesi
- Time zone: UTC+1 (CET)
  - Summer (DST): UTC+2 (CEST)
- Postal code: 33030
- Dialing code: 0432
- Website: Official website

San Vito di Fagagna (Friulian: San Vît di Feagne) is a comune (municipality) in the Regional decentralization entity of Udine in the Italian region of Friuli-Venezia Giulia, located about 80 kilometres (50 mi) northwest of Trieste and about 13 kilometres (8 mi) west of Udine.

San Vito di Fagagna borders the following municipalities: Coseano, Fagagna, Mereto di Tomba, Rive d'Arcano.
