= Castelnovo del Friuli =

Castelnovo del Friuli Cjastelnouf (Friulian)
- Comune
- Comune di Castelnovo del Friuli
- Location within Italy Location within Friuli-Venezia Giulia
- Coordinates: 46°12′N 12°54′E
- Country: Italy
- Region: Friuli-Venezia Giulia
- Province: Pordenone (PN)

Government
  - Mayor: Juri Del Toso

Area
  - Total: 22.6 km^{2} (8.7 sq mi)
- Elevation: 234 m (768 ft)

Population (30 June 2017)
  - Total: 866
  - Density: 38.3/km^{2} (99.2/sq mi)
- Demonym: Castellani
- Time zone: UTC+1 (CET)
  - Summer (DST): UTC+2 (CEST)
- Postal code: 33091
- Dialing code: 0427

Castelnovo del Friuli (Friulian: Cjastelgnûf, Western Friulian: Cjastelnouf) is a comune (municipality) in the Regional decentralization entity of Pordenone, in the Italian region of Friuli-Venezia Giulia, located about 90 kilometres (56 mi) northwest of Trieste and about 30 kilometres (19 mi) northeast of Pordenone.

Castelnovo del Friuli borders the following municipalities: Clauzetto, Pinzano al Tagliamento, Tramonti di Sotto, Travesio, Vito d'Asio.
