= Furlan standard =

Furlan standard or Furlan normalizât, also known as coinè or lenghe comun, it is the lenghe scrite or the standard written language for the entire Friulian community. The main association to foster the use and development of Friulian is the Societât filologjiche furlane, founded in Gorizia in 1919.

== History ==
A challenge that Friulians share with other minorities is to create a standard language and a unique writing system. The regional law 15/1996 approved a standard orthography, which represents the basis of a common variant and should be used in toponyms, official acts, written documents. These standards are primarily based on Central Friulian, the language already used traditionally in literature since 1700 onwards (the best examples are probably Pieri Çorut's works), but with some changes:

- the diphthong ie replaces ia, e.g. fier (iron) instead of fiar or tiere (soil, Earth) instead of tiare;
- the use of vu instead of u at the beginning of word, for example—

vueli (oil) instead of ueli ; or vueit (empty) instead of ueit;

- the use of i between vocals, for example ploie (rain) instead of ploe.

== Current status ==
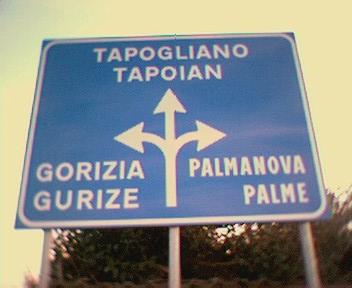
Road sign in Italian and Friulian

Friulian has been officially recognized in Italy, supported by law 482/1999 protecting linguistic minorities. Therefore, teaching of Friulian has been introduced in many primary schools. An online newspaper is active, and there are also a number of musical groups which use Friulian for their songs as well as some theatrical companies. Recently two movies have been made in Friulian (Tierç lion, Lidrîs cuadrade di trê), with positive reviews in Italian newspapers. There is also an official translation of the Bible. In 2005, a notable brand of beer used Friulian for one of its commercials.

In about 40% of the communities in the Province of Udine, road signs are in both Friulian and Italian. Every city and village in Friuli has two names, one in Italian and one in Friulian. Only the Italian is official and used in administration, although it is widely expected that the Friulian ones will receive partial acknowledgement in the near future. For example, the city of Udine is called Udin in Friulian, the town of Tolmezzo is called Tumieç, the town of Aviano is called both Avian and Pleif.
