= Rive d'Arcano =

Rive d'Arcano Rives Darcjan (Friulian)
- Comune
- Comune di Rive d'Arcano
- Location within Italy Location within Friuli-Venezia Giulia
- Coordinates: 46°8′N 13°2′E
- Country: Italy
- Region: Friuli-Venezia Giulia
- Province: Udine (UD)

Area
  - Total: 22.5 km^{2} (8.7 sq mi)

Population (Dec. 2004)
  - Total: 2,363
  - Density: 105/km^{2} (272/sq mi)
- Time zone: UTC+1 (CET)
  - Summer (DST): UTC+2 (CEST)
- Postal code: 33030
- Dialing code: 0432

Rive d'Arcano (Friulian: Rives Darcjan) is a comune (municipality) in the Regional decentralization entity of Udine in the Italian region of Friuli-Venezia Giulia, located about 80 kilometres (50 mi) northwest of Trieste and about 15 kilometres (9 mi) northwest of Udine. As of 31 December 2004, it had a population of 2,363 and an area of 22.5 square kilometres (8.7 mi^{2}).

Rive d'Arcano borders the following municipalities: Colloredo di Monte Albano, Coseano, Dignano, Fagagna, Majano, San Daniele del Friuli, San Vito di Fagagna.

== Demographic evolution ==
Historical population

Year	Pop.	±%
1861	?	—
1871	1,895	—
1881	2,092	+10.4%
1901	2,671	+27.7%
1911	3,339	+25.0%

Year	Pop.	±%
1921	3,831	+14.7%
1931	3,465	−9.6%
1936	2,771	−20.0%
1951	3,014	+8.8%
1961	2,781	−7.7%

Year	Pop.	±%
1971	2,527	−9.1%
1981	2,443	−3.3%
1991	2,338	−4.3%
2001	2,284	−2.3%

Source: Data from ISTAT
