= San Stino di Livenza =

- Comune
- Comune di San Stino di Livenza
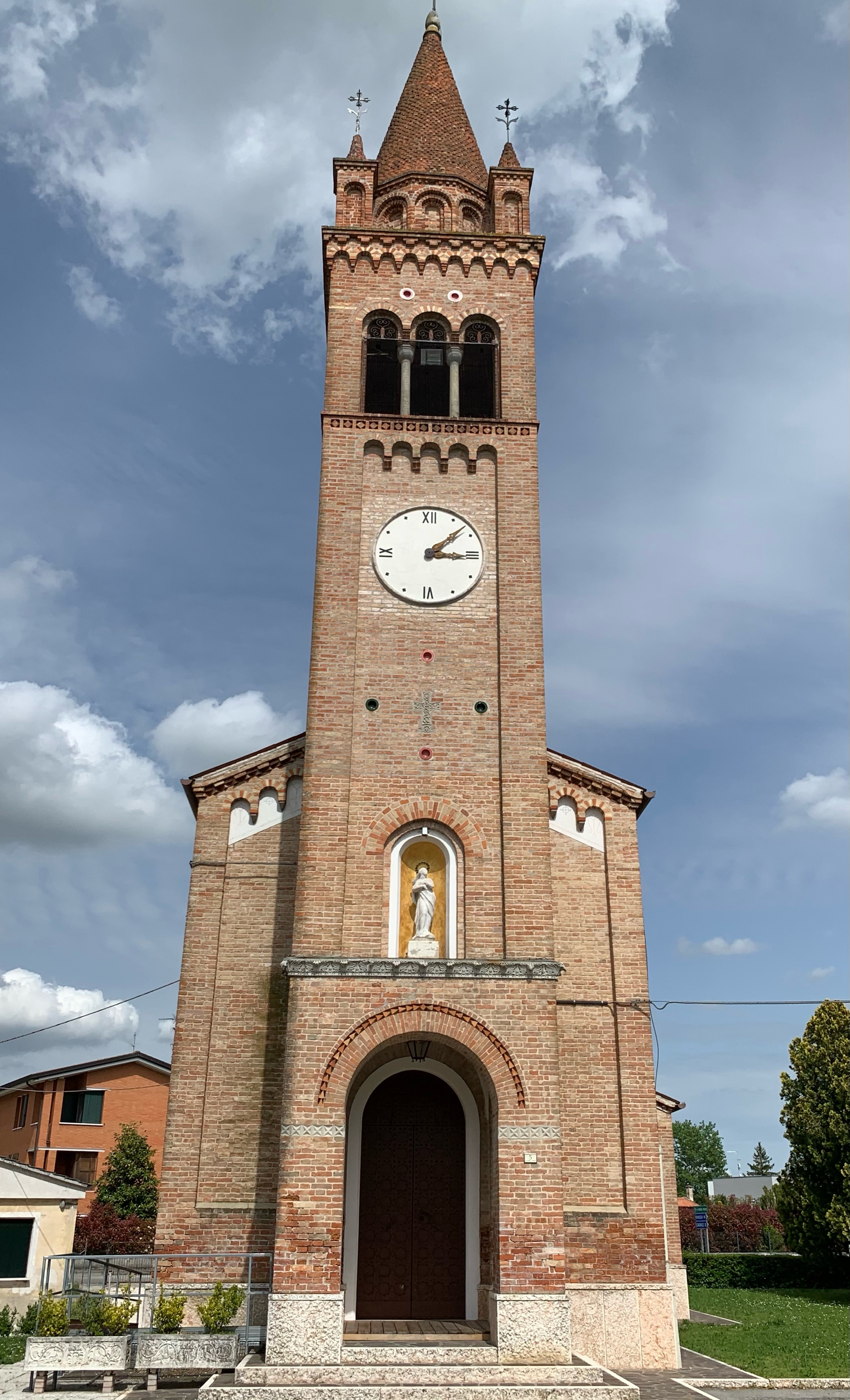
- Church of the Rosary, San Stino di Livenza

- Location within Italy Location within Veneto
- Coordinates: 45°44′N 12°41′E
- Country: Italy
- Region: Veneto
- Metropolitan city: Venice (VE)
- Frazioni: Biverone, Corbolone, La Salute di Livenza

Government
  - Mayor: Matteo Cappelletto

Area
  - Total: 68.09 km^{2} (26.29 sq mi)
- Elevation: 6 m (20 ft)

Population (2011)
  - Total: 13,144
  - Density: 193.0/km^{2} (500.0/sq mi)
- Demonym: Sanstinesi
- Time zone: UTC+1 (CET)
  - Summer (DST): UTC+2 (CEST)
- Postal code: 30029, 30020
- Dialing code: 0421
- Website: Official website

San Stino di Livenza (Venetian: San Stin) is a town in the Metropolitan City of Venice, Veneto, northern Italy. It is connected by the SP61 provincial road and by the motorway A4. The main square (piazza) is the Piazza Aldo Moro.

== Geography ==
The town lies between the Livenza river and the Malgher canal.

== Transportation ==
- Santo Stino di Livenza railway station

== Notable people ==
- Luisa Mattioli (1936–2021), actress

== Sources ==
- (Google Maps)
