= Martignacco =

Martignacco Martignà (Friulian)
- Comune
- Comune di Martignacco
- Coat of arms

- Location within Italy Location within Friuli-Venezia Giulia
- Coordinates: 46°6′N 13°8′E
- Country: Italy
- Region: Friuli-Venezia Giulia
- Province: Udine (UD)
- Frazioni: Casanova, Ceresetto, Faugnacco, Nogaredo di Prato, Torreano

Government
  - Mayor: Marco Zanor (Lega Nord)

Area
  - Total: 26.7 km^{2} (10.3 sq mi)
- Elevation: 148 m (486 ft)

Population (2010)
  - Total: 6,377
  - Density: 239/km^{2} (619/sq mi)
- Time zone: UTC+1 (CET)
  - Summer (DST): UTC+2 (CEST)
- Postal code: 33035
- Dialing code: 0432
- Website: Official website

Martignacco (Friulian: Martignà) is a comune (municipality) in the Regional decentralization entity of Udine in the Italian region of Friuli-Venezia Giulia, located about 70 kilometres (43 mi) northwest of Trieste and about 9 kilometres (6 mi) northwest of Udine.

Martignacco borders the following municipalities: Basiliano, Fagagna, Moruzzo, Pagnacco, Pasian di Prato, Tavagnacco.
