= Basiliano =

Municipality in Friuli-Venezia Giulia, Italy

Basiliano Basilian (Friulian)
- Comune
- Comune di Basiliano
- Coat of arms

- Location within Italy Location within Friuli-Venezia Giulia
- Coordinates: 46°1′N 13°6′E
- Country: Italy
- Region: Friuli-Venezia Giulia
- Province: Udine (UD)
- Frazioni: Basagliapenta, Blessano, Orgnano, Variano, Villaorba, Vissandone

Government
  - Mayor: Marco Olivo (Fratelli d'Italia -Lega coalition)

Area
  - Total: 42.9 km^{2} (16.6 sq mi)
- Elevation: 77 m (253 ft)

Population (31 August 2025)
  - Total: 5,146
  - Density: 120/km^{2} (311/sq mi)
- Demonym: Basilianesi
- Time zone: UTC+1 (CET)
  - Summer (DST): UTC+2 (CEST)
- Postal code: 33031
- Dialing code: 0432
- Website: Official website

Basiliano (Friulian: Basilian; known until 1923 as Pasian Schiavonesco or Pasian Sclavonesc) is a comune (municipality) in the Regional decentralization entity of Udine in the Italian region of Friuli-Venezia Giulia, located about 70 kilometres (43 mi) northwest of Trieste and about 12 kilometres (7 mi) southwest of Udine.

Basiliano borders the following municipalities: Campoformido, Codroipo, Fagagna, Lestizza, Martignacco, Mereto di Tomba, Pasian di Prato, Pozzuolo del Friuli.

== Physical geography ==
The municipality is located in the Middle Friuli region, on the high Friulian plain, at an average altitude of 77 meters above sea level, and is approximately 13 km from both Udine and Codroipo.

== Society ==
=== Demographic evolution ===
Historical population

Year	Pop.	±%
1861	?	—
1871	3,864	—
1881	4,133	+7.0%
1901	4,998	+20.9%
1911	6,092	+21.9%
1921	6,505	+6.8%

Year	Pop.	±%
1931	5,969	−8.2%
1936	5,723	−4.1%
1951	6,092	+6.4%
1961	5,621	−7.7%
1971	5,267	−6.3%
1981	5,171	−1.8%

Year	Pop.	±%
1991	5,007	−3.2%
2001	4,894	−2.3%
2011	5,353	+9.4%
2021	5,233	−2.2%

Source: Data from ISTAT

=== Foreign ethnicities and minorities ===
As of December 31, 2024 foreigners residents in the municipality were 393, i.e. 7.3% of the population. The largest foreign community is that from Albania with 25.9% of all foreigners present in the country, followed by Romania and Tunisia.

== Notable people ==
- Omero Antonutti actor originally from the hamlet of Blessano.
- Ricciotti Greatti former footballer who played as a midfielder
