= Bertiolo =

Bertiolo Bertiûl (Friulian)
- Comune
- Comune di Bertiolo
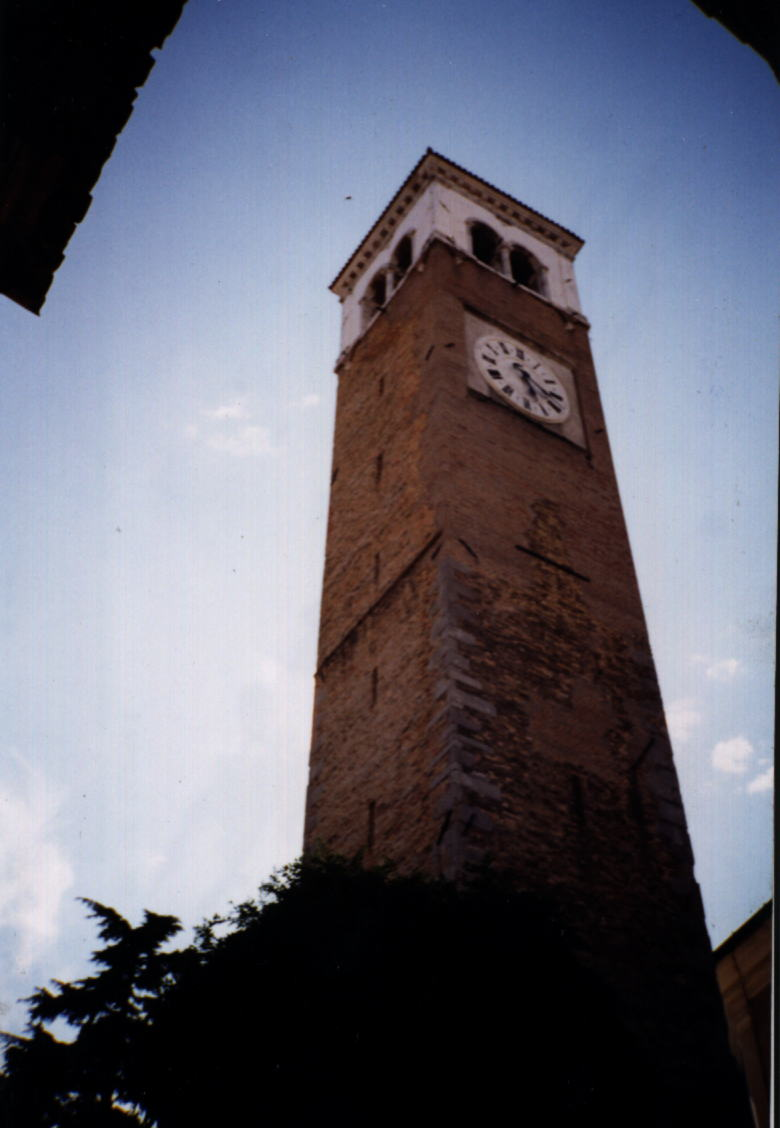
- Bell tower of the church of St. Martino Vescovo.

- Coat of arms

- Location within Italy Location within Friuli-Venezia Giulia
- Coordinates: 45°56′N 13°3′E
- Country: Italy
- Region: Friuli-Venezia Giulia
- Province: Udine (UD)
- Frazioni: Virco, Pozzecco, Sterpo

Government
  - Mayor: Eleonora Viscardis

Area
  - Total: 26.07 km^{2} (10.07 sq mi)
- Elevation: 33 m (108 ft)

Population (30 April 2017)
  - Total: 2,446
  - Density: 93.82/km^{2} (243.0/sq mi)
- Demonym(s): it. bertiolesi, fur. bertiulins
- Time zone: UTC+1 (CET)
  - Summer (DST): UTC+2 (CEST)
- Postal code: 33032
- Dialing code: 0432
- Website: Official website

Bertiolo (Friulian: Bertiûl) is a comune (municipality) in the Regional decentralization entity of Udine in the Italian region of Friuli-Venezia Giulia. Bertiolo is located about 70 kilometres (43 mi) northwest of Trieste and about 20 kilometres (12 mi) southwest of Udine.

Bertiolo borders the municipalities Codroipo, Lestizza, Rivignano Teor, Talmassons, and Varmo.
