= Lestizza =

Lestizza Listisse (Friulian)
- Comune
- Comune di Lestizza
- Location within Italy Location within Friuli-Venezia Giulia
- Coordinates: 45°57′N 13°8′E
- Country: Italy
- Region: Friuli-Venezia Giulia
- Province: Udine (UD)
- Frazioni: Galleriano, Nespoledo, Santa Maria, Sclaunicco, Villa Caccia

Government
  - Mayor: Geremia Gomboso

Area
  - Total: 34.2 km^{2} (13.2 sq mi)
- Elevation: 24 m (79 ft)

Population (30 April 2017)
  - Total: 3,755
  - Density: 110/km^{2} (284/sq mi)
- Demonym: Lestizzesi
- Time zone: UTC+1 (CET)
  - Summer (DST): UTC+2 (CEST)
- Postal code: 33050
- Dialing code: 0432
- Website: Official website

Lestizza (Friulian: Listize, locally Listisse) is a comune (municipality) in the Regional decentralization entity of Udine in the Italian region of Friuli-Venezia Giulia, located about 60 kilometres (37 mi) northwest of Trieste and about 15 kilometres (9 mi) southwest of Udine.

Lestizza borders the following municipalities: Basiliano, Bertiolo, Codroipo, Mortegliano, Pozzuolo del Friuli, Talmassons.
