= Mereto di Tomba =

Mereto di Tomba Merêt di Tombe (Friulian)
- Comune
- Comune di Mereto di Tomba
- Coat of arms

- Location within Italy Location within Friuli-Venezia Giulia
- Coordinates: 46°3′N 13°2′E
- Country: Italy
- Region: Friuli-Venezia Giulia
- Province: Udine (UD)
- Frazioni: Pantianicco, Plasencis, Tomba, San Marco, Savalons

Government
  - Mayor: Claudio Violino

Area
  - Total: 27.40 km^{2} (10.58 sq mi)
- Elevation: 98 m (322 ft)

Population (30 April 2017)
  - Total: 2,734
  - Density: 99.78/km^{2} (258.4/sq mi)
- Demonym: Meretani
- Time zone: UTC+1 (CET)
  - Summer (DST): UTC+2 (CEST)
- Postal code: 33036
- Dialing code: 0432
- Website: Official website

Mereto di Tomba (Friulian: Merêt di Tombe) is a comune (municipality) in the Regional decentralization entity of Udine in the Italian region of Friuli-Venezia Giulia, located about 80 kilometres (50 mi) northwest of Trieste and about 15 kilometres (9 mi) west of Udine.

Mereto di Tomba borders the following municipalities: Basiliano, Codroipo, Coseano, Fagagna, San Vito di Fagagna, Sedegliano and Pasian di Prato.

== Twin towns ==
Mereto di Tomba is twinned with:

- Oppeano, Italy
