= Ragogna =

Ragogna Ruvigne (Friulian)
- Comune
- Comune di Ragogna
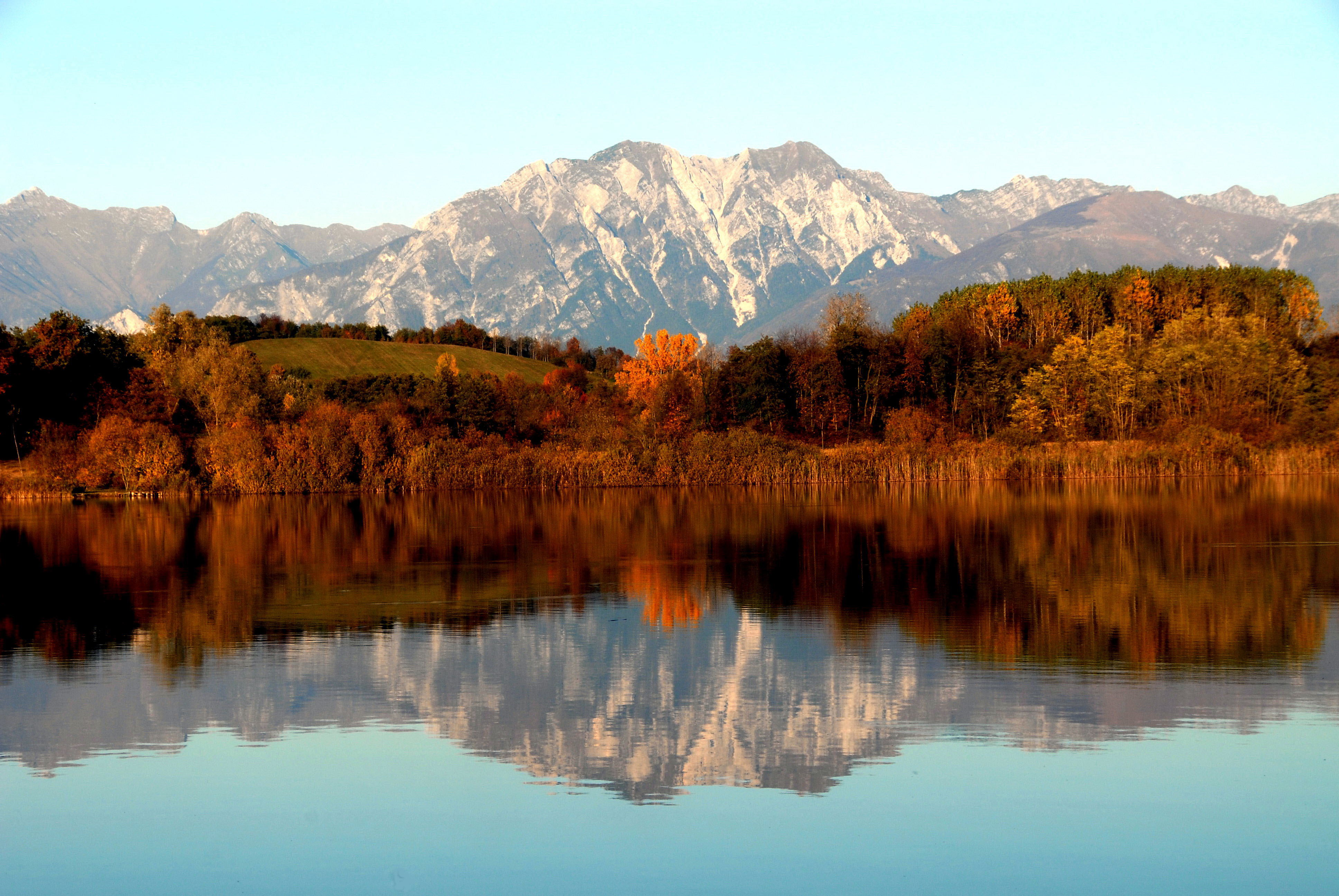
- Lake of Ragogna

- Location within Italy Location within Friuli-Venezia Giulia
- Coordinates: 46°11′N 12°59′E
- Country: Italy
- Region: Friuli-Venezia Giulia
- Province: Udine (UD)
- Frazioni: San Giacomo, San Pietro, Muris, Villuzza, Ca' Farra, Canodusso, and Pignano

Government
  - Mayor: Alma Concil

Area
  - Total: 22.03 km^{2} (8.51 sq mi)
- Elevation: 235 m (771 ft)

Population (31 December 2015)
  - Total: 2,909
  - Density: 132.0/km^{2} (342.0/sq mi)
- Demonym: Ragognesi
- Time zone: UTC+1 (CET)
  - Summer (DST): UTC+2 (CEST)
- Postal code: 33030
- Dialing code: 0432
- Patron saint: St. James
- Website: Official website

Ragogna (Friulian: Ruvigne) is a comune (municipality) in the Regional decentralization entity of Udine, in the Italian region of Friuli-Venezia Giulia, located about 90 kilometres (56 mi) northwest of Trieste and about 30 kilometres (19 mi) northwest of Udine.

Ragogna borders the following municipalities: Forgaria nel Friuli, Pinzano al Tagliamento, San Daniele del Friuli.

== Twin towns ==
Ragogna is twinned with:

- Weitensfeld im Gurktal, Austria, since 2003
- Sainte-Bazeille, France, since 2010
