= Majano =

Majano Maian (Friulian)
- Comune
- Comune di Majano
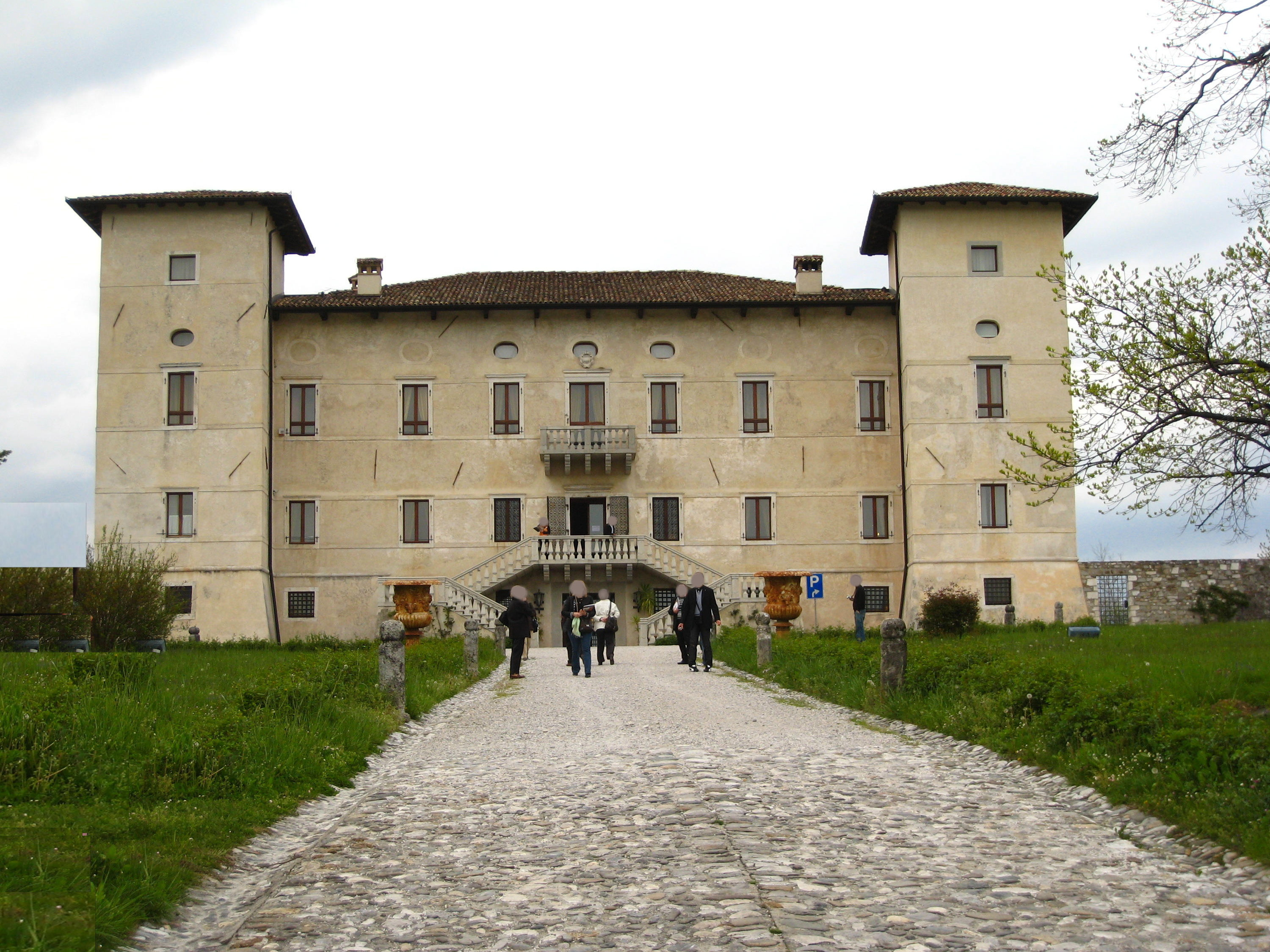
- Castle of Susans

- Coat of arms

- Location within Italy Location within Friuli-Venezia Giulia
- Coordinates: 46°11′N 13°4′E
- Country: Italy
- Region: Friuli-Venezia Giulia
- Province: Udine (UD)
- Frazioni: Casasola, Comerzo, Farla, Pers, S. Eliseo, S. Salvatore, S. Tomaso, Susans, Tiveriacco

Government
  - Mayor: Elisa De Sabbata (since 2021)

Area
  - Total: 28.1 km^{2} (10.8 sq mi)
- Elevation: 170 m (560 ft)

Population (30 April 2017)
  - Total: 5,953
  - Density: 212/km^{2} (549/sq mi)
- Demonym: Majanesi
- Time zone: UTC+1 (CET)
  - Summer (DST): UTC+2 (CEST)
- Postal code: 33030
- Dialing code: 0432
- Patron saint: Sts. Peter and Paul
- Saint day: June 29
- Website: Official website

Majano (Friulian: Maian) is a comune (municipality) in the Regional decentralization entity of Udine in the Italian region of Friuli-Venezia Giulia, located about 80 kilometres (50 mi) northwest of Trieste and about 20 kilometres (12 mi) northwest of Udine.

Majano borders the following municipalities: Buja, Colloredo di Monte Albano, Forgaria nel Friuli, Osoppo, Rive d'Arcano, San Daniele del Friuli.

== Twin towns ==
- San Zenone degli Ezzelini, Italy, since 2000
- Traversetolo, Italy
