= San Daniele del Friuli =

San Daniele del Friuli Sant Denêl (Friulian)
- Comune
- Città di San Daniele del Friuli
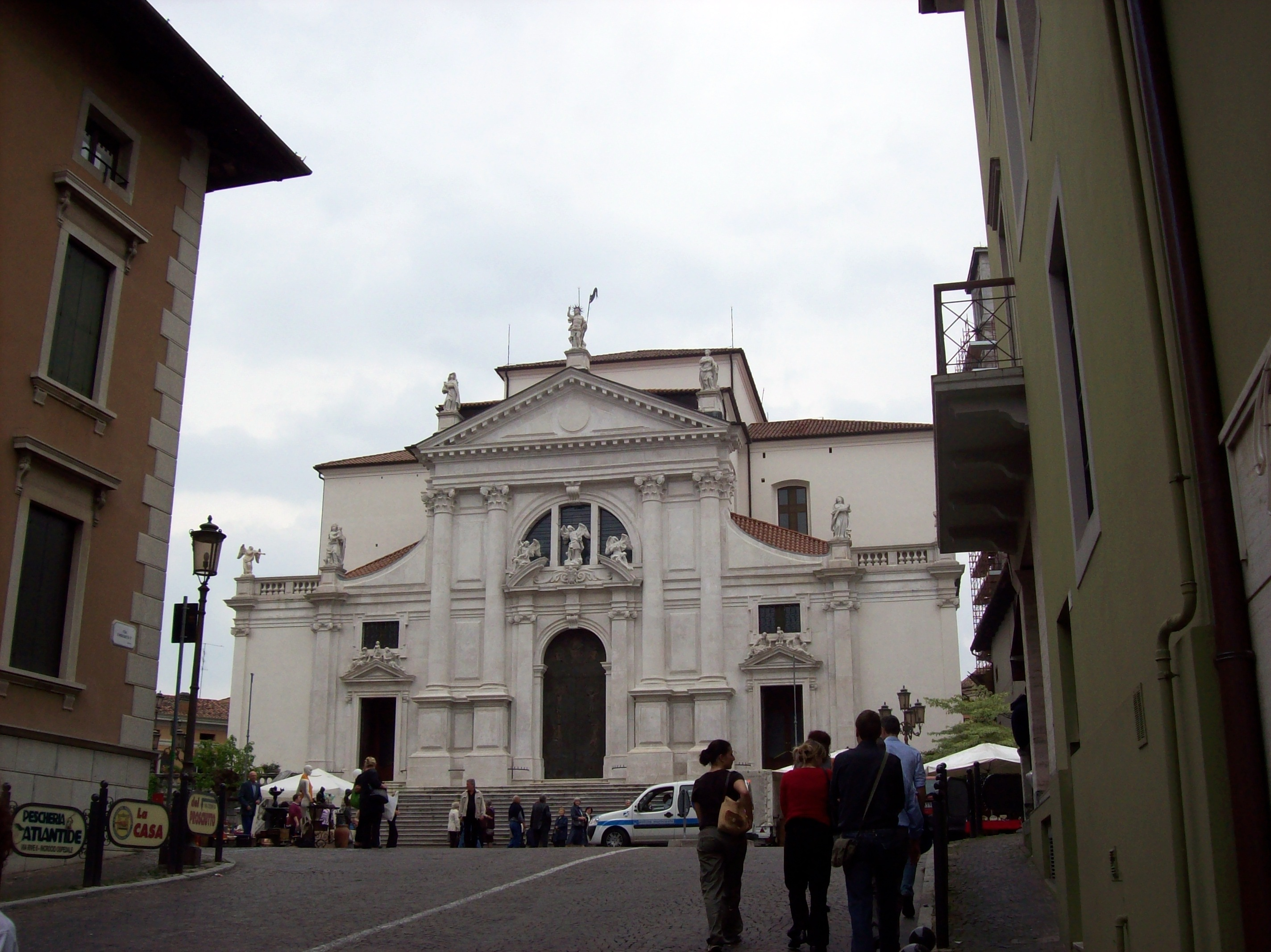
- Cathedral of San Michele Arcangelo

- Coat of arms

- Location within Italy Location within Friuli-Venezia Giulia
- Coordinates: 46°9′N 13°1′E
- Country: Italy
- Region: Friuli-Venezia Giulia
- Province: Udine (UD)
- Frazioni: Villanova, Cimano, Aonedis, Soprapaludo

Government
  - Mayor: Pietro Valent (since 30/04/2018)

Area
  - Total: 34.7 km^{2} (13.4 sq mi)
- Elevation: 252 m (827 ft)

Population (31 December 2007)
  - Total: 8,084
  - Density: 233/km^{2} (603/sq mi)
- Demonym: Sandanielesi
- Time zone: UTC+1 (CET)
  - Summer (DST): UTC+2 (CEST)
- Postal code: 33038
- Dialing code: 0432
- Patron saint: St. Michael Archangel and St. Daniel the Prophet
- Saint day: August 28
- Website: Official website

San Daniele del Friuli (Friulian: Sant Denêl) is a comune (municipality) in the province of Udine, in the Italian region of Friuli-Venezia Giulia, located about 80 kilometres (50 mi) northwest of Trieste and about 20 kilometres (12 mi) northwest of Udine.

San Daniele del Friuli borders these municipalities: Dignano, Forgaria nel Friuli, Majano, Osoppo, Pinzano al Tagliamento, Ragogna, Rive d'Arcano, and Spilimbergo.

San Daniele is best known as the production center of the eponymous prosciutto. The product is celebrated every summer at the end of June during the Aria di Festa.

== Main sights ==
- Biblioteca Guarneriana, an old public library, founded in 1466 by Guarnerio d'Artegna, which includes a rare edition of Dante's Inferno from the 14th century
- Cathedral of San Michele Arcangelo
- Church of Sant'Antonio Abate, housing a precious frescoed chapel known as the "Sistine Chapel of Friuli"
- Porta Gemona, designed in 1579 by Andrea Palladio in a tower which is a relic of the old medieval castle

== Culture ==
=== Sports ===
San Daniele is home to a semi-professional football team, A.S.D. San Daniele Calcio, which currently plays in the Prima Categoria level of Italian football. The Team plays its home matches at the Lino Zanussi Stadium.

Coppa Città di San Daniele is an annual cycling race that starts and finishes in the city.

== International relations ==
=== Twin towns — sister cities ===
San Daniele del Friuli is twinned with:

- Altkirch, France, since 1985
- Millstatt, Austria, since 1994
- Hersbruck, Germany, since 2008
