= San Giorgio della Richinvelda =

San Giorgio della Richinvelda San 'Sors (Friulian)
- Comune
- Comune di San Giorgio della Richinvelda
- Coat of arms

- Location within Italy Location within Friuli-Venezia Giulia
- Coordinates: 46°3′N 12°52′E
- Country: Italy
- Region: Friuli-Venezia Giulia
- Province: Pordenone (PN)
- Frazioni: Aurava, Cosa, Domanins, Pozzo, Provesano, Rauscedo

Government
  - Mayor: Michele Leon

Area
  - Total: 47.9 km^{2} (18.5 sq mi)
- Elevation: 86 m (282 ft)

Population (ISTAT 2014)
  - Total: 4,626
  - Density: 96.6/km^{2} (250/sq mi)
- Demonym: Sangiorgini
- Time zone: UTC+1 (CET)
  - Summer (DST): UTC+2 (CEST)
- Postal code: 33095
- Dialing code: 0427
- Website: Official website

San Giorgio della Richinvelda (Standard Friulian: San Zorç da la Richinvelde, Western Friulian: San 'Sors) is a comune (municipality) in the Regional decentralization entity of Pordenone in the Italian region of Friuli-Venezia Giulia, located about 90 kilometres (56 mi) northwest of Trieste and about 20 kilometres (12 mi) northeast of Pordenone. It has a population of 4,626 inhabitants.

The seven frazioni (boroughs) that compose the municipality are Rauscedo, Domanins, Cosa, Pozzo, Provesano, Aurava and San Giorgio. Agriculture represents the most common activity of the territory.

== Notable people ==
- Donato Casella, renaissance sculptor from Carona
- Pim Fortuyn, Dutch politician, sociologist, author and professor, assassinated during the Dutch general election of 2002, owned a holiday home in the town and is buried in the cemetery of the frazione Provesano.
- Gino Pancino, cyclist
- Tarcisio Petracco
- Bertram of St. Genesius, Patriarch of Aquileia, assassinated during an ambush at San Giorgio della Richinvelda on 6 June 1350.
