= Valvasone Arzene =

Valvasone Arzene Voleson Darzin (Friulian)
- Comune
- Comune di Valvasone
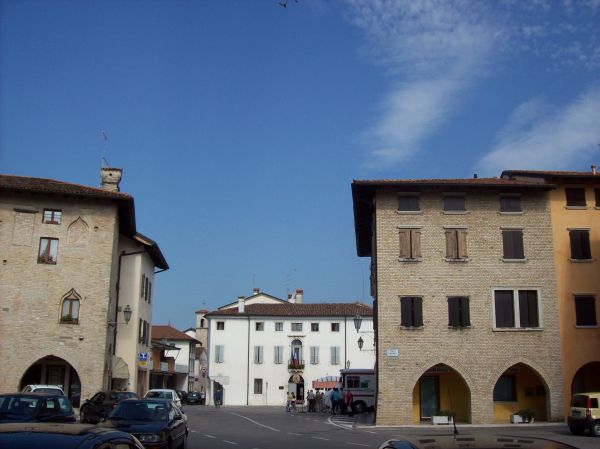
- Piazza Libertà with the Town Hall in Valvasone

- Location of the municipality of Valvasone Arzene in the former province of Pordenone

- Location within Italy Location within Friuli-Venezia Giulia
- Coordinates: 46°0′N 12°52′E
- Country: Italy
- Region: Friuli-Venezia Giulia
- Province: Pordenone (PN)
- Frazioni: Arzene, San Lorenzo, Valvasone

Government
  - Mayor: Fulvio Avoledo (Lista civica)

Area
  - Total: 17.9 km^{2} (6.9 sq mi)
- Elevation: 59 m (194 ft)

Population (31 May 2025)
  - Total: 3,946
  - Density: 220/km^{2} (571/sq mi)
- Demonym(s): Valvasonesi and Arzenesi
- Time zone: UTC+1 (CET)
  - Summer (DST): UTC+2 (CEST)
- Postal code: 33098
- Dialing code: 0434
- Website: Official website

Valvasone Arzene (Friulian: Voleson Darzin) is a comune (municipality) in the Regional decentralization entity of Pordenone in the Italian region of Friuli-Venezia Giulia, located about 80 kilometres (50 mi) northwest of Trieste and about 15 kilometres (9 mi) east of Pordenone. It was formed on 1 January 2015 after the merger of the previous comuni of Valvasone and Arzene.

It is one of I Borghi più belli d'Italia ("The most beautiful villages of Italy").

== History ==
The early history of the castle of Valvasone tells how in 1218 CE the original manor-house was kept by Ulvino and Bonfante for the Patriarch of Aquileia. These were the founders of the first feudal family, but in 1268 this family was killed during the rebellion of Corrado from Valvasone. The side of the Tagliamento River, which flows near the town, was too strategically important to leave it without any form of control, so the Patriarch assigned Walterpertoldo from Spilimbergo to control the area. In 1273 he did a great restoration to the buildings near the river, in order to effect the best form of control against invasion. These works, however, did not modify the structure of the town, that has the castle in its centre and the other buildings are situated around it. When Walterpertoldo died, and the first generation of the Spilimbergo ended, a contest for the succession in controlling Valvasone began between two really important families in the area: the Zuccola and the Cucagna. In 1292 the Patriarch Raimondo della Torre gave to Simone di Cucagna the power to control Valvasone and its surroundings, beginning the second genealogy of feudal overlords of Valvasone.

In that period Valvasone had a militar structure, but it was also the residence of those nobles who built the real village, the precursor of the modern town. Before 1300 the nobles decided to build up a surrounding stone wall; this was possible because they parcelled out the urban pieces of land and then gave these pieces to the craftsmen and shopkeepers. In front of the drawbridge the public loggia was built. Meanwhile, a well was dug by the Torre delle Ore. Now these interventions are difficult to find because of more recent constructions. In the 1350s the nobles decided to enlarge the village: in this way they create one of the most beautiful examples of medieval town-planning in west Friuli. In the north area they built a small church, devoted to San Giacomo and outside of the walls a small village was created, with its own church, dedicated to S. Giovanni and S. Maria.

For about a decade the look of the town remained basically the same, but after the fall of the Patriarch and the arrive of the Venetians, the structure of Valvasone wasn't adequate to sustain the increasing commerce and traffic along the way Portogruaro-Venzone. So Giacomo Giorgio from Valvasone wanted to expand the village but also to restore the old buildings and the churches. He was responsible for the construction of the dom (1449) in the middle of the intern village. Because of that the two others churches were abandoned. The new division of land into smaller pieces was more residential than the previous two and in this division was built a new small church, devoted to Ss. Pietro and Paolo, saints loved by the population. In the end the hospital, which operated since 1335, was restored.

In 1511 the population attacked the castle, which however was empty, and it was set to fire. In the late 19th century, as in a lot of towns in Friuli, the walls were destroyed, but the medieval atmosphere is still untouched.

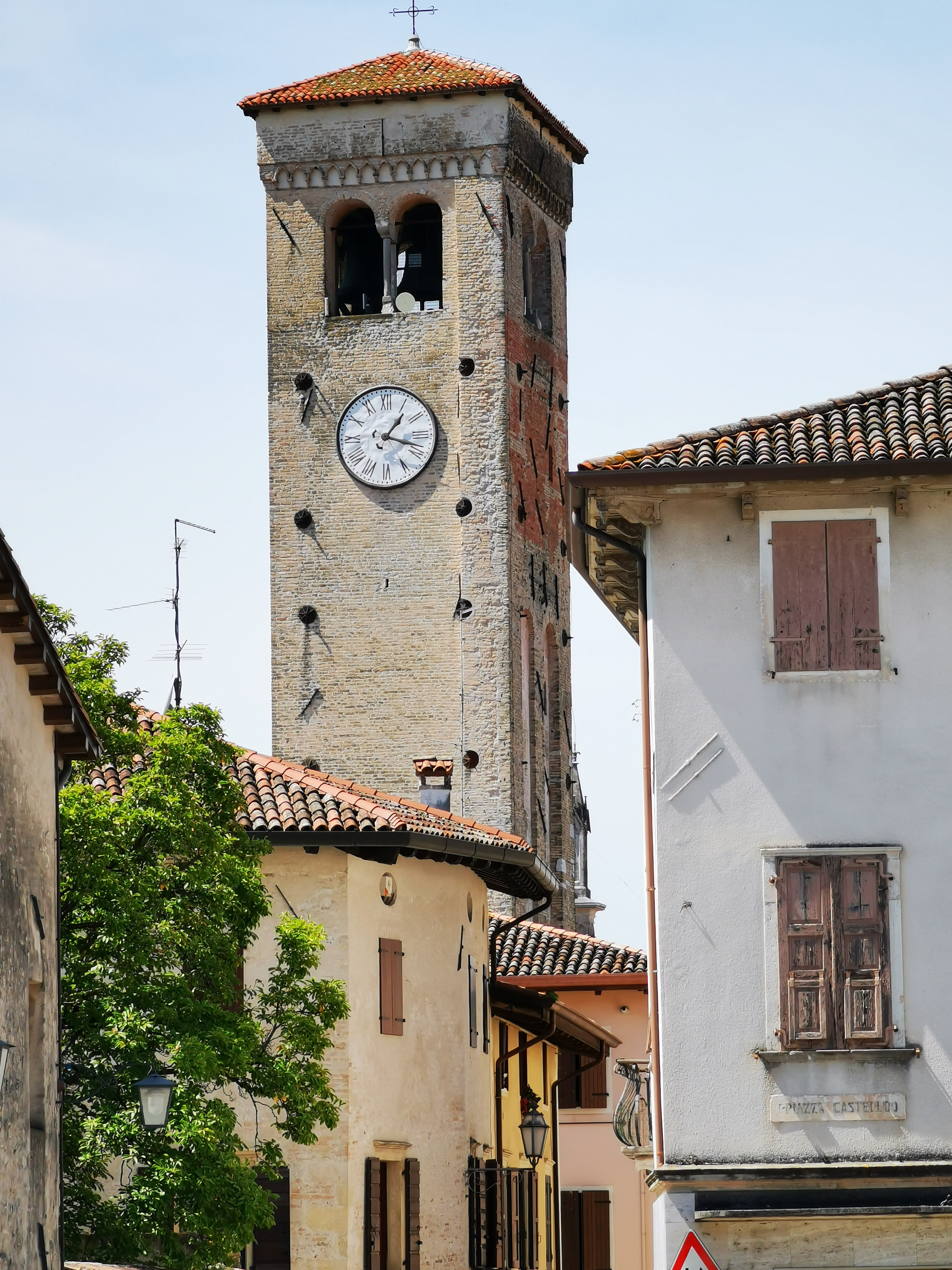
Valvasone view

== Monuments and places of interest ==
=== Valvasone ===
- Valvasone Castle declared a national monument
- Cathedral of the Most Holy Body of Christ

=== Arzene ===
- Parish Church of San Michele Arcangelo, 1953
- Church of Santa Margherita, c. 1000

=== Other locations ===
- New Parish Church of San Lorenzo Martire, 1952 (San Lorenzo)
- Old Parish Church of the Madonna del Rosario, 1200–1300. The church houses the painting of the "chained she-devil." The fresco has been considered by historians to be of considerable importance in the history of the plague of 1348 that afflicted all of Europe.
- Monument to World Peace, Majaroff, 1983
- Majaroff Church, 2008
- Majaroff Mill
- Ancient Roman necropolis in Pras di Sora (discovered in 1996). Traces and artifacts from Roman antiquity have also emerged in Majaroff.

== Demographic evolution ==
Historical population

Year	Pop.	±%
1861	?	—
1871	2,961	—
1881	3,195	+7.9%
1901	3,794	+18.7%
1911	4,772	+25.8%
1921	5,626	+17.9%

Year	Pop.	±%
1931	5,006	−11.0%
1936	4,611	−7.9%
1951	4,750	+3.0%
1961	4,019	−15.4%
1971	3,685	−8.3%
1981	3,622	−1.7%

Year	Pop.	±%
1991	3,444	−4.9%
2001	3,544	+2.9%
2011	3,967	+11.9%
2021	3,917	−1.3%

Source: Data from ISTAT

=== Foreign ethnicities and minorities ===
As of 31 December 2024 foreigners residents in the municipality were 464, i.e. 11.6% of the population. The largest foreign community comes from Romania, with 44.4% of all foreigners present in the country, followed by Albania and Ukraine.

== Events ==
- Zir dai Arboras: during the night of 5 January, a great number of Epiphany fires are lighted, and by every fire there is a combination of music, warm spicy wine and cakes.
- San Pietro and San Paolo celebration: during June the town honors the two patrons.
- Medioevo a Valvasone: historical evocation in the second week end of September.

== People ==
- Tullio Avoledo
- Harry Bertoia
- Antonio Montico
