= Assemblies of God (disambiguation) =

Assemblies of God is a Pentecostal movement. "Assemblies of God" may refer to one of many groups within this movement:

- World Assemblies of God Fellowship, the 1988 largest worldwide association with the name Assemblies of God
- Assemblies of God USA, officially the General Council of the Assemblies of God — the 1914 direct U.S. member of the World Assemblies of God, sometimes referred to as the "General Council" denomination by other AOG denominations in the U.S.
- Assembleias de Deus, a 1911 Brazilian denomination that has schismed since the 1980s, with some descendants still in communion with the World Assemblies of God
- General Convention of the Assemblies of God in Brazil, the Brazilian denomination in full communion with the Assemblies of God USA
- Assembly of God Bethlehem Ministry, a 1995 non-territorial organization based in Florida, USA, but associated with the Brazilian Assembleias de Deus
- Australian Christian Churches — the direct Australian member of the World Assemblies of God
- one of the other national organizations in the list of Assemblies of God National Fellowships

There are independent Assemblies of God groups or denominations with similar names:

- Assemblies of God International Fellowship (AGIF), also known as Assemblies of God International Brotherhood, and more recently the E4 Ministry Network
- International Assemblies of God Fellowship (IAOG), based in Martinsburg, West Virginia
- Independent Assemblies of God, International (IAOGI), formed in 1935 by the merger of the Scandinavian Assemblies of God in the United States of America, Canada and Foreign Lands, with the Independent Pentecostal Churches
- Pentecostal Assemblies of God of America (PAGA), founded in 2013 in California
- United Pentecostal Council of the Assemblies of God, Incorporated (UPCAG), founded in 1919 and affiliated with the Assemblies of God USA since 2014

== See also ==
- Assemblies of Yahweh, exclusively uses the name Yahweh for God
