= List of Assemblies of God National Fellowships =

This list of Assemblies of God National Fellowships is a list of 144 autonomous associated national groupings of Assemblies of God churches. The information comes from the World Assemblies of God Fellowship.

== Africa ==
- Angola Assemblies of God
- Assemblies of God in Benin
- Assemblies of God in Botswana
- Assemblies of God in Cameroon
- Assemblies of God in Ethiopia
- Assemblies of God in Gabon
- Assemblies of God in Guinea
- Assemblies of God in Ivory Coast
- Assemblies of God in Mauritius
- Assemblies of God in Mozambique
- Assemblies of God in South Africa
- Assemblies of God in Togo
- Pentecostal Assemblies of God in Zambia
- Assemblies of God of Cape Verde
- Assemblies of God of Madagascar
- Assemblies of God of Niger
- Assemblies of God of Reunion Island
- Assemblies of God of the Democratic Republic of the Congo
- Assemblies of God, Ghana
- Burkina Faso Assemblies of God
- Church of the Assemblies of God of the Congo
- Full Gospel Mission of Cameroon
- General Council of the Assemblies of God Nigeria
- General Council of the Assemblies of God in Zimbabwe
- General Council of the Assemblies of God of Equatorial Guinea
- International Assemblies of God South Africa
- Kenya Assemblies of God
- Lesotho Assemblies of God
- Liberia Assemblies of God
- Malawi Assemblies of God
- Namibia Assemblies of God
- Pentecostal Assemblies of God of Kenya
- Pentecostal Assemblies of Malawi
- Pentecostal Assemblies of Zimbabwe
- Rwanda Pentecostal Assemblies of God
- Senegal Assemblies of God
- Sierra Leone Assemblies of God
- Swaziland Assemblies of God
- Tanzania Assemblies of God
- Uganda Assemblies of God

== Asia–Pacific ==
- Australian Christian Churches
- Bangladesh Assemblies of God
- Assemblies of God Cook Island
- Assemblies of God of Fiji
- Ecclesia Ministries Limited (Hong Kong)
- Japan Assemblies of God
- Assemblies of God in India
- Gereja Sidang-Sidang Jemaat Allah Indonesia
- Korea
  - Assemblies of God of Korea
  - Assemblies of God of Korea Yoido General Council
  - General Council of the Korea Assemblies of God
- Assemblies of God of Malaysia
- Assemblies of God of Myanmar
- Mongolia Assemblies of God (MAoG)
- Assemblies of God in New Zealand
  - Samoan Assemblies of God in New Zealand
  - Tongan Assemblies of God in New Zealand
- Assemblies of God in Pakistan
- Philippines General Council of the Assemblies of God
- District Council of the Assemblies of God in Samoa
  - Assemblies of God in American Samoa
  - Assemblies of God in Tuvalu
- Assemblies of God Tahiti
- Taiwan Assemblies of God
- Kingdom of Tonga Assemblies of God
- Assemblies of God of Singapore
- Assemblies of God in Sri Lanka
- Assemblies of God in Vietnam

== Europe ==
- Assemblies of God in Armenia
- United Church of Christians of Evangelical Faith (Belarus)
- Apostolic Church in the Czech Republic
- Assemblies of God of France
- Federation of Pentecostal Churches (Germany)
- Assemblies of God in Great Britain
- Apostolic Church of Pentecost of Greece
- Assemblies of God Ireland
- Assemblies of God in Italy
- Assemblies of God Luxembourg
- United Pentecostal and Evangelical Churches (Netherlands)
- Pentecostal Church in Poland
- Assemblies of God of Portugal
- Assemblies of God in Romania
- Russia
  - Russian Assemblies of God
  - Union of Pentecostal Christians of Evangelical Faith
- Apostolic Church in the Slovak Republic
- Assemblies of God of Spain
- Swiss Pentecostal Mission

== Latin American/Caribbean ==
- Assemblies of God in Colombia
- Assemblies of God Dominican Republic
- Assemblies of God in Guatemala
- Assemblies of God in Guyana
- Assemblies of God in Haiti
- Assemblies of God in Paraguay
- Assemblies of God in the Bahamas
- Assemblies of God in Uruguay
- Assemblies of God Nicaragua
- Assemblies of God of Bolivia
- Assemblies of God of Chile
- Assemblies of God of Costa Rica
- Assemblies of God of Ecuador
- Assemblies of God of El Salvador
- Assemblies of God of Honduras
- Assemblies of God of Mexico
- Assemblies of God Suriname
- General Convention of the Assemblies of God in Brazil
- General Council of the Assemblies of God in Jamaica
- General Council of the Assemblies of God in Panama
- General Council of the Assemblies of God of Belize
- Pentecostal Assemblies of the West Indies
- Union of the Assemblies of God of Argentina

== Middle East ==
- Jama'at-e Rabbani (Assemblies of God in Iran)

== North America ==
- Canada
  - Canadian Assemblies of God
  - Pentecostal Assemblies of Canada
  - Pentecostal Assemblies of Newfoundland and Labrador
  - Association chrétienne pour la francophonie
- Assemblies of God USA

== Bibliography ==
- Edith Waldvogel Blumhofer, Restoring the Faith: The Assemblies of God, Pentecostalism, and American Culture, University of Illinois Press, USA, 1993
- Margaret M. Poloma, John C. Green, The Assemblies of God: Godly Love and the Revitalization of American Pentecostalism, NYU Press, USA, 2010
- Allan H. Anderson, To the Ends of the Earth: Pentecostalism and the Transformation of World Christianity, Oxford University Press, USA, 2013
