= Sewer Murders =

Unsolved Frankfurt murders

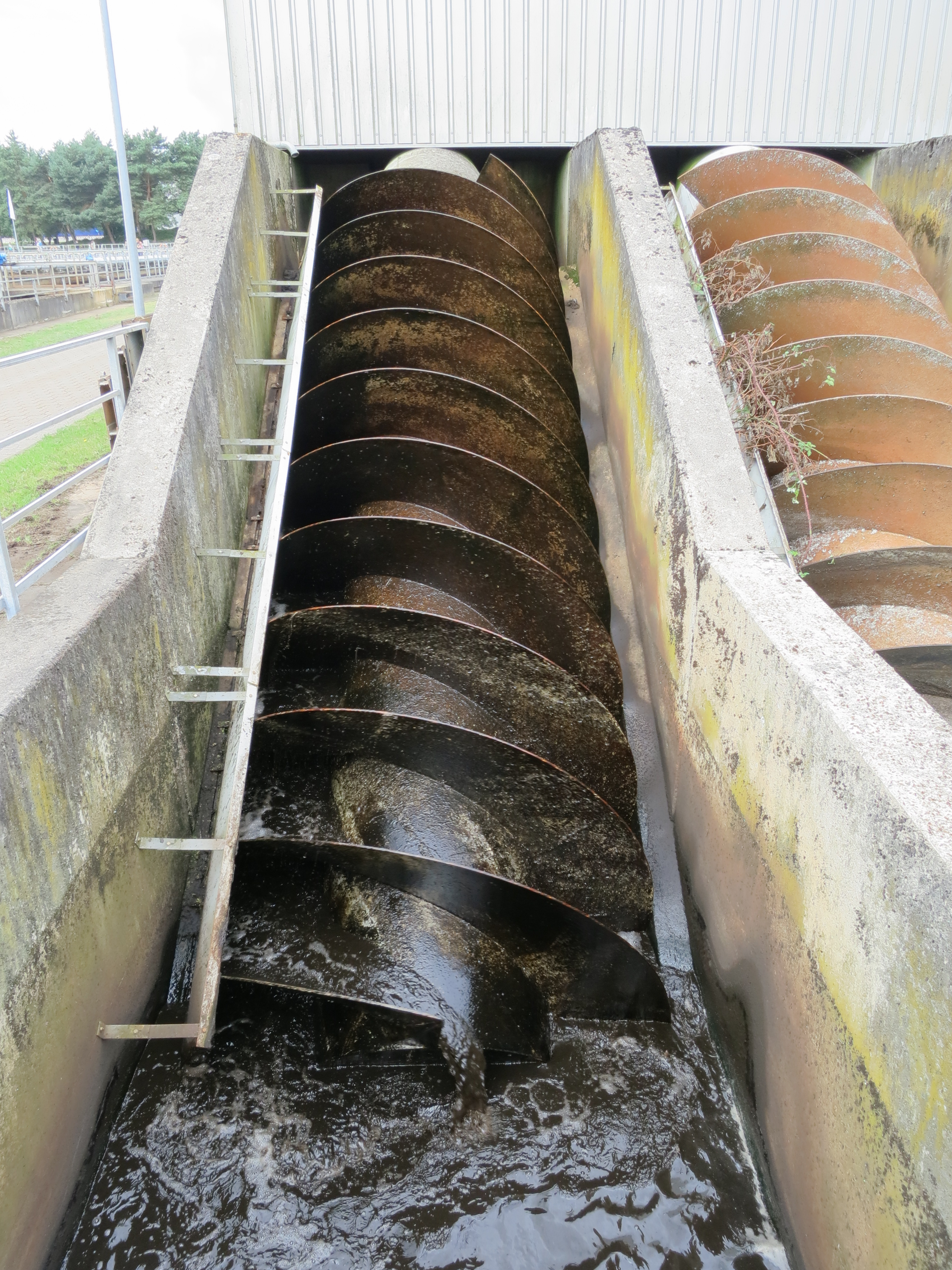
Screw conveyors of a sewage treatment plant

The Sewer Murders or "Sewage Plant Murders" (German: Kanalmorde or Kläranlagenmorde) were an unexplained murder series of male adolescents in the Frankfurt Rhine-Main area during the 1970s and 1980s.

== Victims ==
The killings took place from 1976 to 1983. The victims were seven boys and male adolescents aged between 11 and 18 from Frankfurt (likely Baseler Platz at the "Tivoli" arcade) or the Offenbach station area where some of them may have worked as prostitutes and met the culprit. The boys' hands were tied to the back with a rope or cord and then killed by apparent blunt force. For some, however, death presumably occurred by drowning in the sewerage. Due to long submersion in the sewage and partly strong damage to the corpses by screw conveyors, the victims were identified relatively late, and on only one, clear signs of blunt force trauma to the head had been found.

== Victim list ==
- 7 September 1976: Unidentified male (15–18 years), found in Stangenrod, Giessen. The naked corpse of a young man, only in socks, was found near a footpath in a forest between Atzenhain and Lehnheim during the military manoeuvre "Gordian Shield". The body was heavily mummified with partial skeletonization after a lying time of at least six weeks. A violent skull fracture had been found to be the probable cause of death. Since the identity of the decedent could not be clarified, the police assumed that he may have been a foreigner in transit through West Germany.
- 23 May 1982: Erik (17), Dreieich, Offenbach. Found in an oblique position behind an inflow. The body had significant damage, such as the right thigh being torn off, the pelvis and skull being smashed, and exposed bones. According to the autopsy report, the corpse was in an advanced state of decomposition with extensive adipocere growth. He was probably lying there for over six months, and the cause of death could no longer be determined.
- 19 September 1982: Bernd Michel (17–18 years), Darmstadt-Erzhausen. The collecting rake was blocked by a clothed body. Michel was probably still alive when he was thrown into a manhole, and most likely drowned. The identification of the almost unrecognizable corpse was difficult. The young man was around 17 years old and was characterized by a clear overbite. He was a prostitute in Frankfurt.
- 2 July 1983: Markus Hildebrandt (17 years), Darmstadt-Erzhausen. A tattooed body was discovered in the sump of the Dreieich-Buchschlag sewage plant. According to the Offenbach police, the decedent was washed ashore by a sewage pipe. His hands were handcuffed, but there were no other externally visible injuries. The tattoos on the upper arms showed different motifs and the word "Fuck". Hildebrandt came from Hanau and had been involved in the Frankfurt heroin scene since 1981. Hildebrandt, who had spent much of his youth in congregate care, was in apprenticeship and lived a "restless life" in Frankfurt. He is said to have occasionally prostituted. He was last seen in January 1983, accompanied by three men, and allegedly claimed to be travelling to Saarbrücken.
- 9 September 1983: Fuad Rahou (14 years), Niederrad. The body of the 14-year-old Moroccan boy was found in the Niederrad sewage treatment plant. At first, it was assumed that Rahou had drowned accidentally or inhaled marsh gasses. Only later did it become clear that he must have been murdered. Rahou had been reported missing since 1 September 1983, by his parents.
- 11 October 1983: Oliver Tupikas (11 years), Niederrad. The youngest victim, was also found in Niederrad's sewage treatment plant. Probably pushed down a manhole after being murdered. Traces of legcuffs were found on the body. Oliver had run away from home and had not been seen alive since.
- 21 June 1989: Daniel Schaub (14 years), Offenbach-Rosenhöhe. Bones and pieces of clothing from the presumably last victim were found in a tributary of the drainage system. The teenager had been missing since 1983.

== Possible motive ==
The criminal psychologist Rudolf Egg suggested that the suspect might be a single person at the age of about 50 years without family ties or friends. It is possible that the culprit himself had been a victim of sexual abuse and may therefore have developed a disturbed relationship with his own homosexuality or with other same-sex people. His inclinations apparently include sadistic bondage. The suspect likely moved from Giessen to Frankfurt at the end of the 1970s and lived out his fetishes in the local milieu. He had also been familiar with the area and was highly mobile. The fact that he threw his victims into the sewerage after violating them is probably a hint of a deep-rooted hatred.

== Modus operandi ==
The first murder is believed to have happened at the body's site of discovery. Only when he resumed killing, the suspect could have figured out that throwing a dead or dying victim down the sewers was a more effective way to get rid of them. The quick disposal of the bodies allowed him to carry out his murders even within the densely populated Frankfurt area, without a risk of being caught. The victims were tied up, then the killer abused them and "disposed of them like garbage". For weeks or even months, the bodies in the sewers began to decompose. The dead usually remained undetected in the sewage system for a long time until they were eventually flushed into the sewage treatment plants, where they often blocked the screw pumps to separate the solid particles. The advanced decomposition of the bodies has made the identification and the clarification of the factual circumstances in the investigation much more difficult. The first victim, for instance, was identified 2.5 years after discovery.

== Investigation ==
Horst Kropp and the "AG 229" were entrusted with the investigation of sexually motivated murders of young people. For some time, a 40-year-old storeman from Offenbach, who was mainly convicted of multiple sexual misconducts toward minors and molestation, had been the prime suspect. He was known for enticing homeless teens to his summer house in Riederwald where he performed sadistic sex games with them. He is said to have acted very brutally during these but bribed his victims with money to keep quiet about what he did to them. Investigators found out that the prime suspect and Markus Hildebrandt had visited the same gay bars in Frankfurt. However, this was not sufficient evidence, as the traces of blood found in the summer house did not match Hildebrandt's. In the home of the suspect, who had known two of the other victims alongside Hildebrandt, police secured a gas pistol, several knives, including a butcher knife, and handcuffs. Due to lack of evidence, however, there were no charges.

== See also ==
- List of fugitives from justice who disappeared
- List of German serial killers
- List of unsolved murders (1980–1999)

== Literature ==
- Stephan Harbort: Mörderisches Profil: Phänomen Serienkiller, Heyne Verlag, 2006, ISBN 978-3453878808.
