= VPE =

VPE may refer to:

- Ondjiva Pereira Airport, Angola
- Verb phrase ellipsis
- Vero Precision Engineering Ltd
- Vice president of engineering, a job title
- Video Processing Engine
- United Pentecostal and Evangelical Churches (Dutch: Verenigde Pinkster- en Evangeliegemeenten)

== See also ==
- Vape
