= St. Mark's Church, Dublin =

St Mark's Church
- St Mark's Pentecostal Church
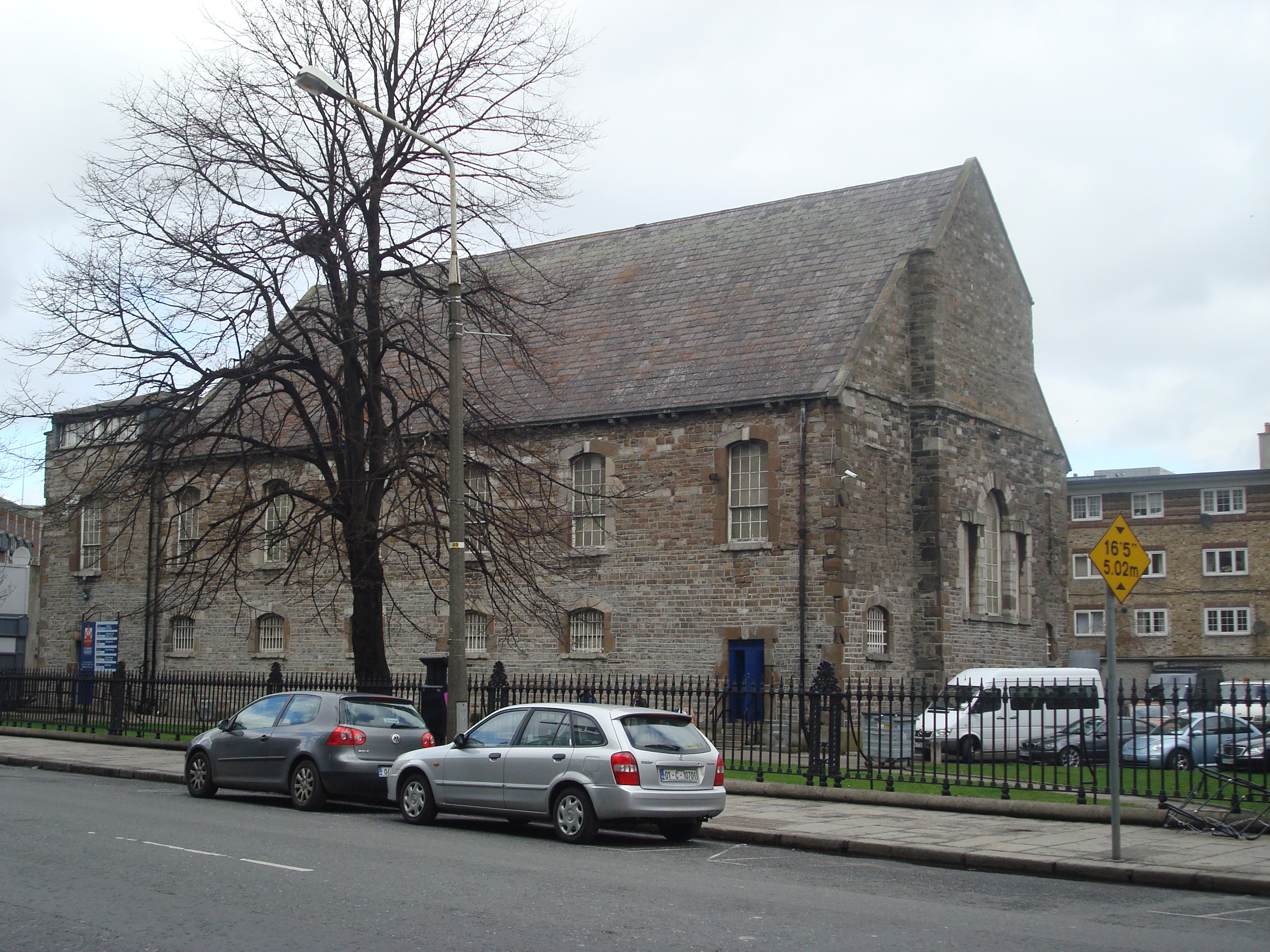
- St Mark's Church in 2010
- St Mark's Church
- 53°20′41.26″N 6°15′3.7″W
- Address: 42A Pearse Street, Dublin
- Country: Ireland
- Denomination: Pentecostal
- Previous denomination: Church of Ireland (1729 – 1971)
- Website: stmarks.ie

History
- Status: Church (1729 – 1971); College (1971 – 1987); Church (since 1987)
- Founded: 1729
- Dedication: Mark the Evangelist
- Consecrated: 25 April 1757 by Archbishop Charles Cobbe

Architecture
- Functional status: Active
- Heritage designation: Protected
- Architect: James Franklin Fuller (1878 repairs)
- Architectural type: Georgian Church
- Completed: 1757
- Closed: 1971 (by the Church of Ireland)

Specifications
- Materials: Limestone (calp) with granite dressings

St Mark's Church is a Pentecostal church located at 42A Pearse Street, Dublin, Ireland. The church is affiliated with Christian Churches Ireland, the Irish branch of the Assemblies of God. The church has two Sunday services; 10am and 11:45am.

Built in 1729 as a Church of Ireland parish church, closed by the Anglicans in 1971, the building was acquired by Trinity College Dublin, before becoming a Pentecostal church in 1987.

== Church of Ireland ownership ==
=== The church building ===
The former Church of Ireland church building is a large building surrounded by a grassy churchyard, and was erected in 1729 off what was then Great Brunswick Street, now Pearse Street. It was consecrated by the Church of Ireland Archbishop of Dublin, Charles Cobbe, on St Mark's Day, 25 April 1757.

Works were carried out on the church in 1853 by the Ecclesiastical Commissioners.

The Church of Ireland closed the St Mark's Church in 1971. Its contents were distributed throughout the Church of Ireland, and the parish records were transferred to the Representative Church Body. After its closure the building was purchased by Trinity College Dublin which used it occasionally for exams and lectures.

In 1987 the building was purchased by the Family Worship Centre, a Pentecostal assembly, renovated, and re-opened as a place of worship.

=== The parish ===
The former Church of Ireland congregation was formed from that of St Andrew's Church, Dublin by a 1707 Act of Parliament, and corresponded to the civil parish of the same name.

=== The churchyard ===
The church was surrounded on three sides by a churchyard which contained a large number of graves. In the 18th and early 19th centuries it was a favourite target of body snatchers, owing to its proximity to Trinity College, which taught medicine. A wall was built around the churchyard to try to prevent access. In 1892-3 the wall was removed and a railing substituted.

== Notable parishioners ==
- Oscar Wilde was baptised in the former Church of Ireland church
- Katie Taylor, an Olympic gold medalist, is a member of the Pentecostal congregation
