= Peter Sleebos =

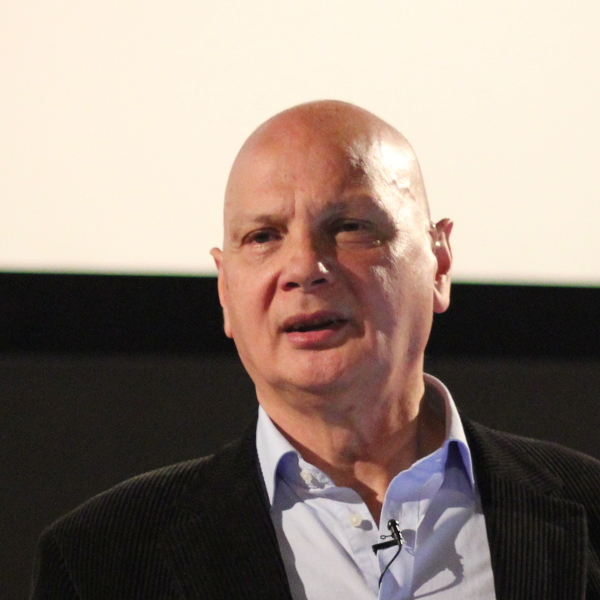
Peter Sleebos

Peter Sleebos (born 5 August 1949, Malang, Indonesia) is a Dutch pastor and leader of the Pentecostal movement.

Sleebos has been the chairman of the United Pentecostal and Evangelical Churches (VPE) since its establishment in 2000. With over 22,000 members, it is the largest denomination of Pentecostal churches in the Netherlands. Sleebos is also vice chairman of the Evangelische Omroep (EO).

Before the merger into the VPE, Sleebos was chairman of the Brotherhood of Pentecostal Churches. He is also the chairman of the National Platform of the Pentecostal and Evangelical Movement and a guest teacher at Azusa Theological Seminary. Earlier, he was pastor of a Pentecostal church in Alkmaar and missionary in Indonesia.

Sleebos is married to Corrie Sleebos; they have three children: Eugenie, Maresca and Yanto.
