= Taiwan Assemblies of God =

The China Assemblies of God Taiwan General Council is a Chinese Pentecostal church that was established in Taiwan in 1952. The church was founded by and continues to have strong ties to the Springfield, Missouri based Assemblies of God, the largest of the American Pentecostal denominations. There is another AG body called Taiwan Assemblies of God which was established by the Finnish mission FIDA (formerly FFFM).

== Historical background ==
In 1914, the leaders of the emerging Pentecostal movement founded the Assemblies of God in the United States. Its purpose, they asserted, was to preserve the harvest of newly won souls. The new denomination soon became the largest and best organized of the various emerging Pentecostal churches. In 1916, a Foreign Mission Division was established and its leaders then attempted to bring under its banner the independent Pentecostals and the missionaries of the theologically similar Christian and Mission Alliance missionaries. This effort had pretty much succeeded by the early 1920s. The Foreign Mission Division of the Assemblies of God now began the task of recruiting new missionaries, supplying funds for their support, and providing direction over their efforts in the field.

By the early 1920s, there were already forty-seven missionaries who served the Assemblies of God. They included Victor Plymire, who explored the provinces of western China and Tibet and whose son would serve in the Taiwan mission. The difficult years of the 1920s and 1930s, when the Protestant and Catholic mission establishments found themselves threatened by overt Chinese hostility, were even more dangerous for AG missionaries, many of whom worked in remote sections of the hinterland. Not all survived these treacherous times. W.E. Simpson was slain in a bandit ambush in 1932, but the mission continued to grow. By 1933, there were sixty-seven missionaries in China located at twenty-six stations. The missionaries had also recruited a number of local workers. That same year, 155 Chinese helped the Westerners as evangelists and Bible workers. After the Sino-Japanese War and the disruption it brought (in some cases Pentecostal missionaries were interned by the Japanese), the Foreign Mission Division began an extensive reassessment of their efforts. As a result of meetings held in Springfield, Missouri in 1945, they committed themselves to an overall expansion of their enterprise in China. One hundred and forty eight churches had been planted.

In 1952, the Assemblies of God Mission Board committed its men and women from the main-land to the island in the hope of establishing Pentecostal churches in the militarily secure Republic of China. They have been there ever since. On Taiwan these missionaries and their Chinese co-workers have been able to develop a small but dedicated body of believers who are part of the worldwide Assemblies of God network. In Taipei, Taichung, Tainan, and Kaohsiung and in the villages in the reservation areas of the island's rugged interior are found Assemblies of God churches made up of mainlanders, Taiwanese, and mountain people. There is a Bible school in Taichung run by the mission and a large A/G run and financed correspondence school now operating in Taipei. Radio ministries such as that established by Jimmy Swaggart, a former A/G pastor, now operate as well and serve to attract Chinese to the church. The Assemblies mission on Taiwan is one that is rather traditional in its operating style.

While some progress has been made, the Assemblies of God missionaries have not been able to expand among the Taiwanese majorities or make much progress among the Taiwanese Aborigines. The Assemblies missionaries knew of the work of the other churches when they began their own efforts but decided that there were unreached peoples in the mountain areas. They have been able to carve out a place for themselves but it has not been easy. Today, the Taiwan Assemblies of God exists as a small church within the larger Protestant community. It holds fast to its Western roots and maintains close ties to its American founders.
