= United Pentecostal and Evangelical Churches =

Dutch Pentecostal denomination

The United Pentecostal and Evangelical Churches (Dutch: Verenigde Pinkster- en Evangeliegemeenten, abbreviated VPE) is the largest Pentecostal and evangelical Christian denomination in the Netherlands. It was created on February 16, 2002, when the Brotherhood of Pentecostal Churches (Broederschap van Pinkstergemeenten) and the Full Gospel Churches of the Netherlands (Volle-Evangeliegemeenten Nederland) merged. The VPE is the Dutch branch of the Assemblies of God. In 2025, it had 136 associated churches, 140 associated churchleaders, who represent around 15,000 churchmembers (https://vpe.nl/dit-zijn-wij/)

== Organisation ==
Local churches have relative autonomy, and the national office, based in Urk, functions as a facilitator of local churches. Peter Sleebos has chaired the VPE since its founding. Clergy and other church workers are trained at Azusa Theological College, which has resided at the Free University in Amsterdam since 2002. The Free University also has an academic chair of Pentecostalism.

== Relations with other Churches ==
Internationally, the VPE is a member of the World Assemblies of God Fellowship (WAGF). Within Europe, the VPE cooperates closely with Assemblies of God churches in Germany and Flanders—the Federation of Pentecostal Churches and the Verbond van Vlaamse Pinkstergemeenten respectively. The VPE is also a member of the Pentecostal European Fellowship.

In the Netherlands the VPE cooperate with other Pentecostal and evangelical groups in the National Platform of the Pentecostal and Evangelical Movement and participates in the Evangelical Alliance of the Netherlands. The VPE has continuous dialogues with both the Roman Catholic Church and the Protestant Church in the Netherlands. September 15, 2007, at the occasion of the celebration of the 100 years existence of the Pentecostal movement in the Netherlands at the Olympic Stadium in Amsterdam, Bas Plaisier, secretary general of the Protestant Church in the Netherlands asked for forgiveness for some judgements of the Pentecostals issued by his church in the past. November 16, 2007 Peter Sleebos, chairman of the National Platform did the same vice versa when he addressed the General Synod of the Protestant Church in the Netherlands.
