= International Assemblies of God Fellowship =

The International Assemblies of God Fellowship is an independent, cooperative fellowship of ministers, ministries and churches of Trinitarian Baptistic Pentecostals. Their membership is worldwide, and all churches are independent and autonomous of the fellowship. Dr. Phillip Murray is the President. The International Assemblies of God Fellowship should not be confused with the Assemblies of God International Fellowship, the Independent Assemblies of God International, and the Assemblies of God, all of which are Pentecostal denominations that have good fellowship with one another as organizations.
