= Assemblies of God International Fellowship =

The Assemblies of God International Fellowship (Assemblies of God International Brotherhood) is a Pentecostal denomination. It has 2,000 adherents in USA. Its headquarters are presently in San Diego, California.

== History ==
It rooted in the revival among the Scandinavian Baptists in the Midwest. Strongly against church organization, the Scandinavian Pentecostal Assemblies remained independent and later developed into incorporated denominations, such as the AGIF and the Fellowship of the Christian Assemblies.

It was founded in 1911.

Ministers can only receive credentials by being endorsed by a local church. There exists a rich diversity among the fellowship that is perceived as a strength and advantage for Gospel ministry.

The Assemblies of God International Fellowship should not be confused with the International Assemblies of God Fellowship, the Independent Assemblies of God International, and the Assemblies of God, all of which are Pentecostal denominations that have good fellowship with one another as organizations.

The AGIF has occasional conferences around the country.

AGIF changed its public name to E4 Ministry Network in the 21st century but retained its original name as its legal registered name.

AGIF's strength is in its personal care of its members, Pentecostal emphasis and the spiritual support of its membership.
