= Independent Assemblies of God, International =

Pentecostal Christian association

The Independent Assemblies of God International (IAOGI) is a pentecostal Christian association with roots in a revival of the 1890s among the Scandinavian Baptist and Pietist communities in the United States. Independent Assemblies of God International is a member of the Pentecostal/Charismatic Churches of North America. International offices are located in Laguna Hills, California.

== History ==
In 1907, the Mission of William Howard Durham inspired many congregations and individuals to learn about the Pentecostal movement through Mission in Chicago. One of his assistant elders, F. A. Sandgren, published the Folke-Vennena a periodical for Scandinavians and many Midwest churches joined the Pentecostal movement. In 1918, the denomination was organized as the Scandinavian Assemblies of God in the United States of America, Canada and Foreign Lands with A. W. Rasmussen. In 1935, at the annual convention in Minneapolis, Minnesota, they merged with another group named the Independent Pentecostal Churches, and became Independent Assemblies of God International. In the 1940s and 1950s and organization was deeply influenced and closely connected to the Latter Rain movement and William Branham. Joseph Mattsson-Boze, pastor of the Philadelphia Church in Chicago, became a leader in the movement and his Herald of Faith publication served as a publicity tool for the group. The Latter Rain movement had few requirements for ordaining a minister. In 1959, a split in the IAoG led to the formation of the Fellowship of Christian Assemblies who wanted stricter requirements on the qualifications to become a minister. The IAOGI has congregations in Africa, Canada, Guatemala, India, Mexico, the Philippines, Romania, and the United States. The churches meet in an annual convention. There are approximately 1500 churches worldwide. They are present in India since the second half of the 20th century The area of their work includes Nagaland.

== Beliefs ==
The Independent Assemblies of God International believes some of the uniqueness that sets it apart from other Pentecostal bodies is "its conviction of the sovereignty of the local church". The IAOGI's doctrinal statement reflects the following beliefs:

- The Bible as the inspired and infallible Word of God;
- One God, eternally existent in three persons
- The virgin birth of Christ, His vicarious, atoning death, bodily resurrection, and Ascension
- Salvation through the blood of Jesus Christ
- Water baptism by immersion
- The Lord's Supper
- Divine healing through the redemptive work of Christ on the cross
- The baptism of the Holy Spirit
- The sanctification power of the Holy Spirit;
- The second coming of Jesus Christ;
- The Blessed hope resurrection and translation of those who have fallen asleep in Christ and those who are alive at His coming; and The final judgment of those who have not accepted Christ as Savior, with the devil and his angels in the Lake of Fire.

The Independent Assemblies of God International should not be confused with the Assemblies of God International Fellowship, the International Assemblies of God Fellowship, and the Assemblies of God, all of which are Pentecostal denominations that have good fellowship with one another as organizations.
