= Assemblies of God in Vietnam =

The Assemblies of God in Vietnam (AGVN) is a Pentecostal Christian denomination in Vietnam affiliated with the World Assemblies of God Fellowship. In 2009, there were an estimated 40,000 adherents. The general superintendent of the AGVN as of 2009, Duong Thanh Lam, was elected in 2001.

== History ==
The Assemblies of God in Vietnam began through the relief work of Don Warren and his wife, who in 1970 opened an orphanage with the help of Cao Tan Phat. The work grew, and soon the three founders asked the Assemblies of God USA for help. In 1971 and 1973, the American AG began sending missionaries to Vietnam. They were aided by Philippine Assemblies of God missionaries and native Vietnamese workers. In 1972, the first church was begun in Vung Tau, and in 1973, Glen Stafford started the first Bible school in the same city. In July of that year, the AG was recognized by the South Vietnamese government. Its first general superintendent was John Hurston, an American missionary, and a central office was set up in Saigon. By 1975, there were 10,000 to 15,000 adherents. After the North Vietnamese victory in 1975, the AG, like other churches, was suppressed. Churches were closed and property was confiscated by the communist government and membership dropped dramatically. The effect on the Assemblies of God was so great that a historian has referred to the years 1975-1988 as the "Silent Period".

In the period from 1988-1998, Tran Dinh Paul Ai, who served as AG general secretary before 1975, began to lead the reorganization of the Vietnamese AG. The first general council was called in 1989 and elected Ai as general superintendent. Though still persecuted during this period, the AG grew and established a presence in every part of the country. Today, it is in the process of receiving official recognition from the Vietnamese government, having received an official operating license in October 2009. This gives it the right to legally operate and is the first step to being recognized as an official church. Prior to this, the AG had been an illegal movement since a 1994 registration attempt failed, and members reported widespread human rights violations. Following the granting of a license to operate, the AGVN held its first official general council on October 20, 2010, in Ho Chi Minh City.
