= Pentecostal Assemblies of God of America =

The Pentecostal Assemblies of God of America (PAGA) is a Pentecostal Fellowship founded by Rev. Josiah Drawhorn in San Jacinto, California in 1982. It has today 25 churches, most of them in the West coast, and with some affiliated congregations in India, South Korea, Germany, Canada, and Nepal. The US churches are composed by mostly white members. The current president is Rev. Richard E. Anderson. It is Trinitarian and Fundamentalist. Along the celebration of water baptism and holy supper, the PAGA also observes feet washing.
