= Assemblies of God in Great Britain =

Pentecostal Christian denomination

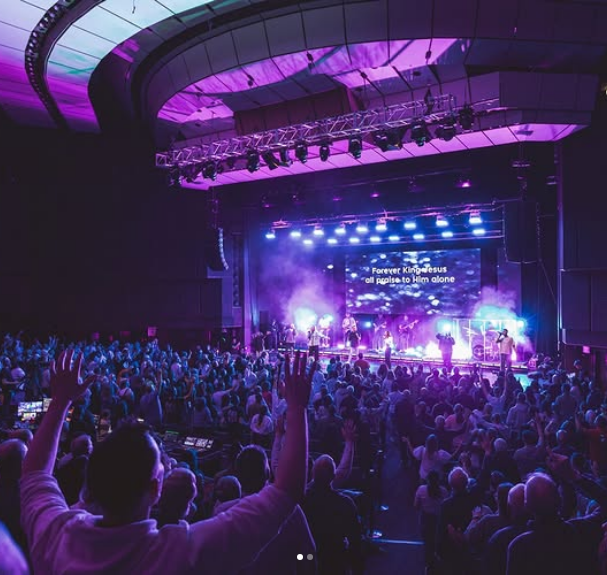
- Classification: Evangelical Christianity
- Theology: Pentecostal
- National Leader: Glyn Barrett
- Associations: World Assemblies of God Fellowship
- Headquarters: Manchester, Great Britain
- Origin: 1924
- Congregations: 654 (as of AoG GB National Conference 2025)
- Official website: www.aoggb.com

The Assemblies of God in Great Britain (AoG GB) is a Pentecostal Christian denomination in Great Britain. It is affiliated with the World Assemblies of God Fellowship. Its headquarters are in Manchester, England.

== History ==
The Assemblies of God in Great Britain has its origins in the beginning of Pentecostalism in Great Britain in 1907. The British Assemblies of God were founded in Birmingham in 1924.

On 22 October 2005 the Irish Region was allowed to join with the Irish Assemblies of God, Republic of Ireland to form the Assemblies of God Ireland. According to a census of the association of churches in 2023, it would have 500 churches.

As of AoG GB's National Conference 2025 there are 654 Congregations across Great Britain.

== Beliefs ==
The Assemblies of God believe in the Statement of Fundamental Truths.

== Structure & Leadership ==
The Assemblies of God is divided into three geographical regions: England, Scotland and Wales. England is then separated further into England North, England Central, England South West and England South East. Each area is overseen by a Country Director and together alongside other key leaders from across Great Britain and the National Leader they form the National Leadership Team.

As of 2019, the National Leader is Glyn Barrett, leader of !Audacious Church in Manchester.
