= Christian Churches Ireland =

Pentecostal Christian denomination in Ireland

- Type: Christian denominaiton
- Classification: Protestant
- Orientation: Pentecostal
- National leader: Brian Somerville
- Associations: World Assemblies of God Fellowship
- Region: Ireland, comprising: Republic of Ireland; Northern Ireland
- Origin: 22 October 2005
- Merger of: Assemblies of God of Great Britain and Ireland (Irish Region); Irish Assemblies of God, Republic of Ireland
- Congregations: 55
- Other names: Assemblies of God Ireland (2005 – 2016)
- Official website: ccireland.ie

Christian Churches Ireland is a Pentecostal Christian denomination located in Ireland and a part of the World Assemblies of God Fellowship.

== History ==
Christian Churches Ireland was formed on October 22, 2005, when the Irish Region of the Assemblies of God of Great Britain and Ireland was allowed to join with the Irish Assemblies of God, Republic of Ireland to form the Assemblies of God Ireland.

The Church has 55 congregations throughout Ireland, in both the Republic of Ireland and Northern Ireland.

In November 2016 the denomination changed its name from Assemblies of God Ireland to Christian Churches Ireland.
