= Erzhausen =

- Municipality
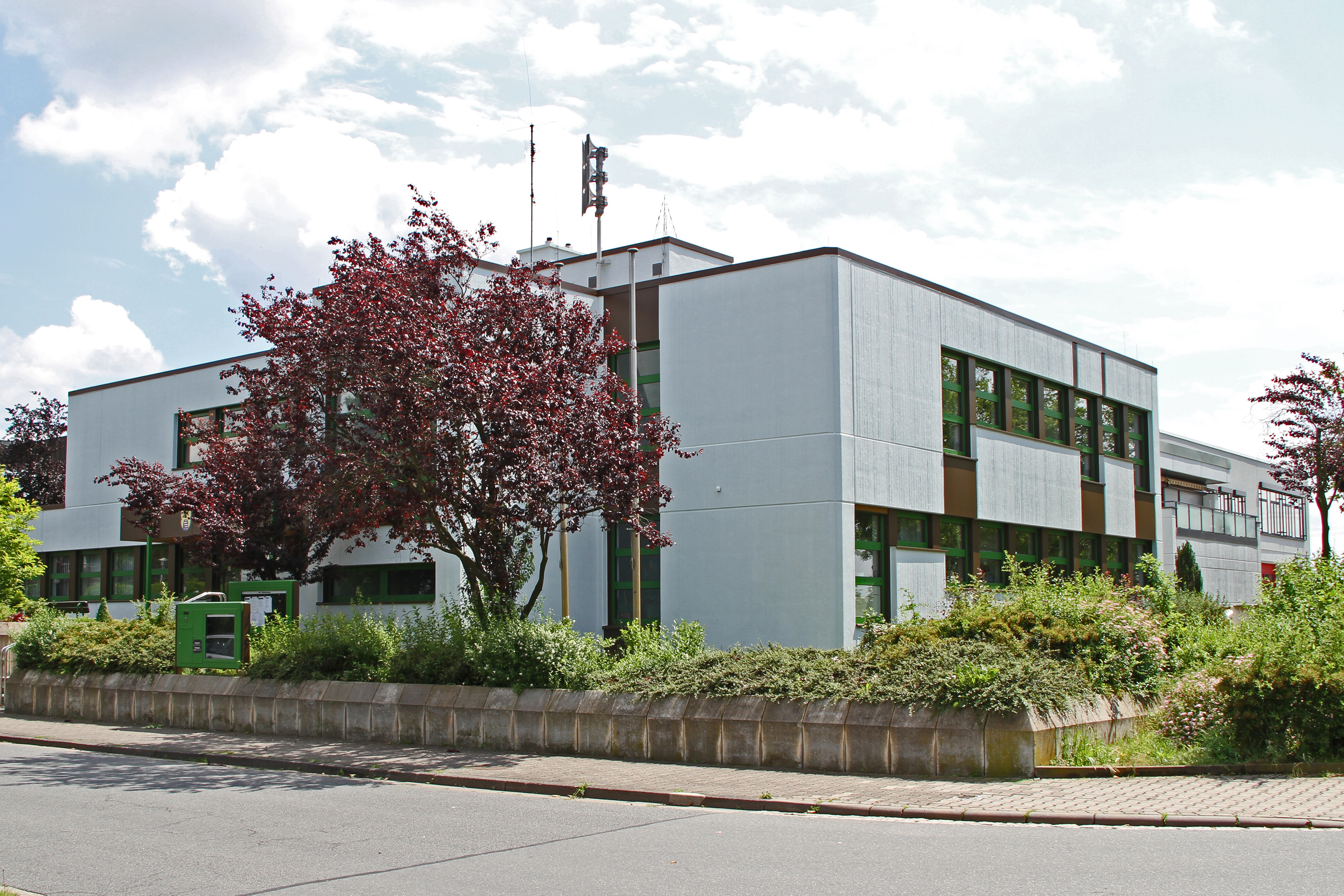
- Town hall

- Coat of arms

- Location of Erzhausen within Darmstadt-Dieburg district
- Interactive map of Erzhausen
- Location within Germany Location within Hesse
- Coordinates: 49°57′N 08°38′E
- Country: Germany
- State: Hesse
- Admin. region: Darmstadt
- District: Darmstadt-Dieburg

Government
  - Mayor (2018–30): Claudia Lange

Area
  - Total: 7.4 km^{2} (2.9 sq mi)
- Elevation: 112 m (367 ft)

Population (2025-12-31)
  - Total: 7,732
  - Density: 1,000/km^{2} (2,700/sq mi)
- Time zone: UTC+01:00 (CET)
  - Summer (DST): UTC+02:00 (CEST)
- Postal codes: 64390
- Dialling codes: 06150
- Vehicle registration: DA
- Website: www.erzhausen.de

Erzhausen is a village and a municipality in southern Hesse, Germany. It is part of the district of Darmstadt-Dieburg. It has about 7,900 inhabitants (2020). Wixhausen, a borough of the City of Darmstadt, is just South of Erzhausen.

== History ==
Settlement in the area dates back to about 1500 B.C., as shown by several cairn burial sites found some kilometres west of the town.

The settlement itself is mentioned in documents from 900 A.D. onward under various names like 'Erardishusen', 'Erhartzhausen', 'Ebrichshusen' or 'Erndeshusen'. The oldest document of the Lorsch codex names it as 'Erhartshausen' ('Houses of Erhart').

After remaining a mostly unimportant farming village until the early 20th century, it grew strongly after the railway line from Frankfurt to Darmstadt was built several kilometers to the east of it. The habitation spread out towards it, and workers employed in the nearby cities (which could now be reached a lot easier) settled here.

Today, it is still mostly a residential village, with some commerce and office activities. There is a small seminary of the German Pentecostalism BFP movement situated in the town, Bible School Beröa also called Theologisches Seminar Beröa .

== Historic names ==
- 10. century: Erhardeshusen
- about 1200: Erhardeshusen
- about 1250: Erharteshusen
- 1264: Erardishusen
- 1273: Erharthusen
- 1273: in villa Erharthusen
- 1282: Eradeshusen
- 1282: Erndeshusen; Ebrathshusen
- 1331: Erarshusen
- 1331: Irtzhusen
- 1413: Ebrichshusen; Erarthusen
- 1413: Ehartzhusen
- 1440: Eretzhusen
- 1446: Erhartzhusen
- 15. century: Erczhussen
- 1451: Erhartshusen
- 1452: Erhartshusen
- 1453: Erhartshusen
- 1454: Erhartßhussen
- 1454: Erhartßhußen
- 1497: Ertzhusen
- 1506: Erhartzhausen
- 1526: Ertzhusen
- 1541: Erhartshaussen
- 1549: Erhartshausen
- 1576: Ertzhaussen
- 1579: Ertzhausen
- today: Erzhausen

== Demography ==
Demography

Year	Population
1618	ca. 250
1622	ca. 200
1629	29 "Hausgesessene"
1641	ca. 50
1648	uninhabited
1669	73
1771	559
1829	559
1834	567
1840	596
1846	643
1852	692
1858	726
1864	787
1871	829
1875	898
1885	1.053
1895	1.151

Year	Population
1900	1.244
1905	1.390
1910	1.556
1925	1.872
1933	2.258
1939	2.342
1946	2.859
1950	3.086
1956	3.471
1961	4.098
1967	5.296
1970	5.663
1981	6.208
2004	7.186
2011	7.503
2012	7.578
2013	7.699
2014	7.716

Year	Population
2015	7.864
2016	8.126

== Twin towns – sister cities ==
- 1997 Mnichovo Hradiště, Czech Republic
- 2006 Incisa in Val d'Arno, Italy
- 2013 Malgrat de Mar, Spain
- 2017 Ivanychi, Ukraine

== Gallery ==
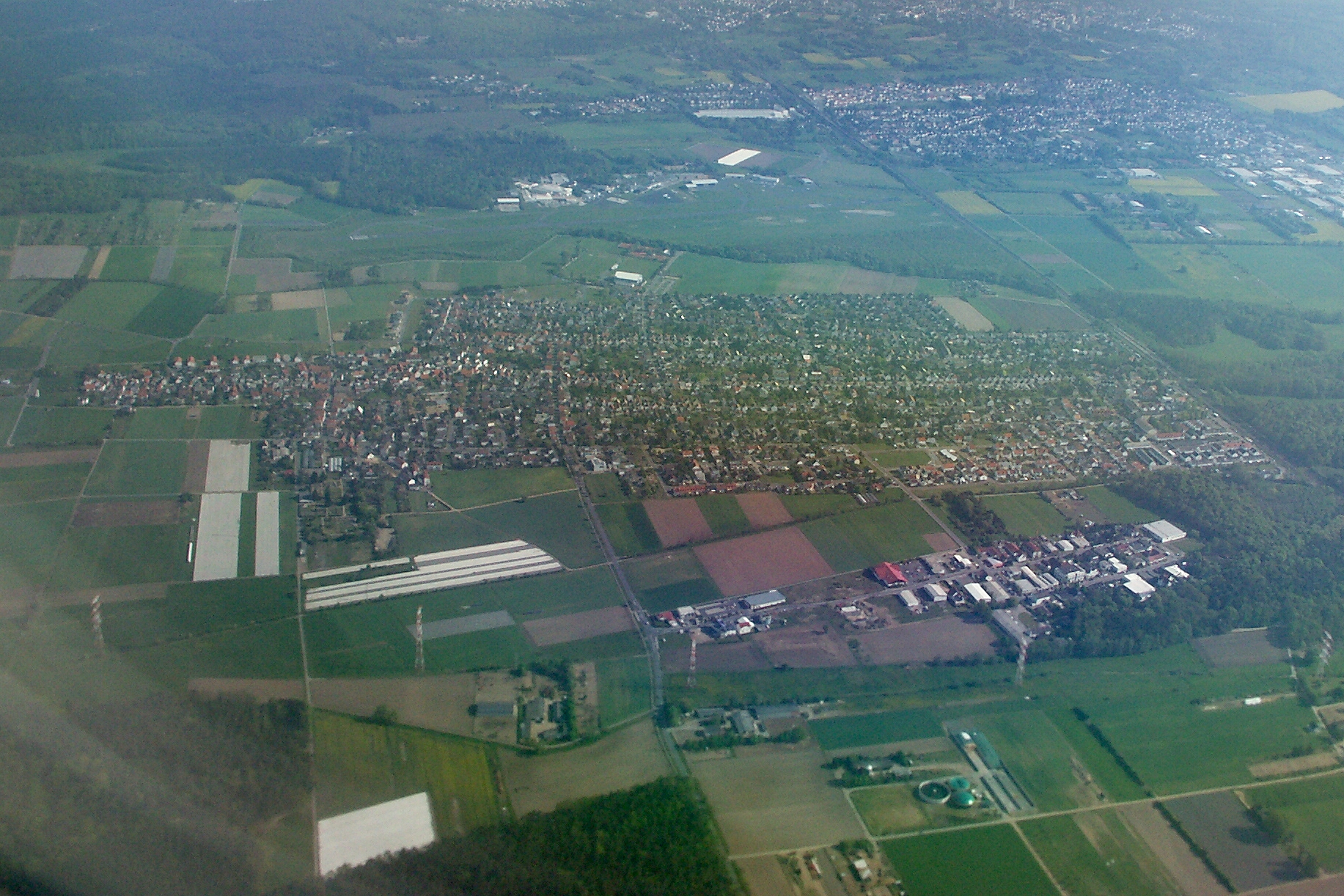
Erzhausen from the air (2010)

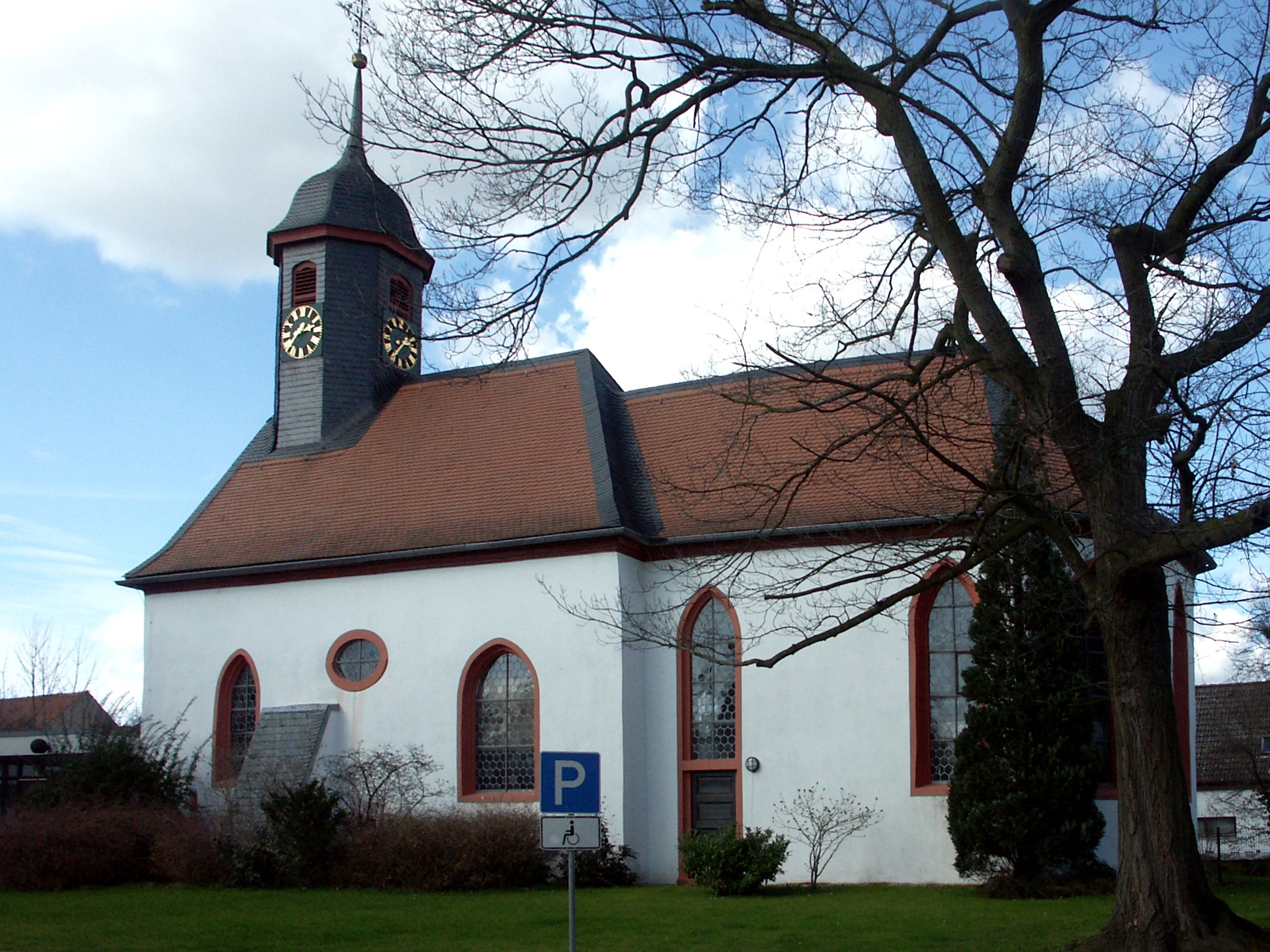
Evangelical Lutheran Church (2007)

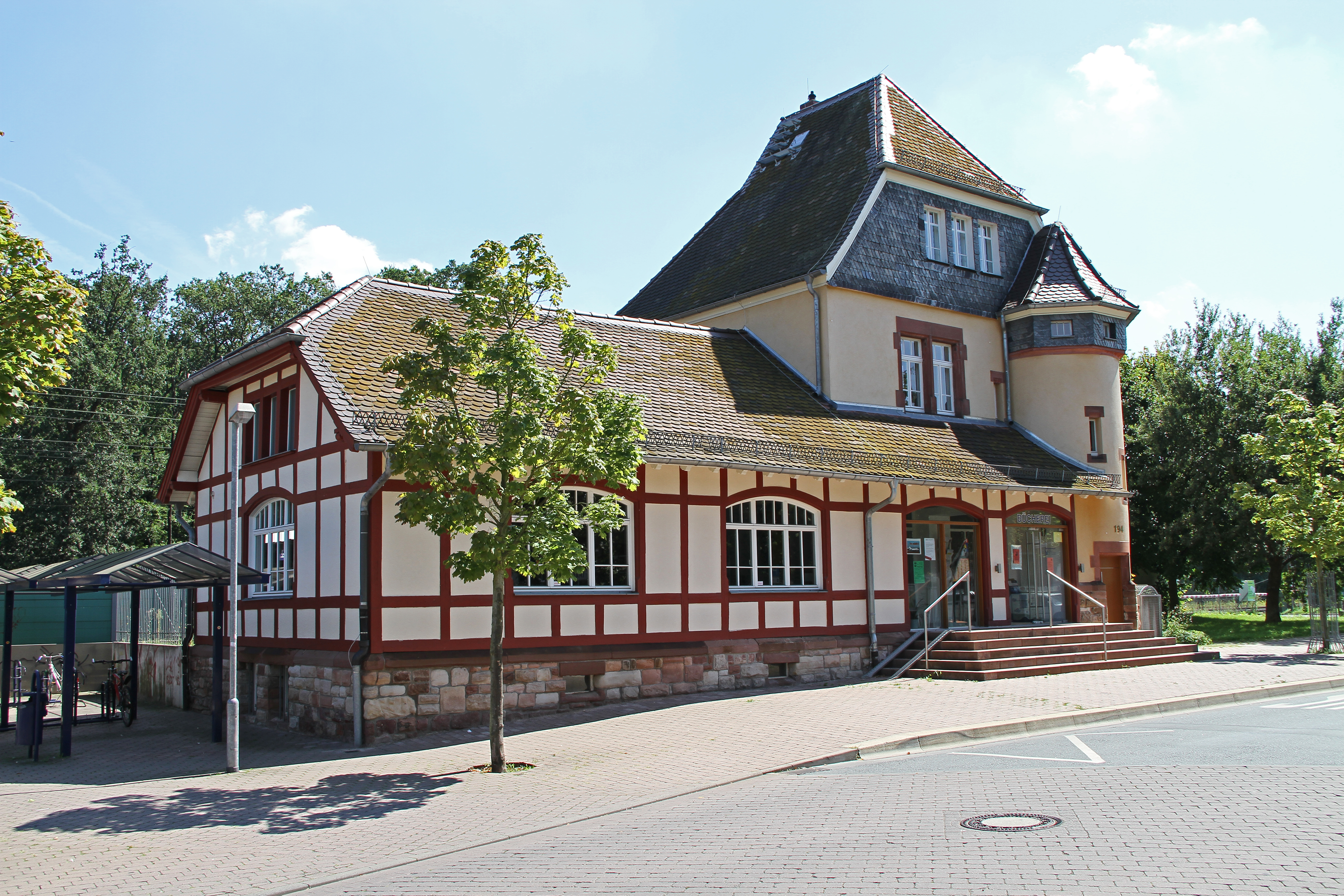
Erzhausen train station building, now a public library (the railway station itself is still active) (2010)

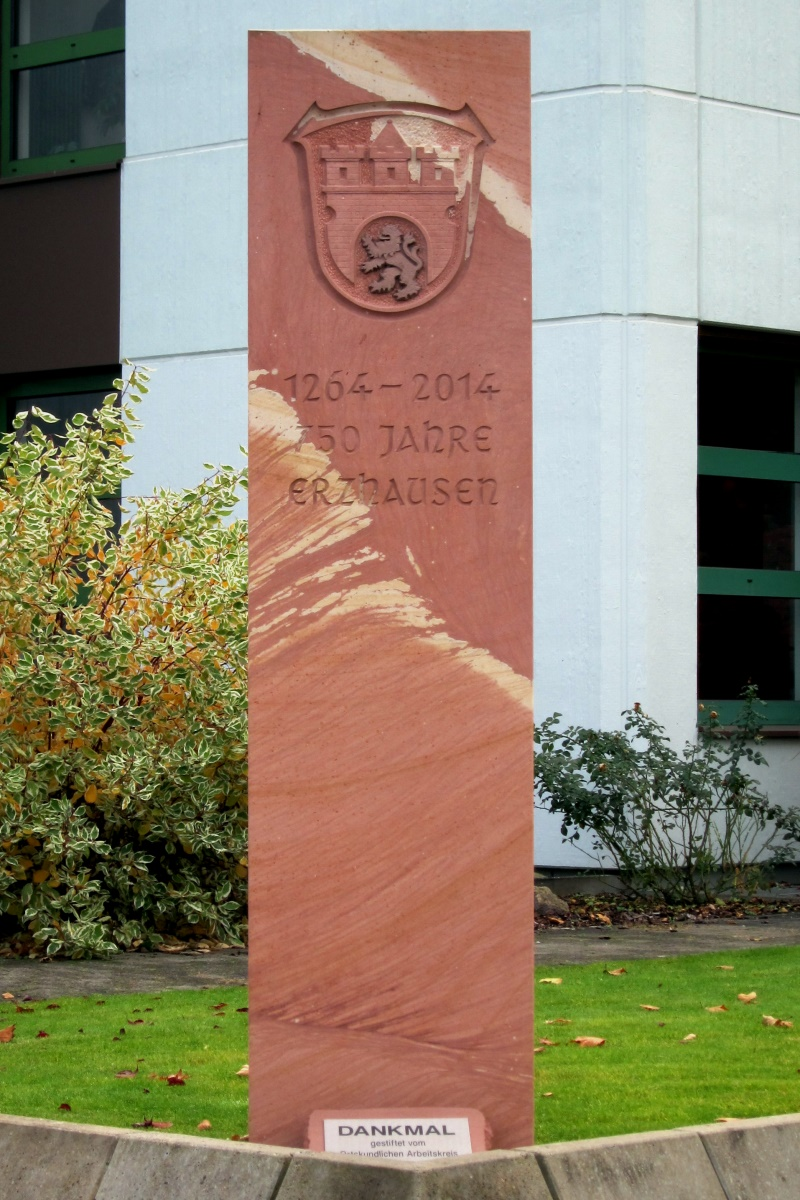
Monument Dankmal (2015)

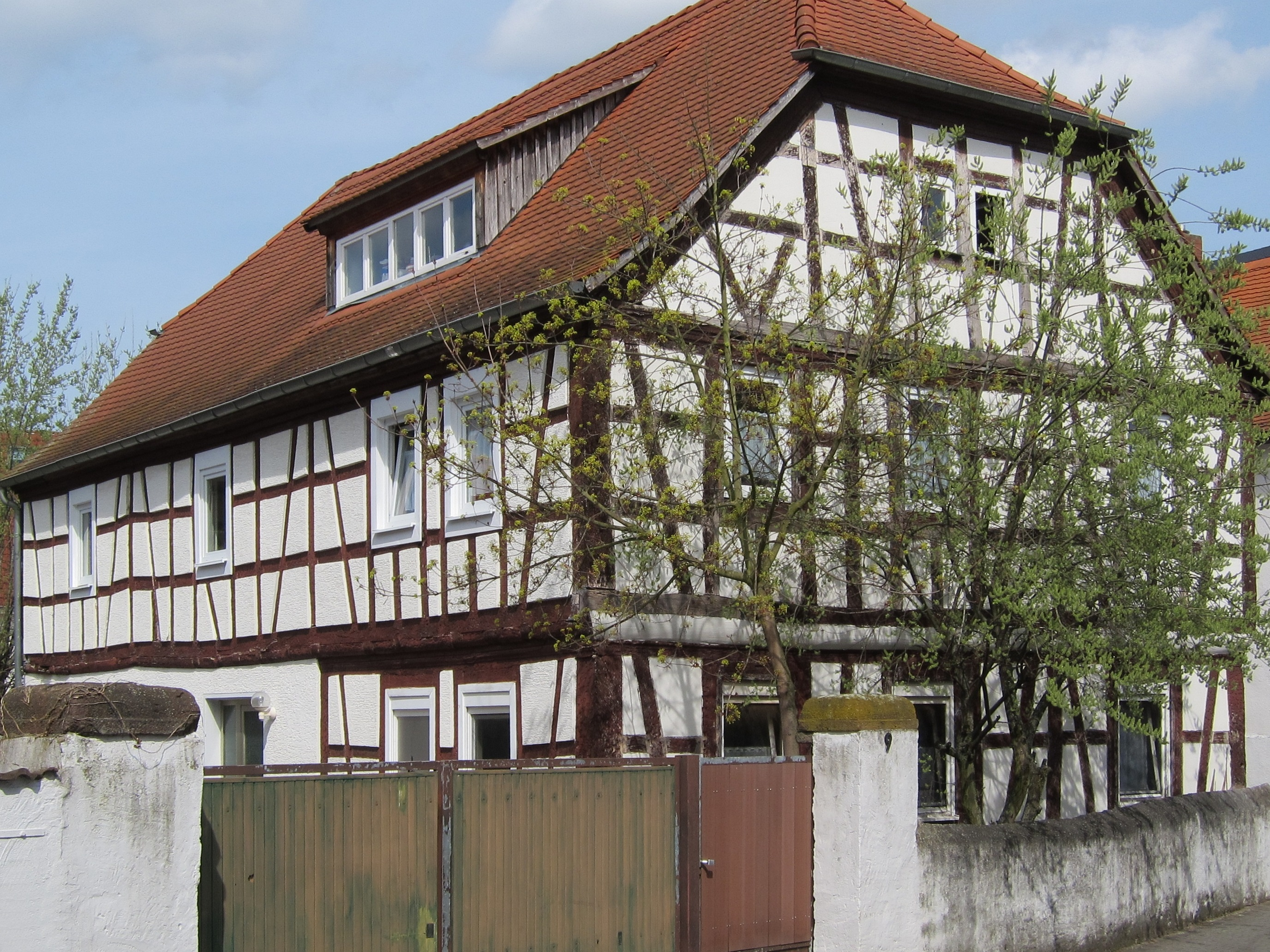
Half-timbered house (2015)

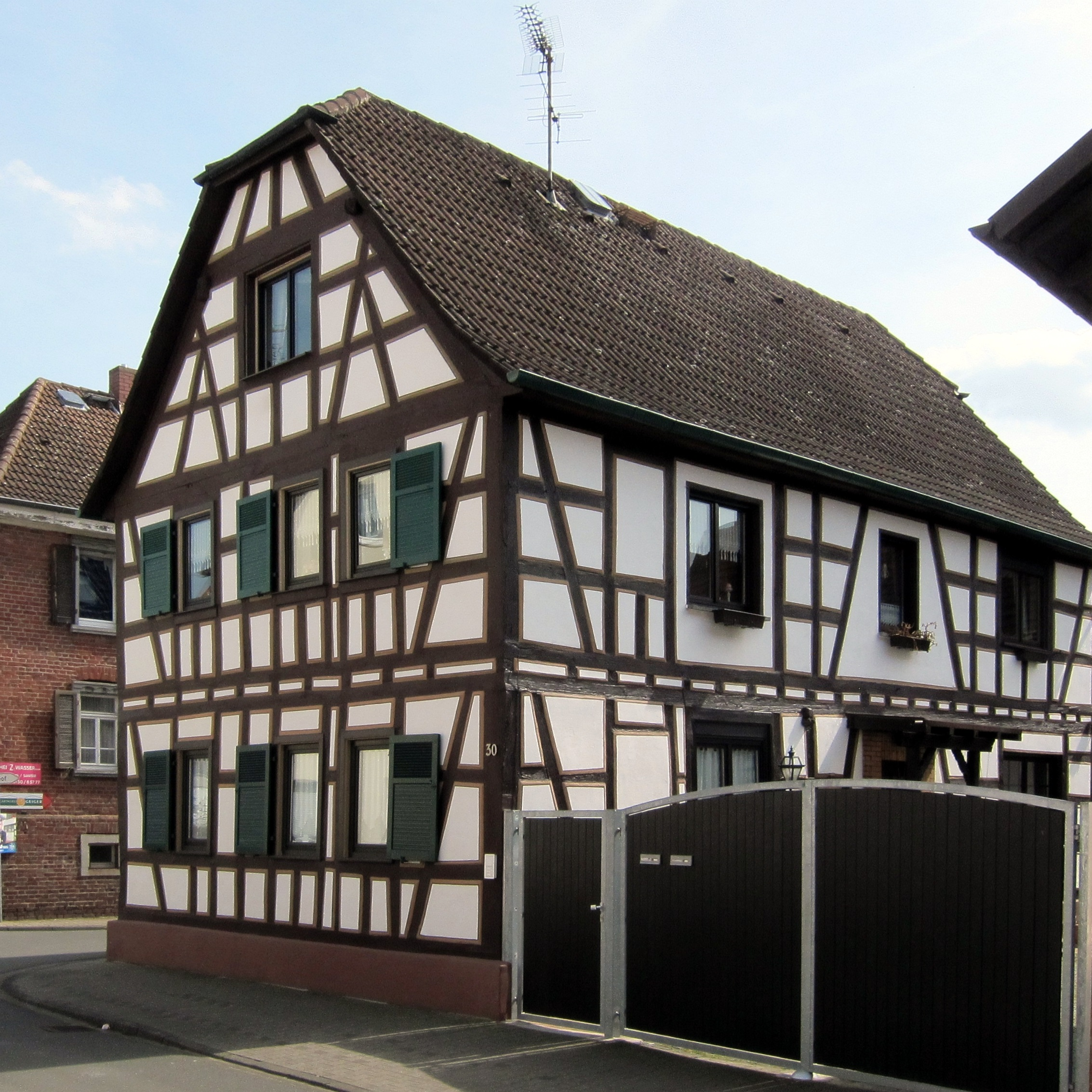
Half-timbered house (2015)

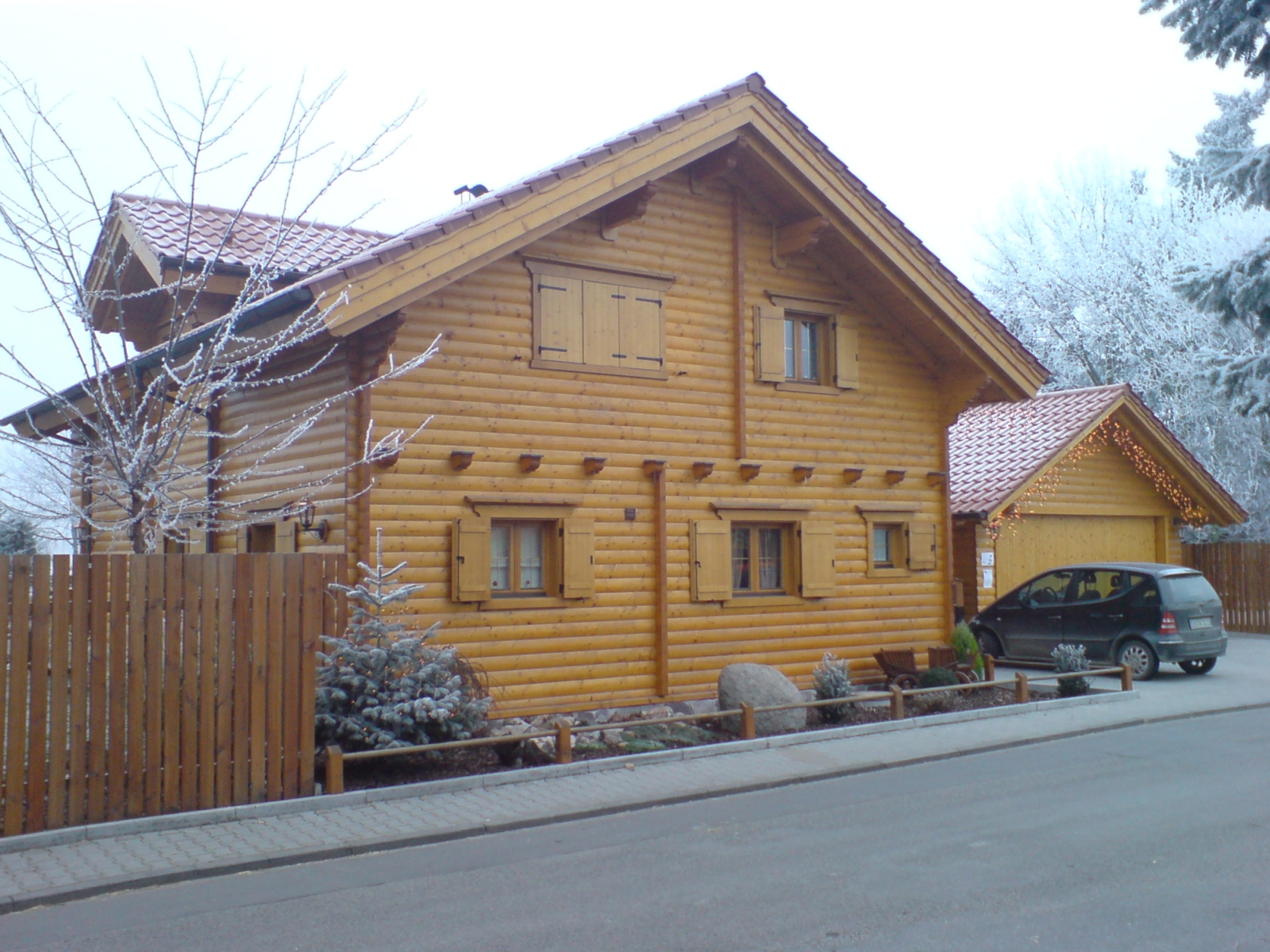
Wooden house (2007)

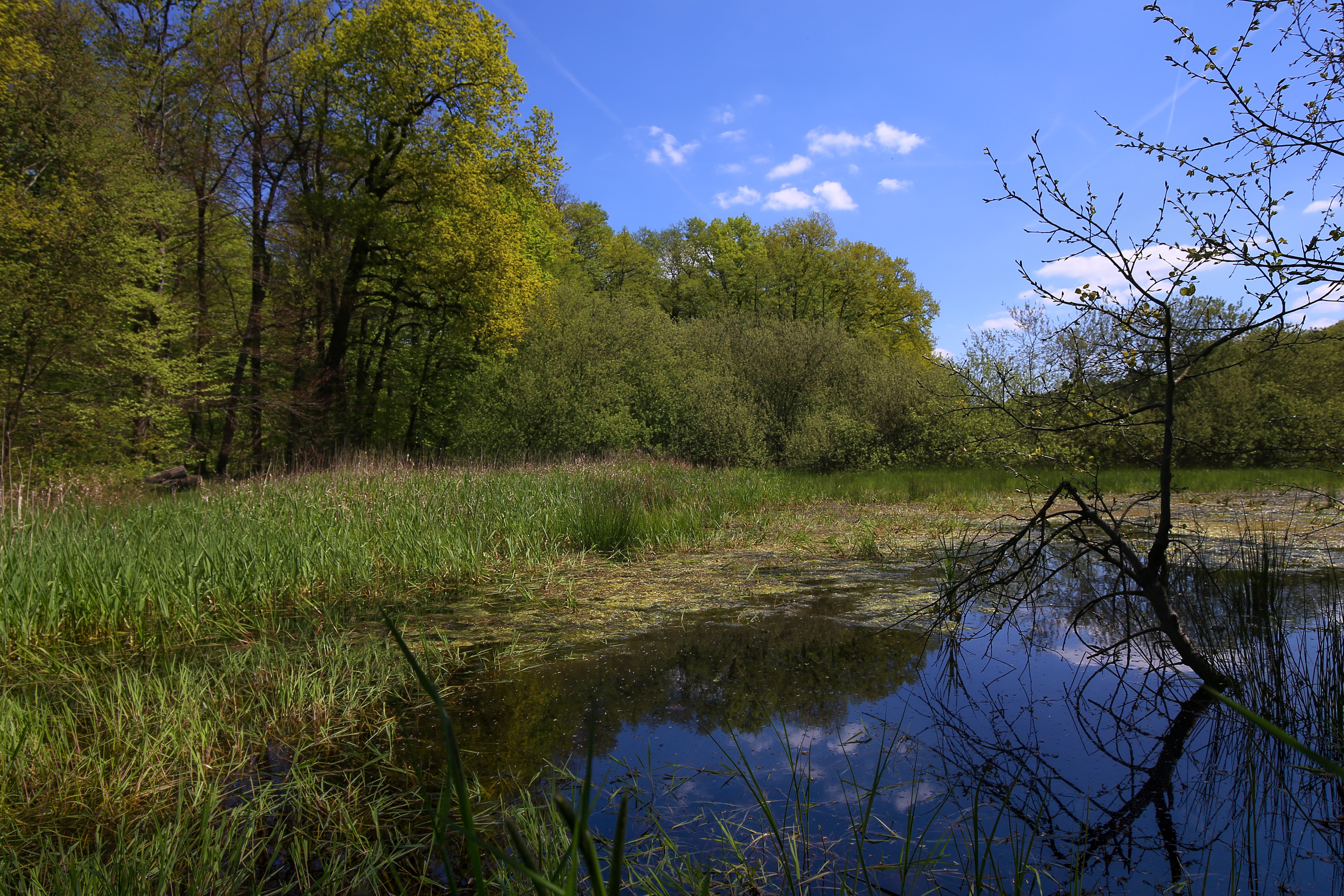
Nature reserve Faulbruch (2016)

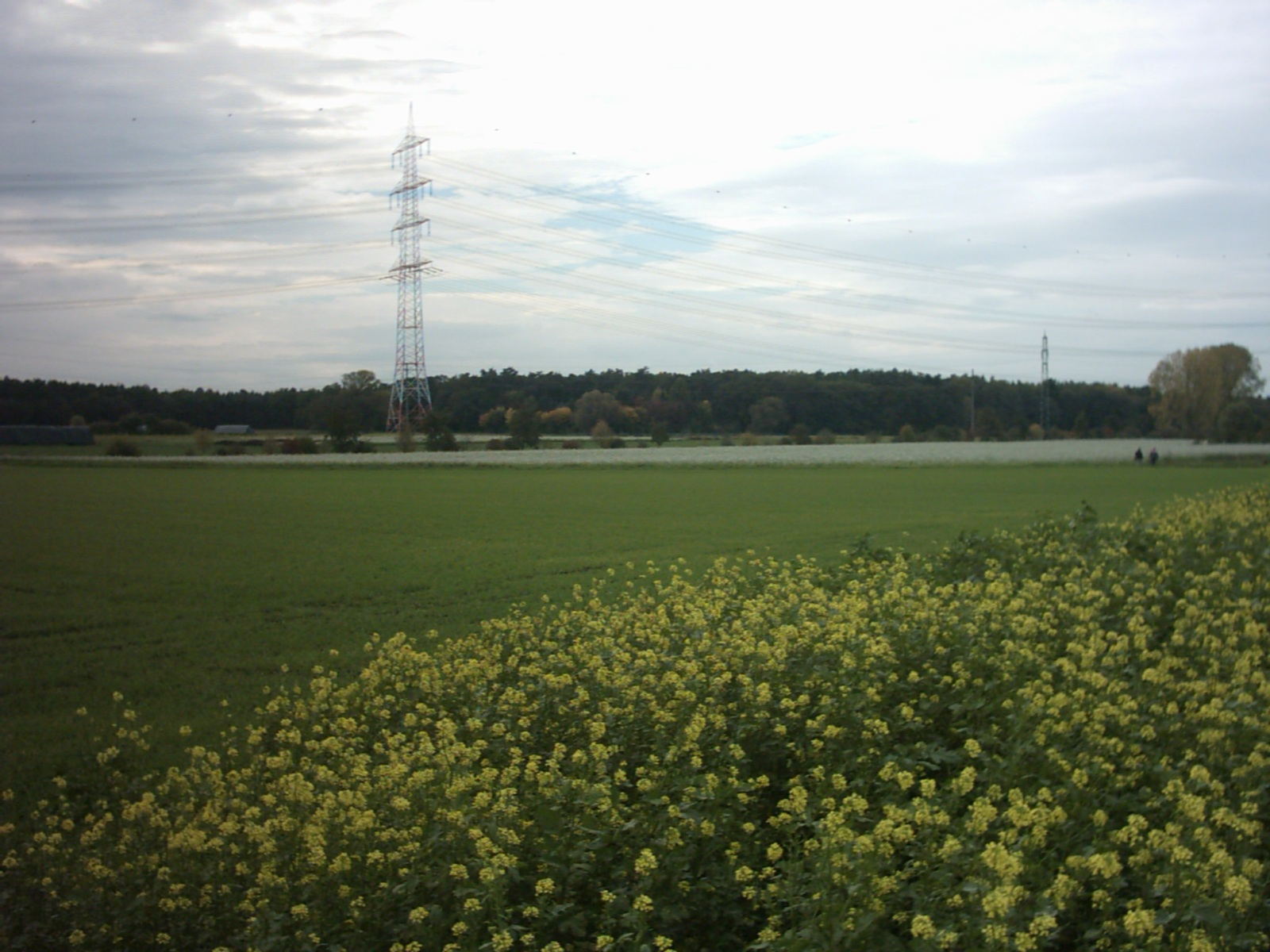
Fields south of Erzhausen, showing a typical South-Hesse countryside during autumn (2005)
