= Federation of Pentecostal Churches (Germany) =

- Bund Freikirchlicher Pfingstgemeinden K.d.ö.R.
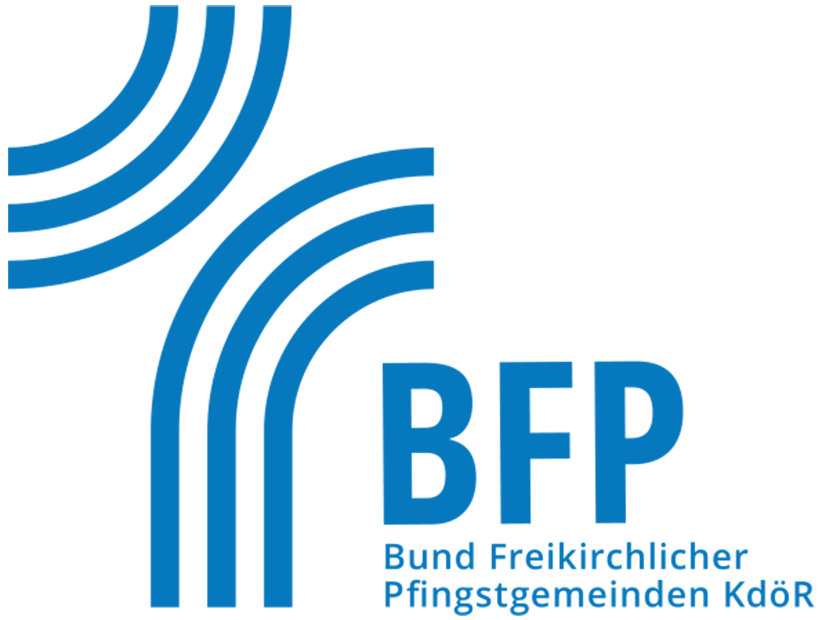
- Classification: Evangelical Christianity
- Orientation: Pentecostal
- Leadership: Presidium with chairman Friedhelm Holthuis
- Associations: Pentecostal European Fellowship, World Assemblies of God Fellowship
- Headquarters: Erzhausen, Germany
- Origin: 1954
- Congregations: 872 (January 2022)
- Members: 64,807 (January 2022)
- Seminaries: Theological Seminary Erzhausen
- Official website: bfp.de

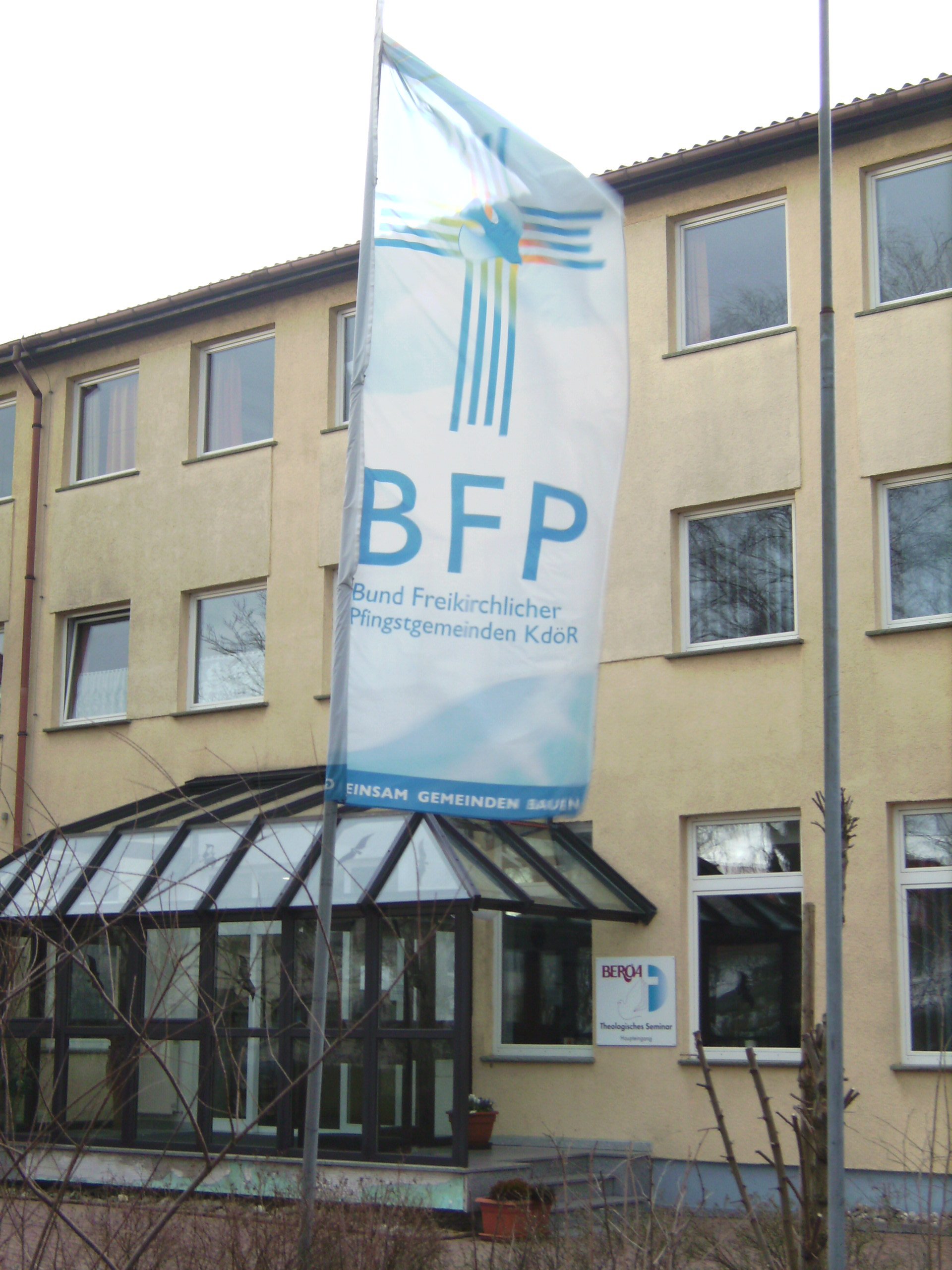
Theological Seminary Erzhausen

The Federation of Pentecostal Churches (German: Bund Freikirchlicher Pfingstgemeinden, abbreviated BFP) is a Pentecostal Christian denomination in Germany. With 64,807 members in 2022, it is the largest association of affiliated Pentecostal Denominations in Germany and is the German branch of the Assemblies of God.

== History ==
Pentecostalism first came to Germany in 1906–1908, but the BFP was founded in 1954 as the Association of Christian Churches in Germany (Arbeitsgemeinschaft der Christengemeinden in Deutschland, ACD). It changed to its current name in 1982. There is a seminary of the German Federation of Pentecostal Churches in the town of Erzhausen: Theologisches Seminar Erzhausen, originally named Bible School Beröa.
