= Assemblies of God =

Group of autonomous national groupings of churches

World Assemblies of God
- Classification: Protestant
- Orientation: Pentecostal
- Theology: Finished Work Pentecostal; Full Gospel
- Governance: Cooperative body
- Chairman: Dominic Yeo
- Region: 190 countries
- Origin: 1914 (WAGF formally established 1989)
- Separated from: Church of God in Christ, Christian and Missionary Alliance, and various other denominations, including those of Reformed and Baptist traditions.
- Merger of: Several Pentecostal groups
- Separations: General Assembly of Apostolic Assemblies, The Foursquare Church
- Congregations: 451,512
- Members: 69–88.9 million
- Missionary organization: WAGF Missions Commission
- Aid organization: World Assemblies of God Relief and Development Agency
- Official website: https://worldagfellowship.org/

The World Assemblies of God Fellowship (WAGF), commonly known as the Assemblies of God (AG), is a global cooperative body or communion of over 170 Pentecostal denominations that was established on August 15, 1989. It was founded on the initiative of the Assemblies of God USA, the largest Pentecostal group in the United States. The WAGF was created to provide structure so that member denominations, which previously related to each other informally, could more easily cooperate on a global basis.

The organizational committee, in 1988 summarized the purposes for the WAGF: to promote and facilitate world evangelization; coordinate world relief; coordinate the use of media and other technological resources to promote the cause of Jesus in a way pleasing to him; provide a strong international platform to speak out on behalf of the suffering and persecuted churches; coordinate theological education; and produce an international directory of Pentecostal churches, missions and other Pentecostal agencies to help share information. Member denominations are independent and autonomous, but they are united by shared beliefs and history.

== History ==
=== Origins ===
WAGF member denominations have varied histories. Most have roots in the interracial Azusa Street Revival in Los Angeles, California or other Pentecostal revivals around the world in the early twentieth century. The largest member denomination, Assembleia de Deus in Brazil, dates its beginning to 1911. Initially called Missão de Fé Apostólica (Apostolic Faith Mission), it changed its name in 1918 to Assembleia de Deus.

The Assemblies of God USA, organized in April 1914, was the first Pentecostal denomination to name itself Assemblies of God. The Assemblies of God USA was founded by about 300 preachers and laymen from 20 states and several foreign countries met for a general council in Hot Springs, Arkansas, United States. While most other U.S. Pentecostal denominations were regionally defined, the Assemblies of God claimed a broad nationwide constituency.

A new fellowship emerged from the meeting and was incorporated under the name General Council of the Assemblies of God in the United States of America.

In time, self-governing and self-supporting general councils broke off from the original fellowship or formed independently in several nations throughout the world, originating either from indigenous Pentecostal movements or as a direct result of the indigenous missions strategy of the General Council. In 1919, Pentecostals in Canada united to form the Pentecostal Assemblies of Canada, which formally affiliated with the Assemblies of God USA the following year. The Assemblies of God in Great Britain formed in 1924 and would have an early influence on the Assemblies of God in Australia, now known as Australian Christian Churches. The Australian Assemblies of God formed in 1937 through a merger of the Pentecostal Church of Australia and the Assemblies of God Queensland. The Queensland AG had formed in 1929; though, it was never formally affiliated with the AG in America. The Assemblies of God of South Africa, founded in 1925, like the AG Queensland was also not initially aligned with the US fellowship.

Before 1967, the Assemblies of God USA, along with the majority of other Pentecostal denominations, officially opposed Christian participation in war and considered itself a peace church. The US Assemblies of God continues to give full doctrinal support to members who are led by religious conscience to pacifism.

=== International fellowship ===
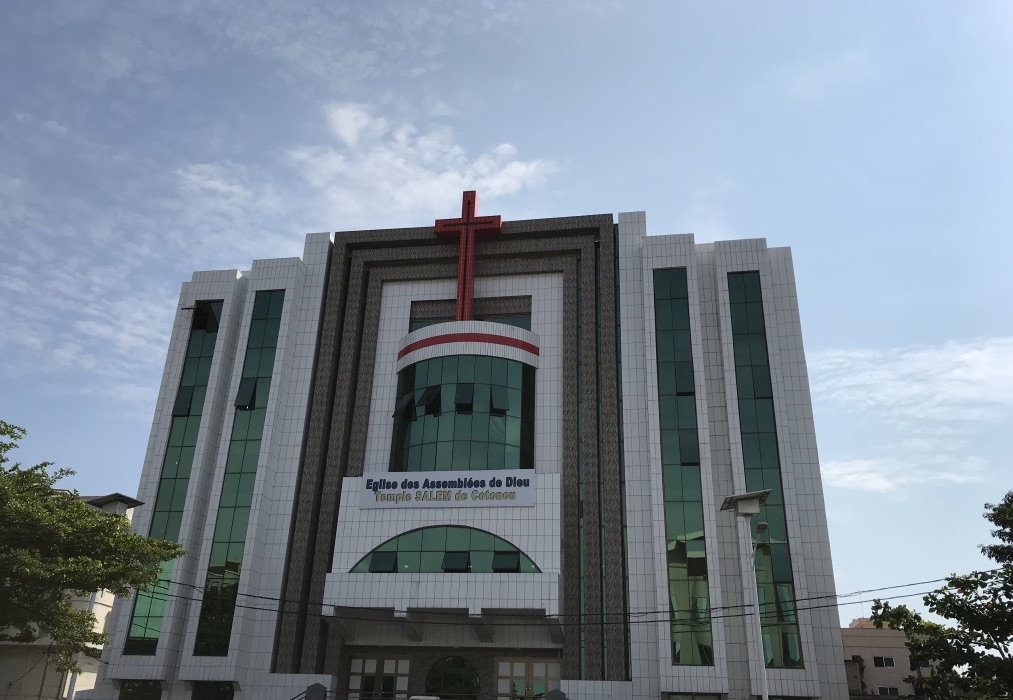
Salem Temple of Cotonou, affiliated with the Assemblies of God, Cotonou, Benin

Through foreign missionary work and establishing relationships with other Pentecostal churches, the Assemblies of God expanded into a worldwide movement. It was not until 1989 that the world fellowship was formed.

In 1989, the various Assemblies of God national fellowships united to form the World Pentecostal Assemblies of God Fellowship at the initiative of Dr. J. Philip Hogan, then executive director of the Division of Foreign Missions of the Assemblies of God in the United States. The initial purpose was to coordinate evangelism, but soon developed into a more permanent organism of inter-relation.

Dr. Hogan was elected the first chairman of the Fellowship and served until 1992 when Rev. David Yonggi Cho was elected chairman. In 1993, the name of the Fellowship was changed to the World Assemblies of God Fellowship. In 2000, Thomas E. Trask was elected to succeed Cho. At the 2008 World Congress in Lisbon, Portugal, George O. Wood, General Superintendent of the Assemblies of God in the United States, was elected chairman. At the 2011 World AG Congress in Chennai, India, David Mohan, General Superintendent of the All India Assemblies of God, was elected vice chairman. Dominic Yeo of the Assemblies of God in Singapore was elected chairman in 2023.

== Statistics ==
The denomination has between 67 and 89 million members worldwide according to various reports by the Assemblies of God. According to a census published by the association in 2025, it has 451,512 churches and 88.9 million members and adherents worldwide. In 2022, the Assemblies of God reported that it had 69 million adherents worldwide. In 2020, the World Christian Database and World Christian Encyclopedia, published by Edinburgh University Press, reported the Assemblies of God claimed 67 million affiliated members. In 2013, the Assemblies of God had claimed 66 million adherents according to The Christian Century.

== Beliefs ==
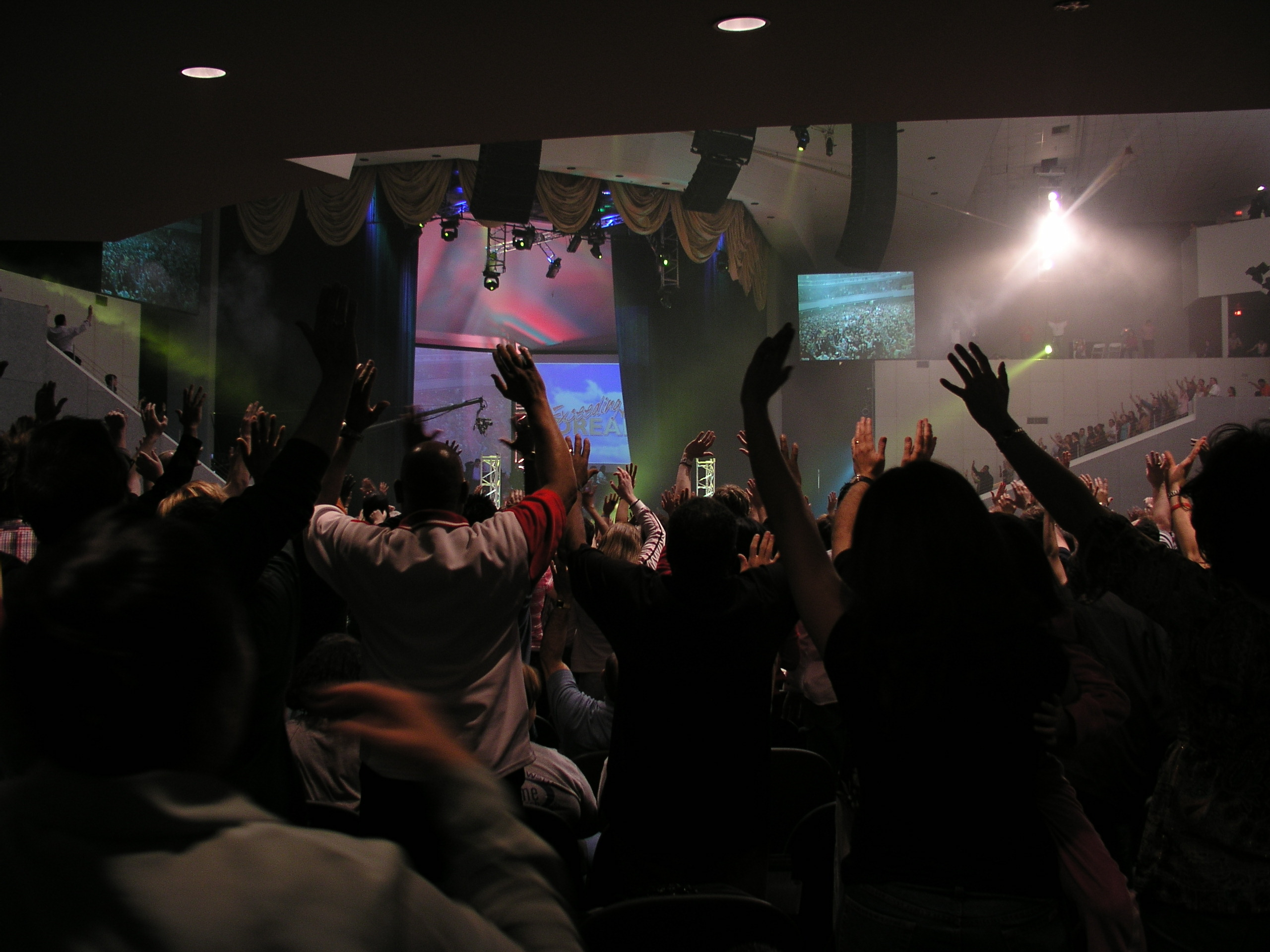
Worship service at Dream City Church, affiliated with the Assemblies of God USA, in 2007, in Phoenix, Arizona, United States

The doctrinal position of the Assemblies of God is framed in a classical Pentecostal and evangelical context. The AG is Trinitarian. It believes that the Bible is divinely inspired and the infallible authoritative rule of faith and conduct. Baptism by immersion is practiced as an ordinance instituted by Christ for those who have been saved. Baptism is understood as an outward sign of an inward change from being dead in sin to being alive in Christ. As an ordinance, Communion is also practiced. The AG believes that the elements that are partaken are symbols which express the sharing of the divine nature of Jesus of Nazareth; a memorial of His suffering and death; and a prophecy of His second coming. The Assemblies of God also strongly emphasizes the fulfillment of the Great Commission and believes this is the church's calling.

As classical Pentecostals, the Assemblies of God believes all Christians are entitled to and should seek baptism in the Holy Spirit. The AG teaches that this experience is distinct from and subsequent to the experience of salvation. Baptism in the Holy Spirit empowers the believer for Christian life and service. The initial evidence of baptism in the Holy Spirit is speaking in tongues "as the Spirit gives utterance" (Acts 2:4). It also believes in the present-day use of other spiritual gifts such as divine healing.

The Assemblies of God ordains women as pastors, which differentiates them from most other evangelical churches. Pentecostal and Charismatic denominations have traditionally allowed women to serve in pastoral ministry.

While the World AG Fellowship has a statement of faith that outlines the basic beliefs that unify the various branches of the movement, each national AG denomination formulates its own doctrinal statements. The Assemblies of God USA, for example, adheres to the Statement of Fundamental Truths.

== Politics ==
The most prominent politician within the Assemblies of God is former Australian prime minister Scott Morrison. He has said, "the Bible is not a policy handbook, and I get very worried when people try to treat it like one". In late 2017, Morrison said he would become a stronger advocate for protections for religious freedom.

In Brazil, the local branch Assembleias de Deus has had an increasing influence on politics throughout the early 21st century. The Christian fundamentalist party Patriota was in a parliamental coalition with the Bolsonaro government as well as the centre-right Partido Social Cristão, which was then led by two AG pastors, Everaldo Pereira and Marco Feliciano, who were accused in various cases of crime and sexual misconduct. Everaldo was arrested for his participation in a corruption scheme in the state-owned company of water treatment of the State of Rio de Janeiro, Companhia Estadual de Águas e Esgotos do Rio de Janeiro; Feliciano proved his innocence and that he was a victim of a conspiracy planned by former PSC member Patricia Lelis, who was charged with false reporting and extortion before fleeing to the United States, where she was again charged and arrested for the same crime.

Another Brazilian politician and AG member, Marina Silva, pursues ecologist ideas and supports the rights of the indigenous tribes of her country. The church leadership has criticized Silva's leftist stances on many issues, such as drug reform.

Within the United States of America, the majority of its membership vote or lean Republican. During Donald Trump's first presidency (from 2017 to 2021), General Superintendent George O. Wood attended the National Day of Prayer and praised an executive order allowing ministers and religious organizations to support and advocate for political candidates.

== Organization ==
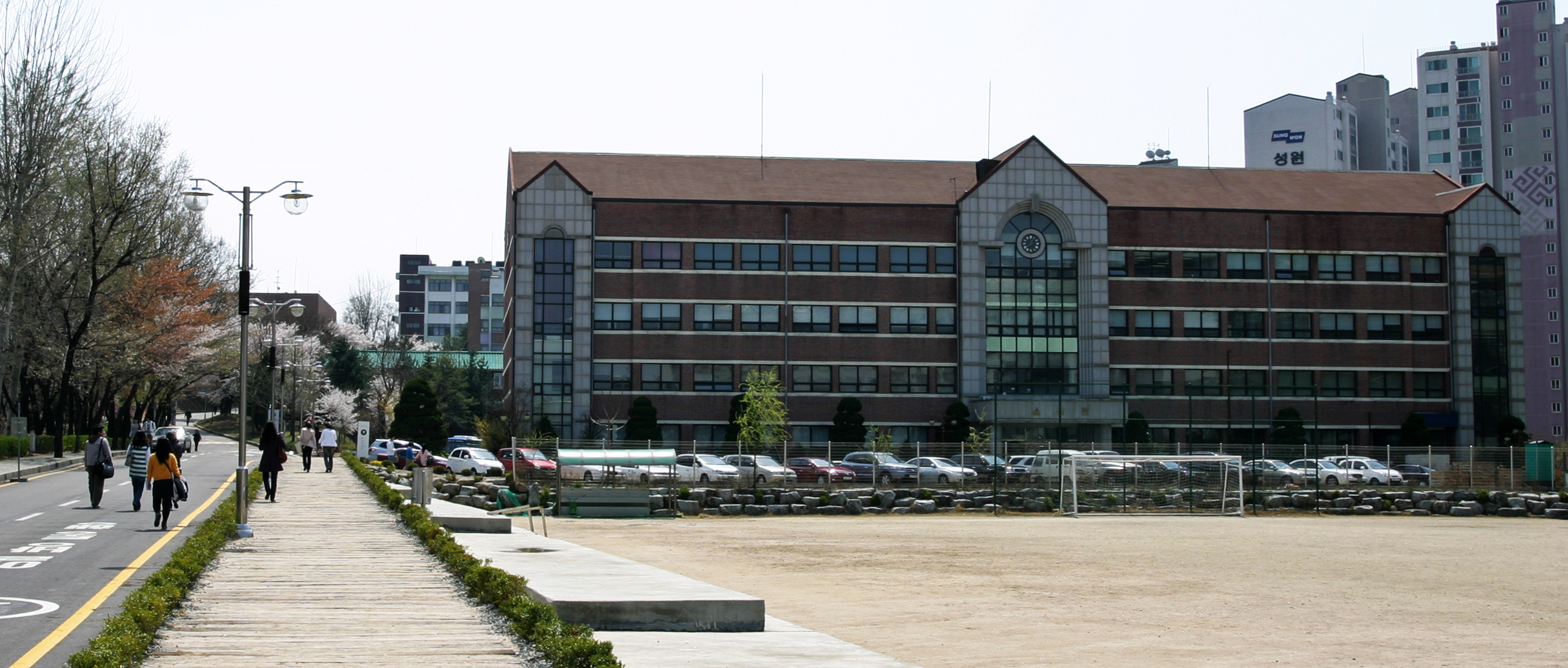
Hansei University at Gunpo, South Korea

The World Fellowship unites Assemblies of God national councils from around the world together for cooperation. Each national council is fully self-governing and independent and involvement with the World Fellowship does not limit this independence. The work of the World Fellowship is carried out by the Executive Council. Executive Council members represent different regions of the world and serve three-year terms. Africa, Asia Pacific, Latin America/Caribbean, and North America each have four representatives, Europe has three, and the Middle East and South Asia each have one. They are elected by the General Assembly. Each World Fellowship member is entitled to send one or more delegates to the General Assembly with one vote. The General Assembly also elects the Chairman, Vice Chairman, and Secretary of the World Fellowship. At both the national and lower level, the Assemblies of God are generally structured around a form of presbyterian polity, combining the independence of the local church with oversight by district and national councils.

The World Assemblies of God Relief Agency (WAGRA) directs its humanitarian work.

== Interdenominational dialogue ==
The Assemblies of God and the World Communion of Reformed Churches have engaged in a series of dialogue to better understand each other's theology.

== See also ==
- Assembleias de Deus (in Brazil)
- Assemblies of God USA
- Canadian Assemblies of God
- Pentecostal Assemblies of Canada
- List of Assemblies of God National Fellowships
- List of Assemblies of God schools
- List of Assemblies of God people
- World Evangelical Alliance
