= Friuli =

Historical region in northeast Italy

Coordinates: 46°10′N 13°00′E

Friuli Friûl (Friulian) Friul (Venetian) Furlanija (Slovene) Furlanija (Croatian)
- Historical region
- Flag of Friuli
- Anthem: Incuintri al doman
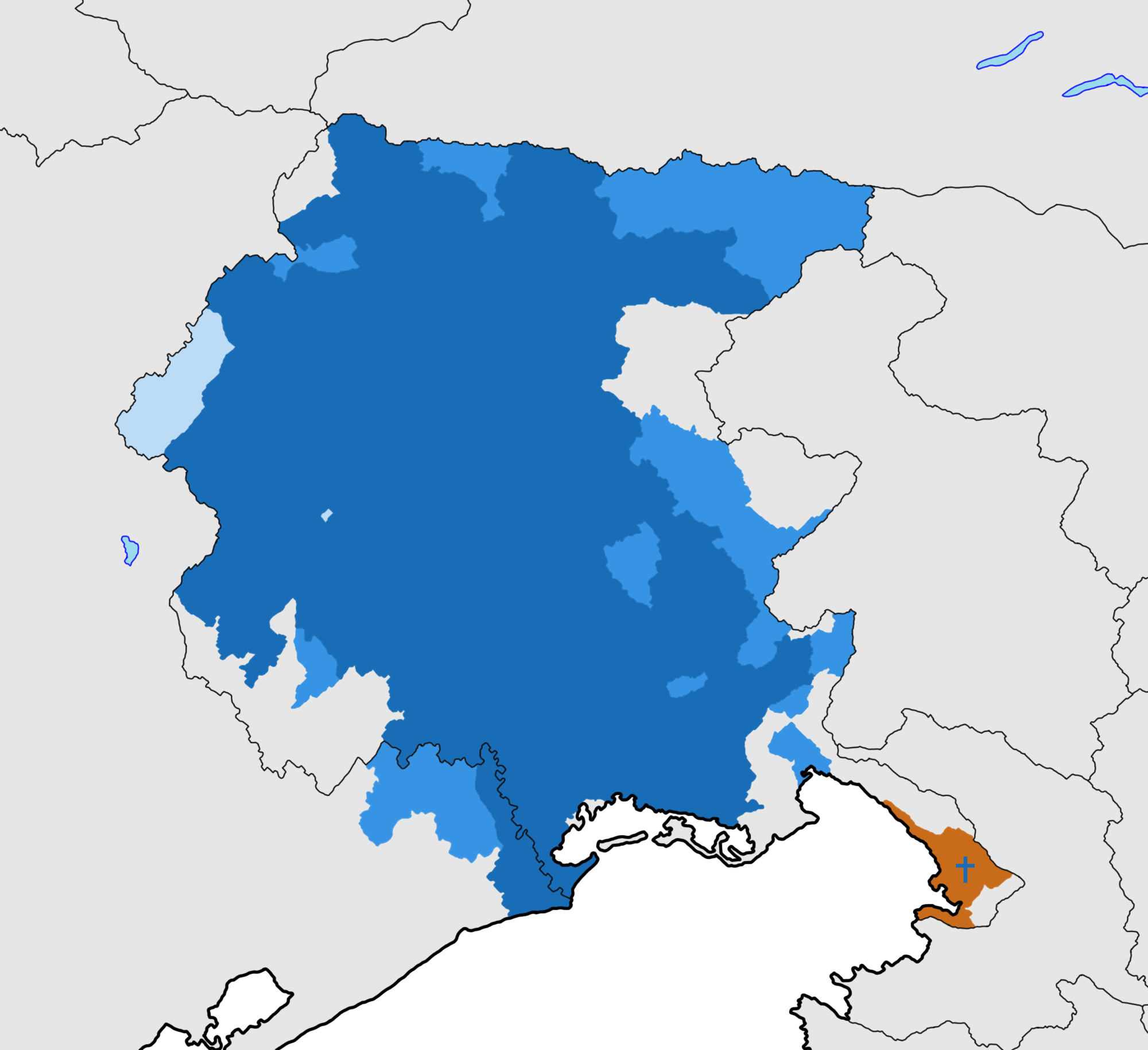
- Friulian language area superposed to the borders of Friuli-Venezia Giulia
- Country: Italy
- Region: Friuli-Venezia Giulia

Area
  - Total: 8,240 km^{2} (3,180 sq mi)

Population
  - Total: ~800,000–1,000,000
  - Density: 128/km^{2} (330/sq mi)
- Demonym(s): English: Friulian; Italian: Friulano (man); Italian: Friulana (woman); Friulian: Furlan (man); Friulian: Furlane (woman)
  - Summer (DST): UTC + 1

Friuli (Italian: [friˈuːli]; Friulian: Friûl [fɾiˈuːl]; Venetian: Friul or Friułi; Slovene: Furlanija; Austrian German: Friaul) is a historical region of northeast Italy. The region is marked by its separate regional and ethnic identity predominantly tied to the Friulians, who speak the Friulian language. It comprises the major part of the autonomous region Friuli-Venezia Giulia, i.e. the administrative provinces of Udine, Pordenone, and Gorizia, excluding Trieste.

== Names ==
The name originates from the ancient Roman town of Forum Iulii ("Julius' Forum"), now Cividale del Friuli.

== Geography ==
Friuli is bordered on the west by the Veneto region with the border running along the Livenza river, on the north by the crest of the Carnic Alps between Carnia and Austrian Carinthia, on the east by the Julian Alps, the border with Slovenia and the Timavo river, and on the south by the Adriatic Sea. The adjacent Slovene parts of the Soča/Isonzo valley from Gorizia/Nova Gorica up to Triglav and the Vipava Valley, forming the Goriška region, may also be considered part of historic Friuli.

The mountainous northern part of the region belongs to the Southern Limestone Alps. From west to east, the region's highest peaks are, in the Carnic Prealps (Dolomiti Friulane)—the Cima dei Preti, 2,703 metres (8,868 ft), Duranno 2,652 metres (8,701 ft), and Cridola 2,581 metres (8,468 ft); in the Carnic Alps—Peralba 2,694 metres (8,839 ft), Monte Bìvera 2,474 metres (8,117 ft) and Coglians 2,780 metres (9,120 ft); in the Julian Alps, the Jôf Fuârt 2,666 metres (8,747 ft), the Jôf di Montasio 2,754 metres (9,035 ft), Mangart 2,677 metres (8,783 ft), and Canin 2,587 metres (8,488 ft), which dominates the plain.

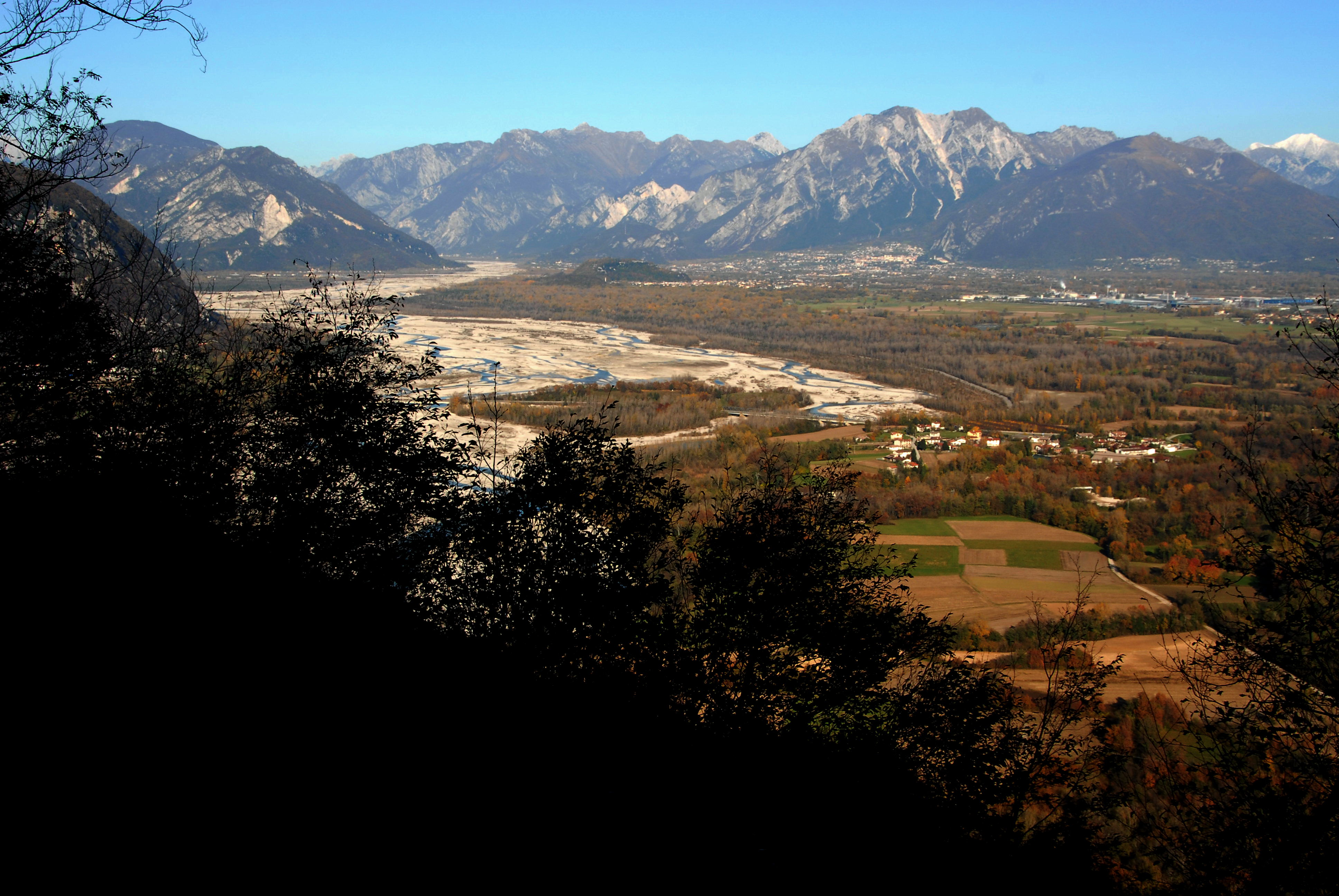
Tagliamento river at Gemona

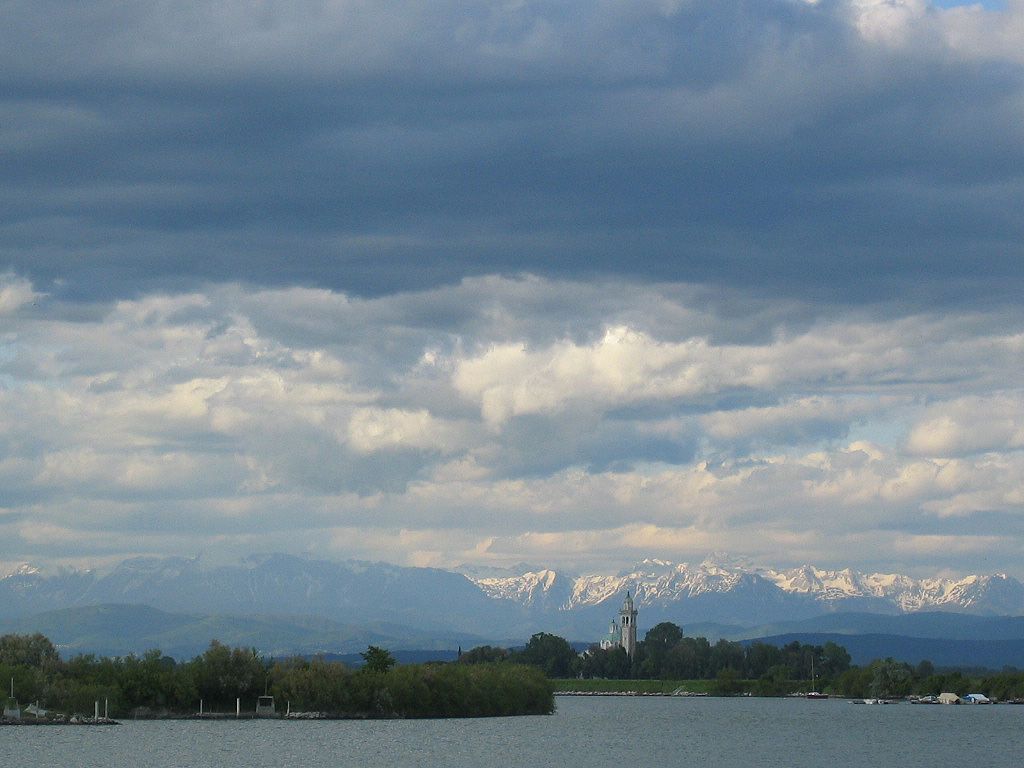
Lagoon of Grado, Alps in the background

Rivers flowing southwards from the mountains are numerous. The Friulian mountains surround the course of the Tagliamento river, which, at the latitude of Gemona del Friuli first crosses the hills that occupy the center of the Friuli, then flows into a large flood plain. This plain is commonly divided into the High Friulian plain and the Low Friulian plain (Bassa Friulana), whose boundary is the Napoleonic road that connects the cities of Codroipo and Palmanova. To the south of this road is the risorgive zone, where water resurfaces from underground waterways in spring-fed pools throughout the area. South of the plains lie the lagoons of Marano and Grado, which are nature reserves. Other important rivers include the Torre, Natisone, Stella, Isonzo/Soča, and Ausa.

Friuli covers an area of 8,240 square kilometres (3,180 mi^{2}), subdivided among the provinces of Udine 4,905 square kilometres (1,894 mi^{2}), Pordenone 2,178 square kilometres (841 mi^{2}) and Gorizia 466 square kilometres (180 mi^{2}). The historical capital and most important city is Udine, which was also the capital of the medieval Patria del Friuli. Other important towns are Pordenone, Gorizia/Nova Gorica, Sacile, Codroipo, Cervignano del Friuli, Cividale del Friuli, Gemona del Friuli, Monfalcone, and Tolmezzo.

== Climate ==
The climate of the Friulian plain is mainly humid subtropical. The climate in this area is suitable for growing white wine grapes, and 2.5% of wine produced in Italy comes from this part of the region. The hills, however, have a continental climate, and the mountainous regions have an alpine climate. On the coast the mean annual temperature is 14 °C (57 °F), while in the inner plains, the average is lowered to 13 to 13.5 °C (55.4 to 56.3 °F; Udine 13.1 °C (55.6 °F), Pordenone 13.3 °C (55.9 °F), Gorizia 13.4 °C (56.1 °F)). Further north, in Tolmezzo, the average temperature is approximately 10.6 °C (51.1 °F). The lowest values are recorded in the Alps: 4 °C (39 °F) at Passo di Monte Croce Carnico (at 1,300 metres / 4,300 ft) and between 5.5 and 7 °C (41.9–44.6 °F) in Val Canale, which is situated 850 metres (2,790 ft) above sea level. In the coldest month, January, temperatures vary between approximately 4.5 °C (40.1 °F) in Monfalcone and nearly −5 °C (23 °F) in Passo di Monte Croce Carnico, with intermediate temperatures of 3 °C (37 °F) in Udine and −2 or −3 °C (28 or 27 °F) in Valcanale. Gorizia, a short distance from Udine, enjoys a particularly milder micro-climate with its approximate annual average of 4 °C (39 °F). In the warmest month, July, the temperatures range between 22.5 and 24 °C (72.5–75.2 °F) along the coast and plains and between 14 and 16 °C (57–61 °F) in Val Canale.

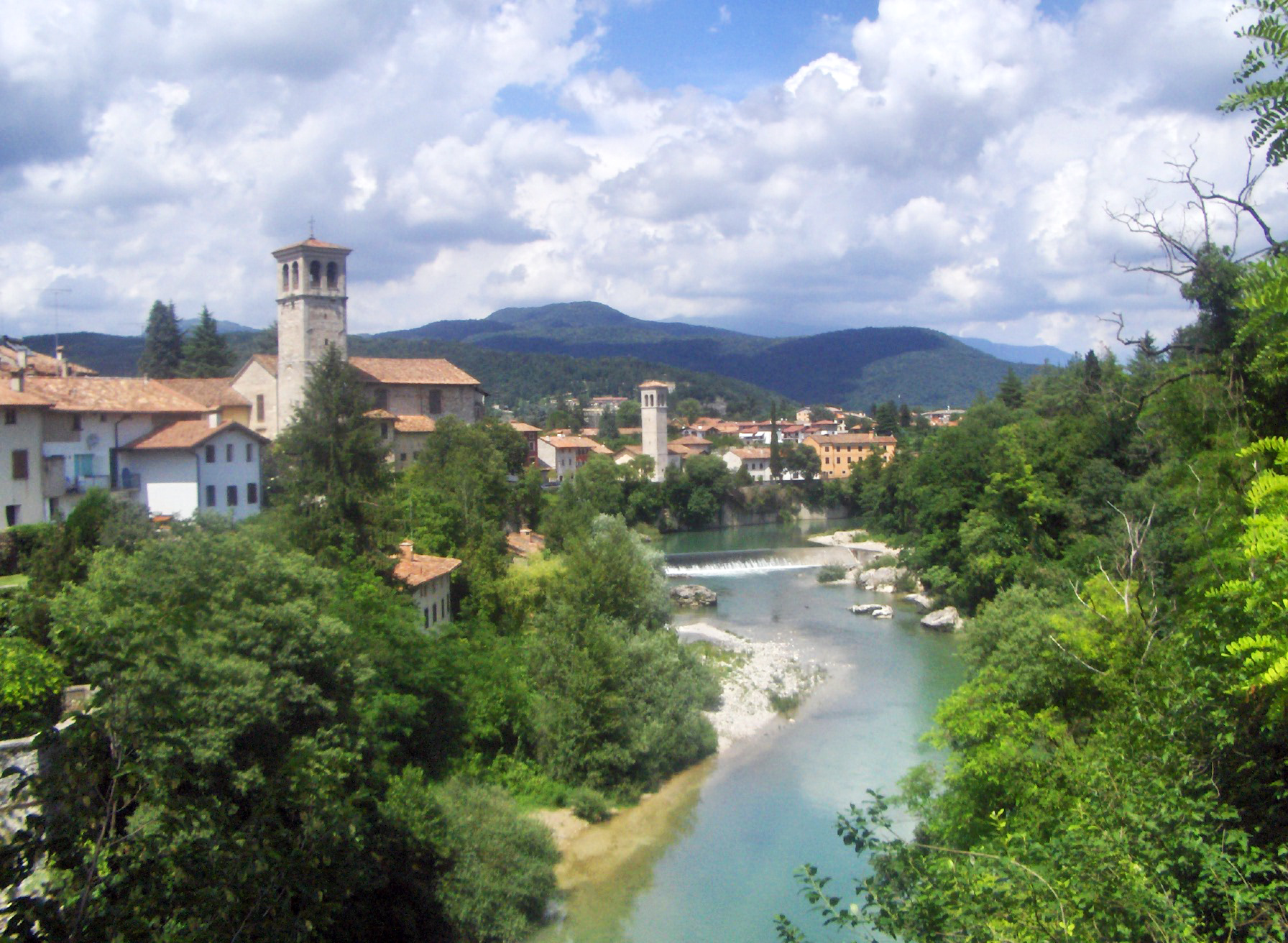
Cividale on Natisone river

Precipitation in Friuli is relatively abundant; the distribution of rainfall varies a great deal during the course of the year. Minimum values in the southern part generally fall between 1,200 and 1,500 mm (47–59 in) (Gorizia over 1,350 mm (53 in) and Udine over 1,400 mm (55 in)), whereas the alpine area's maximum annual rainfall is approximately 3,000 mm (120 in). The Julian Prealps is one of Italy's rainiest regions: Musi receives about 3,300 mm (130 in) of annual precipitation, sometimes even 5000 mm, and can receive 400 mm (16 in) in a single month. In some areas of Friuli, excessive rainfall has caused erosion and the flooding of many rivers. Snow is sparse in the southern plains (3 or 4 snowy days each year in Udine and Pordenone) but falls more consistently further to the north (Val Canale 25 days, Sauris 23 days, and Passo di Monte Croce Carnico 28 days).

The following weatherbox is from Udine, the main city of Friuli.

Climate data for Udine (1971–2000, extremes 1969–present)
Month	Jan	Feb	Mar	Apr	May	Jun	Jul	Aug	Sep	Oct	Nov	Dec	Year
Record high °C (°F)	18.6 (65.5)	23.2 (73.8)	25.6 (78.1)	29.5 (85.1)	33.2 (91.8)	36.2 (97.2)	38.2 (100.8)	37.0 (98.6)	34.4 (93.9)	29.8 (85.6)	25.3 (77.5)	17.4 (63.3)	38.2 (100.8)
Mean daily maximum °C (°F)	7.7 (45.9)	9.8 (49.6)	13.5 (56.3)	17.1 (62.8)	22.3 (72.1)	25.6 (78.1)	28.2 (82.8)	28.4 (83.1)	24.1 (75.4)	18.6 (65.5)	12.6 (54.7)	8.5 (47.3)	18.0 (64.4)
Daily mean °C (°F)	3.7 (38.7)	5.0 (41.0)	8.4 (47.1)	12.0 (53.6)	17.1 (62.8)	20.3 (68.5)	22.7 (72.9)	22.6 (72.7)	18.7 (65.7)	13.7 (56.7)	8.2 (46.8)	4.5 (40.1)	13.1 (55.6)
Mean daily minimum °C (°F)	−0.4 (31.3)	0.3 (32.5)	3.4 (38.1)	7.0 (44.6)	11.8 (53.2)	15.0 (59.0)	17.1 (62.8)	16.9 (62.4)	13.3 (55.9)	8.8 (47.8)	3.7 (38.7)	0.5 (32.9)	8.1 (46.6)
Record low °C (°F)	−14.6 (5.7)	−11.6 (11.1)	−10.0 (14.0)	−4.8 (23.4)	1.4 (34.5)	5.6 (42.1)	8.2 (46.8)	6.6 (43.9)	3.0 (37.4)	−3.2 (26.2)	−8.4 (16.9)	−18.6 (−1.5)	−18.6 (−1.5)
Average precipitation mm (inches)	74.9 (2.95)	61.6 (2.43)	86.2 (3.39)	119.0 (4.69)	118.2 (4.65)	137.9 (5.43)	81.2 (3.20)	79.1 (3.11)	124.3 (4.89)	134.5 (5.30)	108.1 (4.26)	85.9 (3.38)	1,210.9 (47.67)
Average precipitation days (≥ 1.0 mm)	6.2	5.2	7.6	9.8	10.8	10.5	7.8	7.2	7.3	8.3	7.2	6.7	94.6
Source: Servizio Meteorologico

== Demography ==
Friuli, Mandament of Portogruaro included, is inhabited by over 1,000,000 people.

Zona	Population (2005)	Land area (km^{2})	Population density (inhabitants/km^{2})
Province of Gorizia	140,681	466	302
Province of Udine	528,246	4,905	108
Province of Pordenone	297,699	2,178	137
Total	966,626	7,549	128

One of the most important demographic phenomena in Friuli was emigration. It began in the final decades of the 19th century and ended in the 1970s. It is estimated that more than a million Friulian people emigrated away over a period of approximately one hundred years. According to the most recent census by AIRE (2005), Friulian émigrés living abroad number 134,936. Of these, 56.0% reside in Europe, 24.0% in South America, 10.3% in North America and 4.7% in Oceania. This data only reflects those Friulians and their descendants who have Italian citizenship. The descendants of Friulians are excluded from the census because they are not Italian citizens. Friulians in the world have supported cultural associations called Fogolârs furlans, of which there are 46 in Italy and 156 in the rest of the world.

== History ==
=== Origins and the Roman era ===
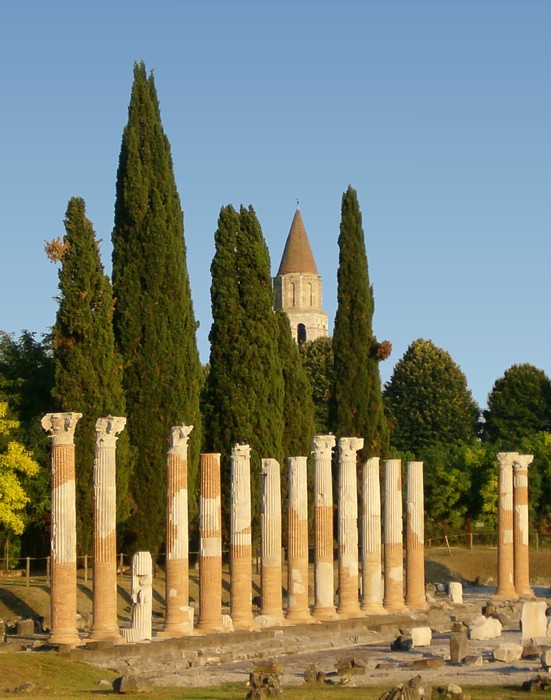
Roman forum ruins in Aquileia, which played an important role in Roman times and the early Middle Ages when it became seat of the Patriarchate of Aquileia

In the prehistoric era, Friuli was home to the Castellieri culture and the Raeti. These peoples were the dominant culture in the area from about the 15th century BC until the early historical period. During the course of the 4th century BC Friuli was also settled by the Carni (in ancient Greek Καρνίοι), a tribe of unknown ethnicity which may have spoken a Celtic, a Venetic or a Rhaetic language, and which introduced advanced techniques of working iron and silver. According to Strabo [4.6] the Carni inhabited "the country about the Adriatic Gulf and Aquileia" and both Pliny [3.22(18)] and Ptolemy [3.1] ascribe Aquileia, Concordia and Forum Julii to belong to the "towns of the Carni" in the "country of the Carni". The Carni worshiped the deity Belenus which is attested by the most numerous votive inscriptions found in and around Aquileia. A northern mountainous area of Friuli still retains the ancient name Carnia.

Beginning from the 2nd century BC, Friuli was colonized by the Romans: Aquileia was the fourth largest city of Italy during Roman imperial times, capital of Regio X of the Italia province (the Augustan region Venetia et Histria). The city was the most important river port on the Natissa river, dominating trade between the Adriatic Sea and northern Europe (carried over the Via Iulia Augusta road). Aquileia owed its importance to the strategic position it has on the Adriatic sea and its proximity to the Alps. This location allowing Rome to intercept barbarian invasions from the East. Julius Caesar quartered his legions in Aquileia during winter. The development of other centers, such as Forum Iulii (Cividale del Friuli) and Iulium Carnicum (Zuglio), contributed to the increase in economic and cultural wealth of Friuli until the first barbarian incursions, at the beginning of the 5th century. In the final decades of the 3rd century, Aquileia became the center of one of the most prestigious bishoprics of the empire, competing in Italy with Milan and, subsequently, Ravenna, for second place to Rome. A Hun invasion marked the start of Friuli's decline: Aquileia, protected by meager forces, was forced to surrender and was razed to the ground by Attila in 452. After the retreat of the Huns, the survivors, who had found shelter in the lagoon of Grado, returned to the city, but found it completely destroyed. The reconstruction of Aquileia was never completed and it never regained the old splendour of the capital of X Regio. The city remained important even after the fall of the Western Roman Empire, due to the creation of the Patriarchate of Aquileia. It ranked among the highest ecclesiastic authorities in Italy from the mid-6th century onward. The lack of security in the Friulian plain, crossroads of all the great barbarian invasions, drove many people to seek shelter on the islands of the lagoons or in fortified hill-villages, causing a generalized depopulation of the more fertile part of the region and its consequent colonization by barbarian gentes.

=== Middle Ages ===
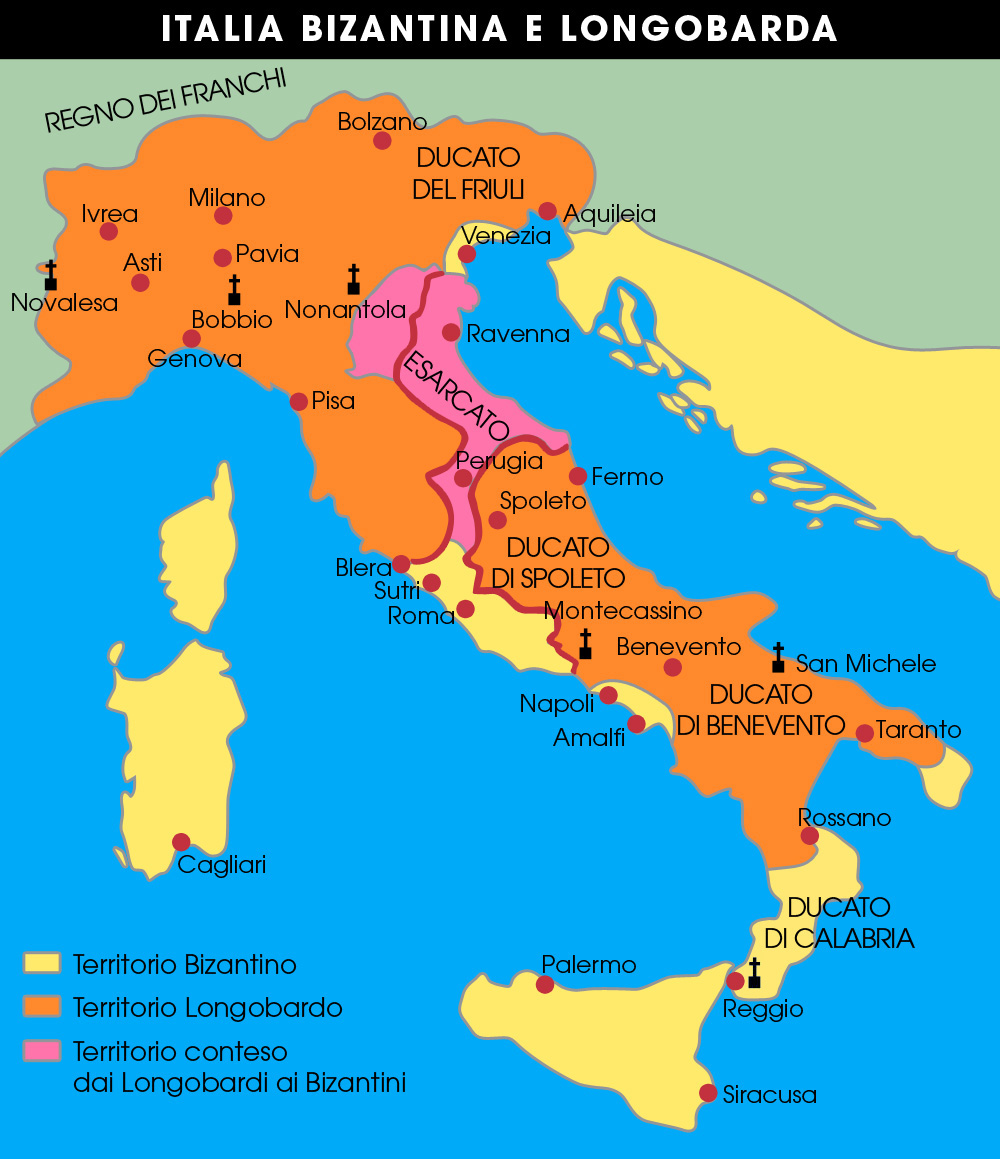
Duchy of Friuli in Italian context (750)

After the collapse of the Western Roman Empire, Friuli belonged to the kingdom of Odoacer and subsequently to that of Theodoric the Great. The Byzantine reconquest under Justinian I was brief in the region, in 568 it was one of the first provinces conquered by the Lombards, who invaded from Pannonia, and with that, ended the Greek-Byzantine era of the region. The Lombard king Alboin established the Duchy of Friuli, the first Lombard duchy, and granted it to his relative Gisulf I. The capital of the duchy was established at Forum Iulii (Cividale del Friuli), which became the most important city of the area and for where it derived its name.

The duchy of Friuli was from the start one of the most important Lombard duchies. It served as a barrier against the threat of invasion by the Avars and Slavs from Pannonia. Among the duchies of the North, which were closely aligned with the crown (unlike Spoleto and Benevento to the South), it was the most powerful, probably due to its marcher status. Among later dukes, Ratchis became king in 744 and his ducal successor, Aistulf, succeeded him as king in 749. The historian Paul the Deacon was born in Friuli (730/5), he went on to write the Historia Langobardorum and taught Latin grammar at Charlemagne's court. Another teacher and a trusted advisor Charlemagne's court, Paulinus, was born at Cividale and eventually became patriarch of Aquileia.

After the Kingdom of Italy fell to the Franks, the duchy of Friuli was reorganized into counties according to the Frankish model. The region was again reorganized into the March of Friuli in 846. The march was granted to the Unruoching dynasty. Friuli became the base of power of Berengar I during his struggles for the throne of Italy between 888 and 924.

The march was transformed under his rule, its territory extended to Lake Garda, the capital moved to Verona, and a new March of Verona and Aquileia established in its place. The territory was now subjected to the Duchy of Bavaria, then to the Duchy of Carinthia, for more than a century.

On 3 April 1077, the Emperor Henry IV granted the county of Friuli, with ducal status, to Sigaerd, Patriarch of Aquileia. In the succeeding centuries, the patriarchate expanded its control over neighboring Trieste, Istria, Carinthia, Styria, and Cadore. The patriarchal state of Friuli was one of the best organized polities of the Italian Middle Ages. From the 12th century it possessed a parliament representing the communes as well as the nobility and the clergy. This institution only survived six centuries, remaining alive yet weak even during Venetian domination. It convened for the last time in 1805, when it was abolished by Napoleon Bonaparte. The Patriarch Marquard of Randeck (1365–1381) had gathered together and codified all the laws of Friuli and promulgated them as the Constitutiones Patriae Foriiulii ("Constitutions of the Country of Friuli"). Cividale del Friuli was seat of the Patriarchate until 1238, when the patriarch moved his seat to Udine, where he had a magnificent episcopal edifice constructed. Udine was so important that it in time became the institutional capital of Friuli.

=== Venetian domination to Bourbon restoration ===
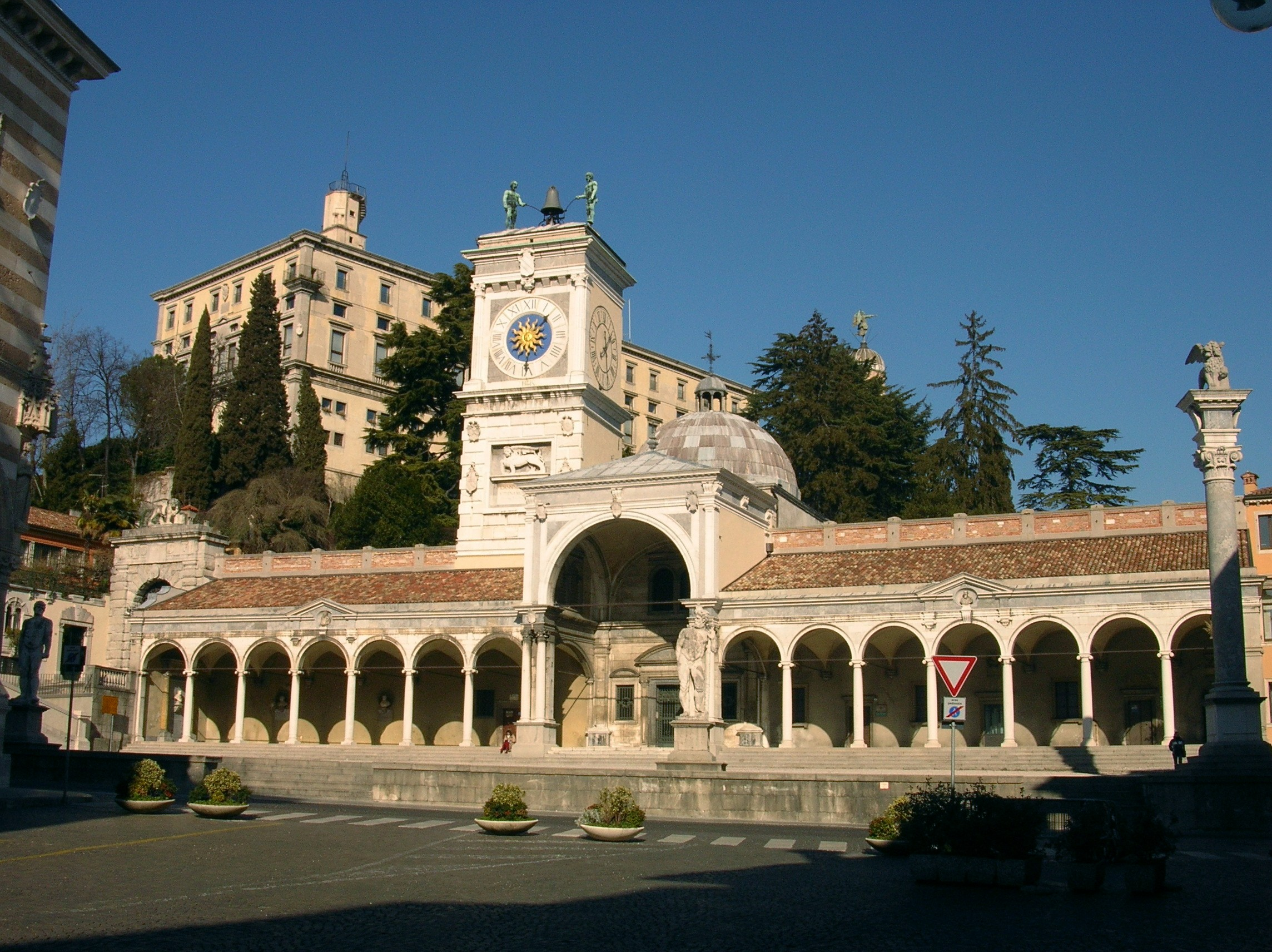
The Venetian-style Piazza Libertà in Udine. The city became de facto capital of Friuli.

The Patriarchate ended in 1420: surrounded by the powerful states of the Austrian Empire, the Kingdom of Hungary and the Republic of Venice, it was the theatre of a war between Hungary and Venice, and was conquered by the latter. Friuli maintained some form of autonomy, by keeping its own Parliament ruling on the old territory of the Patriarchate, an autonomy not granted to the other cities and provinces submitted to Venice (even Venetian ones); on the other side, it maintained also its feudal nobility, which was able to keep their feudal rights over the land and its inhabitants for some time.

Friuli was the eastern border of the Stato da Tera, and suffered both from Ottoman raids and from the border wars with Austria. These wars led to poverty and instability of the rural population, with the inability to cultivate the land crossed by fighting armies and with the forced surrender of all livestock to feed traveling troops. The harvesting of timber needed to build Venetian ships caused complete deforestation of the Bassa Friulana and central Friuli. Venice took possession of collective farms belonging to rural Friulian communities, seriously impoverishing them. These properties in turn would be sold by Venice during the 17th century to raise cash to alleviate its poor financial condition.

Beginning in the 1630s, the Venetian Republic entered a relative decline, due to the enlarging horizon of European markets (reaching now from Asia to Africa to the Americas). Venice's richest families often directed financial resources into unproductive investments (specifically real estate), while there was a loss of competitiveness in industries and services. Friuli was subject to increasing fiscal pressure, and its industries and commercial activities were affected.

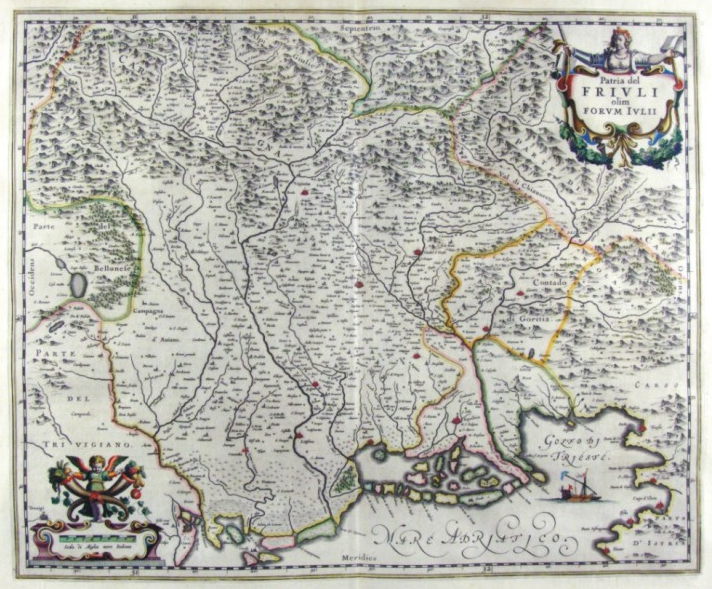
Patria del Friuli, 1650 map

According to some historians, the political populism practiced by Venice looked for ways to limit the most oppressive and anachronistic effects of feudalism. Other researchers assert that the Venetian aristocratic government maintained a most oppressive feudal condition in Friuli. These policies were practiced by the Venetian government to ensure the support of the urban and rural population as a counterbalance to the independent tendencies and power of local oligarchies and aristocrats.

An important jacquerie, known as Joibe Grasse 1511 (Fat Thursday 1511), was started in Udine on February 27 by starving Udinesi citizens. They were subsequently joined by the farmers and the revolt spread to the whole territory of Friûl, against the feudal rule of some noble families; some other noble family, like the pro-Venetian Savorgnan, initially supported the revolters. This insurrection was one of the largest in Renaissance Italy and it lasted from 27 February until 1 March, when it ended as Venice dispatched around one hundred cavalry to put down the rebellion. The chiefs of the revolt were executed, but the feudal powers of the Friulian noblemen were reduced.

With the 1516 Noyon pacts the boundary between the Venetian Republic and the County of Gorizia and Gradisca, now in the hands of the House of Habsburg, were redefined. Venice lost the upper Isonzo valley (that is the Gastaldia of Tolmino with Plezzo and Idria), but it kept Monfalcone, Marano and a series of shed feudal islands in the Western Friuli stayed with the Archduke of Austria (until 1543). Between 1615 and 1617 Venice and Austria again fought for the possession of the fort of Gradisca d'Isonzo. The so-called War of Gradisca ended with a return to the status quo.

Beginning in 1516 the Habsburg Empire controlled eastern Friuli, while western and central Friuli was Venetian. In 1797, the year of the Treaty of Campo Formio, this part of the Friuli was surrendered to Austria. For a brief period from 1805 until the Bourbon Restoration, Friuli belonged to the Italic Kingdom.

=== From the Restoration to the Great War ===
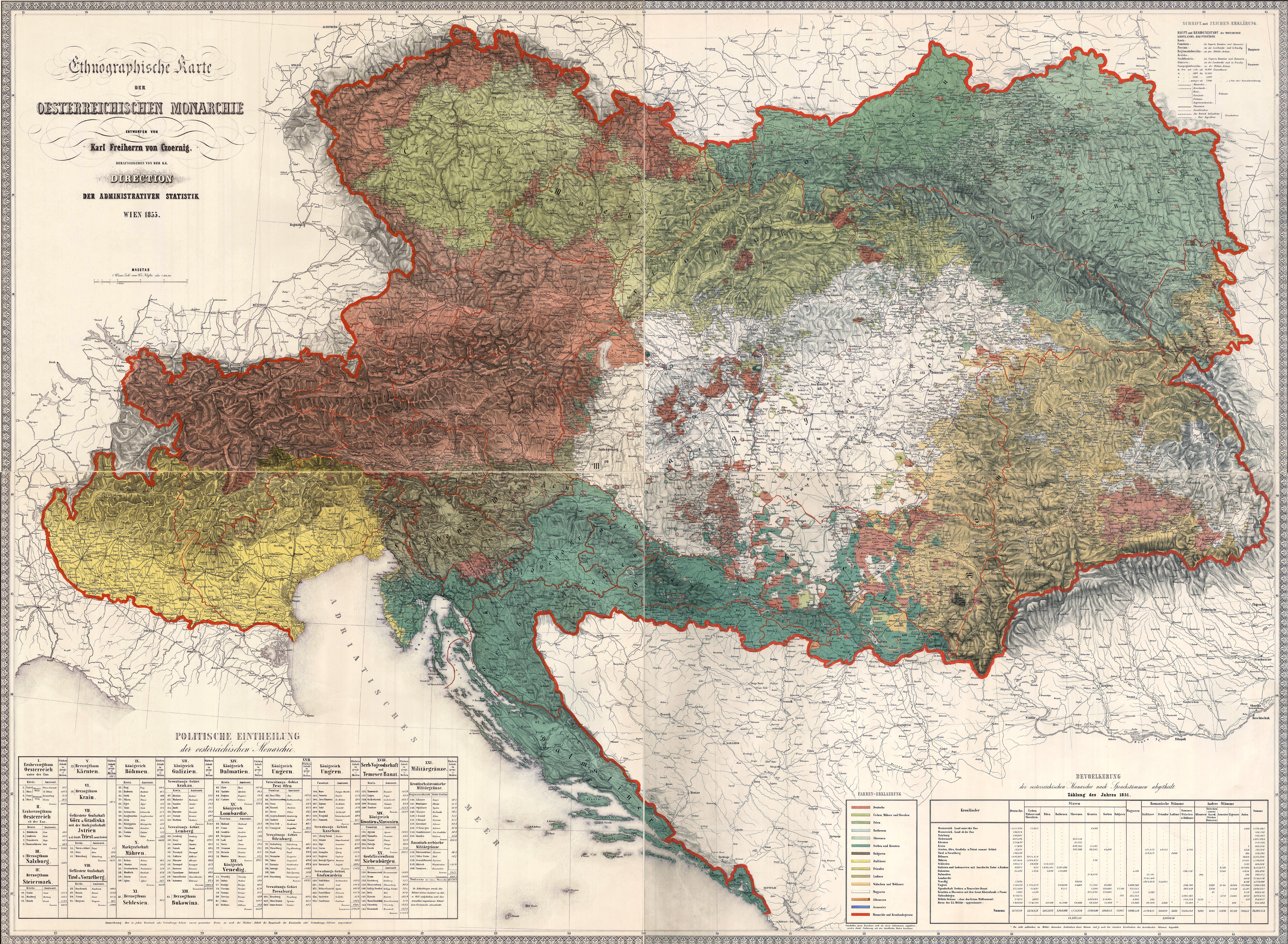
Ethnographic map of the Austrian Empire (1855) by Karl Freiherr von Czoernig

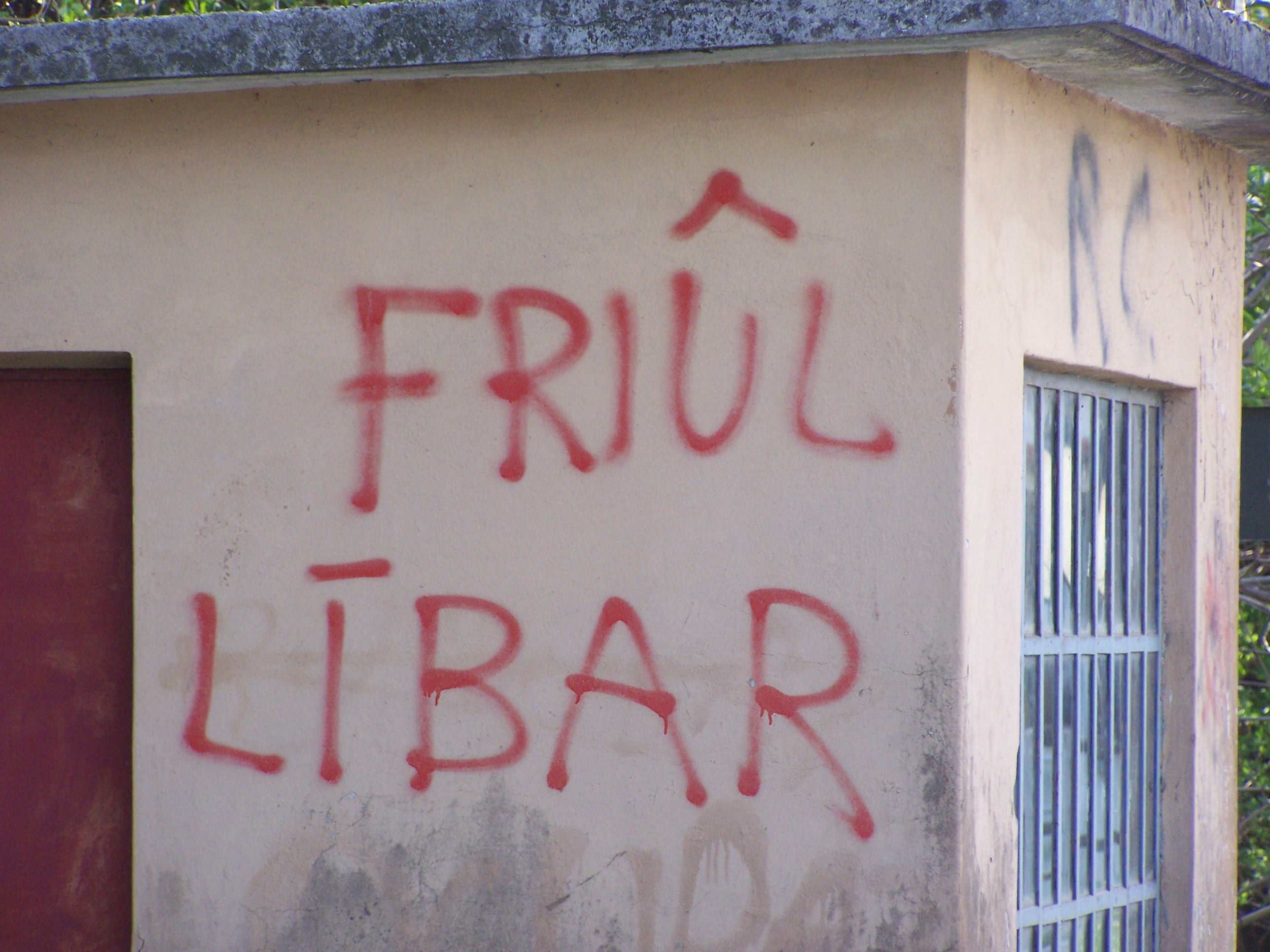
Graffiti of Friûl libar ("Free Friuli") in Aiello del Friuli

In 1815, the Congress of Vienna confirmed the union of Veneto, which Central-West Friuli was part of, with Lombardy (previously divided between Austrian Empire and Venetian Republic), to constitute the Kingdom of Lombardy–Venetia. Eastern Friuli was not included in the puppet state. In 1838, the District of Portogruaro was removed from the Province of the Friuli due to the Austrians' wishes and assigned to the Province of Venice. Portogruaro was for long time part of Friuli, even under Venetian Republic, and Friulian language was spoken in the area. In 1866, central Friuli (today's province of Udine) and western Friuli (today's province of Pordenone) were annexed by Italy together with Veneto after the Third Italian War of Independence, while eastern Friuli (County of Gorizia and Gradisca) remained under Austria until the end of World War I.

The Ethnographic map of Karl von Czoernig-Czernhausen, issued by the k. u. k. Administration of Statistics in 1855, recorded a total of 401,357 Friulians living in the Austrian Empire. The majority of Friulians (351,805) lived in that part of Friuli that belonged to the Kingdom of Lombardy–Venetia, the others (49.552) in the Friulian parts of the Austrian Küstenland. Friulians were registered as their own category separate from Italians.

During World War I, Friuli was a theater of battle that had serious consequences for the civilian population, specifically the Battle of Caporetto.

=== Autonomist movements ===
After World War II, the pro-devolution movement gained momentum in 1945. Friuli got entangled in the maze of opposing forces acting in the territory. Yugoslavian Titoists pursued an annexation of Friuli to the rising communist Yugoslavia. By contrast, in 1945, the traditionalist association Patrie tal Friul was founded by Tiziano Tessitori with a view to establishing an autonomous Friuli within Italy. The draft autonomic project was launched with the support of the Christian Democratic Party.

In January 1947, the poet and filmmaker Pier Paolo Pasolini went on to found the party Movimiento Popolari Friulano, with the same purpose of devolution. Pasolini opposed a possible Yugoslavian annexation, but at the same time lashed out at those who aimed at using regionalism for their immobilist, "backwards Conservatism". Pasolini dropped membership in his party after the Christian Democrats came to pull its strings. The Communist Party of Italy opposed devolution, sticking to an Italian centralist agenda.

Around 350,000 people claim Friulan as their native language, though it is sparsely used in public life. There are some movements and political parties that advocate a more autonomous, or even an independent Friuli in line with historical borders, such as the Friuli Movement, Front Furlan, Patrie Furlane and Republiche dal Friûl – Parlament furlan.

== Regional languages and dialects ==
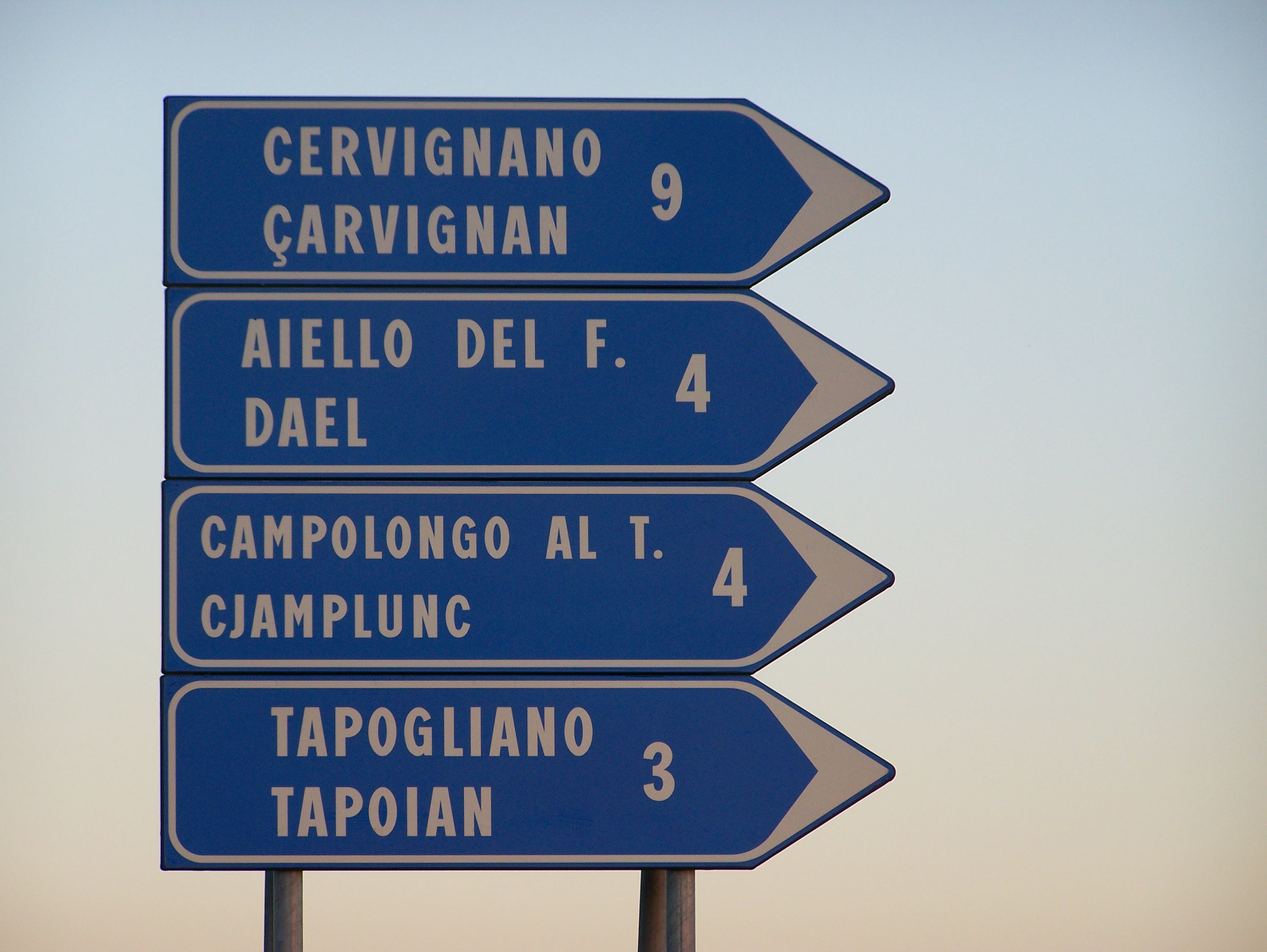
Bilingual road sign (Italian and Friulian) near San Vito al Torre

While standard Italian is the primary official language of the region, several other regional languages and dialects are spoken in Friuli.

Friulian is spoken in the provinces of Udine, Gorizia, and Pordenone.

Venetian and its dialects are usually spoken (for historical reasons) on the western border regions (i.e. Pordenone), sparingly in a few internal towns (i.e. Gorizia, etc.), and historically in some places along the Adriatic coast.

In the southeastern part of Friuli, a Venetian transitional dialect is spoken, called Bisiaco, that has influences of both Slovene and Friulian.

Slovene dialects are spoken in the largely rural border mountain region known as Venetian Slovenia. German (Bavarian dialect) is spoken in Val Canale (mostly in Tarvisio and Pontebba); in some of Val Canale's municipalities (particularly in Malborghetto Valbruna), Carinthian Slovenian dialects are spoken too. Slovene is also spoken in the Collio area north of Gorizia. In the Resia valley, between Venetian Slovenia and the Val Canale, most of the inhabitants still speak an archaic dialect of Slovene, known as Resian. According to the official estimates of the Italian government, between 45,000 and 51,000 Slovene speakers live in Friuli: around 11,000 in the Province of Gorizia, and the rest in the Province of Udine. Due to emigration, most Slovene speakers in the Province of Udine live outside their traditional compact zone of settlement.

German-related dialects (like Rogasaxon) are spoken in several ancient enclaves like Timau, Zahre (Sauris) and Plodn (Sappada).

Only Friulian, Slovenian and German are allowed to be local secondary official languages in their historic areas, but not their related dialects.

== Asteroid ==
Asteroid 212705 Friûl was named in honor of the region. The official naming citation was published by the Minor Planet Center on 25 September 2018 (M.P.C. 111803).

== See also ==
- Benandanti
- Furlanis
- Ladinia
- List of dukes and margraves of Friuli
- List of Friulian place names
- Triveneto
- Venetian Slovenia
