= Furlani =

Furlani is a surname. Notable people with the surname include:

- Erika Furlani (born 1996), Italian high jumper
- Valmir (born Valmir Furlani, 1969), Brazilian footballer
- Mattia Furlani (born 2005), Italian long jumper and high jumper

== See also ==
- Furlanis
- Claire Forlani, actor
