= Friulian Dolomites Natural Park =

Protected area in Italy

Parco Naturale Dolomiti Friulane
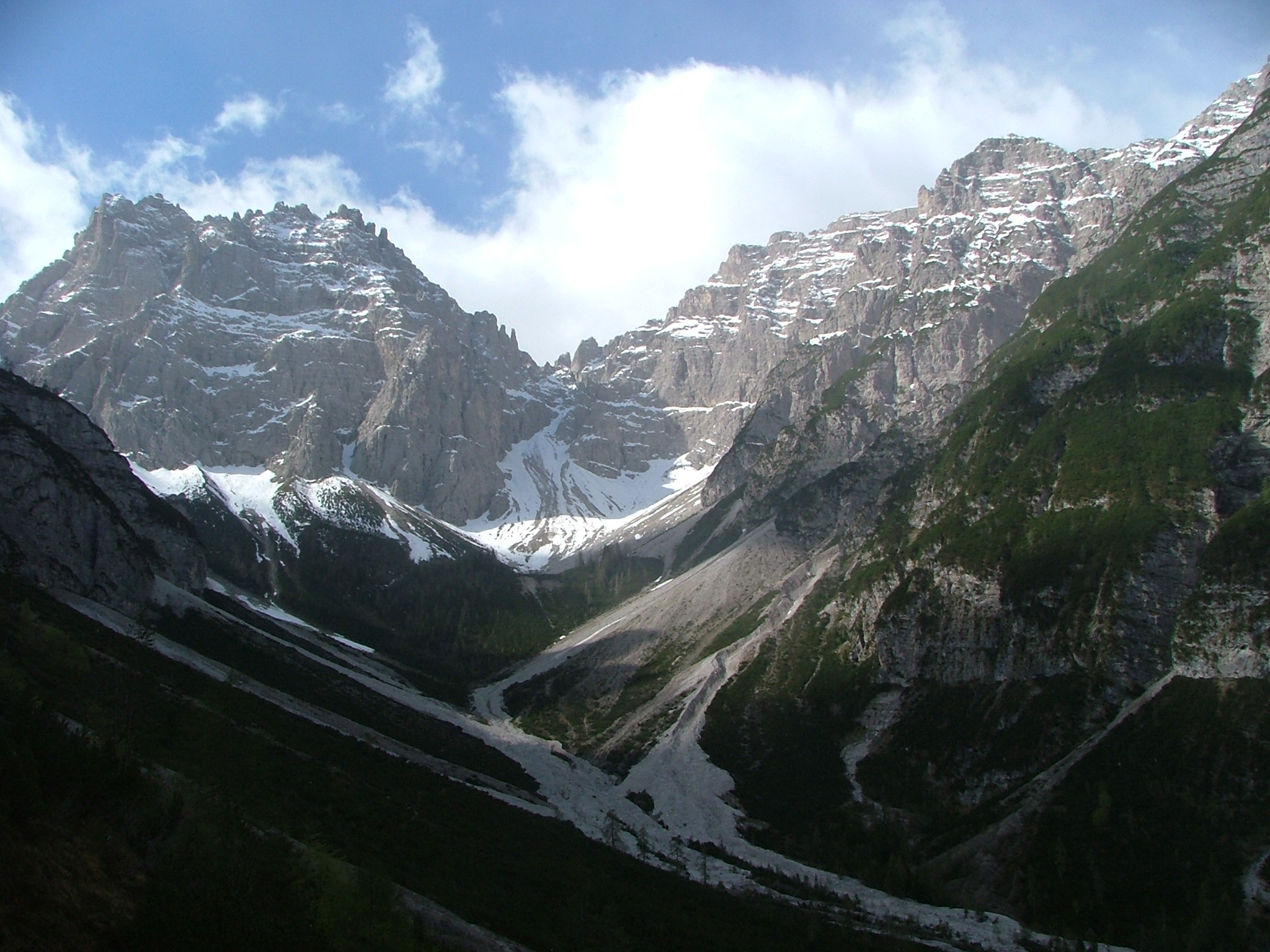
- Interactive map of Parco Naturale Dolomiti Friulane
- Location: Friuli-Venezia Giulia, Italy
- Coordinates: 46°20′N 12°34′E
- Area: 36,950 ha (91,300 acres)
- Established: 1996
- Website: www.parcodolomitifriulane.it

The Friulian Dolomites Natural Park (Italian: Parco Naturale Dolomiti Friulane) is a nature reserve in Friuli-Venezia Giulia, Italy. Established in 1996, it encompasses the Friulian Dolomites and the upper Tagliamento valley and is the largest natural park in Friuli-Venezia Giulia. It is mostly located in the province of Pordenone, with a smaller part in the province of Udine.

The park's fauna includes chamois, roe deer, red deer, alpine ibexes, marmots, capercaillie, peregrine falcons, black grouse, and golden eagles (sixteen specimens), which are the symbol of the park.

Nine visitor centers are located within the park.
