= Taquaritinga =

- Municipality
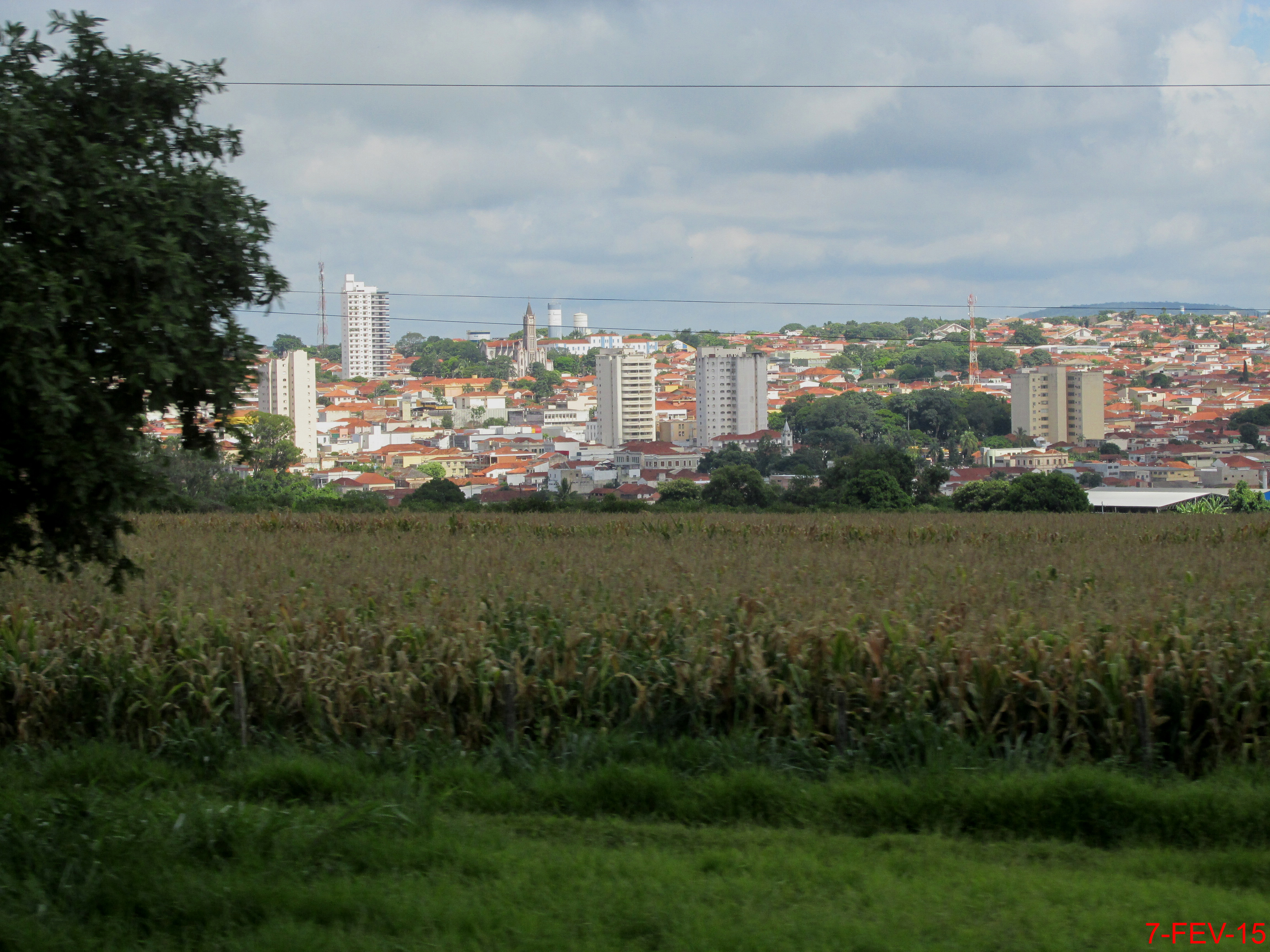

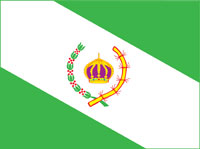
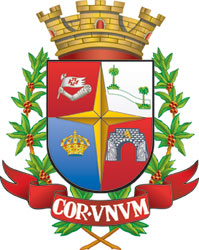
- Flag Coat of arms

- Location in São Paulo state

- Location in Brazil
- Coordinates: 21°24′21″S 48°30′18″W
- Country: Brazil
- Region: Southeast
- State: São Paulo

Area
  - Total: 594 km^{2} (229 sq mi)

Population (2020)
  - Total: 57,364
  - Density: 96.6/km^{2} (250/sq mi)
- Time zone: UTC-03:00 (BRT)
  - Summer (DST): UTC-02:00 (BRST)

Taquaritinga is a city in the Central North area of the State of São Paulo, Brazil. The population is 57,364 (2020 est.) in an area of 594 km^{2} (229 sq mi). The population is formed mostly by European descendants (Italians, Spaniards, and Portuguese). Afro-Brazilians and Japanese-Brazilians are important minority groups.

The climate is tropical of altitude with dry mild winter and hot rainy summer. The economy of the city is based in agrobusiness (sugarcane, orange, lemon, and fruits) and services. The city has an old and regionally famous music school (Conservatório Santa Cecília), an ETEC (Technical School), and three colleges. The most important of them, FATEC, is a public one with courses on technology. Clube Atlético Taquaritinga, founded in 1942, is the football club of the city. The club plays its home matches at Estádio Adail N. da Silva, which has a maximum capacity of approximately 20,000 people.

== Media ==
In telecommunications, the city was served by Companhia Telefônica Brasileira until 1973, when it began to be served by Telecomunicações de São Paulo. In July 1998, this company was acquired by Telefónica, which adopted the Vivo brand in 2012.

The company is currently an operator of cell phones, fixed lines, internet (fiber optics/4G) and television (satellite and cable).

== Notable people ==
Taquaritinga was the birthplace of:

- Edmílson José Gomes de Morais (b. 1976): footballer, 2002 FIFA World Cup champion
- José Paulo Paes (b. July 22, 1926 - d. October 9, 1998) was a poet, translator, literary critic and essayist.
- Valmir Furlani (b. 1969), footballer
- Luiz Araújo (b. 1996): footballer for Flamengo

== Religion ==
Christianity is present in the city as follows:

=== Catholic Church ===
The Catholic church in the municipality is part of the Roman Catholic Diocese of Jaboticabal.

=== Protestant Church ===
The most diverse evangelical beliefs are present in the city, mainly Pentecostal, including the Assemblies of God in Brazil (the largest evangelical church in the country), Christian Congregation in Brazil, among others. These denominations are growing more and more throughout Brazil.
