= José Paulo Paes =

Brazilian writer, poet and literary critic

José Paulo Paes (22 July 1926 – 9 October 1998) was a Brazilian poet, literary critic, and translator. He rendered into Portuguese works by W. H. Auden, Lewis Carroll, and Laurence Sterne

== Biography ==
Paes was born in Taquaritinga in the state of São Paulo. He studied industrial chemistry in Curitiba, where he also started his literary career. He wrote poems for the magazine Joaquim, directed by Dalton Trevisan. His first book of poems, O Aluno, was published in 1947.

Paes moved to São Paulo in 1949, writing poems while also working in a pharmaceutical laboratory. In 1963, he left the laboratory to work as an editor at the Editora Cultrix publishing house, retiring in 1981 and dedicating completely to writing. The author died in São Paulo on 9 October 1998.

== Published works ==
- O aluno (1947)
- Cúmplices (1951)
- Novas cartas chilenas (1954)
- Mistério em casa (1961)
- Resíduo (1973)
- Calendário perplexo (1983)
- É isso ali (1984)
- Gregos e baianos (1985)
- Prosas seguidas de odes mínimas (1992)
- A poesia está morta mas juro que não fui eu (1988)
- De ontem para hoje (1996)
- Um passarinho me contou (Prêmio Jabuti 1997)
- Melhores poemas (1998)
- Uma letra puxa a outra (1998)
- Ri melhor quem ri primeiro (1999)
- O lugar do outro (1999)
- Socráticas (2001)
