= Carnic Prealps =

Mountain range in Italy

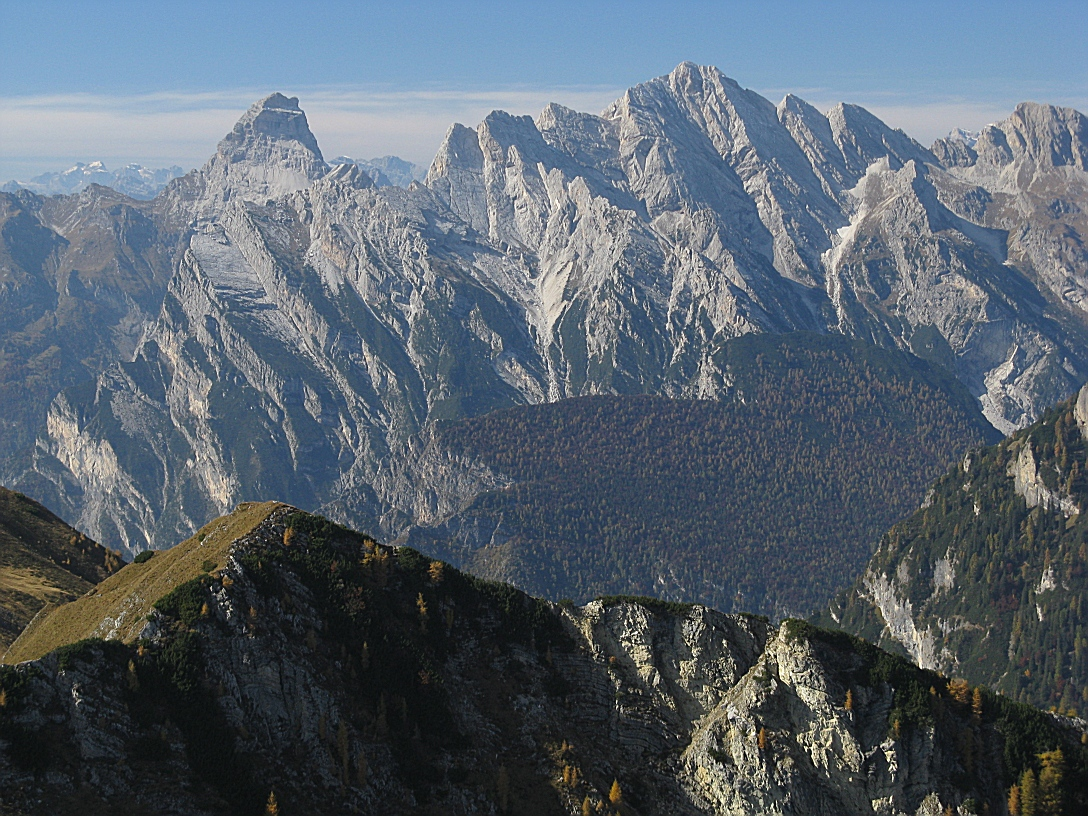
- Cima dei Preti, the highest mount of the range

Highest point
- Peak: Cima dei Preti
- Elevation: 2,703 m (8,868 ft)
- Coordinates: 46°34′24″N 12°42′11″E

Naming
- Native name: Prealpi Carniche (Italian)

Geography
- Location within Alps
- Country: Italy
- Region: Friuli-Venezia Giulia
- River: Tagliamento
- Parent range: Carnic and Gailtal Alps
- Borders on: Julian Alps and Prealps, Venetian Prealps, Dolomites, Carnic Alps and Po plain

Geology
- Orogeny: Alpine orogeny
- Rock type: Sedimentary rocks

The Carnic Prealps (Prealpi Carniche in Italian) or Southern Carnic Alps (German: Südliche Karnische Alpen) are a mountain range in the Southern Limestone Alps, part of the larger Carnic and Gailtal Alps group. They are located in Friuli-Venezia Giulia, in the northern part of Italy.

== Geography ==
According to the Alpine Club classification of the Eastern Alps, the Carnic Prealps (AVE 57b) stretch from the Piave River in the south and west up to Sappada and Forni Avoltri, forming the border with the Dolomites range. The northern border with the main chain of the Carnic Alps runs along the Degano Valley to Comeglians in the Carnia region, and further eastwards via Paluzza, Ligosullo and Paularo to the Fella Valley at Pontebba. In the east the ravine of the Tagliamento River marks the border with the Julian Alps down to the Padan Plain in the south.

Administratively the range belongs to the Italian province of Pordenone and Udine.

== Notable summits ==
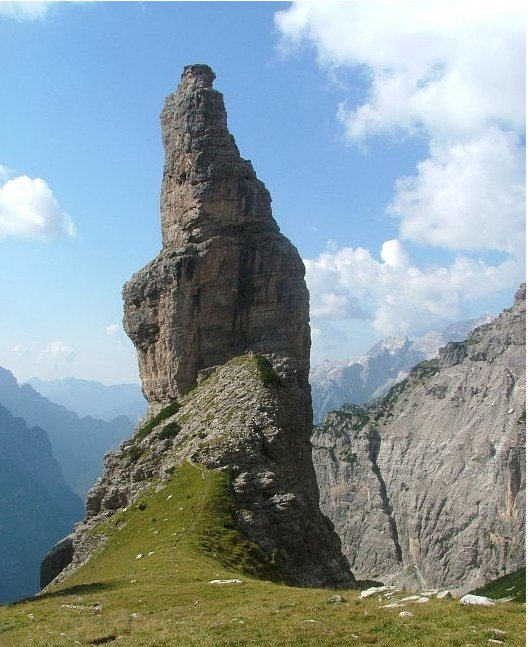
Campanile di Val Montanaia (Dolomiti Friulane supergroup)

Some notable summits of the range are:

Name	metres
Cima dei Preti	2,703
Monte Duranno	2,652
Monte Cridola	2,581
Croda Montanaia	2,548
Cima Both	2,437

== See also ==
- Carnic Alps

== Maps ==
- Italian official cartography (Istituto Geografico Militare - IGM); on-line version: www.pcn.minambiente.it
