= Friulian Dolomites =

Alpine mountain range in northeastern Italy

- Italian: Dolomiti Friulane
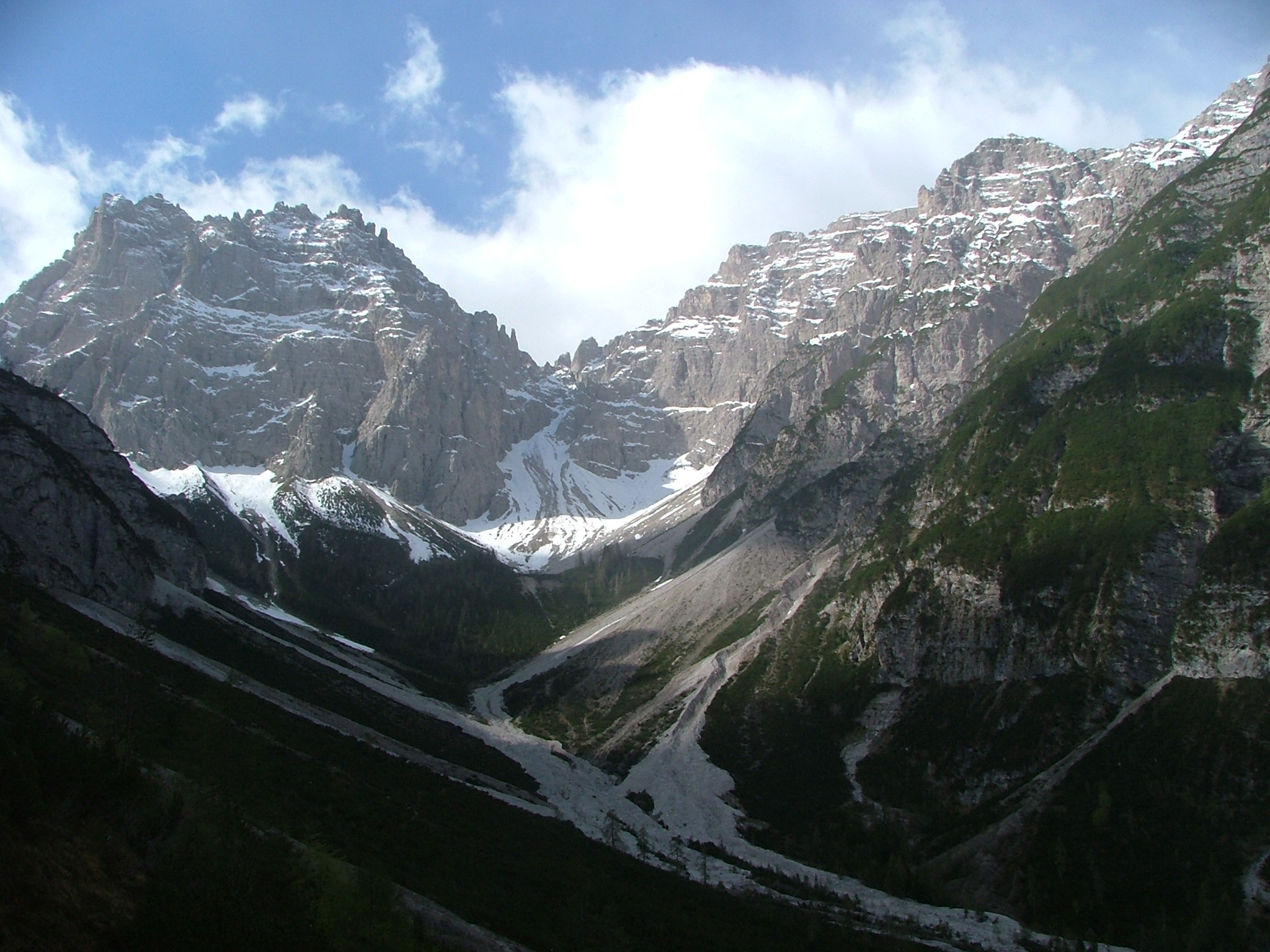

Highest point
- Peak: Cima dei Preti
- Elevation: 2,703 m (8,868 ft)
- Coordinates: 46°20′43″N 12°24′49″E

Geography
- Location: Veneto and Friuli-Venezia Giulia, Italy
- Parent range: Carnic Prealps, Carnic and Gailtal Alps

The Friulian Dolomites (Italian: Dolomiti Friulane; Friulian: Dolomitis), also known as Dolomiti d'Oltre Piave ("Dolomites beyond the Piave") are a mountain range in the Carnic and Gailtal Alps. They are located in northeastern Veneto and Friuli-Venezia Giulia, in northeastern Italy. They are the easternmost dolomitic group. As part of the Dolomites, they have been officially recognized as UNESCO World Heritage Site under the World Heritage Convention, and most of their area is also covered by the Friulian Dolomites Natural Park.

The range is located across the provinces of Belluno, Udine and Pordenone, between the upper Piave valley to the west, the Meduna valley to the east, the Cellina river valley to the south, and the upper Tagliamento valley to the north. It is divided into four sub-groups, Cridola, Spalti-Monfalconi, Duranno and Pramaggiore.

== Peaks ==
Notable peaks of the Friulian Dolomites are:

Peak	Elevation (m/ft)	
Cima dei Preti	2703	8868
Monte Duranno	2652	8700
Monte Cridola	2581	8467
Croda Montanaia	2548	8359
Crodon di Giaf	2523	8277
Monte Pramaggiore	2479	8133

== See also ==
- Eastern Alps
- Dolomites
- Limestone Alps
