= Cima dei Preti =

Mountain in Italy

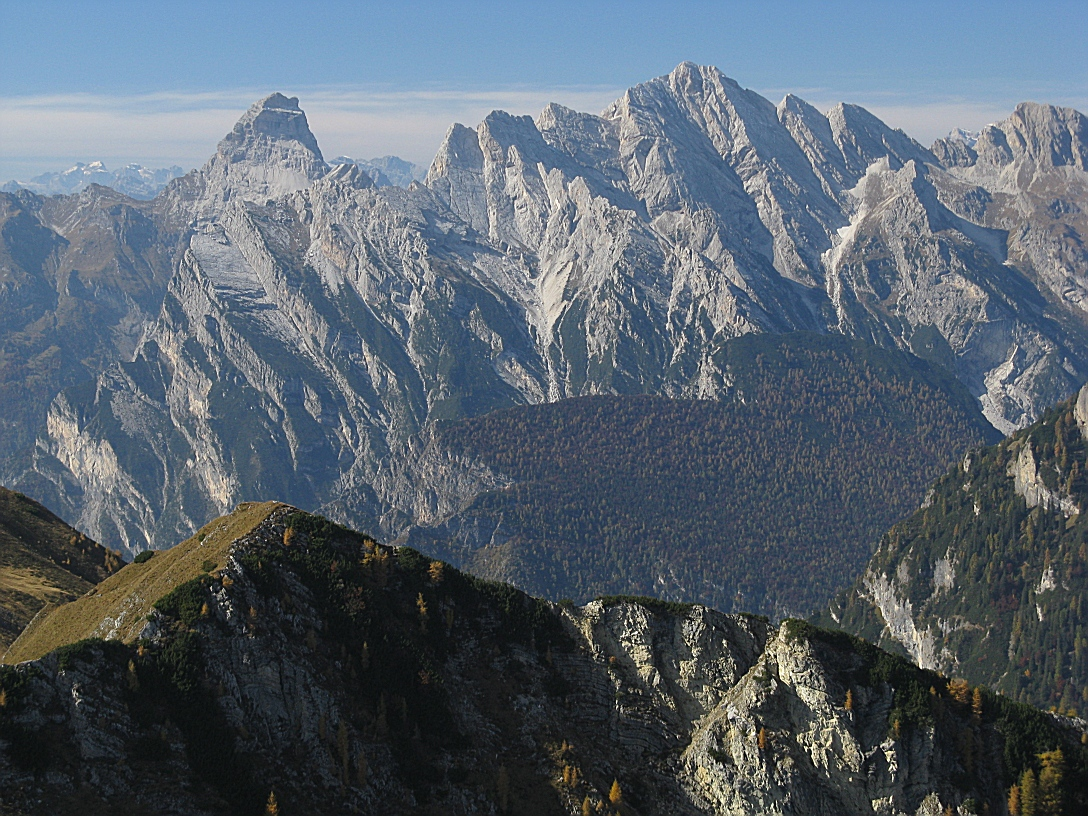

Highest point
- Elevation: 2,703 m (8,868 ft)
- Listing: Alpine mountains 2500-2999 m
- Coordinates: 46°20′36″N 12°25′13″E

Geography
- Location within Alps
- Location: Friuli-Venezia Giulia / Veneto, Italy
- Parent range: Carnic Prealps

Climbing
- First ascent: 23 September 1874 by Santo Siorpaes and Maurice Holzmann

Cima dei Preti (Italian: "Priests' Peak"; Friulian: Cuel dal Preôt) is a mountain in the Carnic Prealps, the highest peak of the Friulian Dolomites, Italy. It is located at the boundaries between the provinces of Pordenone and Belluno.

== SOIUSA classification ==
According to the SOIUSA (International Standardized Mountain Subdivision of the Alps) the mountain can be classified in the following way:

- main part = Eastern Alps
- major sector = Southern Limestone Alps
- section = Carnic and Gailtal Alps
- subsection = Carnic Prealps
- supergroup =Catena Duranno-Monfalconi-Pramaggiore
- group = Gruppo del Duranno
- code = II/C-33.III-A.3
