= Furlanis =

Furlanis is a surname of Italian descent.

== Meaning ==
The meaning of this surname is one who lived in the region of Friuli, which is located in northern Italy.

== Coat of arms ==
The Furlanis coat of arms is a silver shield with three blue chevrons.
