= Piazza Libertà =

Coordinates: 46.063366°N 13.23578°E

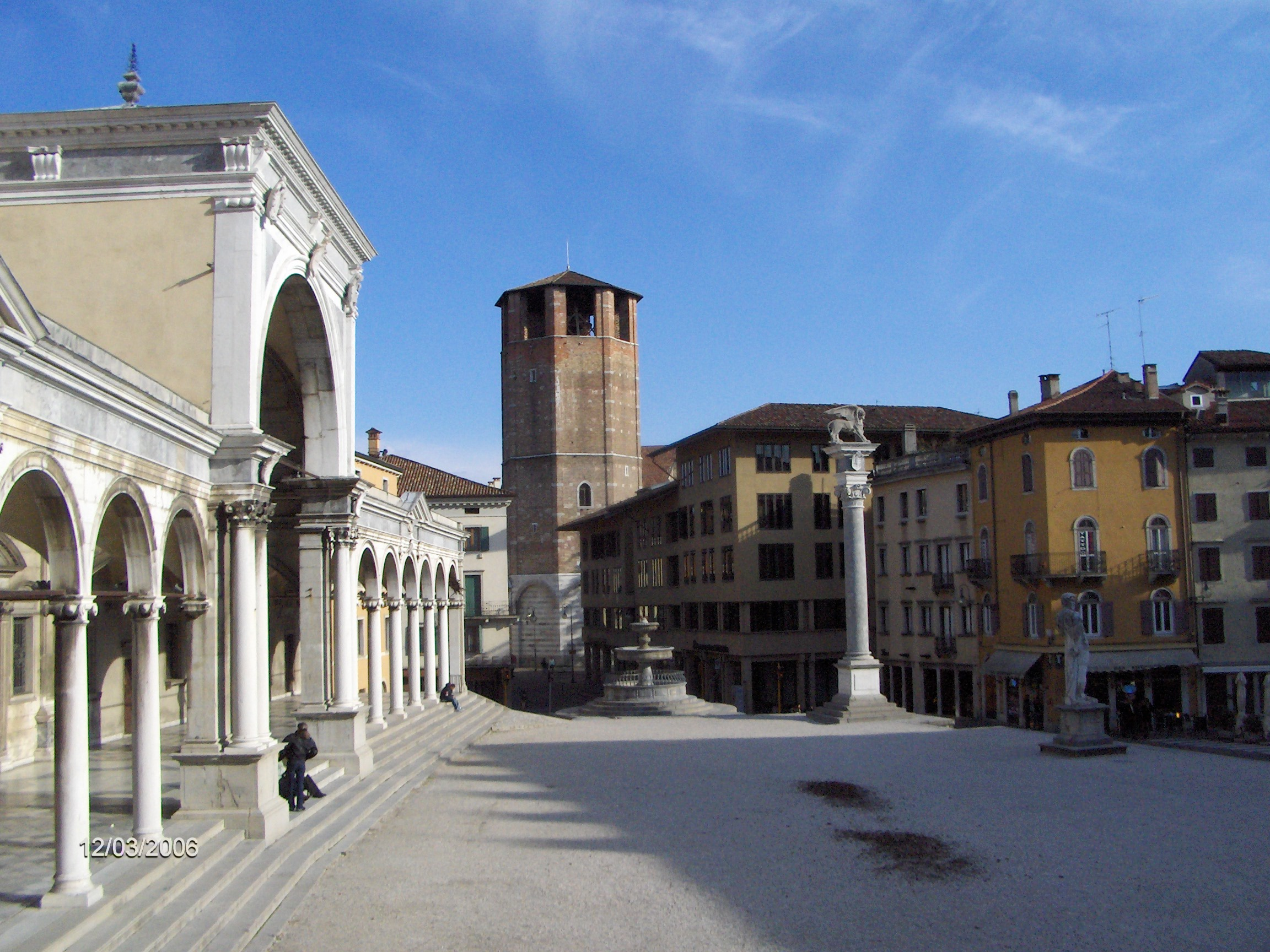
Piazza Libertà

Piazza Libertà, also known as Piazza della Libertà is the oldest square in Udine, in Friuli-Venezia Giulia region, Italy. The square sits in the open space below Udine Castle.

In the square stands the town hall (Loggia del Lionello) built in 1448–1457 in the Venetian-Gothic style opposite a clock tower (Torre dell'Orologio) resembling that of the Piazza San Marco at Venice. It was begun in 1448 on a project by Nicolò Lionello, a local goldsmith, and was rebuilt following a fire in 1876. The new design was projected by the architect Andrea Scala.

Opposite the Loggia del Lionello is the Loggia di San Giovanni, a Renaissance structure designed by Bernardino da Morcote. Other noteworthy monuments in the square are the Fountain by Giovanni Carrara, an architect from Bergamo (1542); the Columns bearing the Venetian Lion and the Statue of Justice (1614), the statues of Hercules and Cacus and the Statue of Peace (1819) which was donated to Udine by Emperor Francis I to commemorate the peace Treaty of Campoformido.

The square has been known by a number of names including Plàzze dal Vin, Plàzze dal Común, and Piazza Contarena.

== Gallery ==
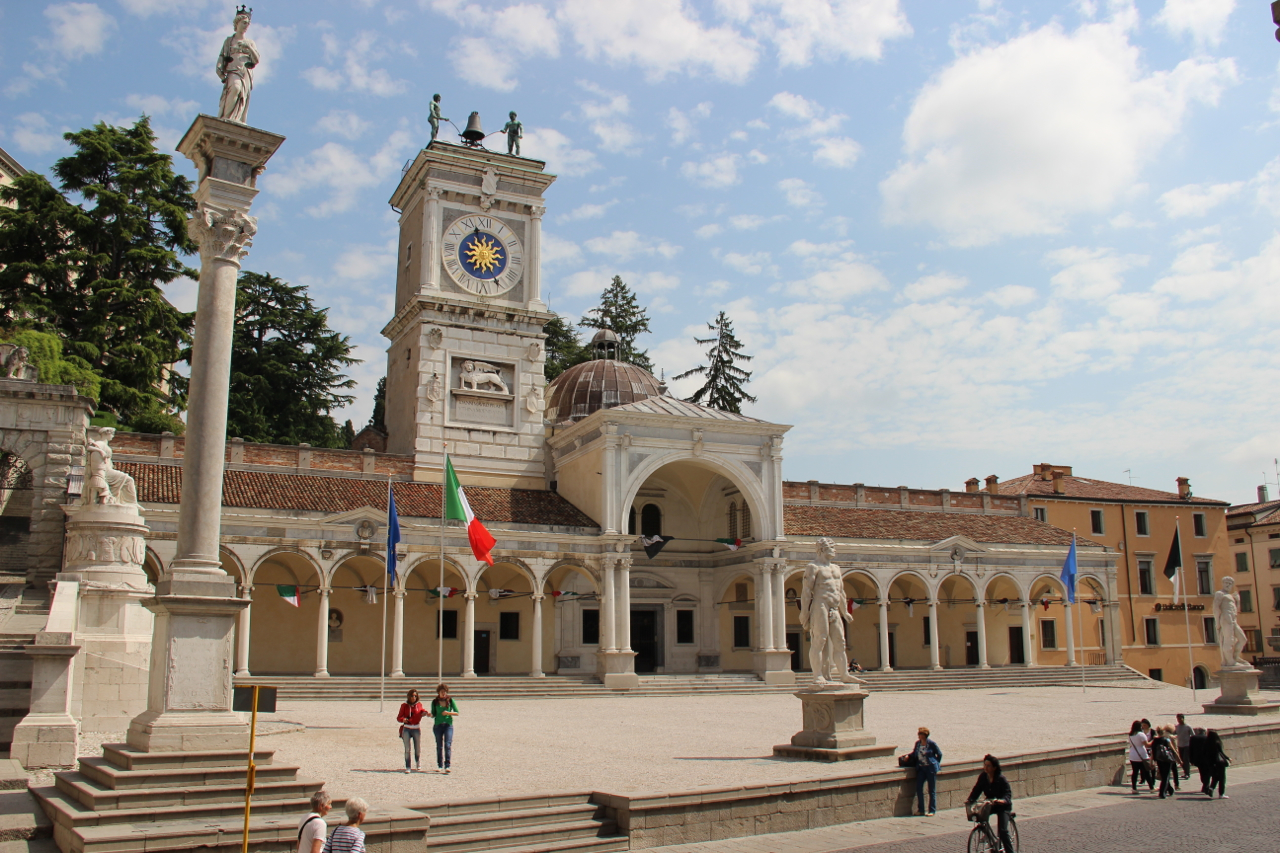

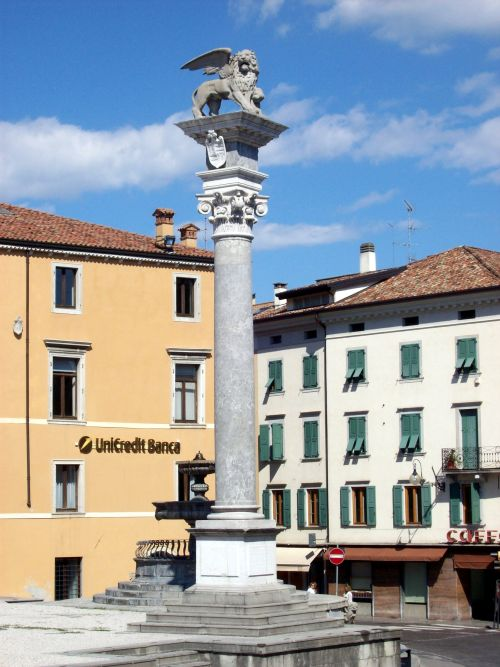
The column bearing the Venetian Lion

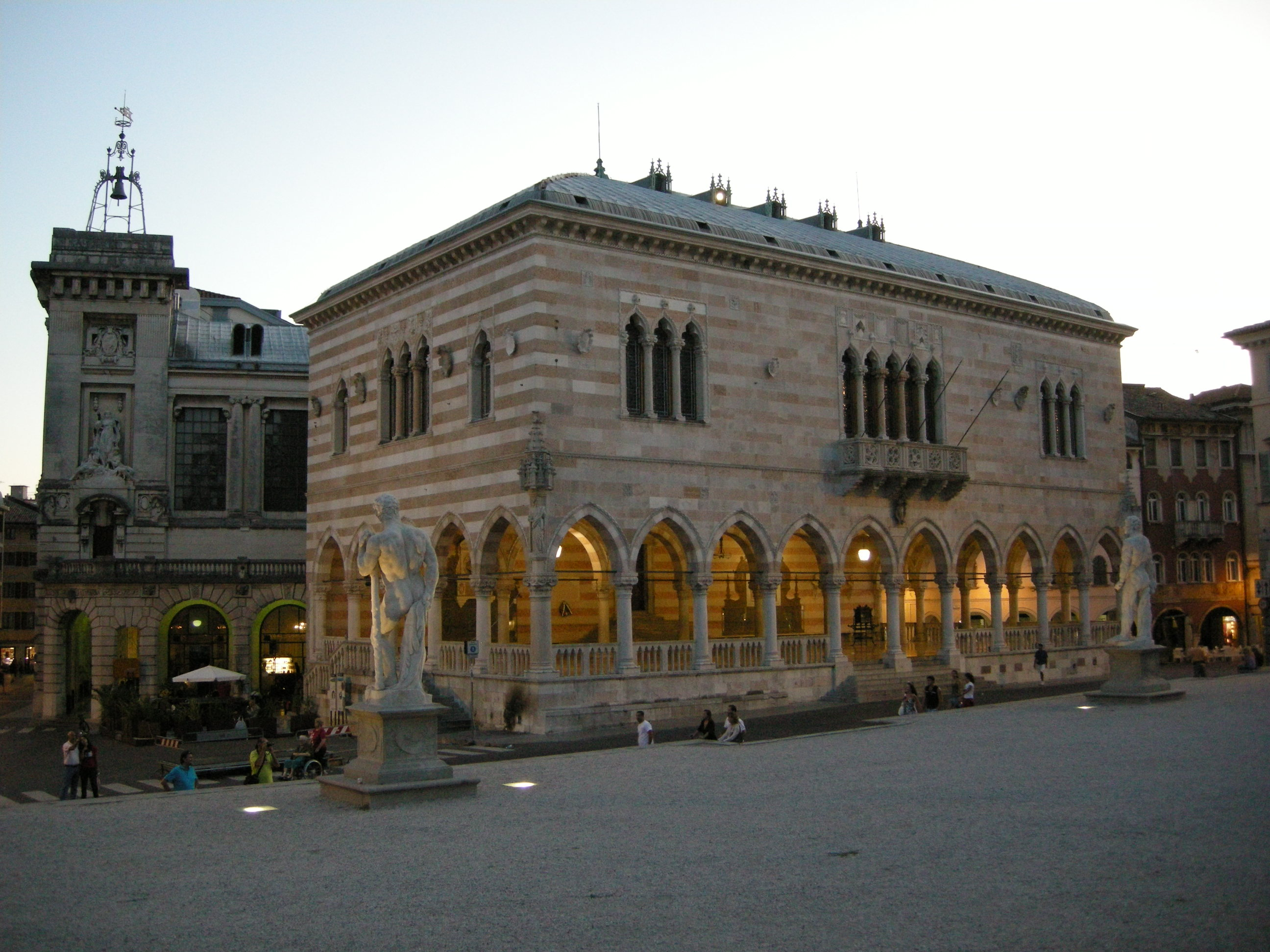
Loggia del Lionello

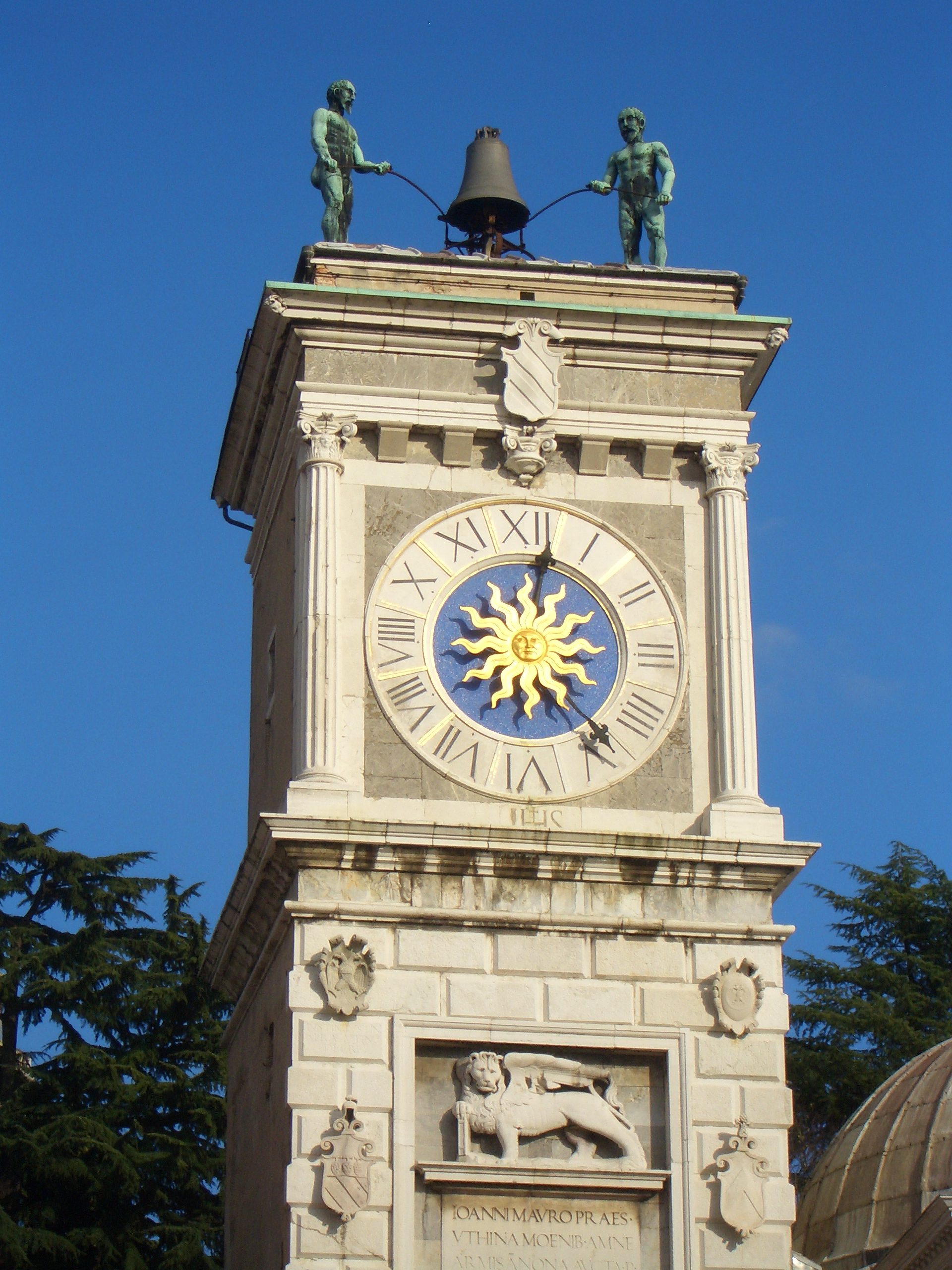
Clock tower (Torre dell'Orologio)

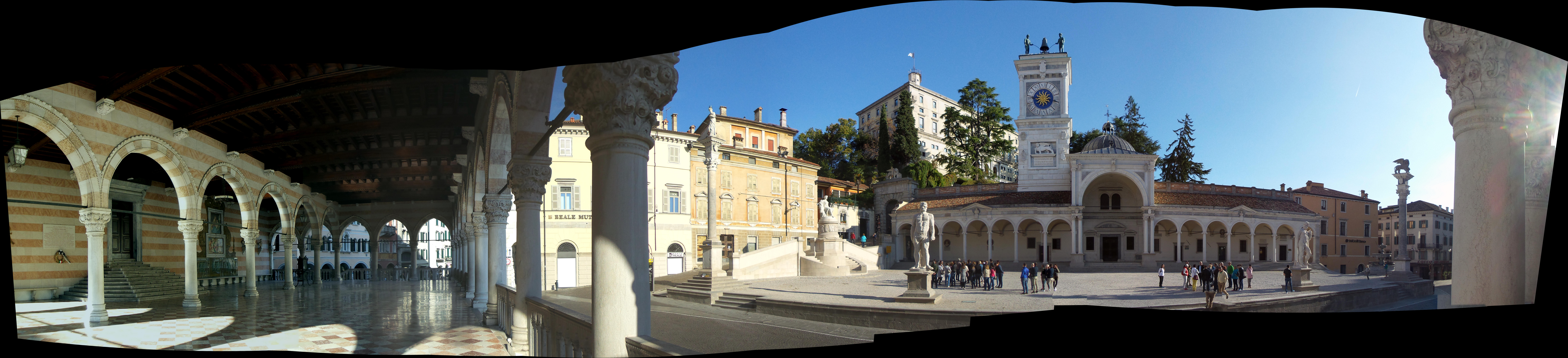
Panorama view of Piazza Libertà from Loggia del Lionello
