= Valmir (footballer, born 1969) =

Brazilian footballer

Personal information
- Full name: Valmir Furlani
- Date of birth: 28 May 1969 (age 57)
- Place of birth: Taquaritinga, São Paulo, Brazil
- Height: 1.76 m (5 ft 9 in)
- Position: Right-back

Youth career
- Taquaritinga

Senior career*
Years	Team	Apps	(Gls)
–1988	Taquaritinga		
1988–1995	Guarani		
1996	Santa Cruz		
1997	Bahia		
1998	Ponte Preta		
–	Inter de Limeira		
–	São Carlense		
–	CRB		
–	Anápolis		
–	CRAC		
–	Novorizontino		
–	Jaboticabal		
- * Club domestic league appearances and goals

Valmir Furlani or simply Valmir (born 28 May 1969) is a Brazilian former professional footballer who played as a right-back.

== Career ==
Born in Taquaritinga, São Paulo, Valmir began playing football in with local side Clube Atlético Taquaritinga, where he would be voted the best right-back in the 1988 Campeonato Paulista Série A2. He joined Guarani Futebol Clube shortly after winning the award, and spent seven years with the club making several appearances in Campeonato Brasileiro Série A.

Valmir spent the next three seasons playing for Santa Cruz Futebol Clube, Esporte Clube Bahia and Associação Atlética Ponte Preta. He finished his playing career at several smaller clubs, Associação Atlética Internacional (Limeira), Grêmio Esportivo Sãocarlense, Clube de Regatas Brasil, Anápolis Futebol Clube, Clube Recreativo e Atlético Catalano, Grêmio Esportivo Novorizontino and Jaboticabal Atlético.

After he retired from playing, Valmir began coaching football. He has managed the youth and reserve sides of Taquaritinga.
