= San Nicolò di Comelico =

- Comune
- Comune di San Nicolò di Comelico
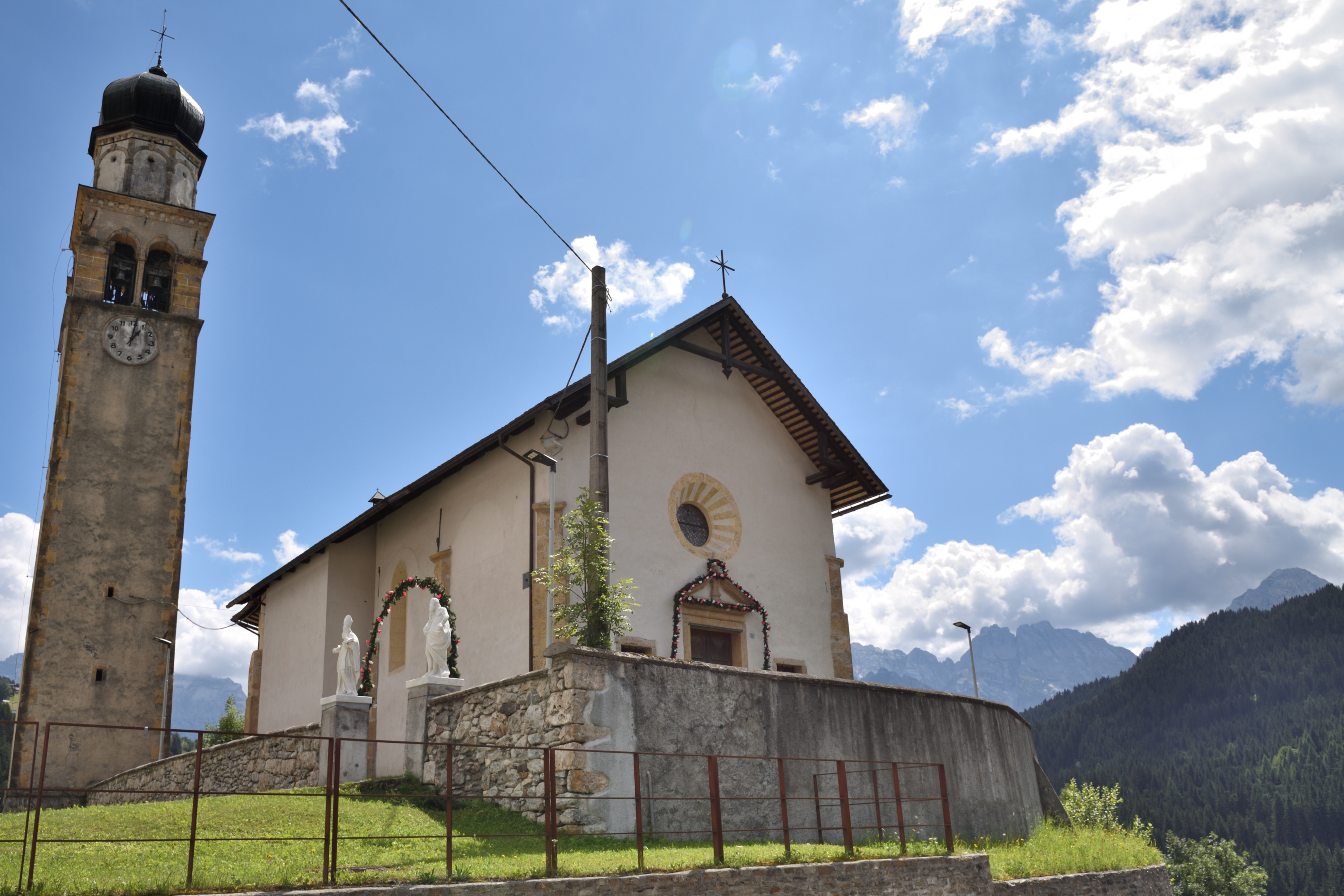
- Church of San Nicolò Vescovo

- Coat of arms

- Location within Italy Location within Veneto
- Coordinates: 46°35′N 12°32′E
- Country: Italy
- Region: Veneto
- Province: Belluno (BL)
- Frazioni: Costa

Government
  - Mayor: Giancarlo Ianese

Area
  - Total: 24.3 km^{2} (9.4 sq mi)
- Elevation: 1,061 m (3,481 ft)

Population (Dec. 2004)
  - Total: 419
  - Density: 17.2/km^{2} (44.7/sq mi)
- Demonym: Comelicesi
- Time zone: UTC+1 (CET)
  - Summer (DST): UTC+2 (CEST)
- Postal code: 32040
- Dialing code: 0435

San Nicolò di Comelico (Ladin: San Nuclò) is a comune (municipality) in the province of Belluno in the Italian region of Veneto, located about 130 kilometres (81 mi) north of Venice.

San Nicolò di Comelico borders the following municipalities: Comelico Superiore, Danta di Cadore, Kartitsch (Austria), Obertilliach (Austria), San Pietro di Cadore, Santo Stefano di Cadore.

The 12th-century church at San Nicolò contains frescoes by Italian artist Gianfrancesco da Tolmezzo. Also known as Gianfranco del Zotto, he was born in Socchieve and lived from 1450 to 1510. He is considered to be one of the founders of the Tolmezzo school of painting and was one of the leading exponents of Friulian art in the 15th century (the quattrocento in Italian). Works of his survive at the church of San Nicolò, at the parish church of Provesano in San Giorgio della Richinvelda, and at Castel d'Aviano, Budoia, Pordenone, Cordenons, Vivaro, Forni di Sotto, Forni di Sopra, and his birth town of Socchieve.
