= Tramonti =

Tramonti is the name of several areas in Italy:

- Tramonti, Campania
- Tramonti di Sotto, Pordenone
- Tramonti di Sopra, Pordenone
