= Gianfrancesco da Tolmezzo =

Italian painter (1450–1510)

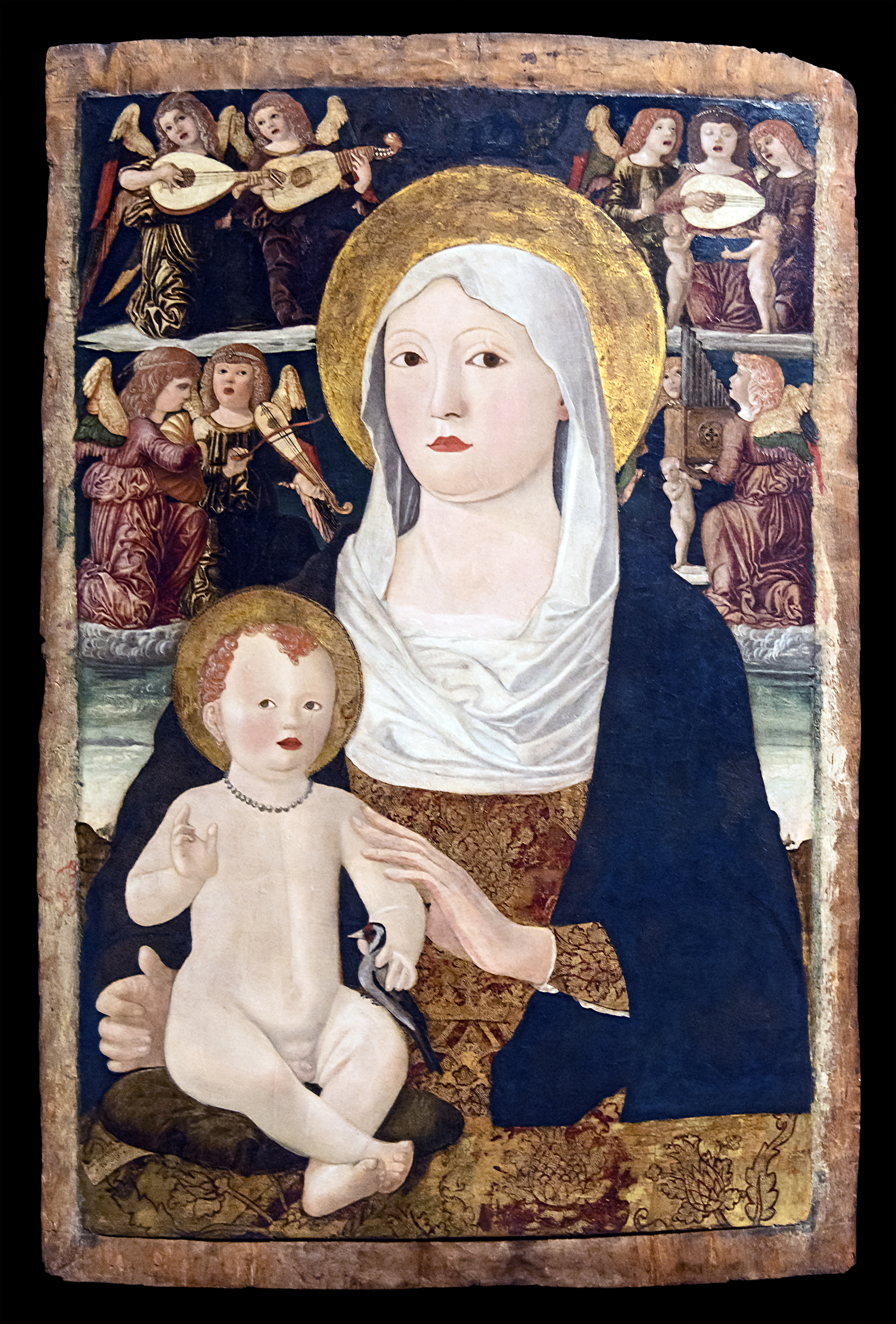
Madonna with Child, Gallerie dell'Accademia, Venice.

Gianfrancesco da Tolmezzo, also known as Gianfranco del Zotto, was born in Socchieve and lived from 1450 to 1510. He is considered to be one of the founders of the Tolmezzo school of painting and was one of the leading exponents of Friulian art in the 15th century (the quattrocento in Italian). Works of his survive at the parish church of Provesano in San Giorgio della Richinvelda, and at Castel d'Aviano, Budoia, Pordenone, Cordenons, Vivaro, Forni di Sotto, Forni di Sopra, and his birth town of Socchieve.

The 12th-century church at San Nicolò di Comelico contains frescoes by da Tolmezzo which were recently examined by art historian Andrew Graham-Dixon in the BBC Two television programme Italy Unpacked.
