= Pitina =

Italian goat meat salume

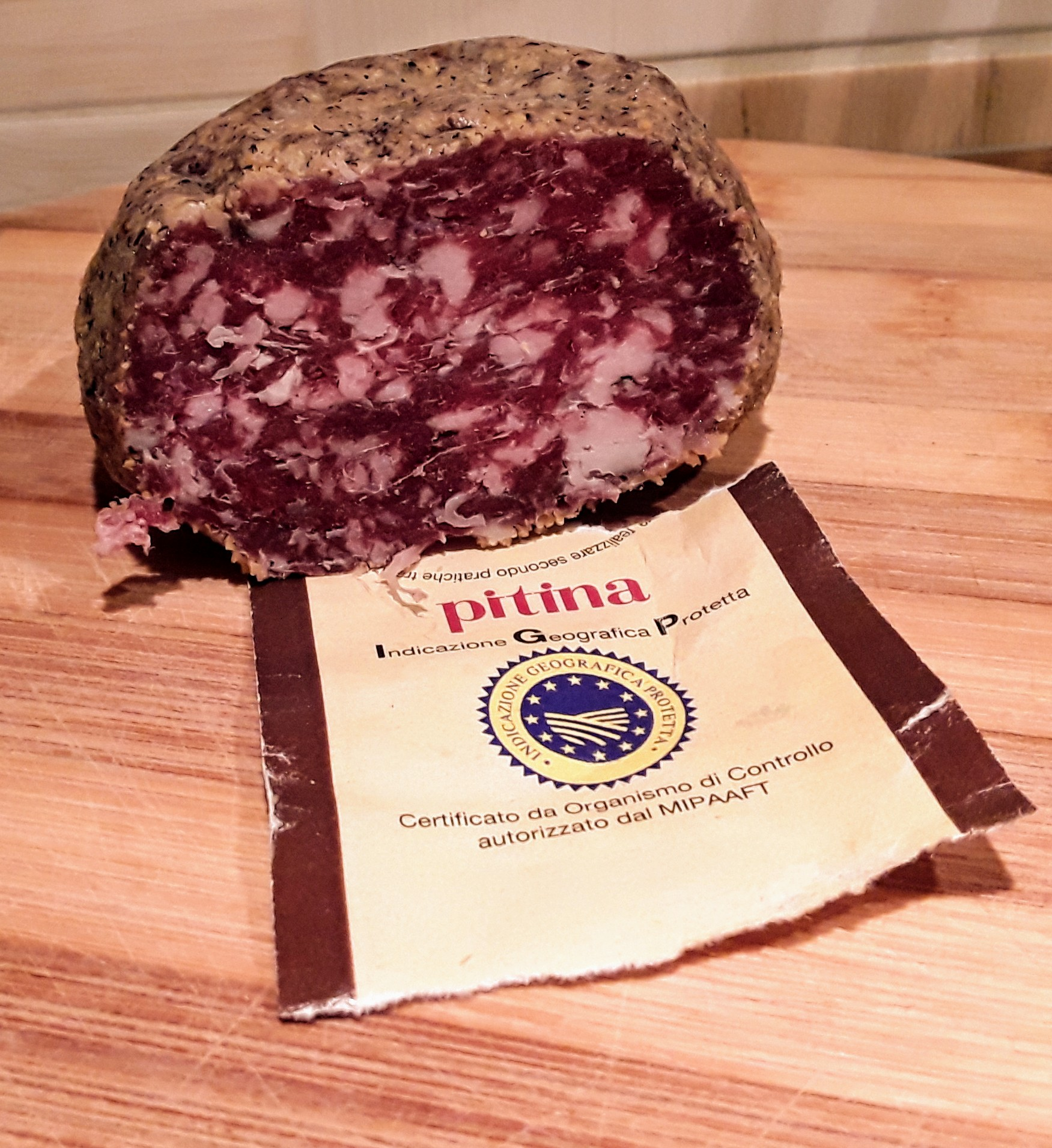
Pitina

Pitina, peta or petuccia is an Italian salume originating in the Dolomite valleys of Tramonti di Sopra and Tramonti di Sotto, and the River Cellina, in the northeastern province of Pordenone, Friuli-Venezia Giulia. It is not a true sausage, but a meatball made of smoked meats. The recipe was probably based on the impromptu need to preserve game. The preparation method did not require specialized equipment making it available to all homes, even the most isolated mountain huts.

Today the tradition is still alive and pitina is being produced commercially by several families in the province of Pordenone.

== Preparation ==
The meat of chamois (or goat) is mashed with a knife and a paste of garlic, salt, pepper and red wine is added. The mixture is blended in a mortar. The meat is then formed into meatballs, rolled in yellow corn (polenta) flour and then left to smoke for several days over a low fire of juniper wood.

== See also ==
Media related to Pitina at Wikimedia Commons

- List of dried foods
- List of smoked foods
