= Maurilio De Zolt =

Italian cross-country skier

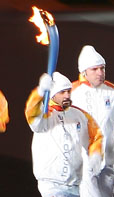
- De Zolt seen carrying the torch at the opening ceremony for the Torino Winter Olympics in 2006

Personal information
- Nationality: Italy
- Born: 29 September 1950 (age 75) San Pietro di Cadore, Italy

Sport
- Sport: Skiing
- Club: Vigili del Fuoco Belluno

World Cup career
- Seasons: 13 – (1982–1994)
- Indiv. starts: 57
- Indiv. podiums: 10
- Indiv. wins: 1
- Team starts: 13
- Team podiums: 9
- Team wins: 3
- Overall titles: 0 – (9th in 1991)
Medal record
Men's cross-country skiing
Representing Italy
Olympic Games
Gold medal – first place	1994 Lillehammer	4 × 10 km relay
Silver medal – second place	1988 Calgary	50 km freestyle
Silver medal – second place	1992 Albertville	50 km freestyle
World Championships
Gold medal – first place	1987 Oberstdorf	50 km freestyle
Silver medal – second place	1985 Seefeld	50 km
Silver medal – second place	1985 Seefeld	4 × 10 km relay
Silver medal – second place	1993 Falun	4 × 10 km relay
Bronze medal – third place	1985 Seefeld	15 km
Bronze medal – third place	1991 Val di Fiemme	50 km freestyle

Maurilio De Zolt (born 29 September 1950 in San Pietro di Cadore, Province of Belluno) is an Italian former cross-country skier who competed internationally from 1977 to 1997. His best-known victory was part of the 4 × 10 km relay team that upset Norway at the 1994 Winter Olympics in Lillehammer, when he was 43 years old. He also won two silver medals in the Winter Olympics at 50 km (1988, 1992).

== Biography ==
De Zolt also won six medals at the FIS Nordic World Ski Championships, including one gold (50 km: 1987), three silvers (50 km: 1985, 4 × 10 km relay: 1985, 1993), and two bronzes (15 km: 1985, 50 km: 1991).

At the opening ceremony for the 2006 Winter Olympics in Turin on 10 February, he and his 4 × 10 km relay teammates (Giorgio Vanzetta, Marco Albarello, and Silvio Fauner) who won the gold at the 1994 Winter Olympics in Lillehammer, were among the last carriers of the Olympic torch before it was lit by fellow Italian cross-country skier Stefania Belmondo.

De Zolt was formerly a firefighter, and once placed second in ladder climbing at the World Fireman Championships.

== Cross-country skiing results ==
All results are sourced from the International Ski Federation (FIS).

=== Olympic Games ===
- 3 medals – (1 gold, 2 silver)

Year	Age	10 km	15 km	Pursuit	30 km	50 km	4 × 10 km relay
1980	29	—N/a	31	—N/a	20	DNF	6
1984	33	—N/a	9	—N/a	9	22	7
1988	37	—N/a	6	—N/a	—	Silver	5
1992	41	58	—N/a	DNF	—	Silver	—
1994	43	—	—N/a	—	5	7	Gold

=== World Championships ===
- 6 medals – (1 gold, 3 silver, 2 bronze)

Year	Age	10 km	15 km classical	15 km freestyle	Pursuit	30 km	50 km	4 × 10 km relay
1978	27	—N/a	—	—N/a	—N/a	17	42	11
1982	31	—N/a	17	—N/a	—N/a	13	8	—
1985	34	—N/a	Bronze	—N/a	—N/a	—	Silver	Silver
1987	36	—N/a	14	—N/a	—N/a	—	Gold	5
1989	38	—N/a	12	—	—N/a	—	7	—
1991	40	—	—N/a	5	—N/a	18	Bronze	4
1993	42	—	—N/a	—N/a	—	8	12	Silver

=== World Cup ===
==== Season standings ====
Season	Age	Overall
1982	31	13
1983	32	30
1984	33	22
1985	34	13
1986	35	28
1987	36	21
1988	37	12
1989	38	37
1990	39	25
1991	40	9
1992	41	12
1993	42	16
1994	43	15

==== Individual podiums ====
- 1 victory
- 10 podiums

No.	Season	Date	Location	Race	Level	Place
1	1981–82	7 March 1982	Lahti, Finland	50 km Individual	World Cup	3rd
2	1984–85	22 January 1985	Seefeld, Austria	15 km Individual	World Championships^{[1]}	3rd
3	1984–85	27 January 1985	Seefeld, Austria	50 km Individual	World Championships^{[1]}	2nd
4	1985–86	14 February 1986	Oberstdorf, West Germany	50 km Individual F	World Cup	3rd
5	1986–87	21 February 1987	Oberstdorf, West Germany	50 km Individual F	World Championships^{[1]}	1st
6	1987–88	27 February 1988	Calgary, Canada	50 km Individual F	Olympic Games^{[1]}	2nd
7	1987–88	19 March 1988	Oslo, Norway	50 km Individual F	World Cup	3rd
8	1989–90	17 December 1989	Canmore, Canada	50 km Individual C	World Cup	3rd
9	1990–91	17 February 1991	Val di Fiemme, Italy	50 km Individual F	World Championships^{[1]}	3rd
10	1991–92	22 February 1992	Albertville, France	50 km Individual F	Olympic Games^{[1]}	2nd

==== Team podiums ====
- 3 victories
- 9 podiums

No.	Season	Date	Location	Race	Level	Place	Teammates
1	1984–85	24 January 1985	Seefeld, Austria	4 × 10 km Relay	World Championships^{[1]}	2nd	Albarello / Vanzetta / Ploner
2	1984–85	10 March 1985	Falun, Sweden	4 × 10 km Relay	World Cup	1st	Walder / Barco / Vanzetta
3	1985–86	13 March 1986	Oslo, Norway	4 × 10 km Relay F	World Cup	2nd	Albarello / Walder / Vanzetta
4	1986–87	19 March 1987	Oslo, Norway	4 × 10 km Relay C	World Cup	3rd	Vanzetta / Albarello / Pulie
5	1987–88	13 March 1988	Falun, Sweden	4 × 10 km Relay F	World Cup	3rd	Albarello / Vanzetta / Barco
6	1989–90	1 March 1990	Lahti, Finland	4 × 10 km Relay C/F	World Cup	1st	Fauner / Vanzetta / Runggaldier
7	1992–93	26 February 1993	Falun, Sweden	4 × 10 km Relay C/F	World Championships^{[1]}	2nd	Albarello / Vanzetta / Fauner
8	1993–94	22 February 1994	Lillehammer, Norway	4 × 10 km Relay C/F	Olympic Games^{[1]}	1st	Albarello / Vanzetta / Fauner
9	1993–94	13 March 1994	Falun, Sweden	4 × 10 km Relay F	World Cup	2nd	Barco / Vanzetta / Fauner

Note: ^{1} Until the 1999 World Championships and the 1994 Olympics, World Championship and Olympic races were included in the World Cup scoring system.
