= Dal Zotto =

Dal Zotto or Del Zotto is an Italian surname literally meaning "descendant of Zotto", "of Zottos". Notable people with the surname include:

- Dauferio Epifani Del Zotto (c.1026-1087), birth name of Pope Victor III
- Antonio Dal Zòtto (1841–1918), Italian sculptor
- Fabio Dal Zotto (born 1957), Italian fencer
- Gianfranco del Zotto or Gianfrancesco da Tolmezzo (1450–1510), Italian painter
- Renan Dal Zotto (born 1960), Brazilian volleyball player
- Michael Del Zotto (born 1990), Canadian ice hockey defenceman
