= Giuseppe Ploner =

Personal information
- Nationality: Italy
- Born: 30 January 1959 (age 67) Santa Cristina Gherdëina, Italy

Sport
- Sport: Skiing
- Club: C.S. Carabinieri

World Cup career
- Seasons: 4 – (1982–1983, 1985, 1989)
- Indiv. starts: 14
- Indiv. podiums: 0
- Team starts: 1
- Team podiums: 1
- Team wins: 0
- Overall titles: 0 – (29th in 1982)
Medal record
Men's cross-country skiing
Representing Italy
World Championships
Silver medal – second place	1985 Seefeld	4 × 10 km relay

Giuseppe Nicolò Ploner (born January 30, 1959, in Santa Cristina Gherdëina) is a former Italian cross-country skier who competed from 1982 to 1989.

== Biography ==
Ploner won a silver medal in the 4 × 10 km relay at the 1985 FIS Nordic World Ski Championships. His best individual finish was eight in the 15 km event at the 1982 FIS Nordic World Ski Championships. He is member of the Centro Sportivo Carabinieri and of the Sci Club Gardena.

== Cross-country skiing results ==
All results are sourced from the International Ski Federation (FIS).

=== World Championships ===
- 1 medal – (1 silver)

Year	Age	15 km classical	15 km freestyle	30 km	50 km	4 × 10 km relay
1982	23	8	—N/a	—	—	
1985	26	15	—N/a	9	—	Silver
1989	30	35	—	20	—	—

=== World Cup ===
==== Season standings ====
Season	Age	Overall
1982	23	29
1983	24	36
1985	26	33
1989	30	NC

==== Team podiums ====
- 1 podium

No.	Season	Date	Location	Race	Level	Place	Teammates
1	1984–85	24 January 1985	Seefeld, Austria	4 × 10 km Relay	World Championships^{[1]}	2nd	Albarello / Vanzetta / De Zolt

Note: ^{1} Until the 1999 World Championships and the 1994 Olympics, World Championship and Olympic races were included in the World Cup scoring system.
