= Giorgio Vanzetta =

Italian cross-country skier

Personal information
- Nationality: Italy
- Born: 9 October 1959 (age 66) Cavalese, Italy

Sport
- Sport: Skiing
- Club: G.S. Fiamme Gialle

World Cup career
- Seasons: 17 – (1982–1998)
- Indiv. starts: 92
- Indiv. podiums: 3
- Indiv. wins: 0
- Team starts: 24
- Team podiums: 11
- Team wins: 3
- Overall titles: 0 – (9th in 1982)
Medal record
Men's cross-country skiing
Representing Italy
Olympic Games
Gold medal – first place	1994 Lillehammer	4 × 10 km relay
Silver medal – second place	1992 Albertville	4 × 10 km relay
Bronze medal – third place	1992 Albertville	10 km + 15 km combined pursuit
Bronze medal – third place	1992 Albertville	50 km freestyle
World Championships
Silver medal – second place	1985 Seefeld	4 × 10 km relay
Silver medal – second place	1993 Falun	4 × 10 km relay

Giorgio Vanzetta (born 9 October 1959 in Cavalese) is an Italian former cross-country skier who competed from 1980 to 2002. His best-known victory was part of the 4 × 10 km relay team that upset Norway at the 1994 Winter Olympics in Lillehammer. He also won three medals at the 1992 Winter Olympics in Albertville with a silver in the 4 × 10 km relay and bronzes in the 10 km + 15 km combined pursuit and 50 km.

Vanzetta also won two silver medals in the 4 × 10 km relay (1985, 1993) at the Nordic skiing World Championships. His sister, Bice, also competed in cross-country skiing from 1986 to 1994.

At the Opening Ceremony for the 2006 Winter Olympics in Turin on 10 February, he and his 4 × 10 km relay teammates (Maurilio De Zolt, Marco Albarello, and Silvio Fauner) who won the gold at the 1994 Winter Olympics in Lillehammer, were among the last carriers of the Olympic torch before it was lit by fellow Italian cross-country skier Stefania Belmondo.

== Cross-country skiing results ==
All results are sourced from the International Ski Federation (FIS).

=== Olympic Games ===
- 4 medals – (1 gold, 1 silver, 2 bronze)

Year	Age	10 km	15 km	Pursuit	30 km	50 km	4 × 10 km relay
1980	20	—N/a	34	—N/a	—	—	6
1984	24	—N/a	14	—N/a	24	30	7
1988	28	—N/a	10	—N/a	5	—	5
1992	32	7	—N/a	Bronze	—	Bronze	Silver
1994	34	15	—N/a	9	14	8	Gold

=== World Championships ===
- 2 medals – (2 silver)

Year	Age	10 km	15 km classical	15 km freestyle	Pursuit	30 km	50 km	4 × 10 km relay
1982	22	—N/a	—	—N/a	—N/a	9	—	—
1985	25	—N/a	4	—N/a	—N/a	7	—	Silver
1987	27	—N/a	7	—N/a	—N/a	9	14	5
1989	29	—N/a	14	28	—N/a	—	—	7
1991	31	11	—N/a	4	—N/a	23	—	4
1993	33	10	—N/a	—N/a	7	—	11	Silver
1995	35	—	—N/a	—N/a	—	—	4	—
1997	37	—	—N/a	—N/a	—	—	11	—

=== World Cup ===
==== Season standings ====
Season	Age			
Season	Age	Overall	Long Distance	Sprint
1982	22	9	—N/a	—N/a
1983	23	34	—N/a	—N/a
1984	24	49	—N/a	—N/a
1985	25	22	—N/a	—N/a
1986	26	12	—N/a	—N/a
1987	27	18	—N/a	—N/a
1988	28	24	—N/a	—N/a
1989	29	25	—N/a	—N/a
1990	30	17	—N/a	—N/a
1991	31	21	—N/a	—N/a
1992	32	11	—N/a	—N/a
1993	33	12	—N/a	—N/a
1994	34	19	—N/a	—N/a
1995	35	41	—N/a	—N/a
1996	36	28	—N/a	—N/a
1997	37	34	35	26
1998	38	NC	NC	—

==== Individual podiums ====
- 3 podiums

No.	Season	Date	Location	Race	Level	Place
1	1985–86	2 March 1986	Lahti, Finland	15 km Individual F	World Cup	3rd
2	1991–92	15 February 1992	Albertville, France	15 km Pursuit F	Olympic Games^{[1]}	3rd
3	1991–92	22 February 1992	Albertville, France	50 km Individual F	Olympic Games^{[1]}	3rd

==== Team podiums ====
- 3 victories
- 11 podiums

No.	Season	Date	Location	Race	Level	Place	Teammates
1	1984–85	24 January 1985	Seefeld, Austria	4 × 10 km Relay	World Championships^{[1]}	2nd	Albarello / De Zolt / Ploner
2	1984–85	10 March 1985	Falun, Sweden	4 × 10 km Relay	World Cup	1st	Walder / Barco / De Zolt
3	1985–86	13 March 1986	Oslo, Norway	4 × 10 km Relay F	World Cup	2nd	Albarello / Walder / De Zolt
4	1986–87	19 March 1987	Oslo, Norway	4 × 10 km Relay C	World Cup	3rd	De Zolt / Albarello / Pulie
5	1987–88	13 March 1988	Falun, Sweden	4 × 10 km Relay F	World Cup	3rd	Albarello / De Zolt / Barco
6	1989–90	1 March 1990	Lahti, Finland	4 × 10 km Relay C/F	World Cup	1st	Fauner / De Zolt / Runggaldier
7	1991–92	18 February 1992	Albertville, France	4 × 10 km Relay C/F	Olympic Games^{[1]}	2nd	Pulie / Albarello / Fauner
8	1992–93	26 February 1993	Falun, Sweden	4 × 10 km Relay C/F	World Championships^{[1]}	2nd	De Zolt / Albarello / Fauner
9	1993–94	22 February 1994	Lillehammer, Norway	4 × 10 km Relay C/F	Olympic Games^{[1]}	1st	De Zolt / Albarello / Fauner
10	1993–94	13 March 1994	Falun, Sweden	4 × 10 km Relay F	World Cup	2nd	Barco / De Zolt / Fauner
11	1995–96	13 January 1996	Nové Město, Czech Republic	4 × 10 km Relay C	World Cup	3rd	Maj / Valbusa / Godioz

Note: ^{1} Until the 1999 World Championships and the 1994 Olympics, World Championship and Olympic races were included in the World Cup scoring system.
