= Giuseppe Pulie =

Italian cross-country skier

Personal information
- Nationality: Italy
- Born: 26 December 1964 (age 61) Auronzo di Cadore, Italy

Sport
- Sport: Skiing
- Club: Fiamme Gialle

World Cup career
- Seasons: 6 – (1988, 1991–1995)
- Indiv. starts: 17
- Indiv. podiums: 0
- Team starts: 2
- Team podiums: 2
- Team wins: 0
- Overall titles: 0 – (49th in 1993)
Medal record
Men's cross-country skiing
Representing Italy
Olympic Games
Silver medal – second place	1992 Albertville	4 × 10 km relay

Giuseppe Pulie (born 26 December 1964) is a former Italian cross-country skier who competed from 1988 to 1996. He won a silver medal in the 4 × 10 km relay at the 1992 Winter Olympics in Albertville.

Pulie's best finish at the Nordic skiing World Championships was 14th in the 10 km event in 1991. His best finish in any race was seventh at a 1996 event in Austria.

== Cross-country skiing results ==
All results are sourced from the International Ski Federation (FIS).

=== Olympic Games ===
- 1 medal – (1 silver)

Year	Age	10 km	Pursuit	30 km	50 km	4 × 10 km relay
1992	27	—	—	16	—	Silver

=== World Championships ===
Year	Age	10 km	15 km	Pursuit	30 km	50 km	4 × 10 km relay
1991	26	14	—	—N/a	—	—	—
1993	28	—	—N/a	—	17	—	—

=== World Cup ===
==== Season standings ====
Season	Age	Overall
1988	23	53
1991	26	NC
1992	27	NC
1993	28	49
1994	29	NC
1995	30	NC

==== Team podiums ====
- 2 podiums

No.	Season	Date	Location	Race	Level	Place	Teammates
1	1986–87	19 March 1987	Oslo, Norway	4 × 10 km Relay C	World Cup	3rd	De Zolt / Vanzetta / Albarello
2	1991–92	18 February 1992	Albertville, France	4 × 10 km Relay C/F	Olympic Games^{[1]}	2nd	Albarello / Vanzetta / Fauner

Note: ^{1} Until the 1994 Olympics, Olympic races were included in the World Cup scoring system.
