= Lake dei Tramonti =

Artificial lake in Pordenone, Italy

Tramonti Lake
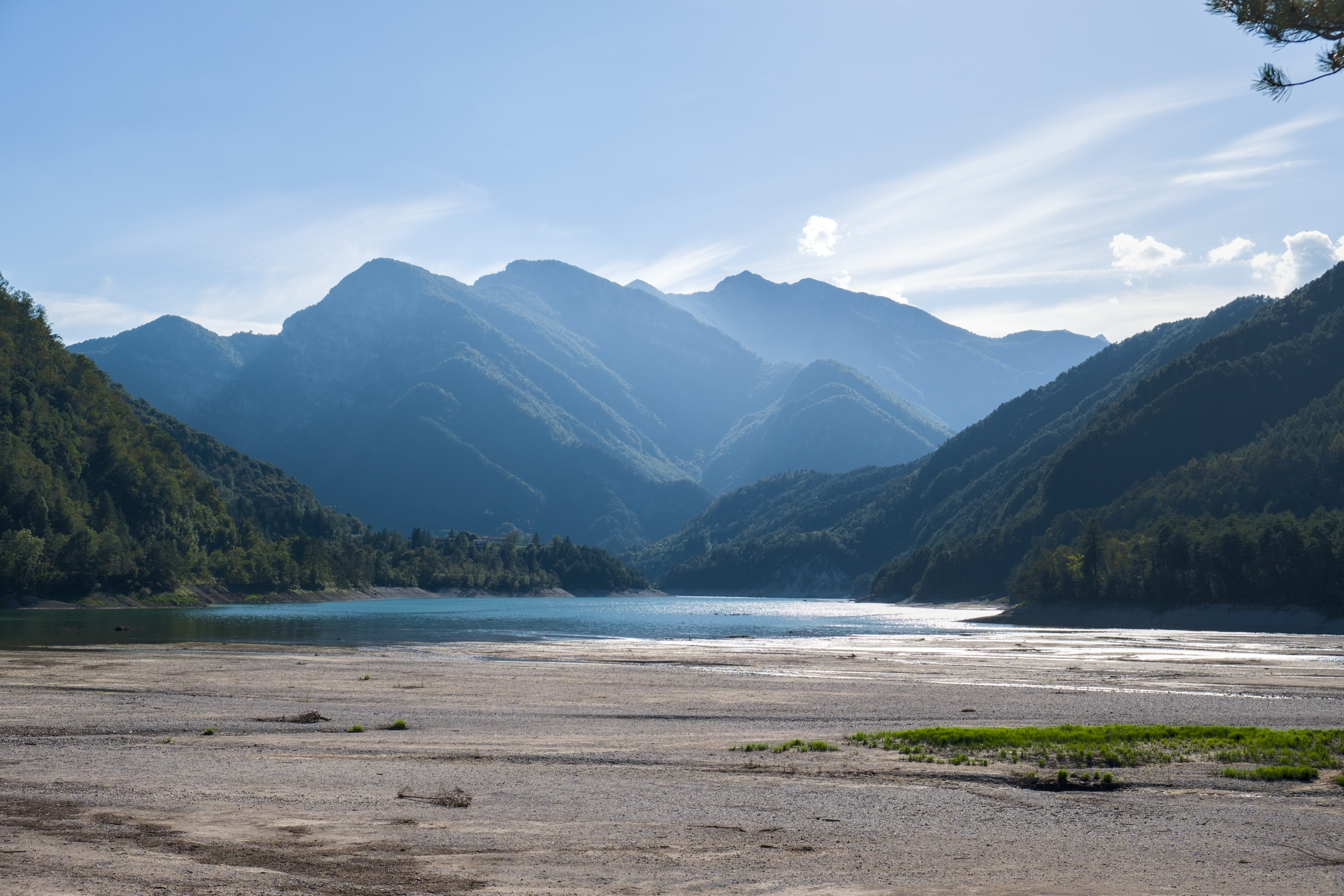
- View of Tramonti Lake from the northern shore

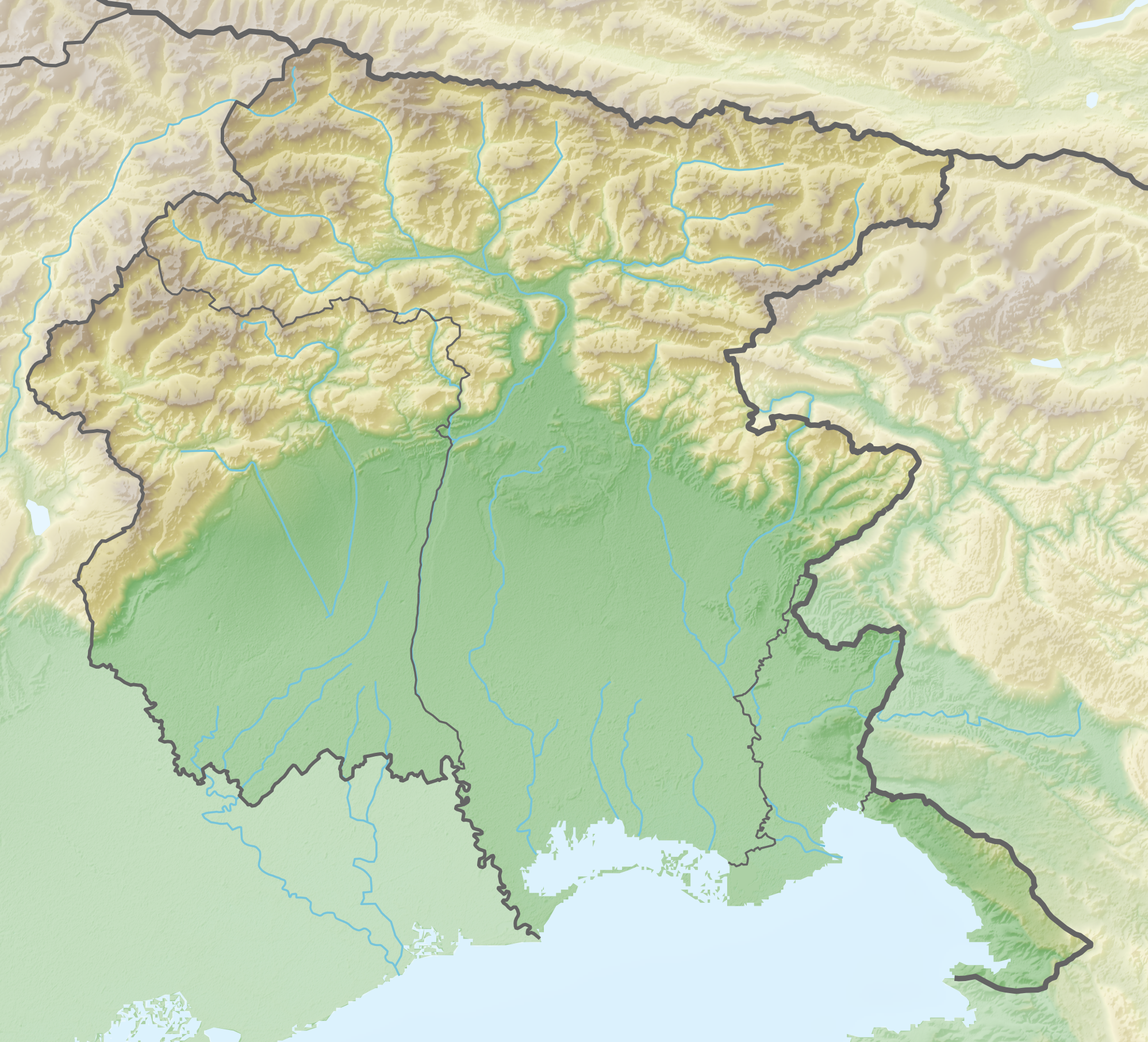
- Location within Friuli-Venezia Giulia
- Location: Italy
- Coordinates: 46.255°N 12.75°E
- Type: Artificial
- Primary inflows: Meduna
- Primary outflows: Meduna
- Basin countries: Italy
- Surface area: 1.6 km^{2} (0.62 sq mi)
- Max. depth: 70.25 m (230.5 ft)
- Water volume: 0.0025 km^{3} (0.00060 cu mi)
- Settlements: Tramonti di Sotto, Tramonti di Sopra

Tramonti Lake (also known as Redona Lake) is an artificial lake located in Val Tramontina between the municipalities of Tramonti di Sopra and Tramonti di Sotto, in the Province of Pordenone.

== Characteristics ==
The dam, a dome-shaped structure 50.6 m high, is located at the southern end of the lake, in the locality of Ponte Racli. The dam crest is accessible and is part of the road connecting the Strada statale 552 del Passo Rest (now a regional road), the hamlets of Chievolis, Inglagna, Posplata, and the other two nearby hydroelectric plants that utilize the Meduna river: Cà Selva Lake and Cà Zul Lake.

=== Technical Data ===
- Surface area: 1.6 km²
- Catchment basin area: 220 km²
- Altitude at maximum regulation: 313 m a.s.l.
- Altitude at maximum impoundment: 313 m a.s.l.
- Maximum catchment basin altitude: 2306 m a.s.l.
- Maximum depth: 70.25 m
- Volume: 25 million m³

== Construction ==
The construction work was completed in 1952, damming the Meduna in Val Tramontina and resulting in the abandonment of the old village of Movada, whose remains still emerge when the lake is dry.

The project was carried out by Saici (Società anonima agricola e industriale per la produzione italiana della cellulosa) to supply the large industrial complex at Torviscosa.

Today, the reservoir feeds the lower section of hydroelectric production on the Meduna River (i.e., the Meduno power plant) and ensures irrigation for the cultivated fields in the plain.

== Gallery ==
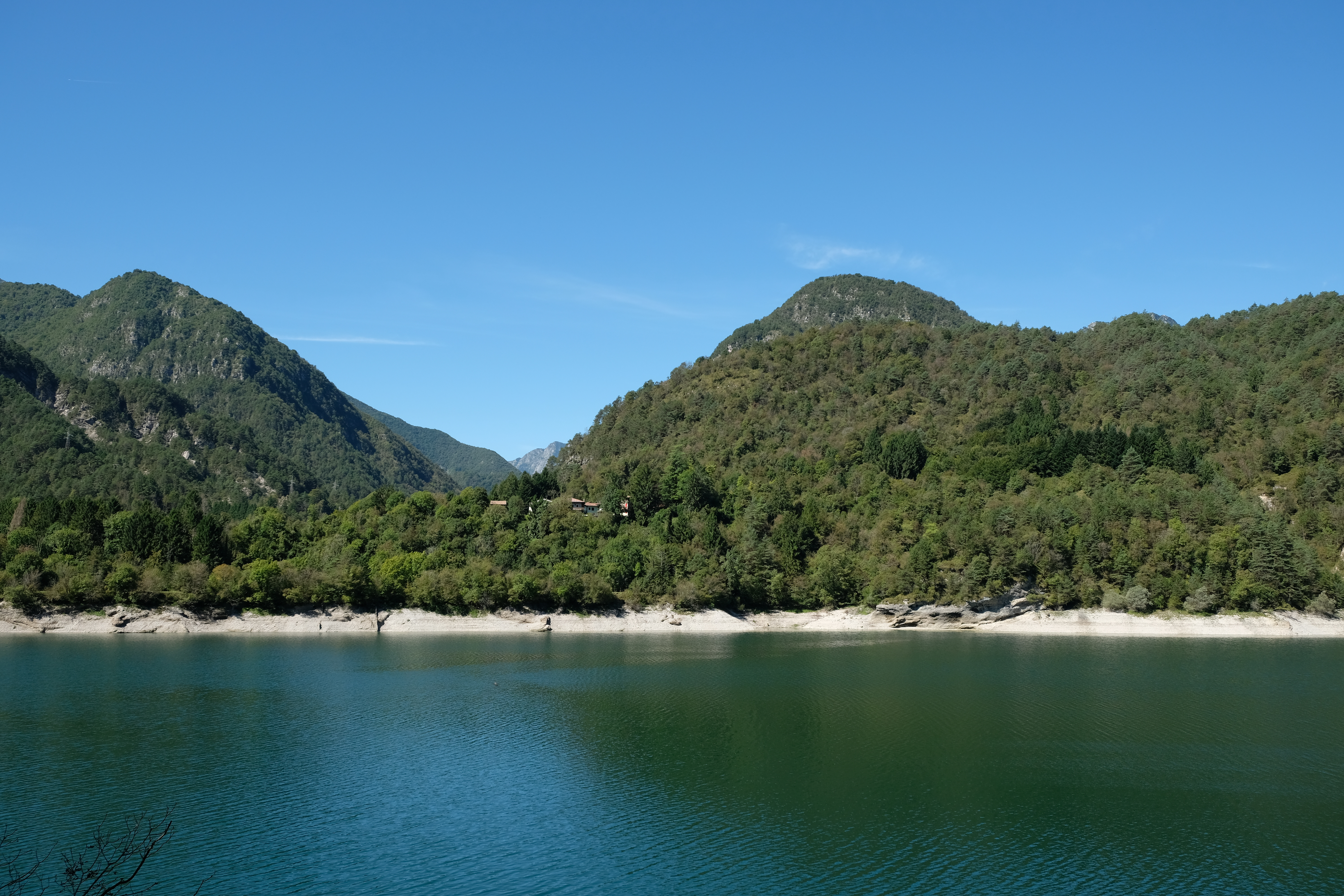
The lake and the locality of Muinta seen from the east side

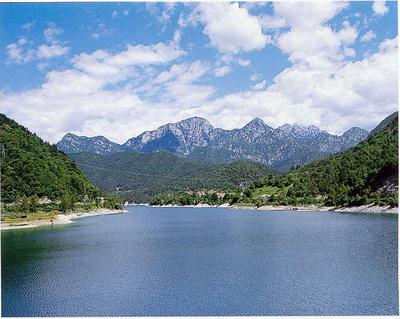
The lake with the Carnic Prealps in the background

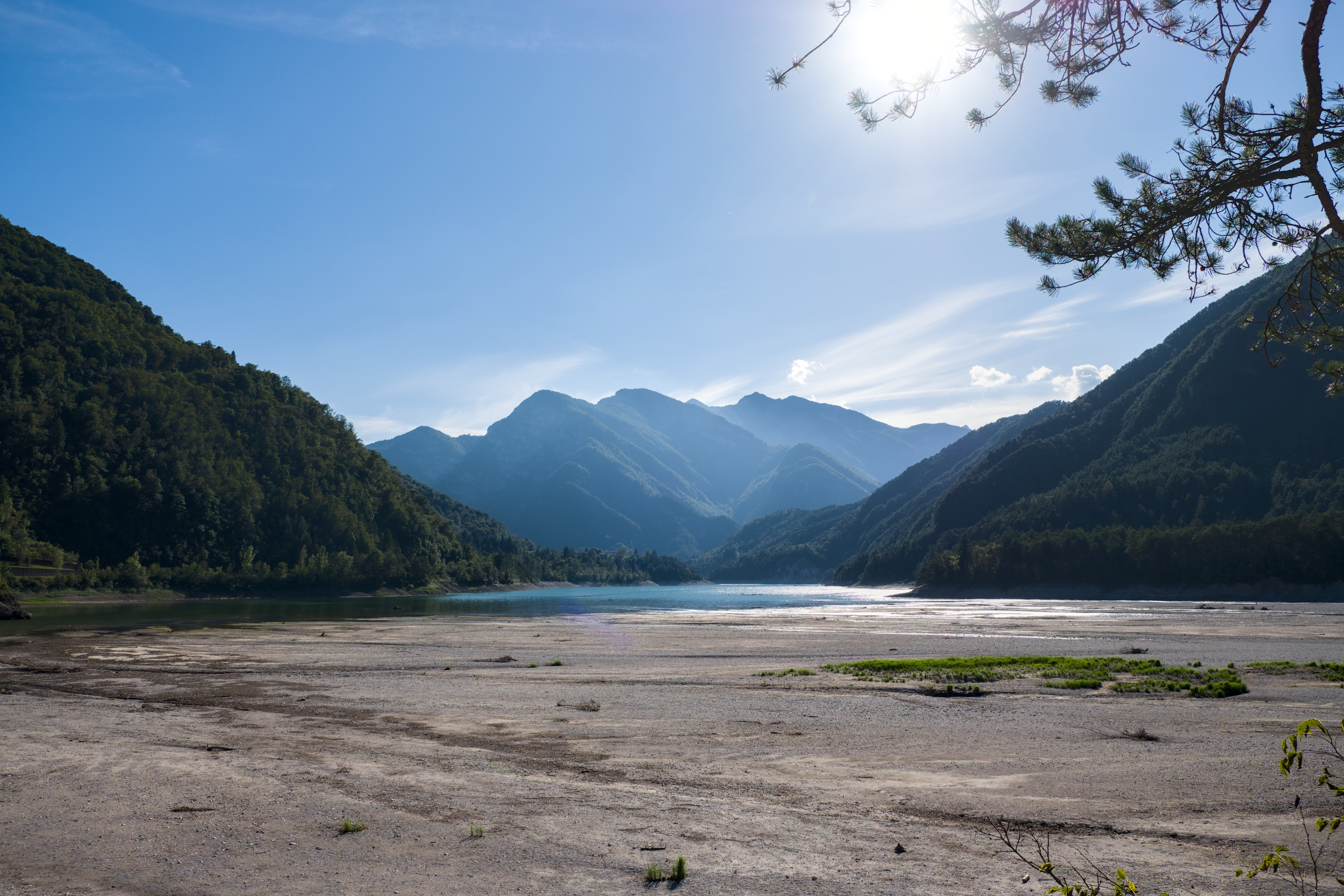
View of Tramonti Lake from the northern shore

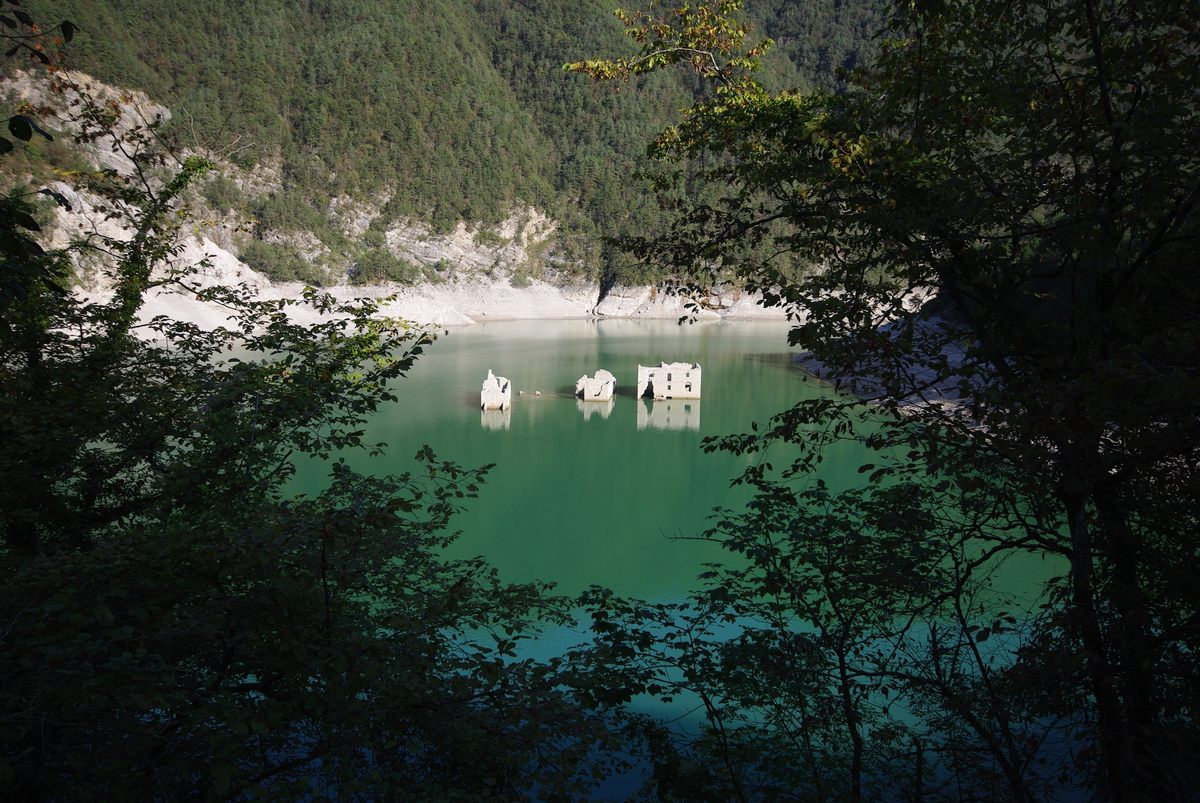
Tramonti Lake

== Bibliography ==
- Cima, Claudio (1996). I laghi delle dolomiti (2) [The Lakes of the Dolomites (2)] (in Italian). Edizioni Mediterranee. ISBN 88-272-1091-1.
