= Silvano Barco =

Italian cross country skier (born 1963)

Personal information
- Nationality: Italy
- Born: 5 May 1963 (age 63) Bormio, Italy

Sport
- Sport: Skiing
- Club: G.S. Fiamme Gialle

World Cup career
- Seasons: 11 – (1985–1986, 1988–1996)
- Indiv. starts: 40
- Indiv. podiums: 3
- Indiv. wins: 0
- Team starts: 8
- Team podiums: 3
- Team wins: 1
- Overall titles: 0 – (18th in 1988)

Silvano Barco (born 5 May 1963) is an Italian cross-country skier who competed from 1985 to 1996. He finished fifth in the 4 × 10 km relay at the 1988 Winter Olympics in Calgary.

== Career ==
His best World Cup finish was second twice, earning them in 1988 and 1991. Barco best finish at the FIS Nordic World Ski Championships was tenth twice in the 15 km event (1989, 1991). Barco earned two individual career victories, both in 1994 Continental Cup events at 15 km.

== Cross-country skiing results ==
All results are sourced from the International Ski Federation (FIS).

=== Olympic Games ===
Year	Age	15 km	30 km	50 km	4 × 10 km relay
1988	24	—	38	—	5

=== World Championships ===
Year	Age	10 km	15 km classical	15 km freestyle	30 km	50 km	4 × 10 km relay
1989	25	—N/a	—	10	—	19	7
1991	27	—	—N/a	10	—	DNF	4

=== World Cup ===
==== Season standings ====
Season	Age	Overall
1985	21	36
1986	22	NC
1988	24	18
1989	25	46
1990	26	26
1991	27	20
1992	28	NC
1993	29	73
1994	30	24
1995	31	47
1996	32	NC

==== Individual podiums ====
- 3 podiums

No.	Season	Date	Location	Race	Level	Place
1	1987–88	19 March 1988	Oslo, Norway	50 km Individual F	World Cup	2nd
2	1990–91	9 January 1991	Štrbské Pleso, Czechoslovakia	30 km Individual F	World Cup	2nd
3	1993–94	19 March 1994	Thunder Bay, Canada	50 km Individual F	World Cup	3rd

==== Team podiums ====
- 1 victory
- 3 podiums

No.	Season	Date	Location	Race	Level	Place	Teammates
1	1984–85	10 March 1985	Falun, Sweden	4 × 10 km Relay	World Cup	1st	Walder / De Zolt / Vanzetta
2	1987–88	13 March 1988	Falun, Sweden	4 × 10 km Relay F	World Cup	3rd	Albarello / Vanzetta / De Zolt
3	1993–94	13 March 1994	Falun, Sweden	4 × 10 km Relay F	World Cup	2nd	De Zolt / Vanzetta / Fauner
