= Fornes dialects =

Fornes (second syllable stressed) is the dialect native to Forni di Sopra and Forni di Sotto, two villages which, from AD 1300 to AD 1700, were governed separately from the surrounding areas by the Savorgnani family of Venice and known as 'I Forni Savorgnani'.

As the two villages are 9 km (over 5 miles) from each other and there was traditionally poor communication in the snowy months of the year, these villages' dialects diverged and are still markedly different both from each other and from the language spoken further down the mountains (Friulian). According to studies by some institutions which study Ladin languages these two dialects moved away from Friulian to become 'Raetic-Dolomitic-Ladin' similar to Ladin languages spoken in Grisons, Switzerland, while keeping Friulian characteristics..

To give one example, the word sheep (plural) translates as las minas in Forni di Sopra, lis fedis in Forni di Sotto, and lis pioris in Friuli. For comparison, the Italian is le pecore.
