= Marco Albarello =

Italian cross-country skier

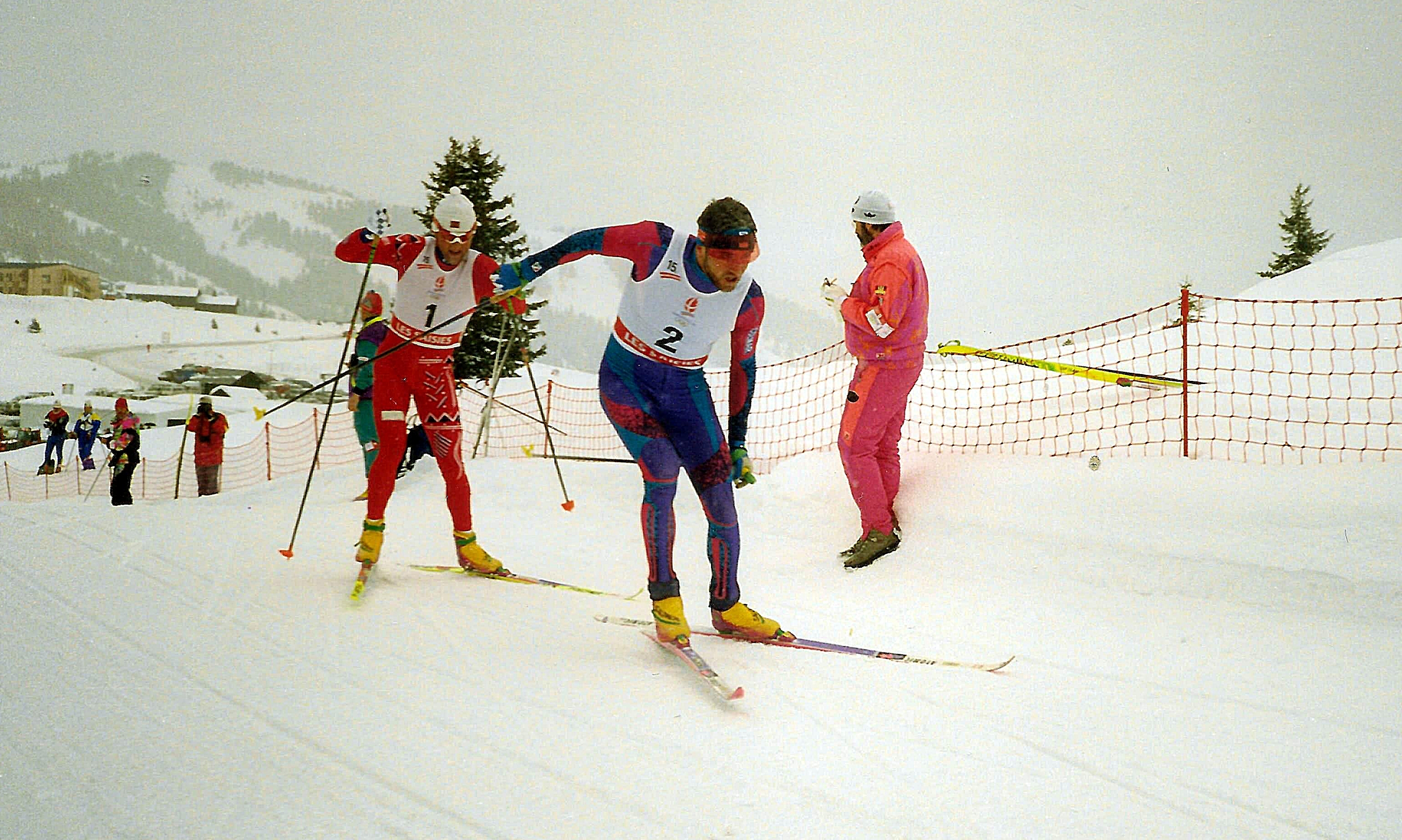

Personal information
- Nationality: Italy
- Born: 31 May 1960 (age 66) Aosta, Italy

Sport
- Sport: Skiing
- Club: C.S. Esercito

World Cup career
- Seasons: 17 – (1982–1998)
- Indiv. starts: 92
- Indiv. podiums: 6
- Indiv. wins: 2
- Team starts: 20
- Team podiums: 10
- Team wins: 2
- Overall titles: 0 – (5th in 1993)
Medal record
Men's cross-country skiing
Representing Italy
Olympic Games
Gold medal – first place	1994 Lillehammer	4 × 10 km relay
Silver medal – second place	1992 Albertville	10 km classical
Silver medal – second place	1992 Albertville	4 × 10 km relay
Silver medal – second place	1998 Nagano	4 × 10 km relay
Bronze medal – third place	1994 Lillehammer	10 km classical
World Championships
Gold medal – first place	1987 Oberstdorf	15 km classical
Silver medal – second place	1985 Seefeld	4 × 10 km relay
Silver medal – second place	1993 Falun	4 × 10 km relay
Bronze medal – third place	1995 Thunder Bay	4 × 10 km relay

Marco Albarello (born 31 May 1960) is an Italian former cross-country skier who competed from 1982 to 2002. He was born in Aosta. His best-known victory was part of the 4 × 10 km relay team that upset Norway at the 1994 Winter Olympics in Lillehammer. He also won four other medals at the Winter Olympics with three silvers (10 km: 1992; 4 × 10 km relay: 1992, 1998) and one bronze (10 km: 1994).

== Biography ==
Albarello also won four medals at the FIS Nordic World Ski Championships with one gold (15 km: 1987), two silvers (4 × 10 km relay: 1985, 1993), and one bronze (4 × 10 km relay: 1997).

At the Opening Ceremony for the 2006 Winter Olympics in Turin on 10 February, he and his 4 × 10 km relay teammates (Maurilio De Zolt, Giorgio Vanzetta, and Silvio Fauner) who won the gold at the 1994 Winter Olympics in Lillehammer, were among the last carriers of the Olympic torch before it was lit by fellow Italian cross-country skier Stefania Belmondo. Albarello was the coach of the Italian national cross-country ski team until May 2007. He is married to Silvana Domaine, and he has one son, Jacopo Albarello, and one daughter, Giorgia Carlotta Albarello.

== Cross-country skiing results ==
All results are sourced from the International Ski Federation (FIS).

=== Olympic Games ===
- 5 medals – (1 gold, 3 silver, 1 bronze)

Year	Age	10 km	15 km	Pursuit	30 km	50 km	4 × 10 km relay
1988	27	—N/a	9	—N/a	8	—	—
1992	31	Silver	—N/a	4	4	—	Silver
1994	33	Bronze	—N/a	10	—	—	Gold
1998	37	26	—N/a	DNS	7	—	Silver

=== World Championships ===
- 4 medals – (1 gold, 2 silver, 1 bronze)

Year	Age	10 km	15 km classical	15 km freestyle	Pursuit	30 km	50 km	4 × 10 km relay
1985	24	—N/a	17	—N/a	—N/a	—	—	Silver
1987	26	—N/a	Gold	—N/a	—N/a	14	—	5
1989	28	—N/a	17	—	—N/a	7	—	7
1991	30	21	—N/a	—	—N/a	12	—	4
1993	32	9	—N/a	—N/a	8	4	—	Silver
1995	34	19	—N/a	—N/a	DNS	23	—	Bronze
1997	36	25	—N/a	—N/a	DNF	—	DNF	—

=== World Cup ===
==== Season standings ====
Season	Age			
Season	Age	Overall	Long Distance	Sprint
1982	21	NC	—N/a	—N/a
1983	22	NC	—N/a	—N/a
1984	23	54	—N/a	—N/a
1985	24	49	—N/a	—N/a
1986	25	33	—N/a	—N/a
1987	26	21	—N/a	—N/a
1988	27	26	—N/a	—N/a
1989	28	31	—N/a	—N/a
1990	29	60	—N/a	—N/a
1991	30	9	—N/a	—N/a
1992	31	10	—N/a	—N/a
1993	32	5	—N/a	—N/a
1994	33	14	—N/a	—N/a
1995	34	20	—N/a	—N/a
1996	35	37	—N/a	—N/a
1997	36	35	48	21
1998	37	35	27	38

==== Individual podiums ====
- 2 victories
- 6 podiums

No.	Season	Date	Location	Race	Level	Place
1	1986–87	15 February 1987	Oberstdorf, West Germany	15 km Individual C	World Championships^{[1]}	1st
2	1990–91	15 December 1990	Davos, Switzerland	15 km Individual C	World Cup	2nd
3	1991–92	13 February 1992	Albertville, France	10 km Individual C	Olympic Games^{[1]}	2nd
4	1992–93	9 January 1993	Ulrichen, Switzerland	15 km Individual C	World Cup	1st
5	1992–93	19 March 1993	Štrbské Pleso, Slovakia	15 km Individual C	World Cup	2nd
6	1993–94	17 February 1994	Lillehammer, Norway	10 km Individual C	Olympic Games^{[1]}	3rd

==== Team podiums ====
- 2 victories
- 10 podiums

No.	Season	Date	Location	Race	Level	Place	Teammates
1	1984–85	24 January 1985	Seefeld, Austria	4 × 10 km Relay	World Championships^{[1]}	2nd	Vanzetta / De Zolt / Ploner
2	1985–86	13 March 1986	Oslo, Norway	4 × 10 km Relay F	World Cup	2nd	Walder / De Zolt / Vanzetta
3	1986–87	19 March 1987	Oslo, Norway	4 × 10 km Relay C	World Cup	3rd	De Zolt / Vanzetta / Pulie
4	1987–88	13 March 1988	Falun, Sweden	4 × 10 km Relay F	World Cup	3rd	Vanzetta / De Zolt / Barco
5	1991–92	18 February 1992	Albertville, France	4 × 10 km Relay C/F	Olympic Games^{[1]}	2nd	Pulie / Vanzetta / Fauner
6	1992–93	26 February 1993	Falun, Sweden	4 × 10 km Relay C/F	World Championships^{[1]}	2nd	De Zolt / Vanzetta / Fauner
7	1993–94	22 February 1994	Lillehammer, Norway	4 × 10 km Relay C/F	Olympic Games^{[1]}	1st	De Zolt / Vanzetta / Fauner
8	1994–95	15 January 1995	Nové Město, Czech Republic	4 × 10 km Relay C	World Cup	3rd	Maj / Fauner / Godioz
9	1995–96	25 February 1996	Trondheim, Norway	4 × 10 km Relay C/F	World Cup	2nd	Di Centa / Valbusa / Fauner
10	1995–96	1 March 1996	Lahti, Finland	4 × 10 km Relay C/F	World Cup	1st	Fauner / Maj / Valbusa

Note: ^{1} Until the 1999 World Championships and the 1994 Olympics, World Championship and Olympic races were included in the World Cup scoring system.
