= Albert Walder =

Italian cross country skier

Personal information
- Nationality: Italy
- Born: 9 November 1957 (age 68) Toblach, Italy

Sport
- Sport: Skiing
- Club: G.S. Forestale

World Cup career
- Seasons: 4 – (1985–1988)
- Indiv. starts: 13
- Indiv. podiums: 1
- Indiv. wins: 0
- Team starts: 4
- Team podiums: 2
- Team wins: 1
- Overall titles: 0 – (14th in 1987)

Albert Walder (born 9 November 1957, in Toblach) is a former Italian cross-country skier who competed from 1985 to 1988. He finished fifth in the 4 × 10 km relay at the 1988 Winter Olympics in Calgary.

Walder finished third in the 30 km class of the national men's championships of cross-country skiing. His best finish at the FIS Nordic World Ski Championships was eighth in the 50 km event at Oberstdorf in 1987. His best World Cup finish was in a 30 km event in Finland in 1987.

== Cross-country skiing results ==
All results are sourced from the International Ski Federation (FIS).

=== Olympic Games ===
Year	Age	15 km	30 km	50 km	4 × 10 km relay
1988	30	—	—	16	5

=== World Championships ===
Year	Age	15 km	30 km	50 km	4 × 10 km relay
1985	27	—	16	—	—
1987	29	—	—	8	5

=== World Cup ===
==== Season standings ====
Season	Age	Overall
1985	27	41
1986	28	21
1987	29	14
1988	30	30

==== Individual podiums ====
- 1 podium

No.	Season	Date	Location	Race	Level	Place
1	1986–87	1 March 1987	Lahti, Finland	30 km Individual F	World Cup	3rd

==== Team podiums ====
- 1 victory
- 2 podiums

No.	Season	Date	Location	Race	Level	Place	Teammates
1	1984–85	10 March 1985	Falun, Sweden	4 × 10 km Relay	World Cup	1st	Barco / De Zolt / Vanzetta
2	1985–86	13 March 1986	Oslo, Norway	4 × 10 km Relay F	World Cup	2nd	Albarello / De Zolt / Vanzetta
