= San Pietro di Cadore =

- Comune
- Comune di San Pietro di Cadore
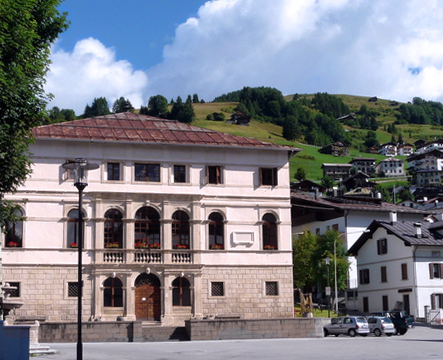

- Coat of arms

- Location within Italy Location within Veneto
- Coordinates: 46°34′N 12°35′E
- Country: Italy
- Region: Veneto
- Province: Belluno (BL)
- Frazioni: Costalta, Mare, Presenaio, Valle

Government
  - Mayor: Silvano Pontil Scala

Area
  - Total: 52.4 km^{2} (20.2 sq mi)

Population (Dec. 2004)
  - Total: 1,799
  - Density: 34.3/km^{2} (88.9/sq mi)
- Time zone: UTC+1 (CET)
  - Summer (DST): UTC+2 (CEST)
- Postal code: 32040
- Dialing code: 0435

San Pietro di Cadore (Ladin: San Pieru) is a comune (municipality) in the Province of Belluno in the Italian region of Veneto, located about 130 kilometres (81 mi) north of Venice and about 60 kilometres (37 mi) northeast of Belluno, on the border with Austria.

San Pietro di Cadore borders the following municipalities: Obertilliach (Austria), San Nicolò di Comelico, Santo Stefano di Cadore, Untertilliach (Austria).

In November 2007, its mayor announced that the town was launching an initiative to collect signatures for a petition in favour of seceding from Italy to instead join Austria.

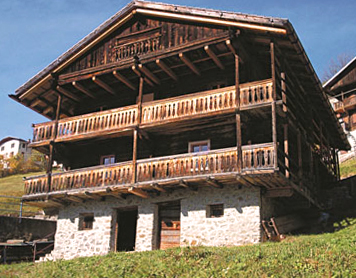
Typical house of the town
