= Tramonti di Sopra =

Tramonti di Sopra Vildisora (Friulian)
- Comune
- Comune di Tramonti di Sopra
- Coat of arms

- Location within Italy Location within Friuli-Venezia Giulia
- Coordinates: 46°19′N 12°48′E
- Country: Italy
- Region: Friuli-Venezia Giulia
- Province: Pordenone (PN)
- Frazioni: Maleon, Chievolis

Government
  - Mayor: Antonino Titolo

Area
  - Total: 123.9 km^{2} (47.8 sq mi)
- Elevation: 420 m (1,380 ft)

Population (31 December 2010)
  - Total: 385
  - Density: 3.11/km^{2} (8.05/sq mi)
- Demonym: Tramontini
- Time zone: UTC+1 (CET)
  - Summer (DST): UTC+2 (CEST)
- Postal code: 33090
- Dialing code: 0427
- Website: Official website

Tramonti di Sopra (Friulian: Tramonç Disore, locally Vildisora) is a comune (municipality) in the Regional decentralization entity of Pordenone in the Italian autonomous region of Friuli-Venezia Giulia, located about 110 kilometres (68 mi) northwest of Trieste and about 40 kilometres (25 mi) northeast of Pordenone.

Tramonti di Sopra is the traditional home of the pitina, a particular meat ball, smoked with aromas and herbs (i.e. juniper). Other local food include formaj dal cit, a typical cottage cheese flavour with pepper.

Tramonti di Sopra borders the following municipalities: Claut, Forni di Sotto, Frisanco, Meduno, Socchieve, Tramonti di Sotto.

== See also ==
- Lake dei Tramonti
