= Forni di Sotto =

Forni di Sotto For Disot (Friulian)
- Comune
- Comune di Forni di Sotto
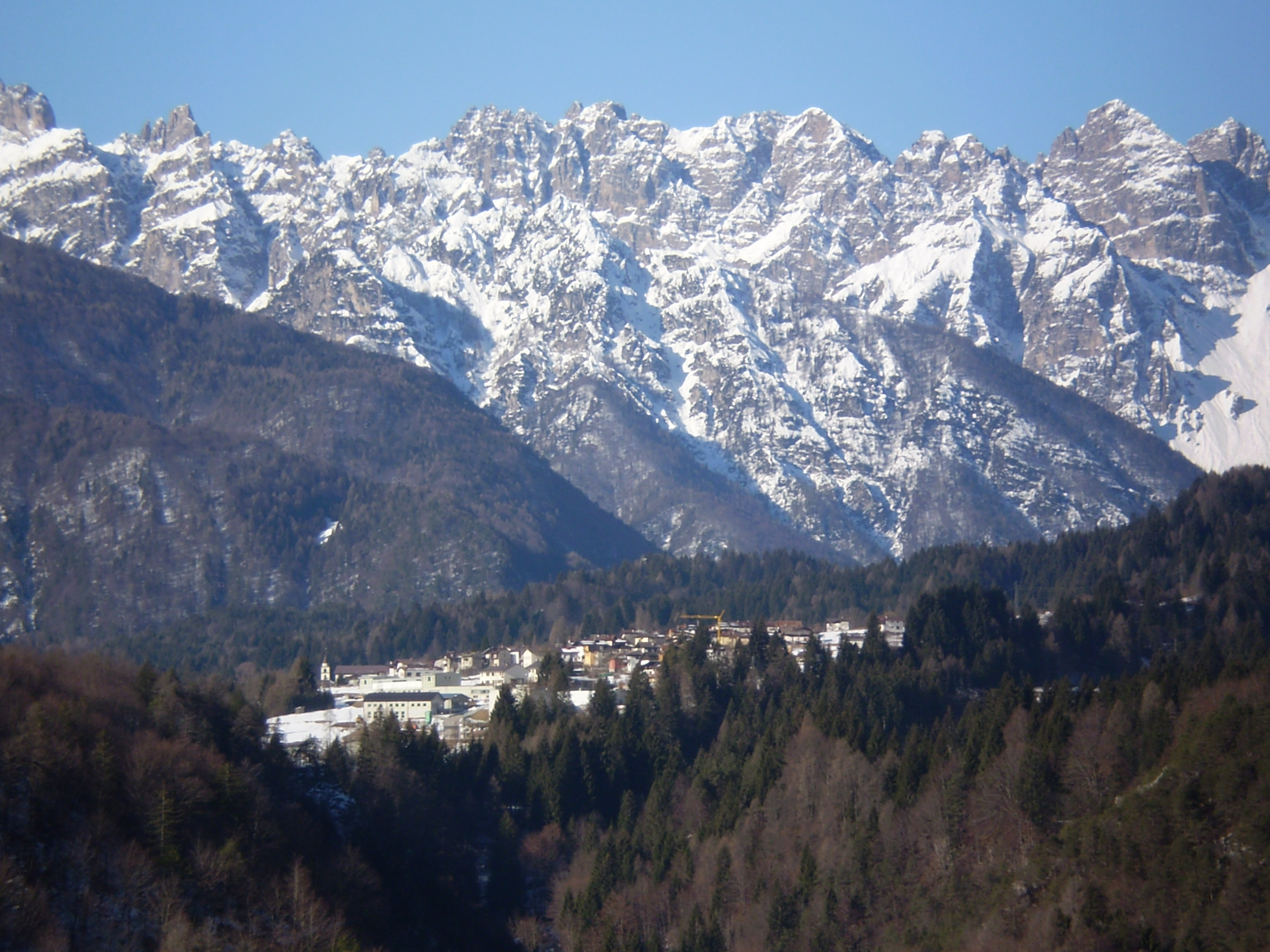
- Forni di Sotto in winter

- Location within Italy Location within Friuli-Venezia Giulia
- Coordinates: 46°24′N 12°40′E
- Country: Italy
- Region: Friuli-Venezia Giulia
- Province: Udine (UD)

Area
  - Total: 93.0 km^{2} (35.9 sq mi)

Population (Dec. 2004)
  - Total: 701
  - Density: 7.54/km^{2} (19.5/sq mi)
- Demonym: Fornesi
- Time zone: UTC+1 (CET)
  - Summer (DST): UTC+2 (CEST)
- Postal code: 33020
- Dialing code: 0433
- Website: Official website

Forni di Sotto (Fornes: For Disot) is a comune (municipality) in the Regional decentralization entity of Udine in the Italian region of Friuli-Venezia Giulia, located about 120 kilometres (75 mi) northwest of Trieste and about 60 kilometres (37 mi) northwest of Udine. As of 31 December 2004, it had a population of 701 and an area of 93.0 square kilometres (35.9 mi^{2}).

Forni di Sotto borders the following municipalities: Ampezzo, Claut, Forni di Sopra, Sauris, Socchieve, Tramonti di Sopra.

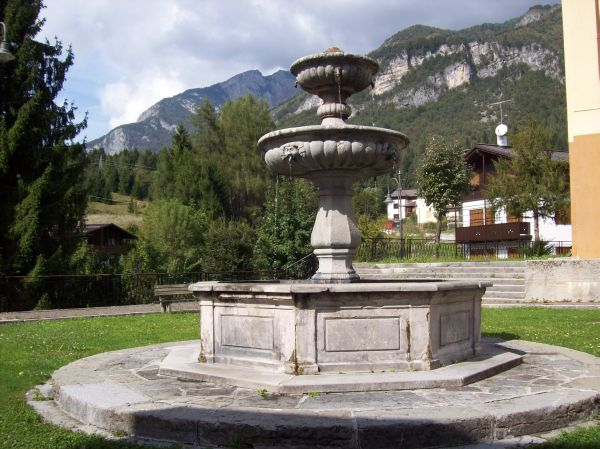
One of three nineteenth-century fountains

== Demographic evolution ==
Historical population

Year	Pop.	±%
1861	?	—
1871	1,879	—
1881	1,947	+3.6%
1901	1,816	−6.7%
1911	1,821	+0.3%

Year	Pop.	±%
1921	1,888	+3.7%
1931	1,717	−9.1%
1936	1,446	−15.8%
1951	1,598	+10.5%
1961	1,406	−12.0%

Year	Pop.	±%
1971	878	−37.6%
1981	877	−0.1%
1991	761	−13.2%
2001	716	−5.9%

Source: Data from ISTAT
