= Tramonti di Sotto =

Tramonti di Sotto Vildisot (Friulian)
- Comune
- Comune di Tramonti di Sotto
- Location within Italy Location within Friuli-Venezia Giulia
- Coordinates: 46°17′N 12°48′E
- Country: Italy
- Region: Friuli-Venezia Giulia
- Province: Pordenone (PN)

Area
  - Total: 84.6 km^{2} (32.7 sq mi)
- Elevation: 366 m (1,201 ft)

Population (Dec. 2004)
  - Total: 444
  - Density: 5.25/km^{2} (13.6/sq mi)
- Time zone: UTC+1 (CET)
  - Summer (DST): UTC+2 (CEST)
- Postal code: 33090
- Dialing code: 0427

Tramonti di Sotto (Friulian: Tramonç Disot, locally Vildisot) is a comune (municipality) in the Regional decentralization entity of Pordenone, in the Italian region of Friuli-Venezia Giulia. It is located about 110 kilometres (68 mi) northwest of Trieste and about 35 kilometres (22 mi) northeast of Pordenone. As of 31 December 2004, it had a population of 444 and an area of 84.6 square kilometres (32.7 mi^{2}).

Tramonti di Sotto borders the following municipalities: Castelnovo del Friuli, Clauzetto, Frisanco, Meduno, Preone, Socchieve, Tramonti di Sopra, Travesio, Verzegnis, Vito d'Asio.

== Demographic evolution ==
Historical population

Year	Pop.	±%
1861	?	—
1871	2,681	—
1881	3,016	+12.5%
1901	2,851	−5.5%
1911	3,109	+9.0%

Year	Pop.	±%
1921	3,090	−0.6%
1931	2,434	−21.2%
1936	2,019	−17.1%
1951	1,952	−3.3%
1961	1,371	−29.8%

Year	Pop.	±%
1971	760	−44.6%
1981	679	−10.7%
1991	544	−19.9%
2001	440	−19.1%

Source: Data from ISTAT

== See also ==
- Lake dei Tramonti
