= Forni di Sopra =

Forni di Sopra For Disora (Friulian)
- Comune
- Comune di Forni di Sopra
- Location within Italy Location within Friuli-Venezia Giulia
- Coordinates: 46°25′N 12°35′E
- Country: Italy
- Region: Friuli-Venezia Giulia
- Province: Udine (UD)
- Frazioni: Andrazza, Cella, Vico

Government
  - Mayor: Iginio Coradazzi

Area
  - Total: 81 km^{2} (31 sq mi)
- Elevation: 907 m (2,976 ft)

Population (2018-01-01)
  - Total: 1,121
  - Density: 14/km^{2} (36/sq mi)
- Demonym: Fornesi
- Time zone: UTC+1 (CET)
  - Summer (DST): UTC+2 (CEST)
- Postal code: 33024
- Dialing code: 0433
- Patron saint: Madonna della Salute
- Saint day: November 21
- Website: Official website

Forni di Sopra (Friulian: For Disore, in the local Fornes dialect For Disora) is a town and comune (municipality) in the Regional decentralization entity of Udine in the region of Friuli-Venezia Giulia, northeast Italy. It is located on the Dolomite Alps mountain range in northeastern Italy, at the top of the Tagliamento river valley.

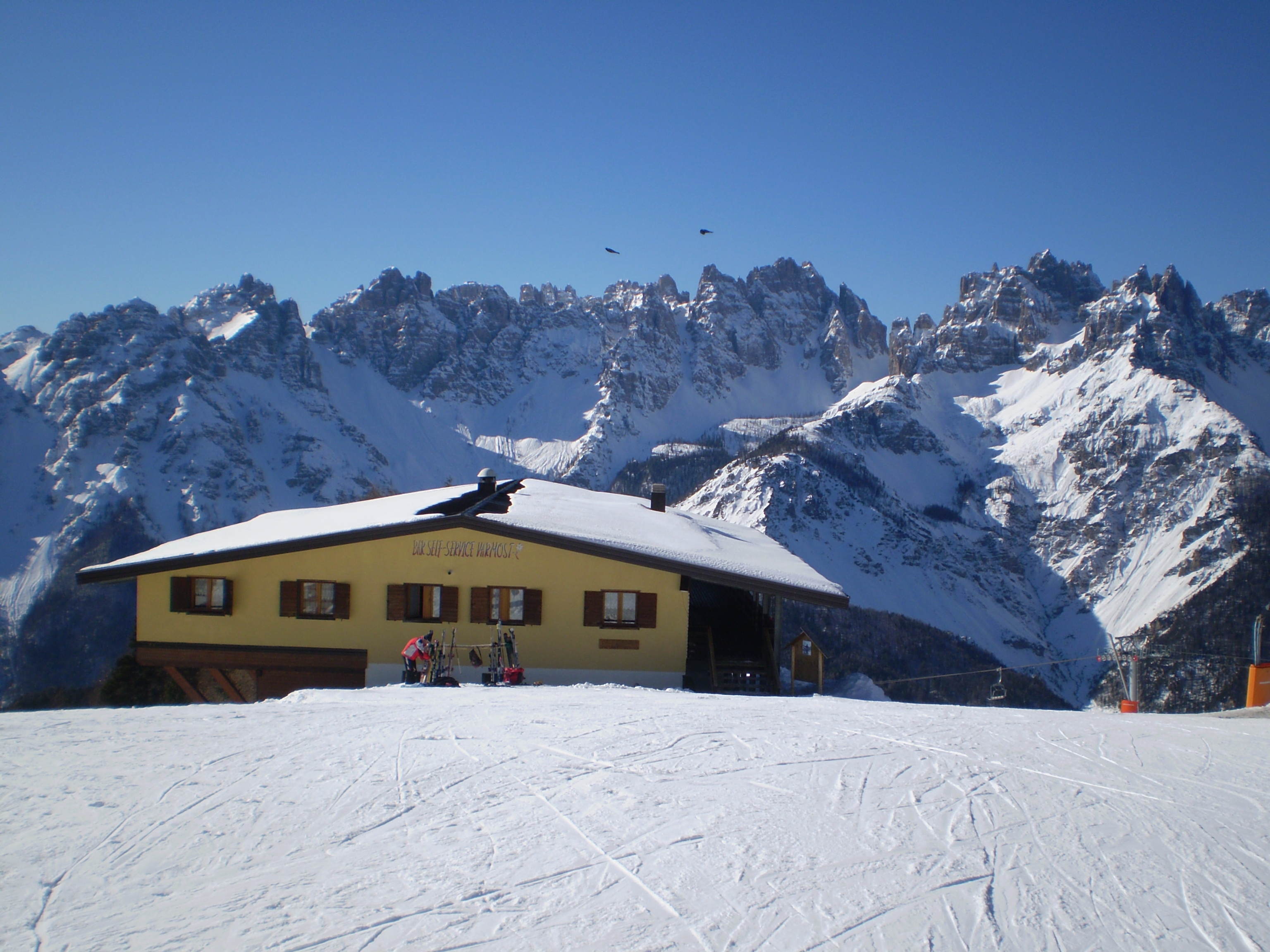
The mountains of Forni di Sopra

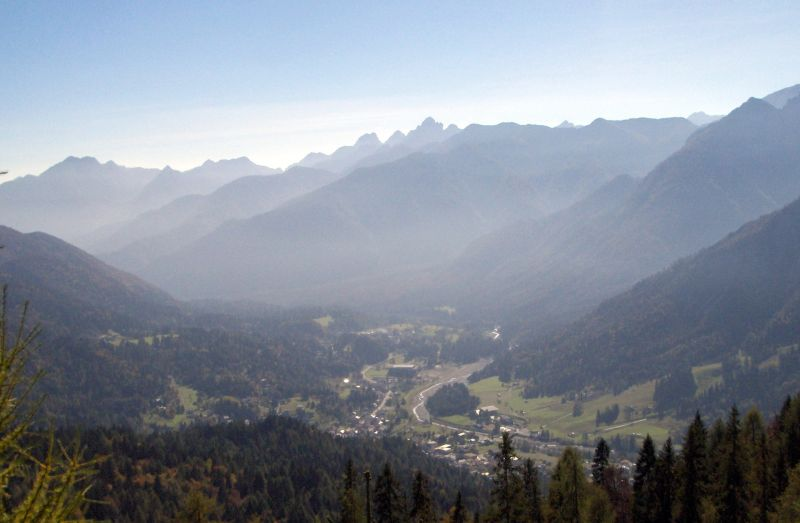
aerial view of Forni di Sopra

Forni di Sopra is the third most visited settlement by tourists in Friuli-Venezia Giulia, and the most visited mountain settlement in the region. The town is most visited by tourists during the summer and in skiing season.

== History ==
The first historical references to the village date from 778 AD, though recent archaeological findings suggest that there was already a settlement here roughly 2,500 years ago. The University of Venice is planning to continue its archaeological studies here over the coming years.

== Main sights ==
The main summer attraction is some 3,000 species of wild flora that thrive in the commune area. In addition, at one end of the village, the Parco Naturale delle Dolomiti Friulane (a nature reserve) begins. This is the largest European nature reserve which is neither populated, nor crossed by any roads (with the exception of one which is 100 metres (330 ft) long and mostly used by rangers).

Winter attractions are largely snow and ski based, as the village's ski slopes begin at 2,100 metres (6,900 ft) above sea level, on Monte Crusicalas, on the Varmòst complex, making this the highest skiing point of the region. There is also a second skiing plane on the southern side of the village, next to its sport complexes (swimming pool, summer tennis courts, and an outdoor ice skating rink).

== Economy ==
Tourism is the major driving force of the local economy, with many tourists buying second homes in the region. This creates demand for building work and service industry. Less central to the economy, but still noteworthy is the spectacle manufacturing industry. Many employed by this commute to the Veneto region (particularly the Cadore area) where many of the world's major spectacle manufacturers are based.
