= 1852 in architecture =

The year 1852 in architecture involved some significant architectural events and new buildings.

== Events ==
- February – Augustus Pugin suffers a breakdown and is admitted to a private asylum, Kensington Housea, London, days after designing the clock tower for the Palace of Westminster.
- June – Augustus Pugin is transferred to the Royal Bethlem Hospital.
- date unknown – Thomas M. Penson restores a house at 22 Eastgate Street, Chester, England, in black-and-white Revival style.

== Buildings and structures ==
=== Buildings completed ===
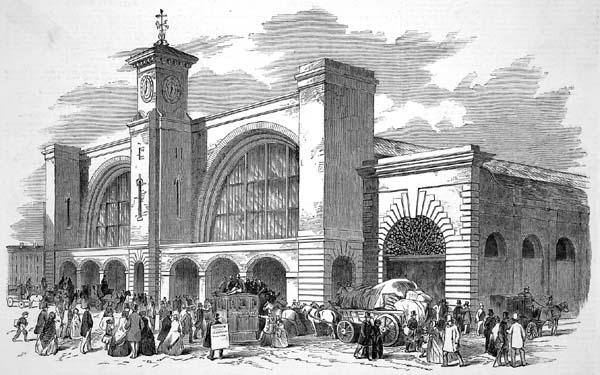
King's Cross railway station.

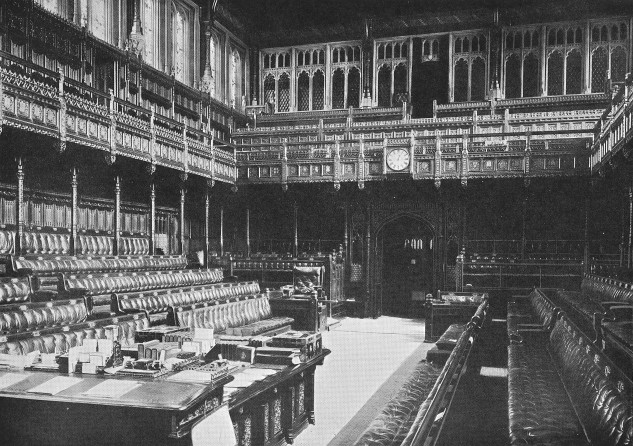
British House of Commons.

- January 1 – Battle railway station, East Sussex (England), designed by William Tress, is opened.
- February 3 – The House of Commons of the United Kingdom in the Palace of Westminster, London (England) designed by Charles Barry and Augustus Pugin, is opened.
- May 15 – Teatro Comunale Alighieri in Ravenna, designed by Tommaso and Giambattista Meduna, is opened.
- October 14 – London King's Cross railway station, designed by Lewis Cubitt, is opened.
- Helsinki Cathedral, Finland, designed by Carl Ludvig Engel, is completed.
- Chapel of St Edmund's College, Ware, England, designed by Augustus Pugin in 1845, is completed.
- Rolle Mausoleum, Bicton, Devon, England, reconstructed by Augustus Pugin, is completed.
- Siegestor (Victory Gate) in Munich, Bavaria, designed by Friedrich von Gärtner, is completed by Eduard Mezger.
- Åmodt bro suspension bridge, Oslo, Norway.
- Philippi Covered Bridge, West Virginia, United States.

== Awards ==
- RIBA Royal Gold Medal – Leo von Klenze.
- Grand Prix de Rome, architecture – P.R.L. Ginain.

== Births ==
- June 25 – Antoni Gaudí, Catalan Modernist architect (died 1926)
- July 4 – E. S. Prior, English Arts and Crafts architect and theorist (died 1932)

== Deaths ==
- May 7 – James Savage, English architect (born 1779; buried in his St Luke's Church, Chelsea)
- May 8 – Giuseppe Jappelli, Italian neoclassical architect and engineer (born 1783)
- July 5 – Matthew Habershon, English architect (born 1789)
- September 14 – Augustus Pugin, English architect, designer, artist and critic (born 1812; "convulsions followed by coma")
