= Gian Antonio Selva =

Italian architect

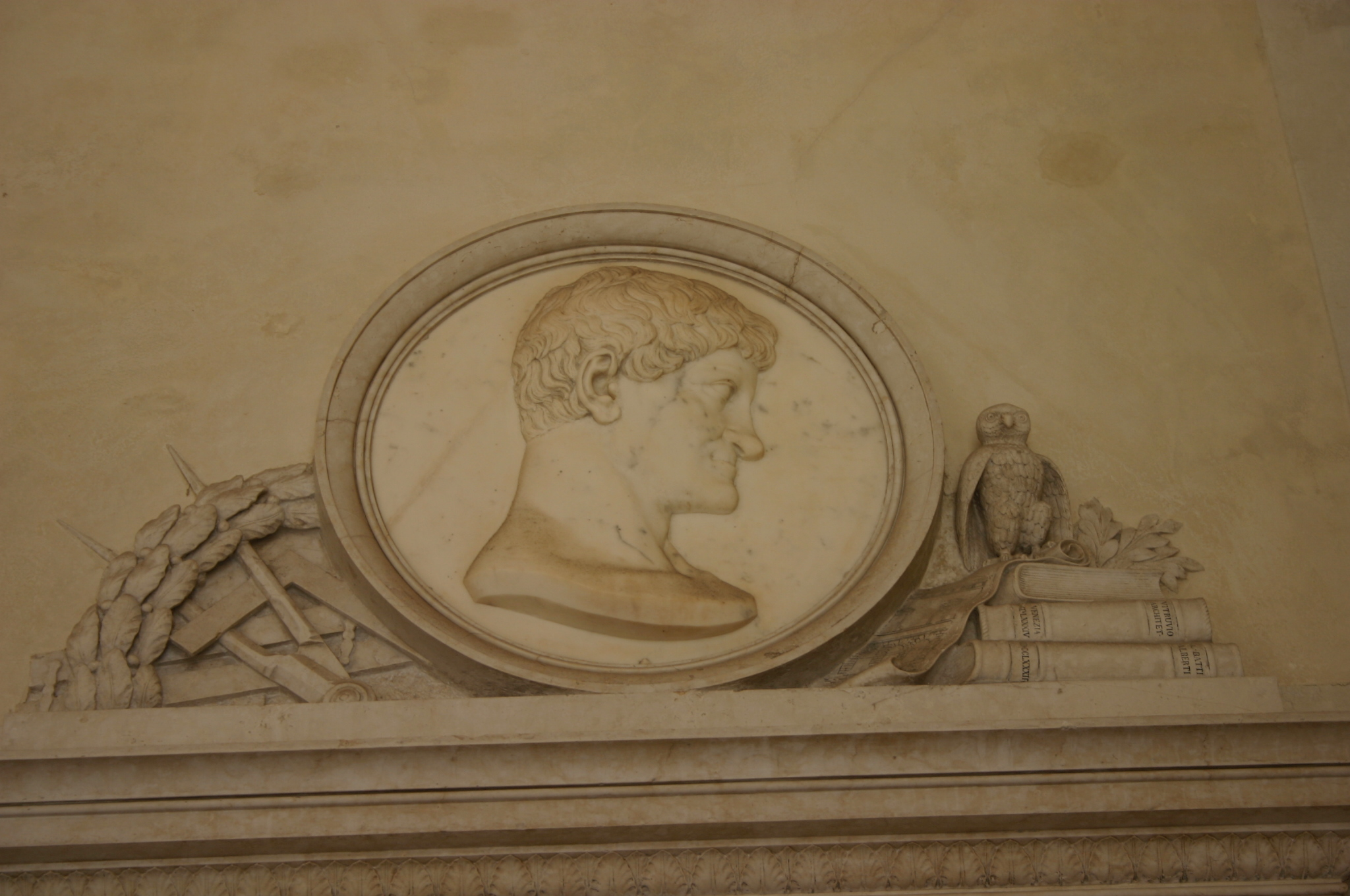
- Portrait of Selva at the Teatro La Fenice in Venice
- Born: 2 September 1751; Venice, Republic of Venice
- Died: 22 January 1819 (aged 67); Venice, Kingdom of Lombardy–Venetia
- Occupation: Architect
- Movement: Neoclassicism
- Buildings: La Fenice; San Maurizio, Venice

Gian Antonio Selva (2 September 1751 - 22 January 1819) was an Italian neoclassical architect.

== Biography ==
=== Early career ===
He was born in Venice, the son of scientist Lorenzo Selva. He studied architecture in Venice, and was a pupil of the architect Tommaso Temanza and the painter Pietro Antonio Novelli. Selva visited Rome, where he met Antonio Canova and traveled with him to Naples. He also visited London, Paris, Belgium and the Netherlands (1778-1781).

After early commissions in Paris and Rome to design settings for banquets in the residences of the respective Venetian ambassadors, in 1782 Selva was made responsible for the interior design at the Teatro San Benedetto, Venice, for the reception held in honour of the Comte and Comtesse du Nord (the future Tsar Paul I and his wife), the subject of a painting by Francesco Guardi. In 1783 he was called on to act as consultant for the garden of the Ambassador Dolfin, which was then being rebuilt at Mincana.

Numerous families from Venice and the mainland then commissioned him either to restructure or create their town houses and villas, and in these designs he excelled in combining comfort with elegance. Among these schemes were the Palazzo Erizzo (1783–4), the Palazzo Dolfin Manin (1794) and the Palazzo Smith Mangilli Valmarana (1794), all in Venice; the Villa Manfrin (c. 1790) at Sant’Artemio, near Treviso; the Palazzo Pisani de Lazzara (1783) and the Palazzo Dotti Vigodarzere (1796) in Padua.

=== La Fenice ===
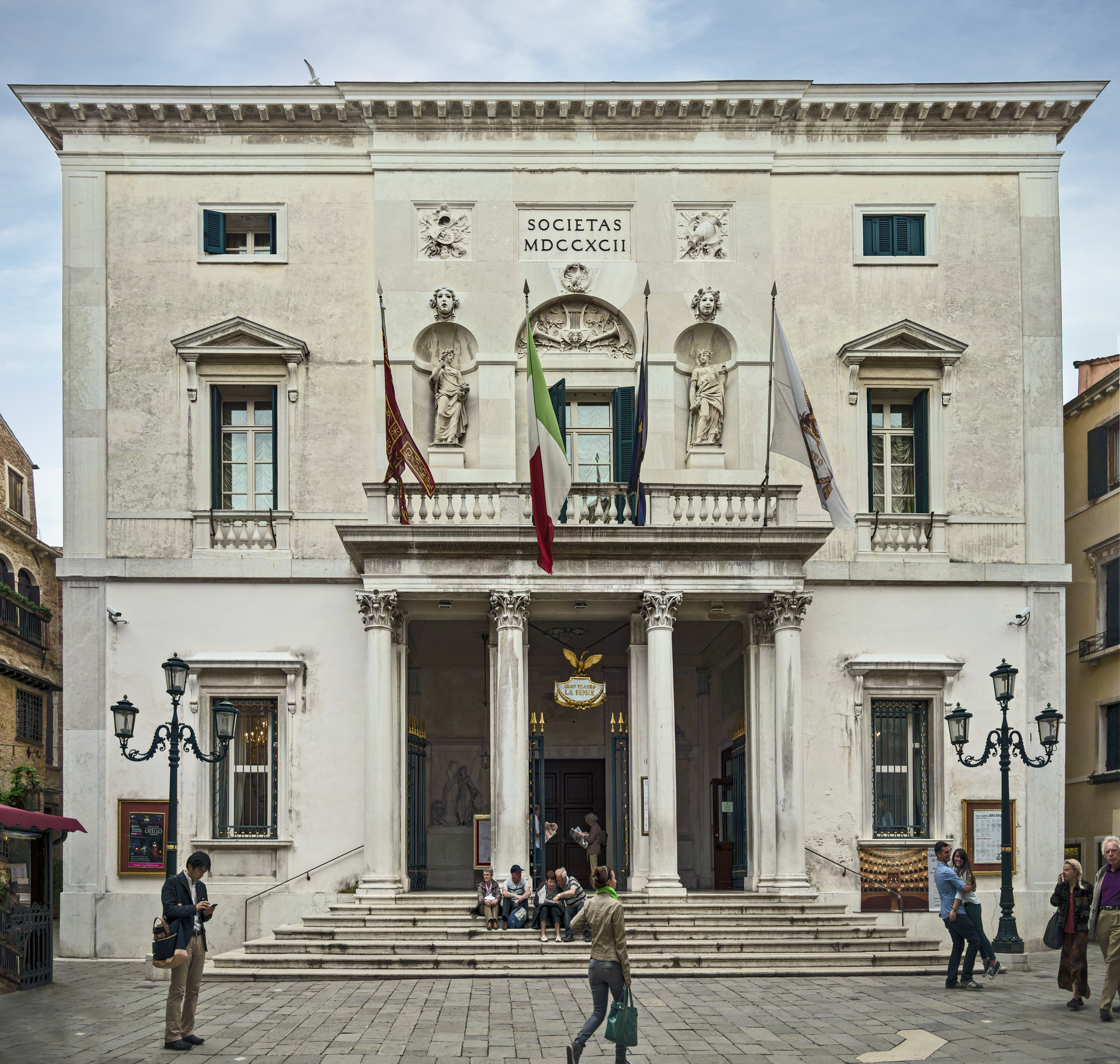
Façade of the Teatro La Fenice

Selva rose to fame principally through his design for the Teatro Venice, Venice. A competition was announced in 1789 by a theatrical management company and attracted 28 designs for a theatre to be built on an irregular site in the centre of the city, facing on one side the Campo San Fantino and on the other a canal to be dug between the Rio dell’Albero and the Rio Menuo, thereby creating access by both land and water.

Selva’s design sought to reconcile the rigorous ideas of Carlo Lodoli, who rejected all non-functional decoration, with the more traditional canons of his own teacher, the neo-Palladian Temanza. The façade towards the canal, which corresponded to the back wall of the stage, comprised a portico made up of five semicircular arches, while at first-floor level three large windows illuminated the stage. In the centre of the other façade, on the Campo San Fantino, were statues and low reliefs, while the theatre’s emblem, a phoenix, filled the lunette in the central window on the first floor. A projecting tetrastyle portico of Corinthian columns raised on a flight of steps completed this façade.

The internal organization of the building was more controversial. For the auditorium itself Selva chose the horseshoe plan previously used at the Teatro Argentina, Rome, and the Teatro alla Scala, Milan, which offered good visibility and acoustics. The internal elevation was divided into four levels in addition to the stalls, each level subdivided into 35 individual boxes (necessitated by the custom of taking dinner and gaming in the boxes). The elegant rooms of the foyer, decorated in a refined Neoclassical style, formed a suite along the axis of the Campo façade. The difficulties encountered by Selva in reconciling the interior with the twin façades, however, led to criticism from one of his rivals in the competition, Pietro Bianchi, who took the management to court for having rejected his proposal. The theatre was virtually destroyed by a fire in 1836 and subsequently rebuilt by Tommaso Meduna and Giovanni Battista Meduna; only the two façades remained of Selva’s original building.

=== Napoleonic period ===
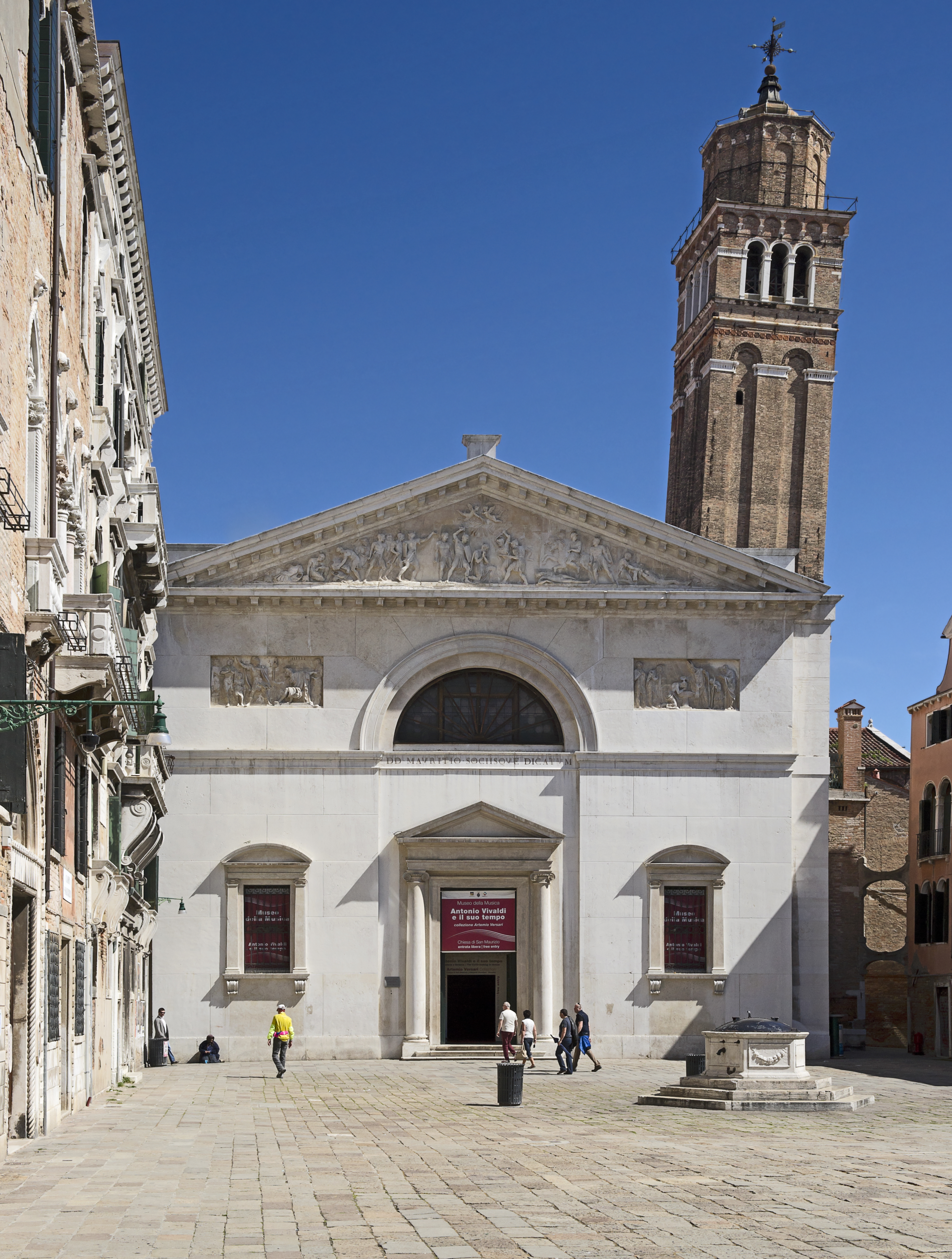
San Maurizio, Venice

In the early 1800s Selva built numerous churches, including the superb Neoclassical San Maurizio (1806; with Antonio Diedo) and the Santissimo Nome di Gesù (completed 1834), both in Venice, and the cathedral in the small town of Cologna Veneta, which he rebuilt (1807–10) in a Neoclassical style. It features an octastyle Corinthian pronaos at the top of a long flight of steps and exhibits a number of similarities with the exactly contemporary portico added by Bernard Poyet to the Chamber of Deputies (Palais Bourbon), Paris. For Napoleon he built a triumphal arch on the Grand Canal, and he also obtained prestigious commissions for the construction of the public gardens at Castello and at the Giudecca and for San Michele Cemetery. For the Castello gardens he chose a regular plan in keeping with their intended use, which was to accommodate large crowds of people, while attempting to achieve a balance of regularly and irregularly arranged areas. He also sought to exploit the picturesque views offered of the lagoon and its scattered islands. One area towards the perimeter was created in the English style, with a hillock, twisting path and small monopteral temple. The gardens were only partially completed to Selva’s design, however, and have since been altered for use as the venue of the Venice Biennale exhibition.

As a lecturer at the Accademia di Belle Arti, Selva was responsible for choosing the academy’s headquarters in the former convent of Charity, and he also supervised the adaptation of this Palladian complex to its modern role as the home of the Gallerie dell'Accademia. He died suddenly in Venice in 1819.

== Bibliography ==
- Balistreri, Emiliano (2018). "SELVA, Giannantonio". Dizionario Biografico degli Italiani (in Italian). Vol. 91: Savoia–Semeria. Rome: Istituto dell'Enciclopedia Italiana. ISBN 978-88-12-00032-6.
