= San Pietro, Schio =

Church building in Schio, Italy

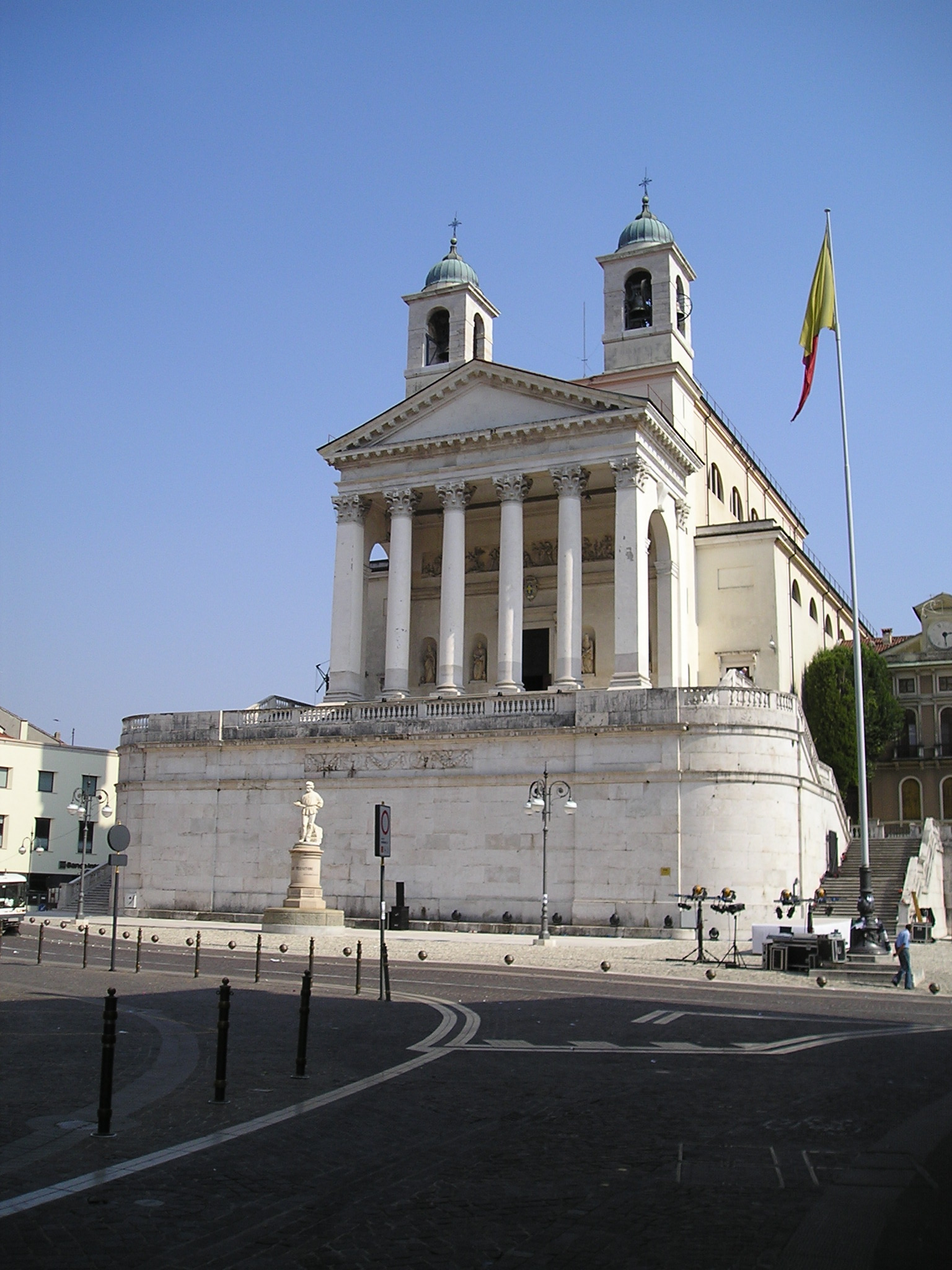
Duomo of Schio

San Pietro, or St Peter, is the Neoclassical-style, main Roman Catholic church or duomo of the town of Schio, region of Veneto, Italy.

== History and description ==
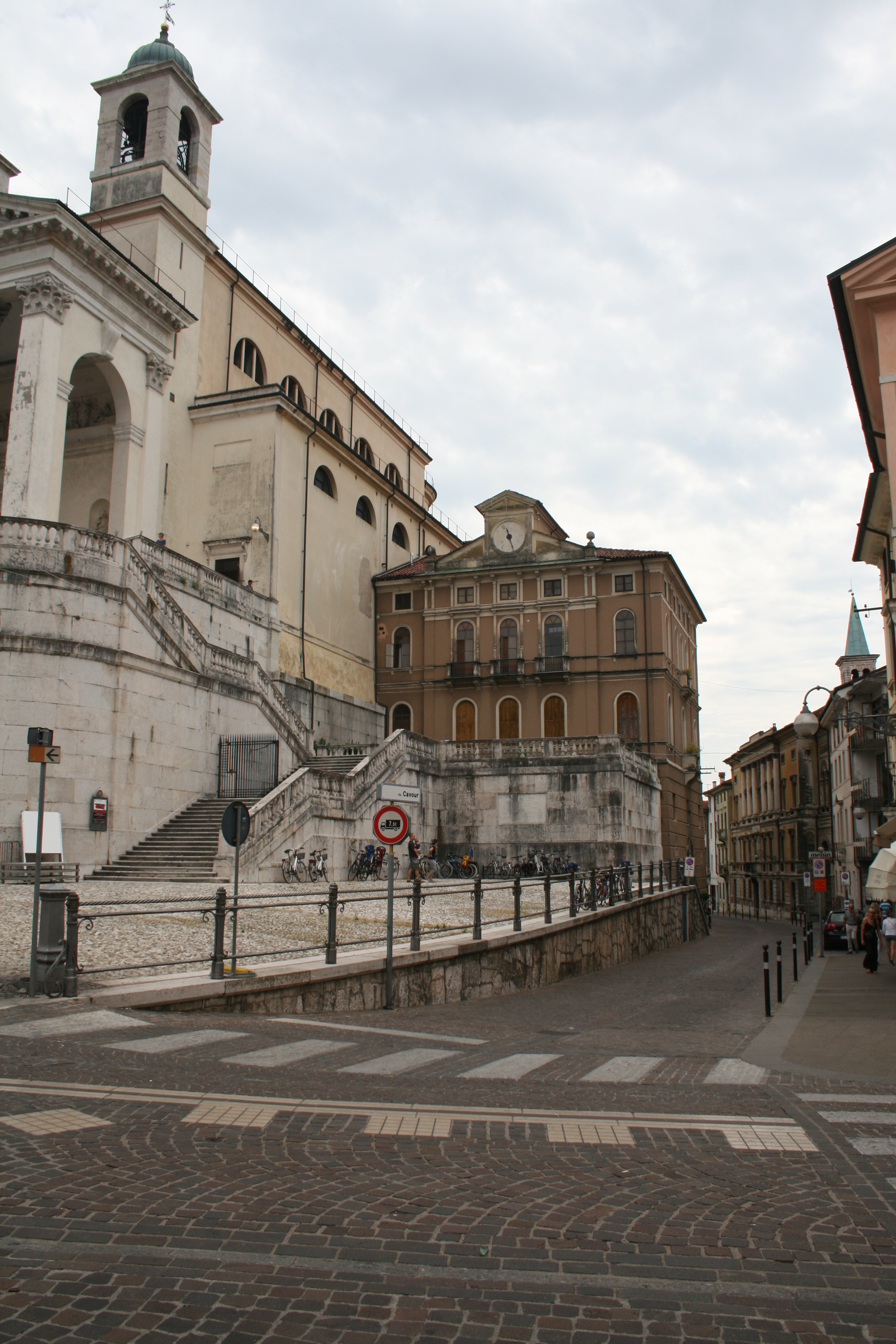
Adjacent Canonica and stairs of Duomo

A chapel at the site was present since medieval times, becoming a church by the 12th century dependent on the church of Pievebelvicino (Torrebelvicino), which was the mother church of the Val Leogra. With the rising importance of Schio, this became the home of the archpriest for the region and principal church. The nave was built between 1740 and 1754 by Giovanni Battista Miazzi, with refurbishment of the choir in 1780 by Domenico Cerato. A new church facade was erected between 1805 and 1820, using designs of Antonio Diedo, carried out by Carlo Barrera. The scenographic staircases leading to the raised balcony-platform in front of the facade were erected in 1837 by Tommaso Meduna. The facade has a sober pronaos and flanked by symmetric bell-towers, inspired by the Palladian designs of a chapel (Tempietto Barbaro) at Villa Barbaro in Maser. The adjacent canon's house or manse, with a clock on the facade, and the lateral aisles of the church were added between 1877 and 1879 by Alessandro Rossi.

Inside the altars date to the 18th century. The interior decoration is by various artists, including Valentino Zajec (bas-reliefs in nave, and statues of the evangelists and apostles); Giovanni Busato (monochrome frescoes in apse and the altarpiece depicting Saints Carlo and Luigi; Valentino Pupin (ceiling fresco and the altarpiece depicting St Joseph; Romano and Guido Cremasco; Tito Chini (apse and window spandrel decorations), and Alfredo Ortelli (Jesus the teacher). The sacristy has canvases by Alessandro Maganza and Tomaso Pasquotti. The church has two organs, one by Mascioni del 1942 and an 18th-century organ from Puglia.
