= San Silvestro, Venice =

Church building in Venice, Italy

Coordinates: 45°26′15″N 12°20′0.29″E

Church of San Silvestro
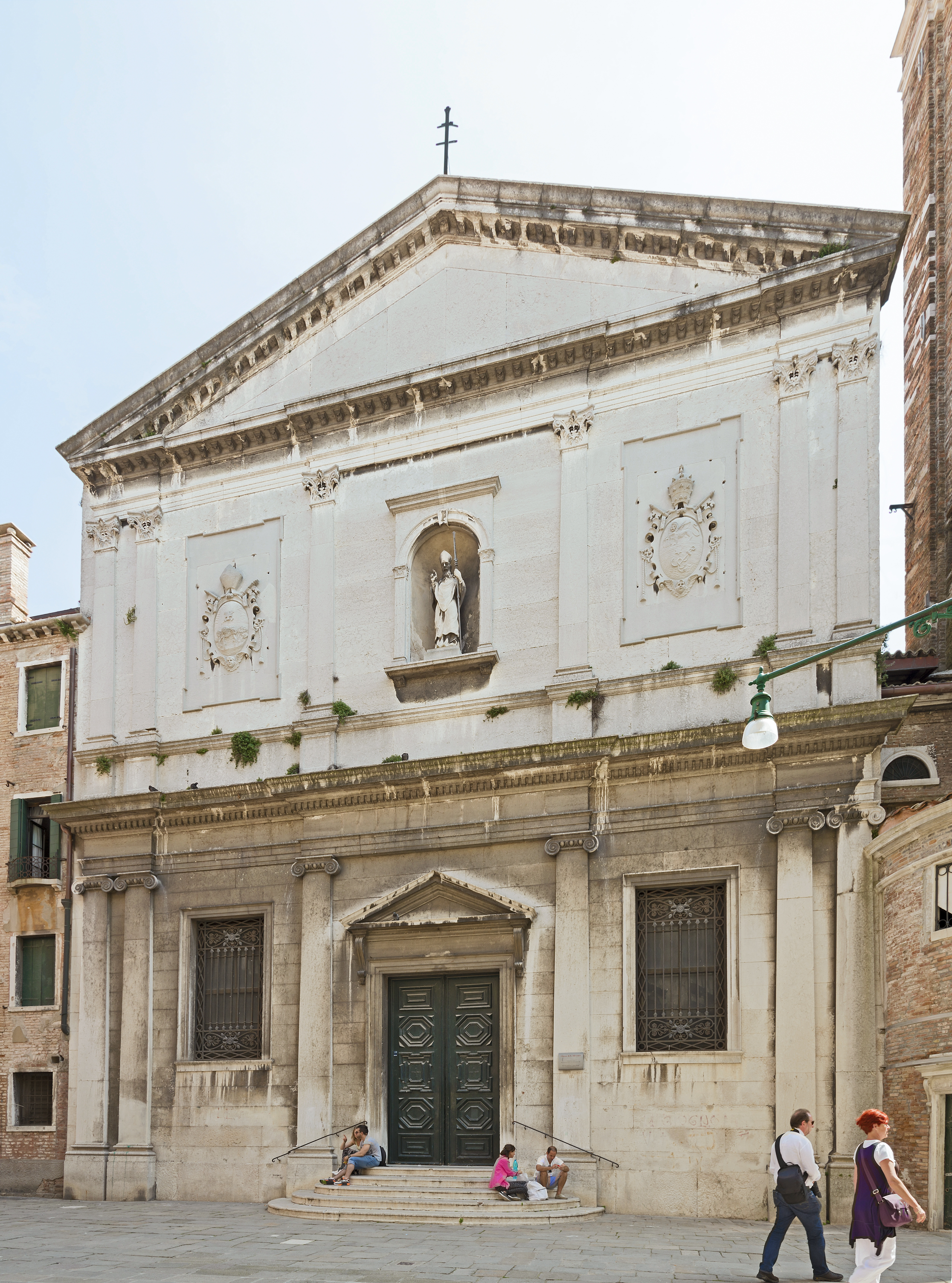

- Location within Venice Location within Italy

Religion
- Affiliation: Roman Catholic
- Province: Veneto

Location
- Location: Venice, Italy

Architecture
- Architects: Giovanni Battista Meduna and Giuseppe Sicher (facade)
- Type: Church
- Completed: 1909 (facade)

San Silvestro is a church building in the sestiere of San Polo of Venice, northern Italy.

== History ==
The church is located in the business district of Rialto. Originally, in the 12th century, it was under the jurisdiction of the Patriarch of Grado. After rebuilding, it was reconsecrated in 1422, and in 1485 it merged with the Oratory of Santa Maria dei Patriarchi e di Ognissanti. After a partial collapse in 1820, the church was entirely rebuilt from 1837, being reconsecrated in 1850, to designs by Giovanni Meduna. The facade is modern, and was completed in 1909 by Giuseppe Sicher. The Baroque ceiling has paintings by Ludovico Dorigny. The altars were designed in the 19th century by Santi and decorated by the sculptor Giovanni Antonio Dorigo.

The interior has four Renaissance panels, among them a Baptism of Christ by Tintoretto.

The Adoration of the Magi by Paolo Veronese is a large oil painting on canvas painted for the church in 1573 which has been in the National Gallery, London since the church sold it in 1855, presumably to finance the rebuilding. The painting was commissioned by the confraternity of Saint Joseph (Scuola di San Giuseppe). They were not one of the very wealthy Scuole Grandi of Venice, nor trade-based like others with altars in the church, but essentially devotional, and they included female members.

The church had a number of significant paintings, and the Veronese was next to the altar of St Joseph on the left side wall, which in the next century was given an altarpiece by Johann Carl Loth of the unusual subject of Joseph presenting the newborn Jesus to God the Father, which remains in the church. The Veronese had some fame, being singled out for mention in early guide books such as Giovanni Stringa's 1604 revision of Francesco Sansovino's Venetia. In 1670 agents of the new Cosimo III de' Medici, Grand Duke of Tuscany, who had failed to persuade the convent of Saint Catherine to sell Veronese's Mystical Marriage of St Catherine of 1575 (now Gallerie dell'Accademia), turned to San Silvestro and attempted to bribe every member of the confraternity to sell the work, but failed after two years.

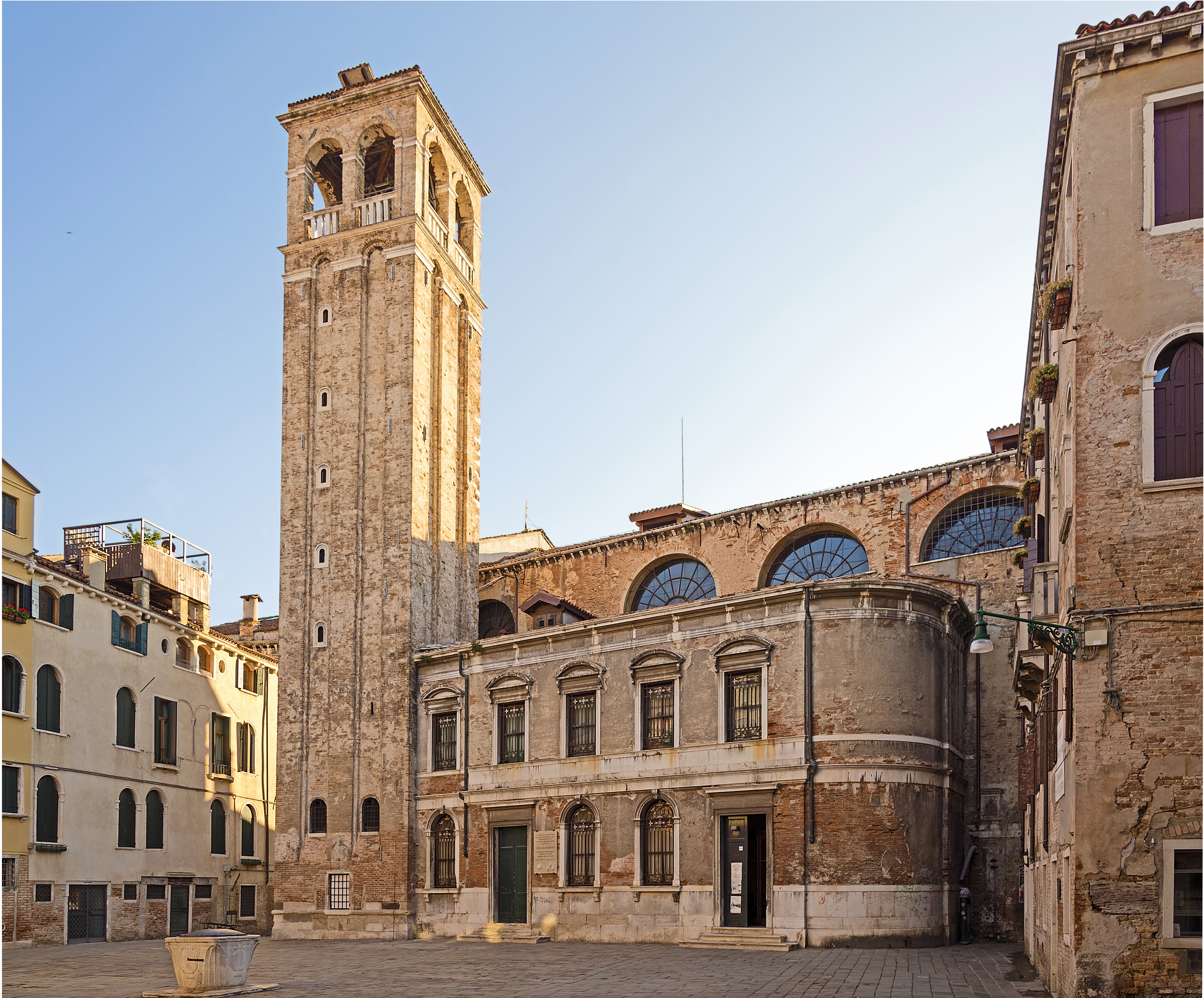
Campanile and church (West exposure).
