= Teatro Comunale Alighieri =

Opera house

Coordinates: 44°25′02″N 12°12′04″E

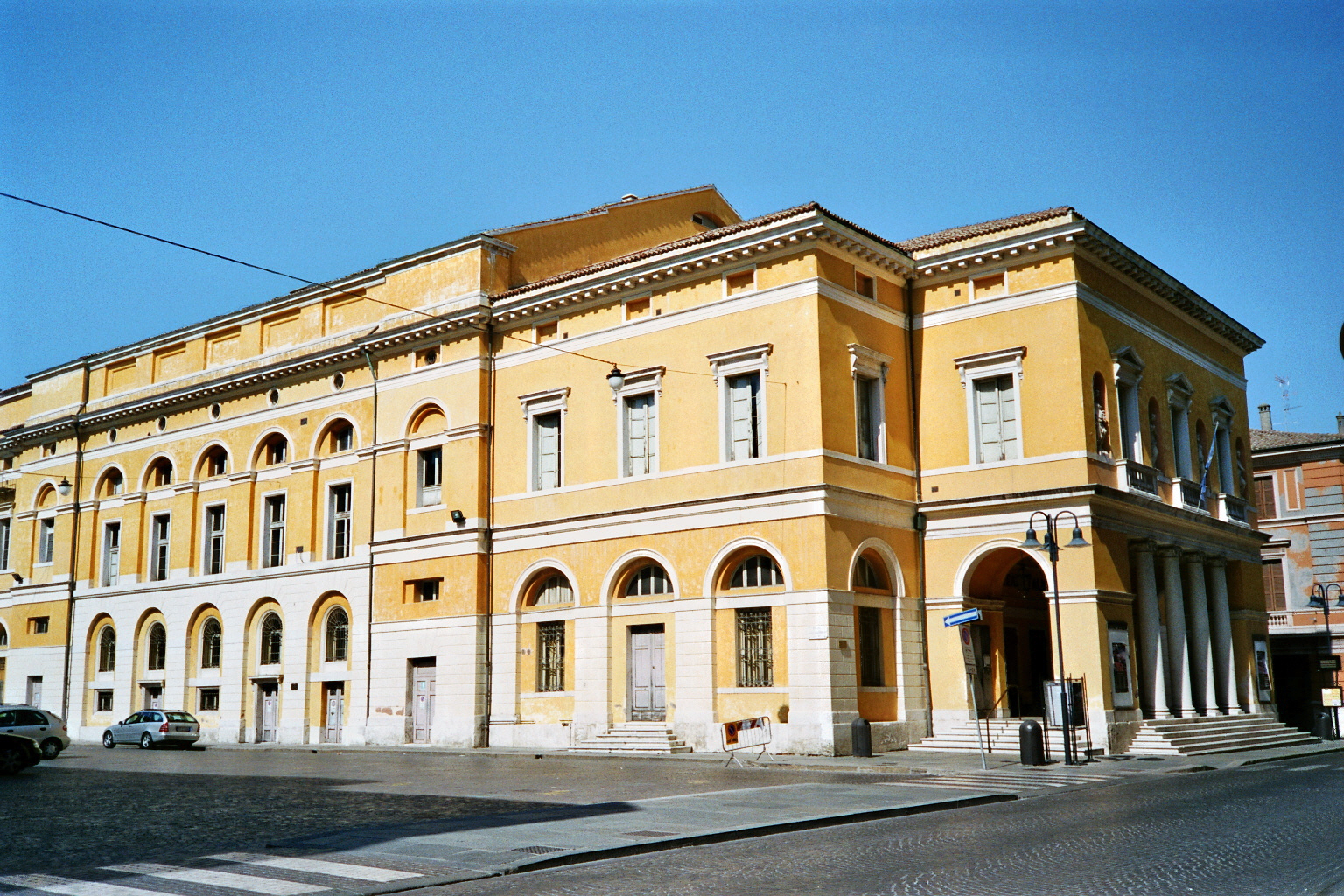
The theatre building

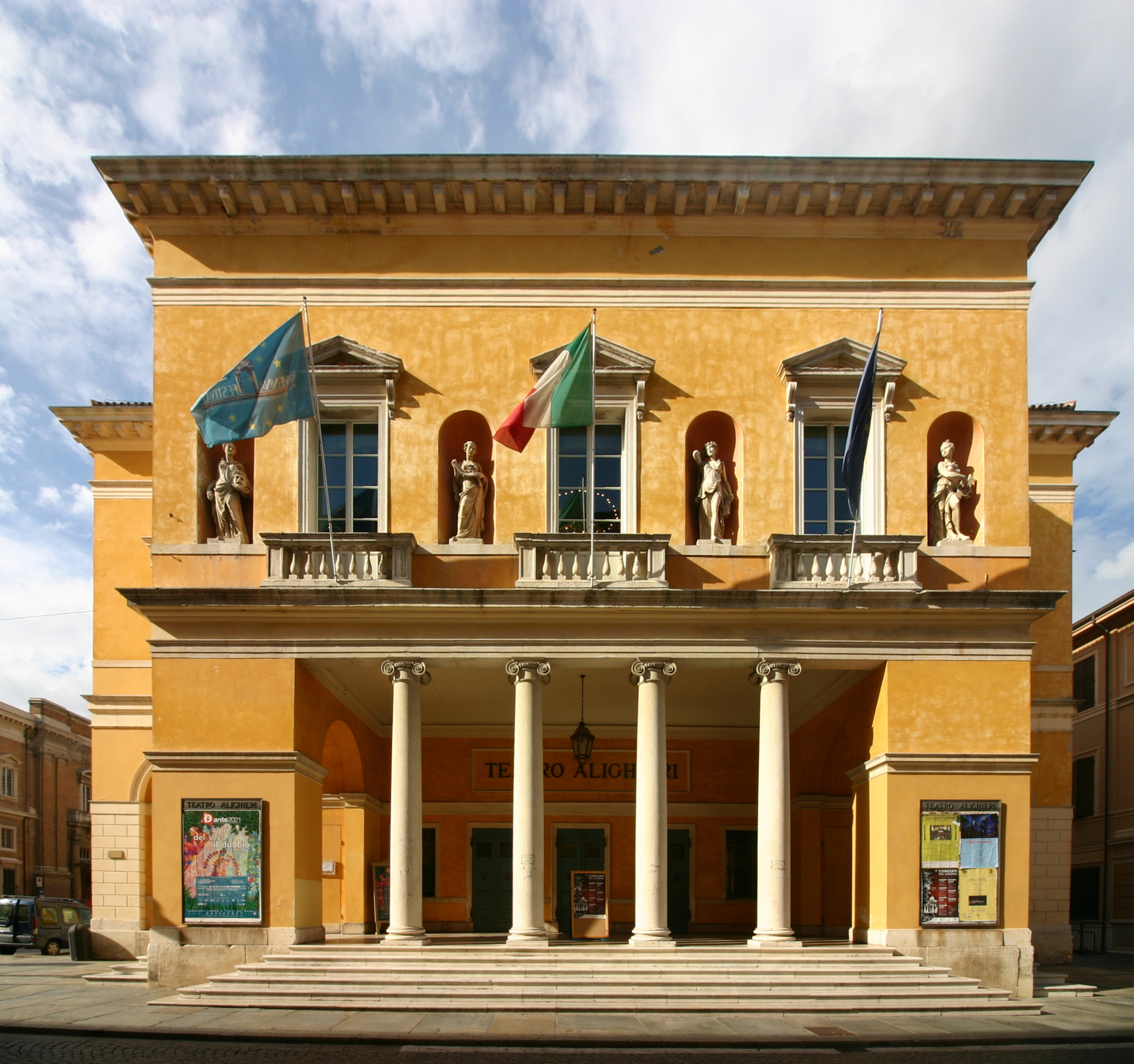
Entrance and main facade

The Teatro Comunale Alighieri is an opera house located at 2 Via Mariani in Ravenna, Italy and designed by the Venetian architects, Tommaso Meduna and his brother, Giambattista who had designed the second La Fenice theatre after the fire of 1836 . The new Teatro Comunale Alighieri was inaugurated on 15 May 1852 with a production of Meyerbeer's Robert le diable, followed by Giovanni Pacini's Medea.

It presently offers a program of up to six operas during the season which runs from November to April.

For about 125 years following 1723, Ravenna had one main theatre for the presentation of opera, the Teatro Comunitativo located outside the centre of the city. It featured a lavishly decorated, U-shaped baroque auditorium with 97 boxes on four tiers. In the 50 years following 1802, it presented 170 operatic productions, 24 of which were by Rossini, 22 by Donizetti, and 10 by Verdi. However, the 1830s and 1840s revealed its inadequacy, and plans were made to build a new theatre in the heart of the city; the cornerstone of the replacement theatre was laid in 1840.

With construction continuing until 1852, the new Teatro Comunale was named for the famous poet, Dante Aligheri, who had been exiled from Florence and spent his last four years of life in Ravenna. Reflecting the style of the Venetian brothers, the exterior of the Alighieri is neo-classical with a four ionic columns and a portico with statues of four Muses. With 118 boxes in four tiers plus a gallery, the auditorium was constructed in the traditional horseshoe shape with 830 seats.

As befitting his position as the major operatic composer of the day, Giuseppe Verdi's operas were dominant at the new theatre during its first fifty years; of other composers' works, Donizetti's operas were the only ones which appeared regularly until 1870 and those of Bellini vanished after 1866. However, French grand opera survived until the 20th century.

Since its foundation in 1990, the annual June/July Ravenna Festival has presented a very diverse range of operas at the Alighieri. These have included rare works by Salieri, Auber, and Cherubini as well as less performed operas by many of the standard 19th-century composers plus more popular works.

== See also ==
- List of opera houses
- List of opera festivals
