= Adoration of the Magi (Veronese) =

Painting by Paolo Veronese

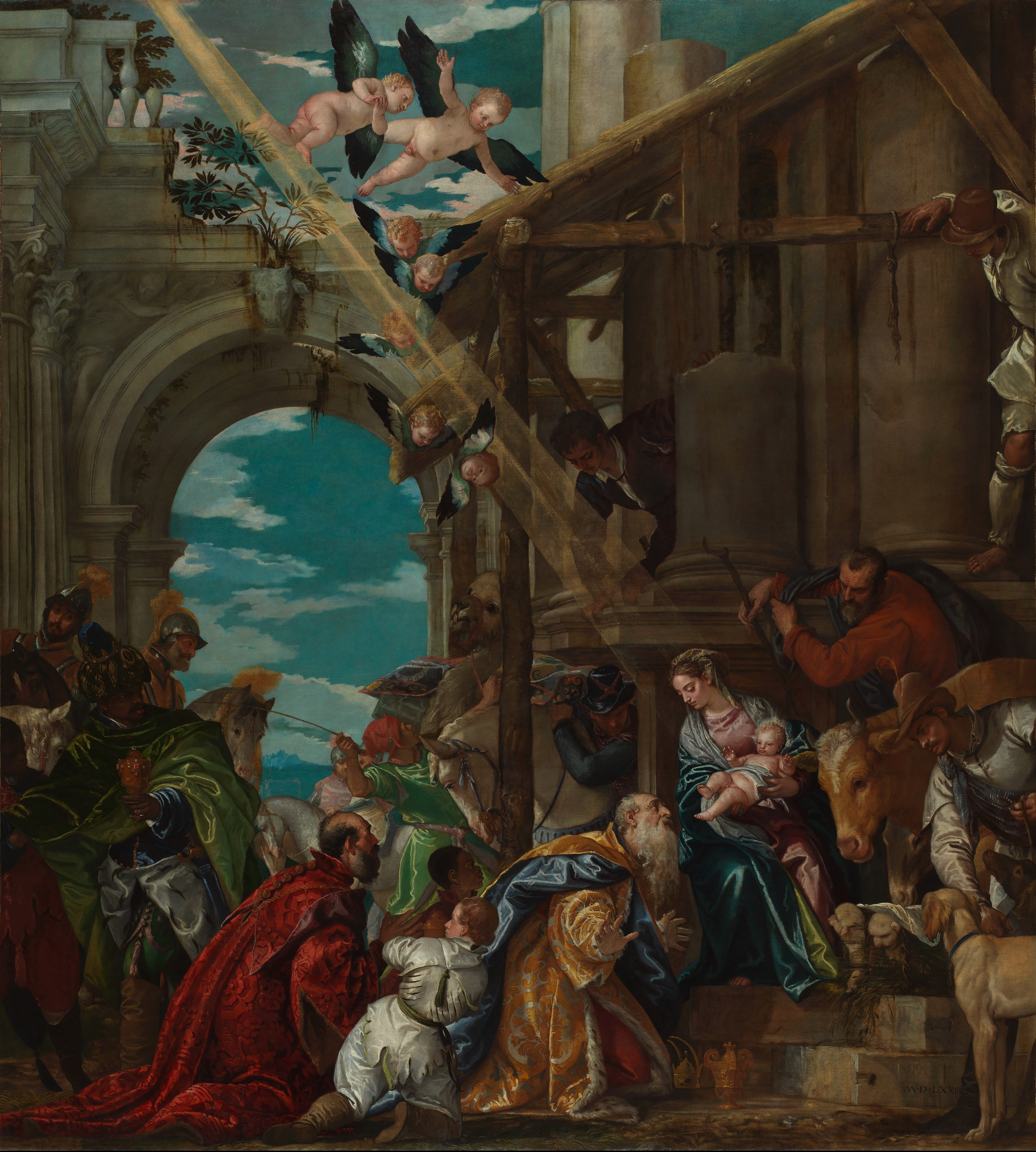
Adoration of the Magi (1573), by Paolo Veronese, zoomable image

The Adoration of the Magi by the Venetian artist Paolo Veronese is a large oil painting on canvas dated to 1573 which has been in the National Gallery, London since 1855, shortly after it was sold by the Venetian church for which it was commissioned. It shows the common subject in the Nativity art of the visit by the Three Kings to the infant Jesus, here given a grandly theatrical treatment typical of Veronese's mature works. It was not an altarpiece, having been painted to hang beside rather than over a side altar in the nave of the church.

== Description ==
The Adoration of the Magi was a very common subject in religious art. It was no doubt chosen for this painting because it was commissioned by a confraternity of Saint Joseph, although he is not especially prominent in the composition, placed hanging off a ledge above the ox. However he is at the top of the compositional diagonal formed by the main figures. Veronese enjoyed painting elaborate and stagey costumes and the three kings, like religious or historical figures in many of his paintings, are very elaborately dressed in robes that reflect the dress of the contemporary Venetian elite but are more extravagant and fanciful than would often actually be worn. It has been suggested that Veronese's costumes drew from theatre costumes, for which he also made drawings, and they might be likened to modern-day haute couture styles, many of which are not really intended to be worn off the catwalk.

The grand architectural setting in a ruined classical temple is also typical of Veronese, who took a serious interest in architecture, although David Rosand suggests that the settings in his large paintings are better considered as stage scenery or temporary monumental decor for royal entries or other occasions (which was often very elaborate at this period) than compared in detail to actual architecture. Nativity scenes are very often given such settings, which apart from showing off the artist's skill acted as a reminder of the medieval legend, reported in the popular compilation of the Golden Legend, that on the night of Christ's birth the Basilica of Maxentius in Rome, supposed to house a statue of Romulus, had partly tumbled to the ground, leaving the impressive ruins that survive today.

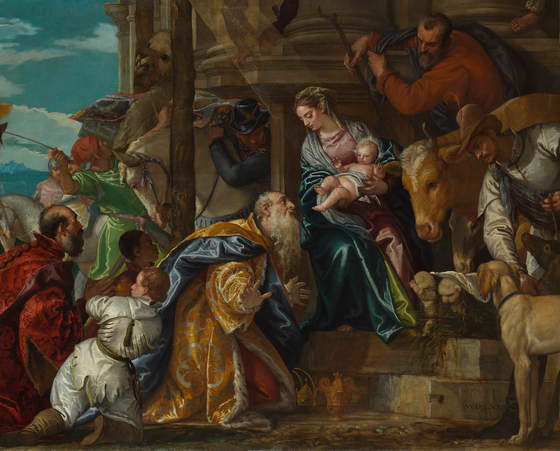
Detail of the main group. The eight human figures here are matched by eight animals, of six species

Another meaning for the ruined temple went back to 15th-century Early Netherlandish painting, when the usual simple shed of the Nativity stable, little changed from Late Antiquity, had developed into an elaborate ruined temple, initially Romanesque in style, which represented the dilapidated state of the Old Covenant of the Jewish law. In Italian works the architecture of such temples became classical, reflecting the growing interest in the ancient world, and the ruins that remained in many areas.

== Dating and attribution ==
There seems no reason to doubt the date of 1573 painted on the lowest stone step. The degree of Veronese's personal involvement has been the subject of varying views since the work came to London, with some doubting that he touched the final work at all, while others believing that the figures are largely by the master's hand. It is generally accepted that Veronese was responsible for detailed preparatory drawings, reflected in the underdrawing that is visible in many places, and was followed with little change. Cecil Gould was the first to point out that in 1573 Veronese also completed works including the enormous The Feast in the House of Levi and a large Madonna del Rosario (both now in the Accademia, Venice), suggesting "that this fact alone would support the idea that there was a large degree of studio participation." Nicholas Penny finds much of the painting "characteristic of the more competent productions of Veronese's workshop, yet the heads of the two older kings are among the finest Veronese ever painted".

The style in some areas, such as the faces of the Virgin and Caspar, and aspects like the inclusion of the ox and ass, "by no means obligatory in a painting" of this subject and "another notably Bassanesque feature", have suggested to several scholars that Jacopo Bassano, or someone from his workshop, collaborated on the painting. Apart from these the painting includes horses, two lambs, two dogs and a camel. Veronese is known to have admired Bassano, who specialized in history paintings in which animals were included.

== History ==
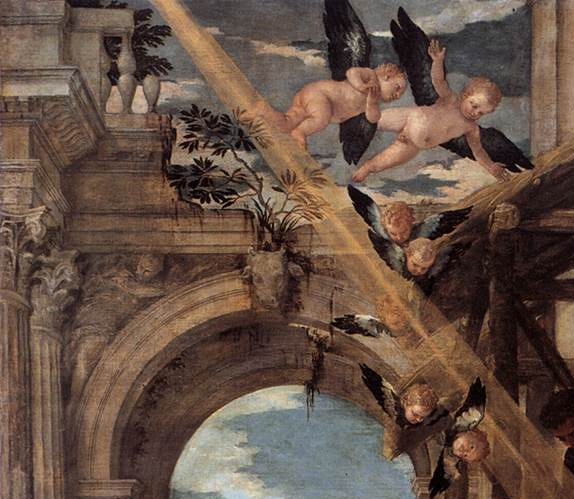
Detail, top left

The provenance of the painting is unusually simple for a 16th-century work, since it was bought by a dealer from the parish church of San Silvestro, Venice, for which it was commissioned. The painting was commissioned by the confraternity of Saint Joseph, the Scuola di San Giuseppe, and placed beside their altar on the left hand wall of the nave. They were not one of the very wealthy Scuole Grandi of Venice, nor trade-based like others with altars in the church, but essentially devotional, and they included female members.

The church had a number of significant paintings, and the Veronese was next to the altar of St Joseph, which in the next century was given an altarpiece by Johann Carl Loth of the unusual subject of Joseph presenting the newborn Jesus to God the Father, which remains in the church. The Veronese had some fame, being singled out for mention in early guide books such as Giovanni Stringa's 1604 revision of Francesco Sansovino's Venetia. In 1670 agents of the new Cosimo III de' Medici, Grand Duke of Tuscany, who had failed to persuade the convent of Saint Catherine to sell Veronese's Mystical Marriage of St Catherine of 1575 (now Gallerie dell'Accademia), turned to San Silvestro and attempted to bribe every member of the confraternity to sell the work, but failed after two years.

After a partial collapse of the structure in 1820 it was decided to largely rebuild the church, and the present internal appearance is entirely 19th-century, with careful observation revealing how the money for the work ran out, with painting replacing reliefs and marble in secondary areas. Work began in 1836, with the Veronese stored in the church from 1837, either folded or rolled up, and the church was reconsecrated in 1850. The exterior facade was finished in 1909, though the campanile or bell tower is 14th-century. The new nave had many fewer altars, with a "lucid articulation of the nave walls" that left no space for a painting the size of the Veronese. According to Penny the "official story" that this was only realized after rebuilding, making the original intention to replace the original large paintings impossible, is improbable, and gaining funds from the sale of the Veronese had probably been part of the plan all along.

The painting was bought from the church by Angelo Toffoli, a Venetian art dealer, on 1 September 1855; the sale had been delayed by the need to obtain both a Papal decree allowing a sale and a permission to export it from the Austrian authorities then ruling Venice. Toffoli sent it to Paris the next month, apparently intending to sell it there to Baron James Mayer de Rothschild of the French Rothschilds or another collector. But the newly appointed Director of the National Gallery, Sir Charles Lock Eastlake, heard of this and bought it from Toffoli, probably without having ever seen it. Toffoli was paid £1,977 on 24 November, and the painting was in London by 29 November. It evidently arrived without its original frame, and the current one was made in Wardour Street before the painting was hung in the gallery on 1 February 1856, since when it has normally been on display, today in Room 9.

== Condition and technique ==
The painting is generally in a good condition, although the nearly twenty years spent rolled or folded up in its final period in Venice and the moves ending at the National Gallery caused localized paint loss along the edges, which were repainted for Toffoli the dealer. When it arrived in the National Gallery "superfluous repaint" was removed in 1856. It was described as worn and hard to see by one 18th-century visitor to San Silvestro, perhaps because of dirt or discoloured varnish. It received further cleaning in 1891, 1934 and 1957. In 2012-13 it was given a "full cleaning and restoration, as well as relining", the examination suggesting that Veronese's own hand was more evident in various of the main figures than had previously been thought.

The painting is on three pieces, each 119 cm wide, of "tabby-weave, medium weight canvas" running across the picture. Rather unusually, the ground is calcium carbonate with glue as a binding medium, rather than the usual gesso based on calcium sulphate; it is not primed. Many pigments used have been identified, and there has been some discolouration.
