= Giovanni Busato =

Italian painter

Giovanni Busato (1806–1886) was an Italian painter, active both in oil and frescoes.

== Biography ==
He was born in Vicenza and initially trained at the Academy of Fine Arts of Venice under Teodoro Matteini. He was later elected instructor of design for the Academy. He travelled widely both within Italy and France, Belgium, England, Russia, and Germany. He submitted an entry for the theater curtain (sipario) for the Fenice theater of Venice, but completed such works for theaters in Trieste, Sinigallia, Corfu, and Ravenna. He also restored a sipario found in St Petersburg which had been painted by Cosroe Dusi. He painted four large canvases for the Cathedral of Schio.
