= Baptism of Christ (Tintoretto, Venice) =

Painting by Tintoretto

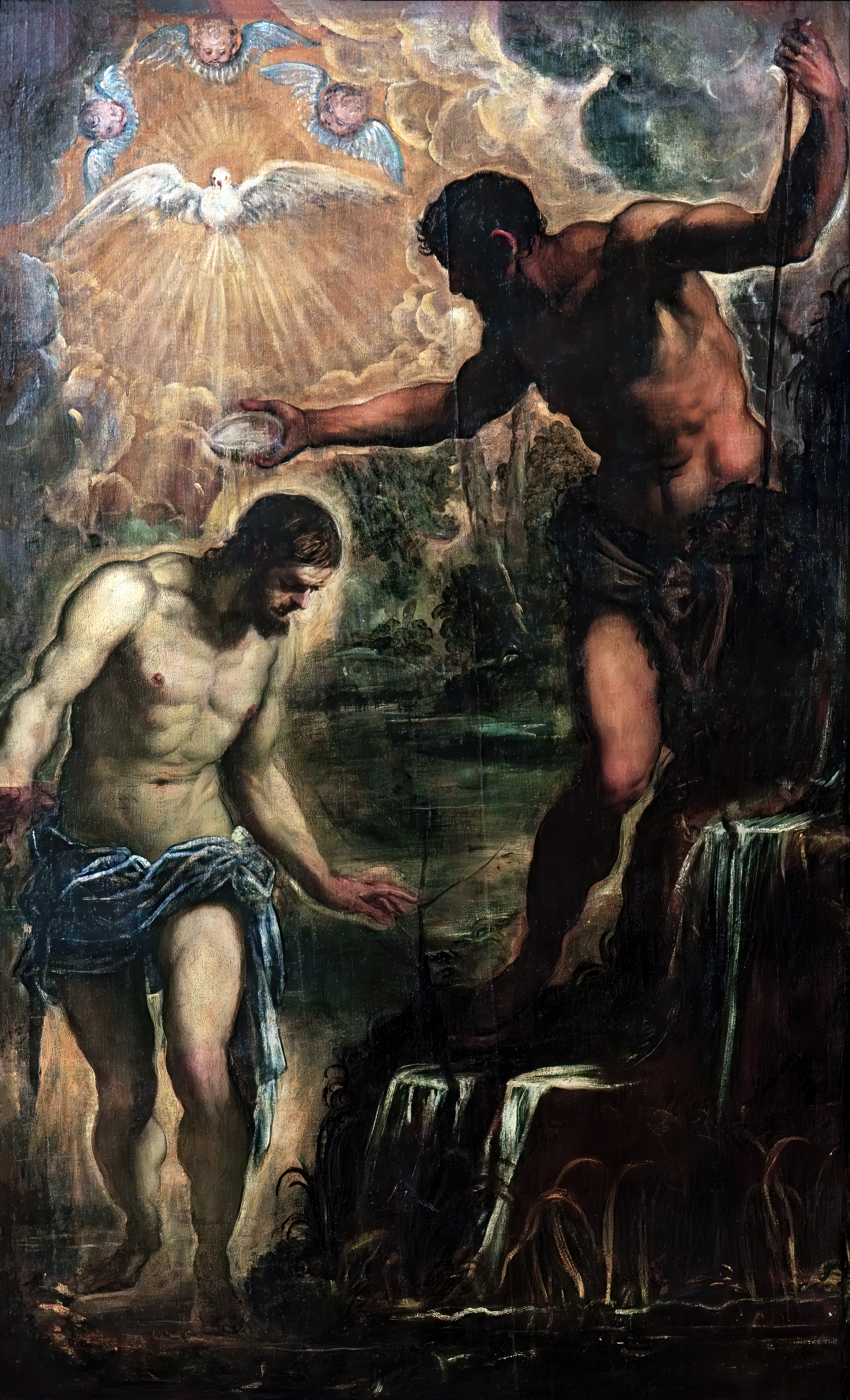
Baptism of Christ (c. 1580) by Tintoretto

Baptism of Christ is a c. 1580 oil on canvas painting by Tintoretto, one of several treatments of the same subject by that artist. One of his most notable works, it hangs as an altarpiece in the church of San Silvestro, Venice. The background landscape is dominated by water, which has major symbolic significance in such a scene.
