= Antonio Diedo =

Italian architect (1772–1847)

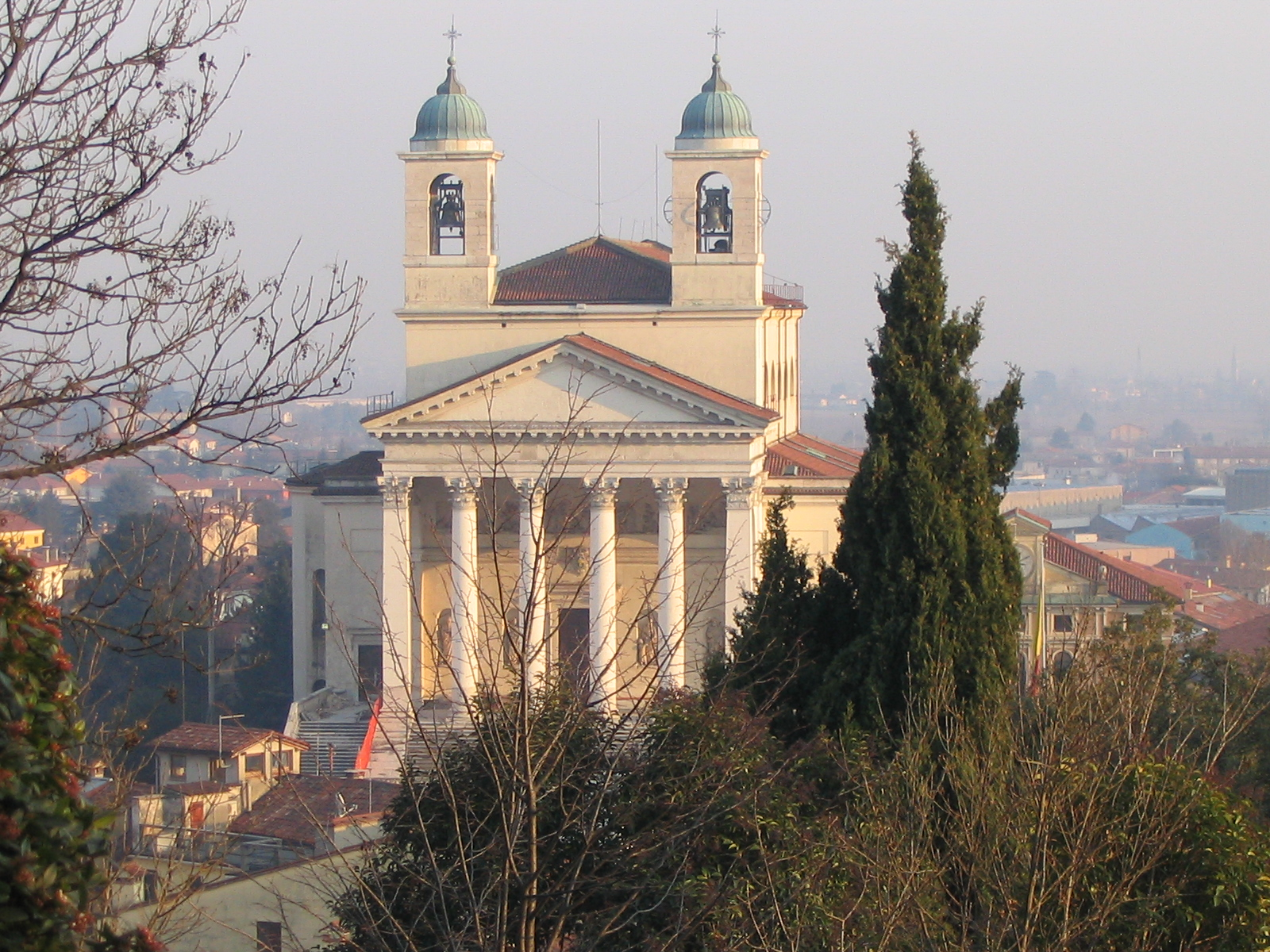
Duomo di Schio

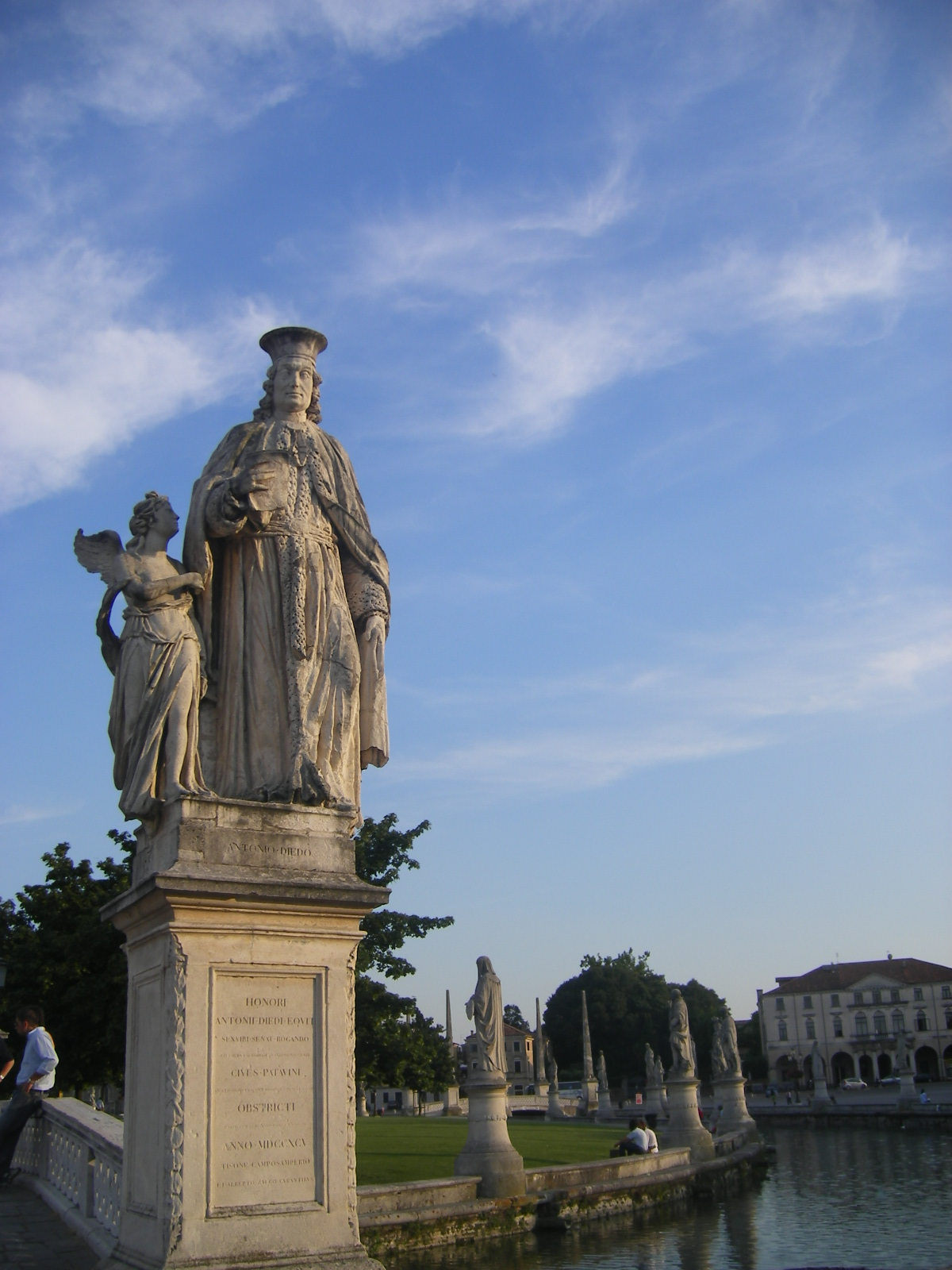
Statue of Antonio Diedo at Prato della Valle in Padua

Antonio Diedo (15 November 1772 – 1 January 1847) was an Italian architect. Born in Venice, he was active both in his natal city and the mainland towns of the Republic of Venice.

== Biography ==
Born to parents from the Venetian patrician families of Diedo and Priuli, as a young man he entered the seminary in Padua. He soon developed an interest in architecture and was educated in that art by Giacomo or Jacopo Albertolli (nephew of Giocondo Albertolli), a noted architect. Antonio wrote a number of treatises on architecture, including a monograph on Giovanni Battista Novello; a Speech on Architecture read in 1805 at the Accademia Veneta dei Filareti; also a Dissertation about the imitation of the antique in architecture given to the same academy; and article in the Giornale di Padova about the work of Jacopo Querenghi, titled Sul bello di proporzione in architettura. He became secretary and professor of the Academy of Fine Arts of Venice. In 1838, he was knighted to the Order of the Iron Crown by the Austrian emperor Ferdinand I.

Among his designs were:

- Rear facade of Palazzo Giustinian-Recanati sulle Zattere, Venice
- Windows and door of the facade of San Maurizio, Venice
- Oratory in Casa Grimani-Wetzlar on the Brenta Canal
- Principal stairwell of Casa Contarini in the frazione of Ponte di Brenta, Padua
- Ground floor of Palazzo Giovanelli in Ponte di Brenta
- Facade of Casa Gregoletto at Via Altinate #124
- Parish church and bell-tower at Canda in the Province of Rovigo
- Facade of the Duomo of Schio, while the entrance stairs were designed by Giovanni Battista Meduna
- Main altar of the parish church of San Bonifacio
- Parish church and bell-tower at Piovene Rocchette
- Bell-tower at Breganze
- Altars for the church of San Pietro, Belluno
- Bell-tower of San Vito, Asolo
- Oratory in Casa Trevisan in Mogliano Veneto

Church of San Donato di Piave

== Bibliography ==
- Palladio, la sua eredità nel mondo (in Italian). Electa. 1980.
- Storia dell'architettura italiana: L'Ottocento (in Italian). Electa. 2005. ISBN 978-88-435-4893-4.
