= La Fenice =

Opera house in Venice, Italy

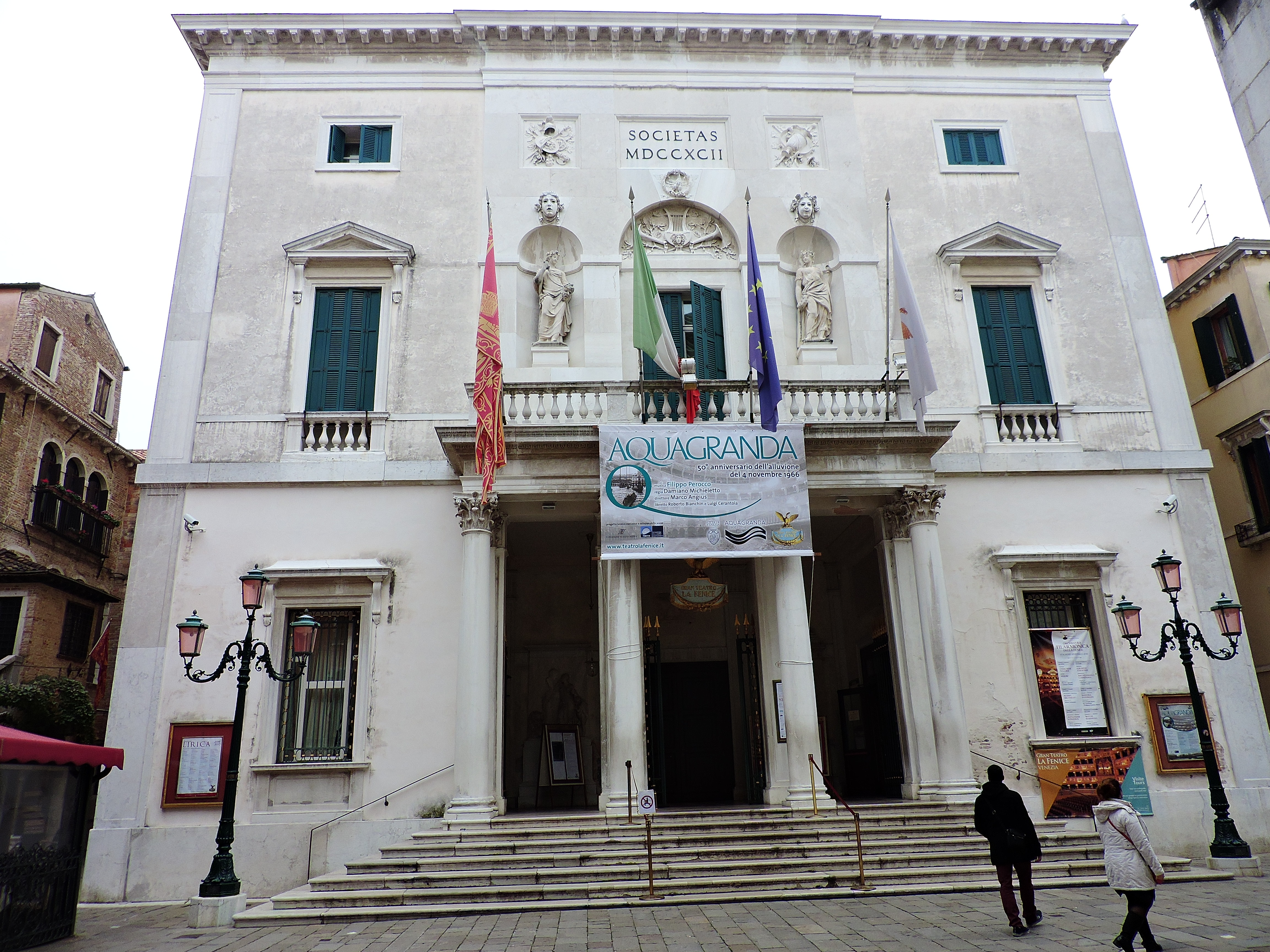
- Interactive map of La Fenice
- Address: Venice; Italy
- Coordinates: 45.4337°N 12.3339°E
- Owner: City of Venice
- Capacity: 1126

Construction
- Opened: 1792
- Reopened: 1837; 2003
- Architects: Gianantonio Selva; Tommaso Meduna and Giovanni Battista Meduna; Aldo Rossi

Website
- www.teatrolafenice.it

Teatro La Fenice (pronounced [teˈaːtro la feˈniːtʃe]; "The Phoenix Theatre") is a historic opera house in Venice, Italy. It is one of "the most famous and renowned landmarks in the history of Italian theatre" and in the history of opera as a whole. Especially in the 19th century, La Fenice became the site of many famous operatic premieres at which several works by the four major bel canto era composers—Rossini, Bellini, Donizetti, and Verdi—were performed.

Its name reflects its role in permitting an opera company to "rise from the ashes" despite losing the use of three theatres to fire, the first in 1774 after the city's leading house was destroyed and rebuilt but not opened until 1792; the second fire came in 1836, but rebuilding was completed within a year. The third fire was the result of arson, and destroyed the house in 1996 leaving only the exterior walls; it was rebuilt and re-opened in November 2004. In order to celebrate this event, the tradition of the Venice New Year's Concert started.

Through the years, the greatest conductors in the world have performed at La Fenice, including Giuseppe Martucci, Arturo Toscanini, Richard Strauss, Pietro Mascagni, Leonard Bernstein, Leopold Stokowski, Fritz Reiner, Tullio Serafin, John Barbirolli, Guido Cantelli, Dimitri Mitropoulos, Herbert von Karajan, Karl Böhm, Claudio Abbado, and Riccardo Muti.

== History ==
Seven old theaters were active in Venice at the end of the eighteenth century, two for the production of plays and the others for music. The grandest of these was the Teatro San Benedetto, which stood on the site currently occupied by the Rossini cinema. Built by the Grimani family in 1755, it was subsequently assigned to the Nobile Società di Palchettisti (Noble Association of Box-holders). However, following a judicial ruling in 1787, this association was expelled and forced to give up the opera house to the noble Venier family, the owners of the land on which it was built. The association immediately proposed building a larger and more sumptuous opera house than the one it had lost, which would become the symbol of their changing fortunes and their capacity for ′rebirth′. It was therefore to be called La Fenice, like the mythical, immortal bird able to rise out of its own ashes, to symbolise the association's splendid rebirth after its misfortunes.

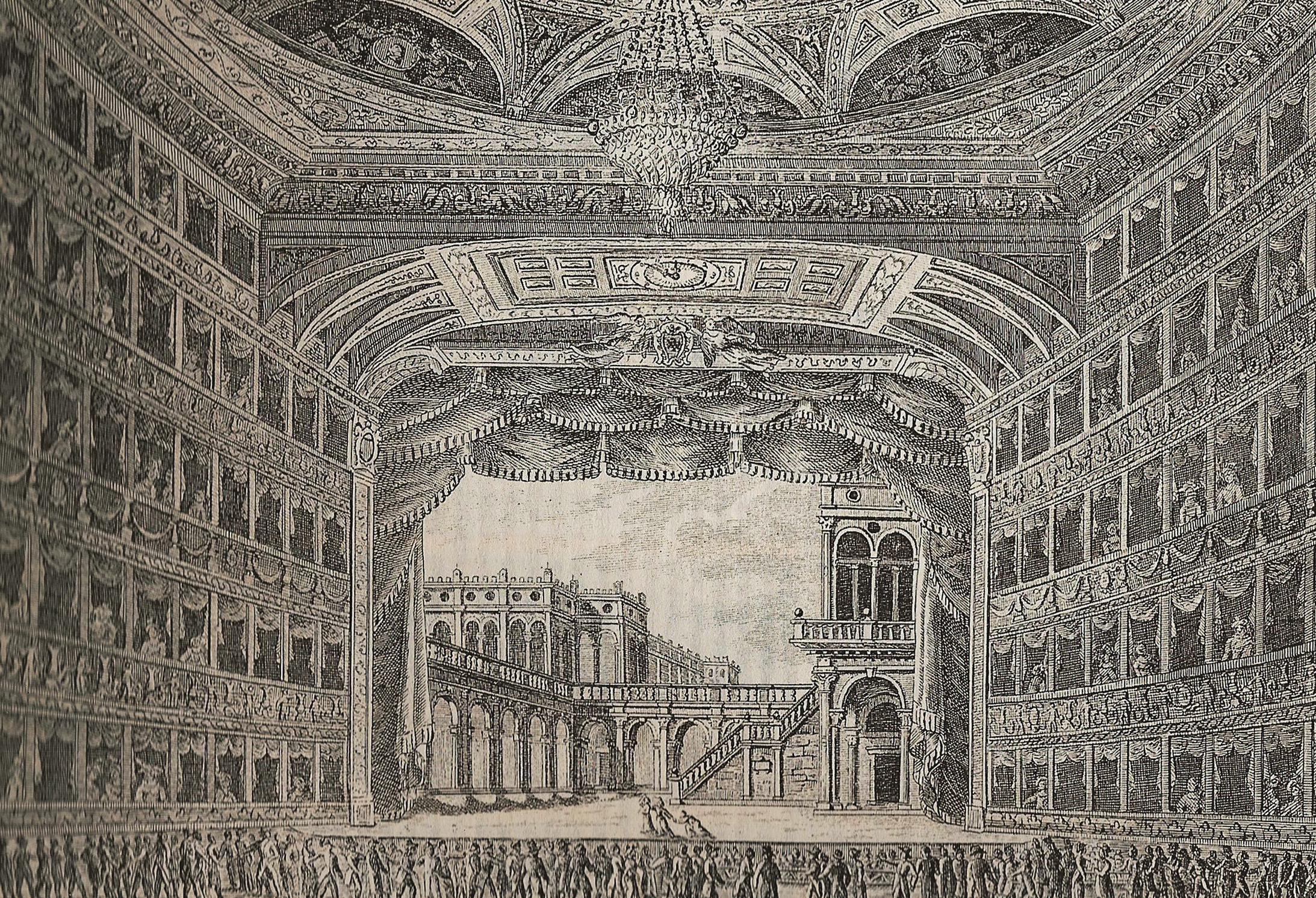
Interior of first theatre, 1829

The piece of land between Contrada Santa Maria Zobenigo and Contrada Sant'Angelo was bought for the purpose in 1790 and the private houses on it were demolished. A competition was then announced for the design of the opera house, and the committee of experts selected the work of the architect Giannantonio Selva from the 29 plans submitted. Work began in 1791 and was completed just 18 months later, in April 1792. La Fenice immediately made its mark as one of the leading opera houses, noted in Italy and Europe both for the high artistic quality of its work and the splendour of its building. But, almost as if the name were the bearer of bad omens, on the night of 13 December 1836 the opera house was devastated by a first fire caused by a recently installed Austrian heater. The newspapers said it took three days and three nights to put out the fire and that various hotspots were still smouldering among the debris 18 days later. The flames entirely destroyed the house, and only the foyer and the Sale Apollinee were saved. The association decided to proceed with its immediate reconstruction. It appointed the architect Giambattista Meduna and his engineer brother Tommaso to carry out the work, while Tranquillo Orsi was responsible for the decorations. The work began in February 1837 and performances were temporarily staged in the Teatro Apollo (previously the San Luca, now Goldoni).

Everything was completed in record time. By the evening of 26 December of the same year, the new opera house, reborn in the new artistic style of the age, was opened to the public. The speed of the work, however, led to urgent restoration works to the framework being required as early as 1854 and, again under the direction of Giambattista Meduna, the house was redecorated in a style that remained unchanged until 1996. On 23 July 1935 the box-holder owners ceded their share in the opera house to the Comune di Venezia, so it went from private to public ownership, and in 1937-8 part of building was subject to further major restorations and alterations by engineer Eugenio Miozzi. On the night of 29 January 1996, during a period of closure for restoration works, a second fire – as the Myth said – this time arson, completely destroyed the house and most of the Sale Apollinee. Once again La Fenice rose again, faithfully reconstructed to a plan by the architect Aldo Rossi, and was reopened on 14 December 2003.

=== First theatre ===
In 1774, the Teatro San Benedetto, which had been Venice's leading opera house for more than forty years, burned to the ground. By 1789, with interest from a number of wealthy opera lovers who wanted a spectacular new house, "a carefully defined competition" was organised to find a suitable architect. It was won by Gianantonio Selva who proposed a neoclassical style building with 170 identical boxes in tiers in a traditional horseshoe shaped auditorium, which had been the favoured style since it was introduced as early as 1642 in Venice. The house would face on one side a campo, or small plaza, and on the other a canal, with an entrance which gave direct access backstage and into the theatre.

However, the process was not without controversy especially in regard to the aesthetics of the building. Some thirty responses were received and, as Romanelli accounts, Selva's was designated as the design to be constructed, the actual award for best design went to his chief rival, Pietro Bianchi. However, Selva's design and finished opera house appears to have been of high quality and the one best suited to the limitations of the physical space it was obliged to inhabit.

Construction began in June 1790, and by May 1792 the theatre was completed. It was named "La Fenice", in reference to the company's survival, first of the fire, then of the loss of its former quarters. La Fenice was inaugurated on 16 May 1792, with an opera by Giovanni Paisiello entitled I giuochi d'Agrigento set to a libretto by Alessandro Pepoli.

But no sooner had the opera house been rebuilt than a legal dispute broke out between the company managing it and the owners, the Venier family. The issue was decided in favor of the Veniers.

At the beginning of the 19th century, La Fenice acquired a European reputation. Rossini mounted two major productions there: Tancredi in 1813 and Semiramide in 1823. Two of Bellini's operas were given their premieres there: I Capuleti e i Montecchi in March 1830 and Beatrice di Tenda in March 1833. Donizetti, fresh from his triumphs at La Scala in Milan and at the Teatro di San Carlo in Naples, returned to Venice in 1836 with his Belisario, after an absence of seventeen years.

=== Second theatre ===
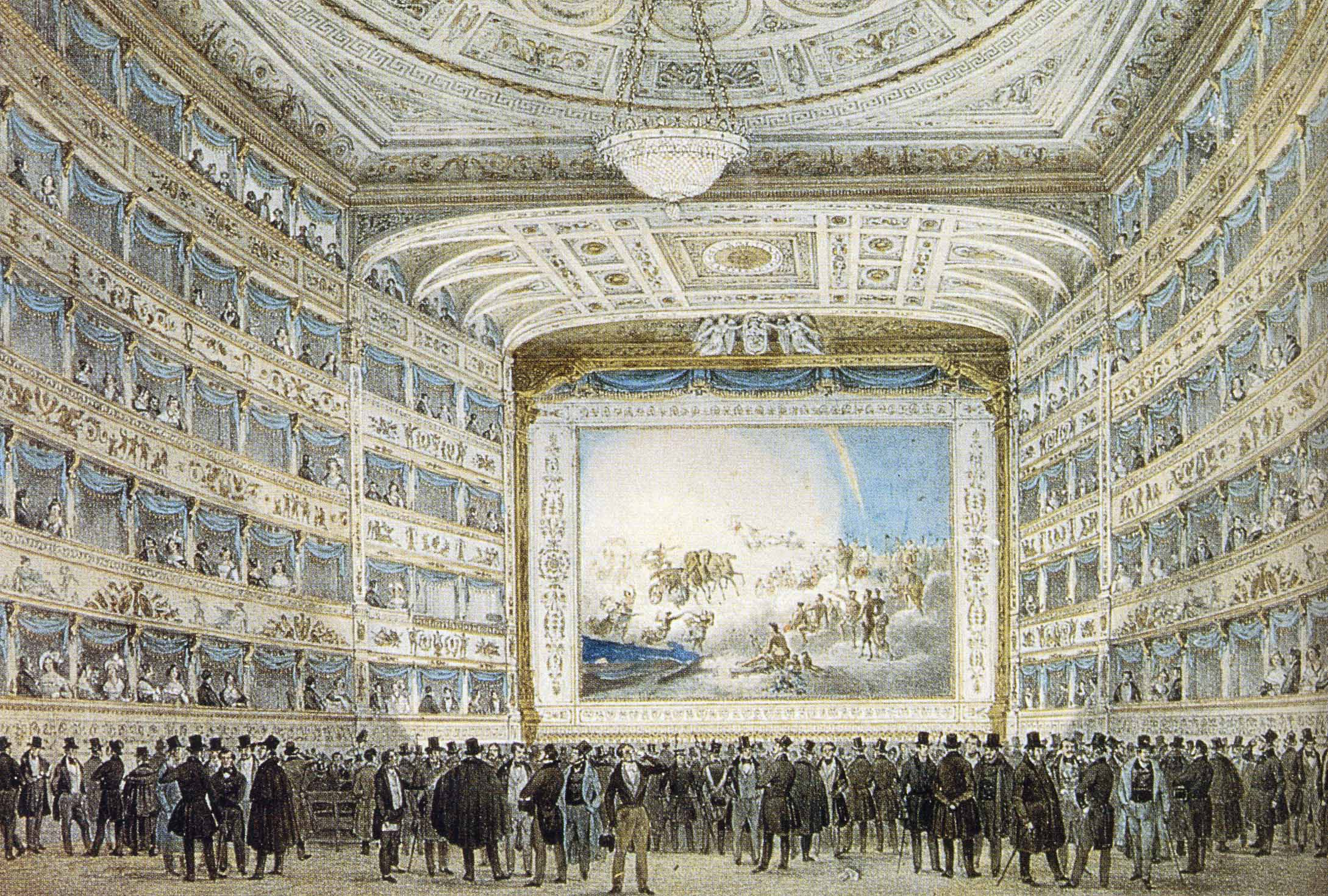
Interior of La Fenice in 1837

In December 1836, disaster struck again when the theatre was destroyed by fire. However, it was quickly rebuilt with a design provided by the architect-engineer team of the brothers Tommaso and Giovanni Battista Meduna. The interior displays a late-Empire luxury of gilt decorations, plushy extravagance and stucco. La Fenice once again rose from its ashes to open its doors on the evening of 26 December 1837.

Giuseppe Verdi's association with La Fenice began in 1844, with the premiere performance of Ernani during the carnival season. Over the next 13 years, the premieres of Attila, Rigoletto, La traviata, and Simon Boccanegra took place there.

During the First World War, La Fenice was closed, but it reopened to become the scene of much activity, attracting many of the world's greatest singers and conductors. In 1930, the Venice Biennale initiated the First International Festival of Contemporary Music, which brought such composers as Stravinsky and Britten, and more recently Berio, Nono, and Bussotti, to write for La Fenice.

On 29 January 1996, La Fenice was completely destroyed by fire. Only its acoustics were preserved, since Lamberto Tronchin, an Italian acoustician, had measured the acoustics two months earlier.

Arson was immediately suspected. In March 2001, a court in Venice found two electricians, Enrico Carella and his cousin Massimiliano Marchetti, guilty of setting the fire. They appeared to have set the building ablaze because their company was facing heavy fines over delays in repair work in which they were engaged. Carella, the company's owner, disappeared after a final appeal was turned down. He had been sentenced to seven years in prison. Marchetti surrendered and served a six-year sentence. Ultimately, Carella was arrested in February 2007 at the Mexico-Belize border, was extradited to Italy, and was released on day parole after serving 16 months.

=== Present theatre ===
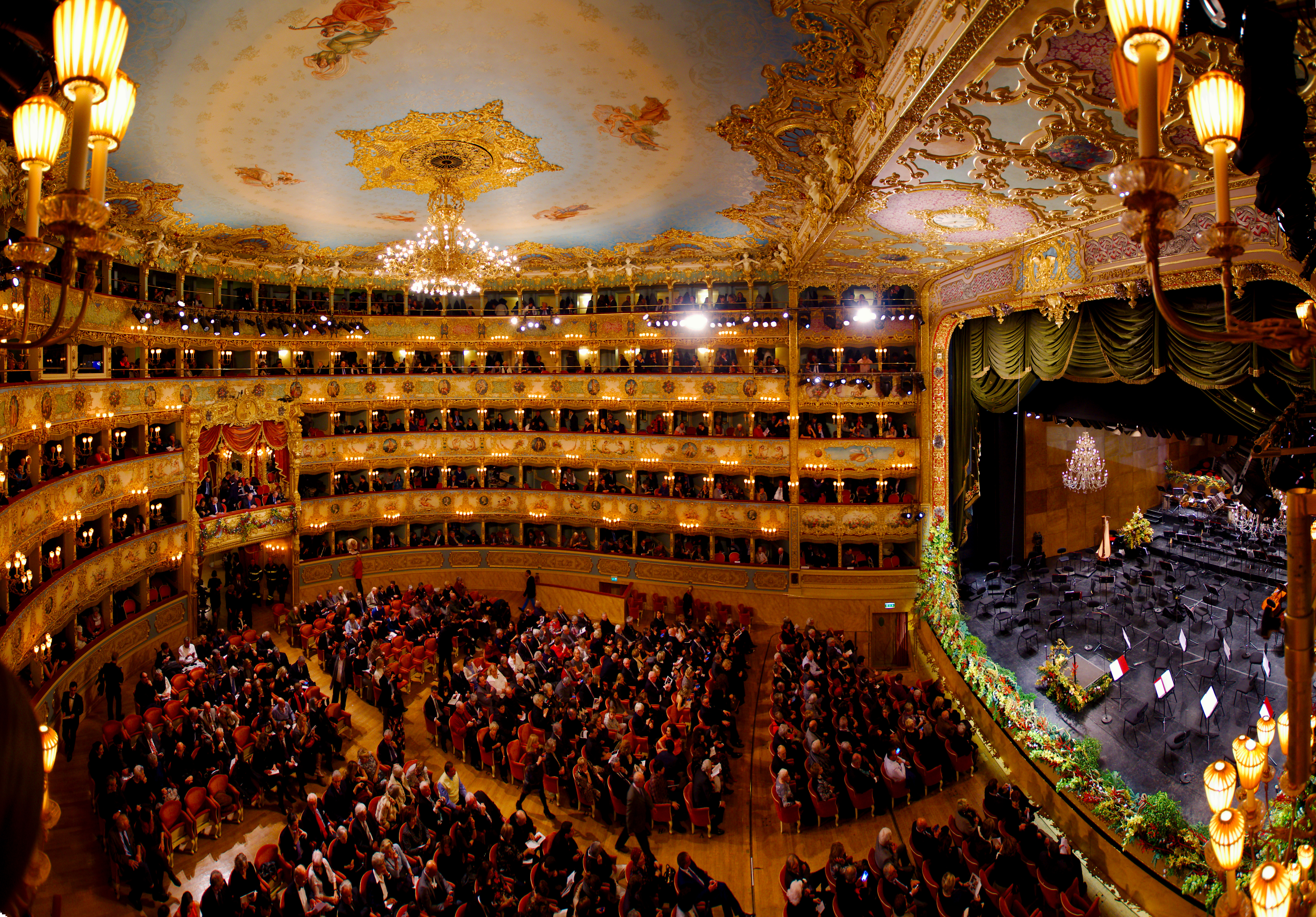
Interior of La Fenice in 2015

After various delays, reconstruction began in earnest in 2001. In 650 days, a team of 200 plasterers, artists, woodworkers, and other craftsmen succeeded in recreating the ambiance of the old theatre, at a cost of some €90 million. As Gillian Price notes, "This time round, thanks to an enlightened project by late Italian architect Aldo Rossi and the motto 'how it was, where it was', it has been fitted out with extra rehearsal areas and state-of-the-art stage equipment, while the seating capacity has been increased from 840 to 1000."

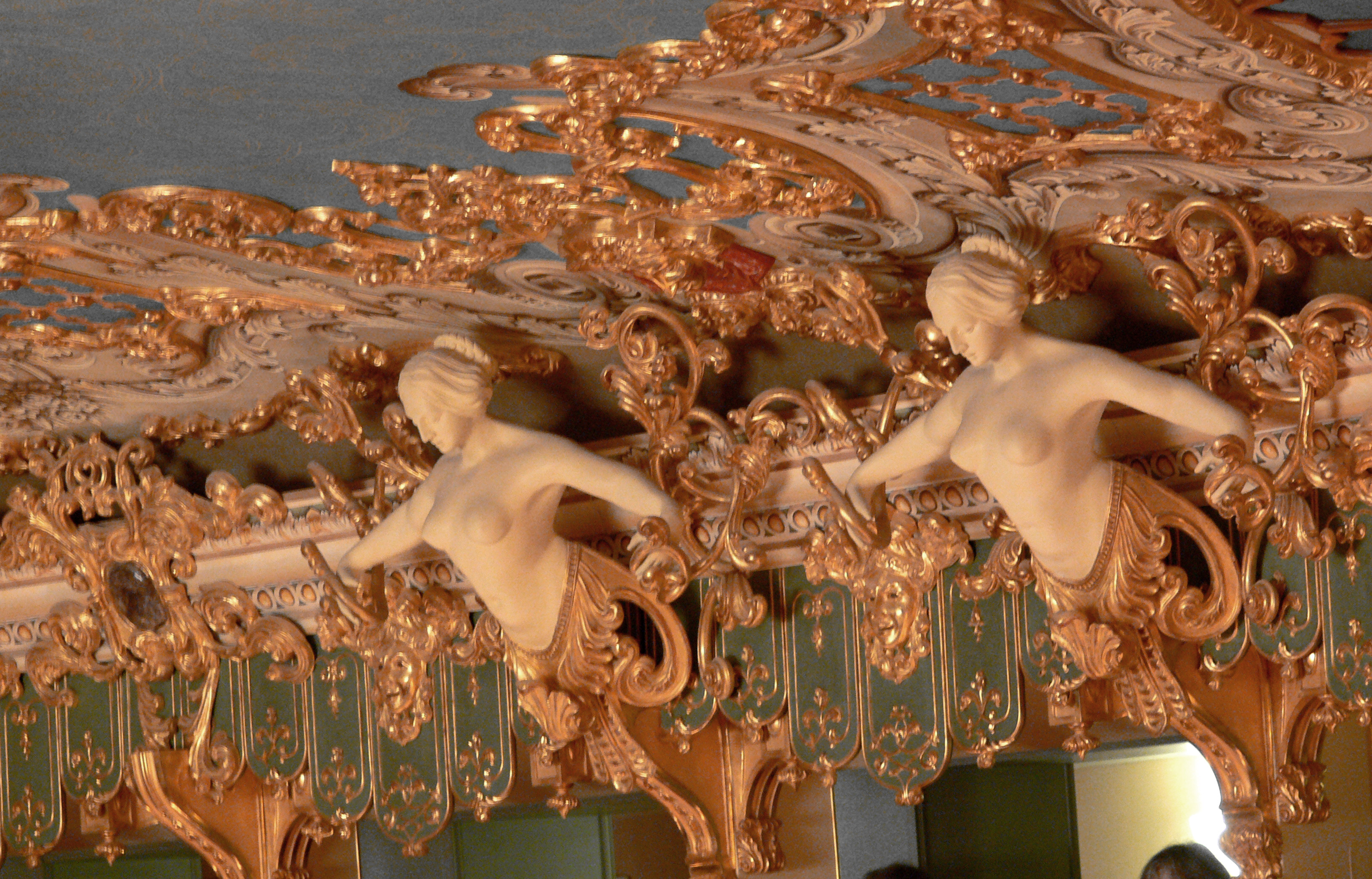
Detail of the decoration

La Fenice was rebuilt in 19th-century style on the basis of a design by architect Aldo Rossi who, in order to obtain details of its design, used still photographs from the opening scenes of Luchino Visconti's film Senso (1954), which had been filmed in the house. La Fenice reopened on 14 December 2003 with an inaugural concert of Beethoven, Wagner, and Stravinsky. The first staged opera was a production of La traviata, in November 2004.

Critical response to the rebuilt La Fenice was mixed. The music critic of the paper Il Tempo, Enrico Cavalotti, was satisfied. He found the colours a bit bright but the sound good and compact. However, for his colleague Dino Villatico of the La Repubblica, the acoustics of the new hall lacked resonance, and the colours were painfully bright. He found it "kitsch, a fake imitation of the past". He said that "the city should have had the nerve to build a completely new theater; Venice betrayed its innovative past by ignoring it".

== Artistic notes ==
=== Façade ===
Built in 1792 to a plan by the architect Giannantonio Selva, the façade of the building is the only element to have completely survived the two fires that almost entirely destroyed the opera house in 1836 and 1996. Unlike the other theaters in the city, whose entrances are in secluded places like alleys and small squares, La Fenice is the only historic Venetian theatre facing onto an open space, Campo San Fantin. It is also the only one to feature a colonnade in neo-classical style in its façade. This bears the theatre's insignia in the centre portraying the phoenix that rises from the flames, carved in 1837 to design by Giambattista Meduna. The façade features two statues in niches representing the muses of tragedy and dance: Melpomene and Terpsichore. Above them are the masks of Comedy and Tragedy, thought to be by Domenico Fadiga. The first sculptures that adorned the entrance to the opera house, in terracotta and carved in Baroque style, were attributed to either Giuseppe Bernardi or his nephew Giovanni Ferrari, both of whom taught Canova. They were replaced in 1875 as they were in an advanced state of decay and were in any case thought incompatible, if restored, with the classical style of the façade. The two new statues were made in Custoza stone by Augusto Benvenuti in a new style that better suited the building. All trace of the original sculptures was lost after the theatre management sold them to Benvenuti in 1876. Two commemorative stelae were placed in the entrance vestibule after the 1837 reconstruction. The one on the right, sculpted in that year by Antonio Giaccarelli to an original design by Giambattista Meduna, is attributed to the architect Giannantonio Selva. The one on the left, in honour of the playwright Carlo Goldoni, is by Luigi Zandomeneghi and was moved from the atrium where it had been dedicated on 26 December 1830. The new sign of the opera house, in gold and blue, again to a design By Meduna, was also placed above the entrance in 1837.

=== Foyer ===
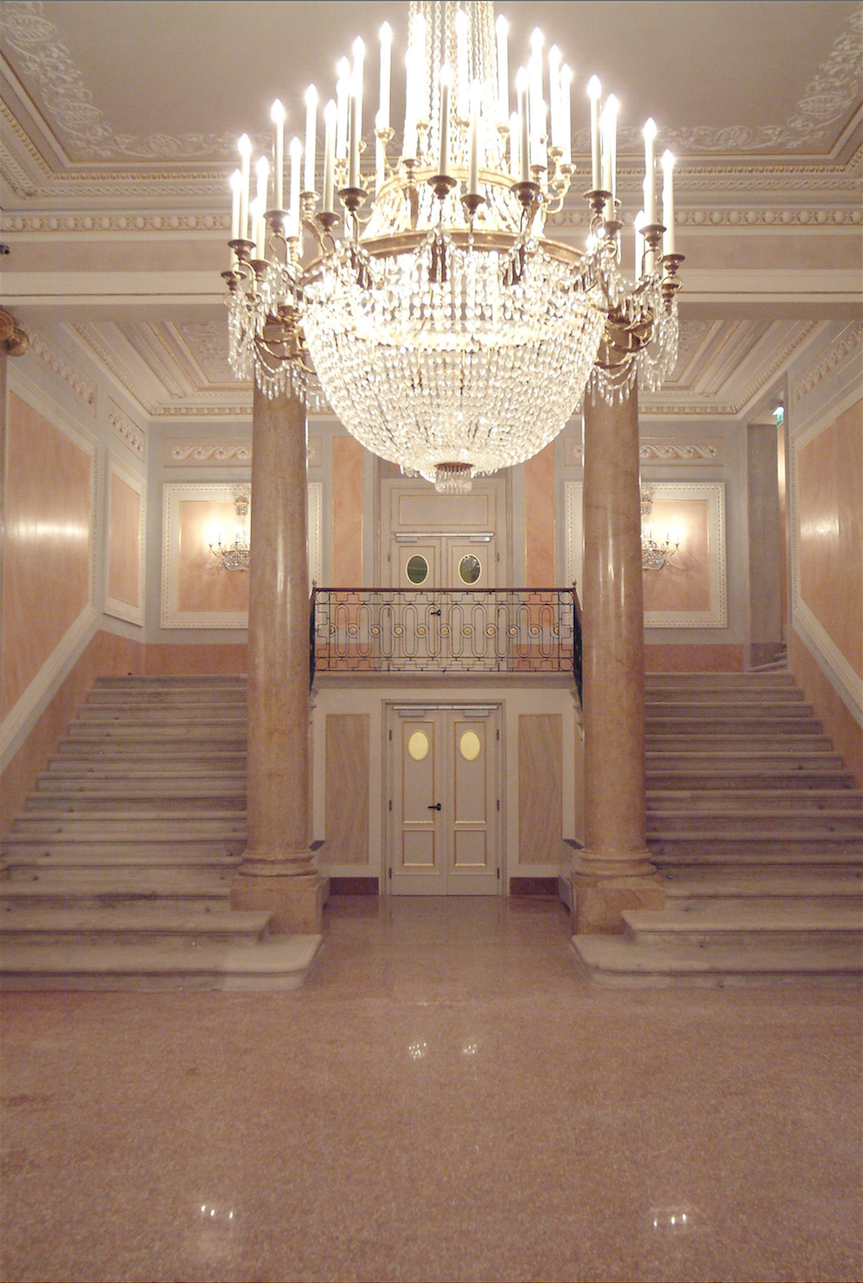
Part of the Foyer of La Fenice

Escaping entirely unharmed from the first fire that destroyed the original La Fenice Opera House on the night of December 1836, the entrance, by Selva, was enlarged in 1937 as part of the upgrading works directed by the engineer Eugenio Miozzi. On that same occasion some walls that divided the right side of the foyer into several spaces were demolished to make this side the mirror image, in shape and decoration, of the left. A commemorative plaque recording the box-holder owner's transfer of shares to the Comune di Venezia in 1935 was then placed in the right wing. It was precisely thanks to this work, which also included restoration, that the foyer and the Sale Apollinee on the upper floor managed to partly withstand the collapse of the floor and the wall against the stairs to the boxes following the fire of 29 January 1996. The opera house entrance is therefore the area in which the largest number of original elements of the building survive: part of the decoration and most of the columns, the floor and the access stairs to the boxes.

=== House ===
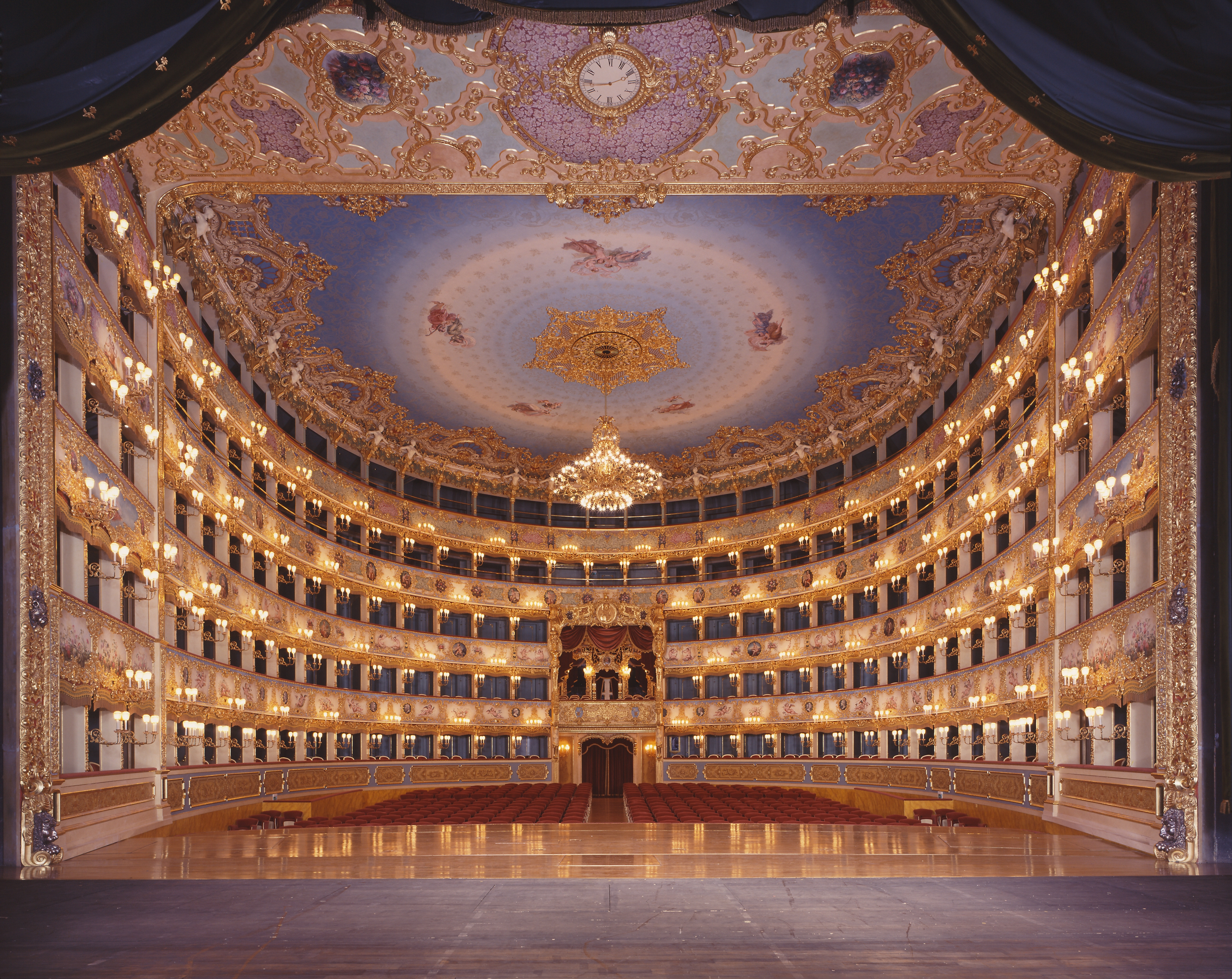
La Fenice Opera House from the stage

The fire of 1996 completely destroyed the five tiers of boxes, the stage and the ceiling, leaving only the perimeter walls on the original house.

Reconstruction was based on the architect Aldo Rossi's design, keeping to the motto "As it was, where it was," which had been applied to the rebuilding of St Mark's bell Campanile, exactly the same as the original and taking ten years, after it collapsed in 1902. The faithful reconstruction of the house was facilitated by the comprehensive treatise on the reconstruction that had been drawn up by the Meduna brothers after the work carried out following the first fire of 1836. Reconstruction of the decorations in the house, in a Rococo style, was based mainly on consultation of the considerable photographic archive on the opera house held in the theatre's historic archive. In order to speed up the work, two procedures were adopted.

Reconstruction of the masonry and wooden framing of the building was carried out in the opera house itself by hundreds of workers employed 24 hours a day, seven days a week, while the decorative components were constructed at the same time in various external workshops so that these would be ready for application once the structural work was complete. The same nineteenth-century materials were used: papier-mache, wood, and plaster for all ornamentation of the royal box and the entrance, the 22 Nereids that are part of the cornice of the so-called soffittone (ceiling), and the four putti in the royal box. The guiding principle was that of recreating the original house, particularly its specific technical solution based mainly on the use of wood, carefully chosen and treated to obtain the best acoustic response. The big soundbox of the wooden house was enclosed in a protective envelope of masonry and reinforced concrete floors.

The only decorative element built at least partly on site was the ceiling, which reproduces the original design, giving the optical illusion of a vaulted ceiling. It features paintings of several female figures, some of whom are carrying musical instruments, and young maidens representing the Graces, Music, Dance and Aurora. The chandelier is a reproduction of the English original in gilt bronze, commissioned by the Meduna brothers from craftsmen in Liverpool in 1854. The arms of the sconces in the boxes were also made following the model of a single surviving example.

The main theme of the house decorations, dating from 1854, is a reproduction of a forest with acanthus leaves depicted in the papier-mache decorations, subsequently enriched with 23-carat gold leaf worked using the quartz technique and polished with agate. The paintings outside the boxes have cherubs with musical instruments or in playful mood. The first tier also includes the profiles of classical poets, while the second features six allegories representing History, Poetry, Philosophy, Comedy, Tragedy, and Music.

On the third tier are putti holding tablets engraved with the titles and authors of 14 of the most important operas staged in the house.

A significant innovation in the appearance of the house was made by a radical change of color inside the individual boxes. The original shade of beige has now been replaced by a blue-green pastel color.

The current access to the stalls was designed by the engineer Miozzi in 1937 and decorated at the sides with two plaster caryatids. The house originally had two small entrances in the section now occupied by the first on the right of the current access, which until the second half of the 1930s was taken up by three boxes in the first tier.

The orchestra pit now has a moveable platform. When the pit is not required, the platform can be raised to the level of the stalls, allowing some rows of additional seats to be added to the front, increasing capacity by 104 to 1,126. The moveable platform, which consists of two elements, can also be completely or partially raised to the level of the stage in order to enlarge it.

The curtain was reproduced on the basis of an examination of historic documentation, in dark-green, deep nap, fire-resistant synthetic velvet decorated with 1,100 flowers in gilt leather.

The new stage is accompanied by a second lateral stage onto which the stage equipment now moves sideways for construction and handling of the scenery.

=== Royal box ===
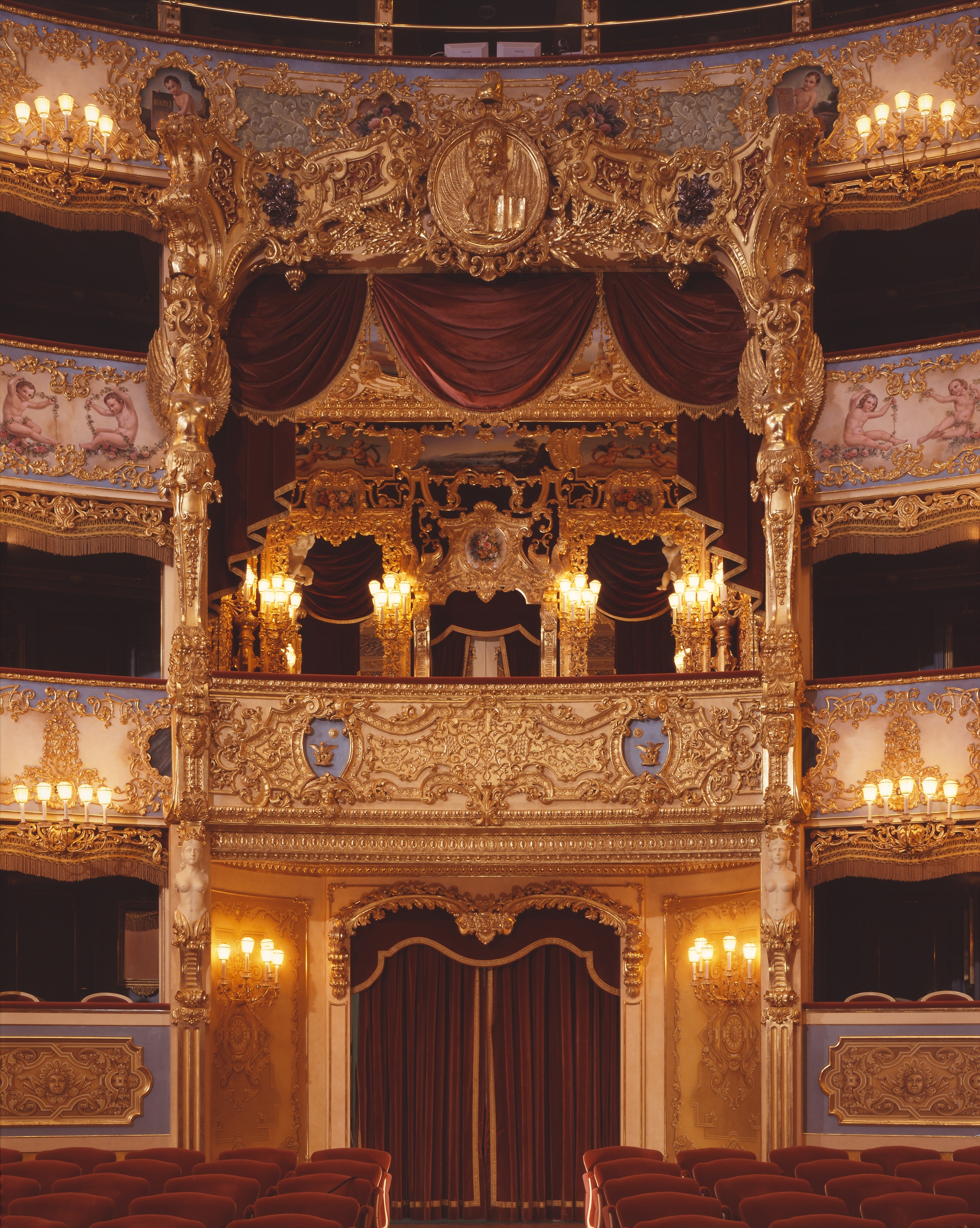
La Fenice Opera House, The Royal Box

The place of honor in the house has a tormented existence, relating not only to the history of the opera house but also to the political and historic events of the city of Venice.

The royal box was not part of Giannantonio Selva's original plan for La Fenice; at the time of its construction the house contained only boxes of the same size. Venice had lost its independence in May 1797 to the First French Empire, which then handed the city over to the Austro-Hungarian empire for eight years following the Treaty of Campoformio in 1797, and in 1805 Venice once again came under French rule. The first imperial loggia was built only provisionally in 1807 to accommodate the emperor, Napoleon, who was expected in the opera house on Tuesday 1 December 1807 for a performance of the cantata Il Giudizio di Giove by Lauro Corniani Algarotti. Its construction required the demolition of three central boxes in both the second and third tiers.

In 1808 the architect Giannantonio Selva built the definitive model with the assistance of Giuseppe Borsato on the decorations. This was destroyed by the fire that struck La Fenice in December 1836, and was rebuilt along with the rest of the house by the Meduna brothers in 1837, with the assistance of Giuseppe Borsato, who increased the splendor of the decorations. Following the Congress of Vienna in 1815, Venice once again found itself under Habsburg rule. At the end of March 1848, following insurrectionary uprising and the Republic of Venice's consequent declaration of independence from Austria, the loggia was taken down so that the original tiers of boxes could be reinstated in the so-called "Republican" house. The six boxes that had been in the center of the house until the beginning of the nineteenth century were therefore rebuilt. However, the Imperial Austrian Royal Government then returned, and on 22 August 1849 ordered reconstruction of the loggia in its original form. The decorations were entrusted once again to Giuseppe Borsato who, now over 70, remade them to a richer design than before. This was his last work; his box was presented in January 1850 in the presence of his widow Maria Bonadei Borsato. The imperial loggia finally became the royal box in 1866 with the Veneto entrance into the Kingdom of Italy.

The symbol of the Italian royal family can still be seen inside the box, reproduced on the side walls. There was a third Savoy shield on the crown of the external cornice, but this was removed after the republican victory in the referendum of 2 June 1946 and replaced with the lion of St Mark, the symbol of Venice. There are some ivory-painted wooden putti in the corners of the walls on four gilt, wooden candelabra. On the papier mache-decorated wooden ceiling there is a reproduction of the painting Apotheosis of the Sciences and the Arts, originally by the painter Leonardo Gavagnin. The royal box also offers its guests the use of a private room, which has its own private entrance.

=== Sale Apollinee ===
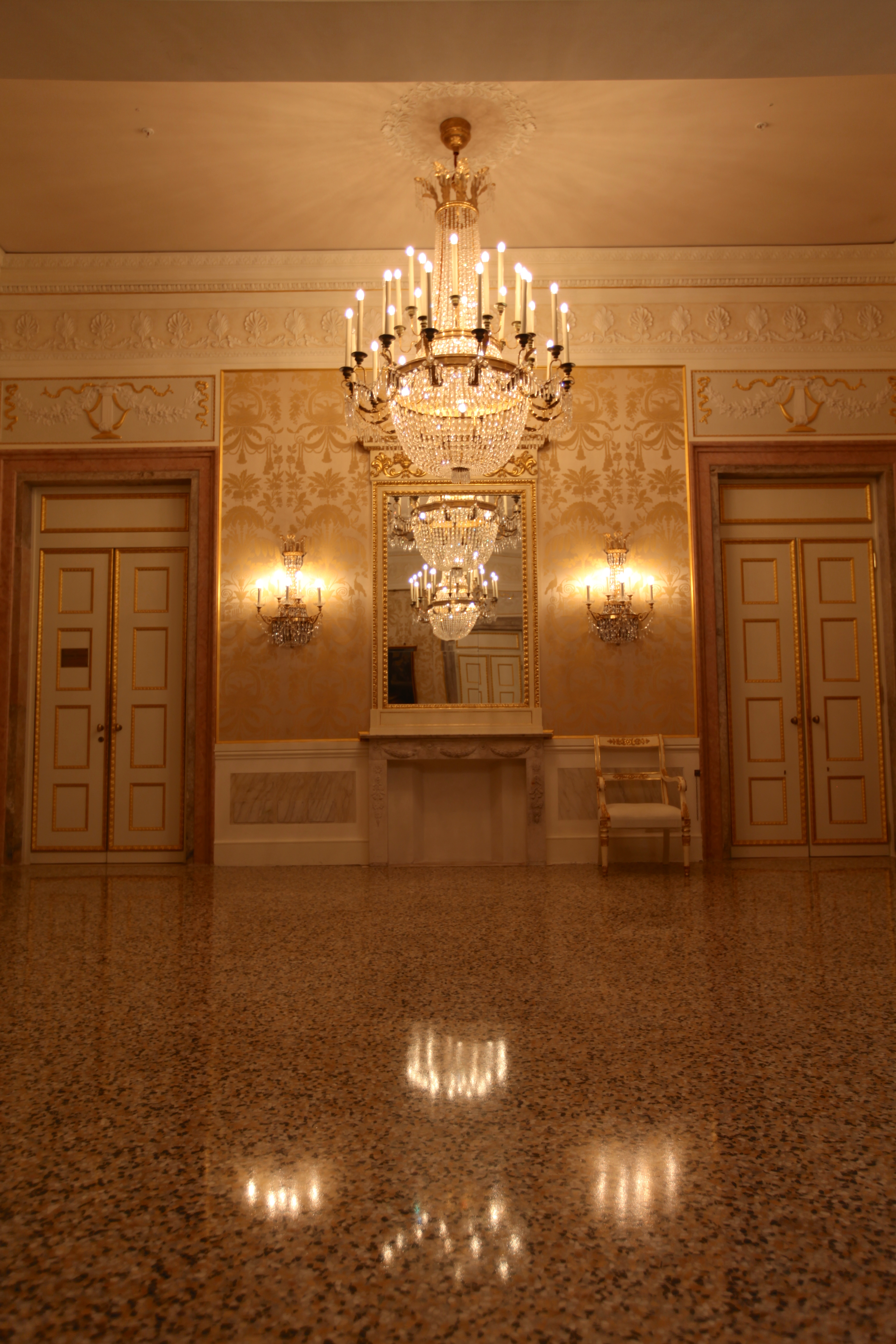
The Sala Ammannati is a part of the Sale Apollinee at La Fenice Opera House in Venice

The Sale Apollinee, so named because dedicated to the Greek god Apollo, father of the Muses and patron of the Arts, including music, consists of five rooms whose current layout dates from 1937. These rooms are now used during the intervals by the audience occupying the first three tiers of boxes and the stalls. The five rooms of the Sale Apollinee were originally used even when there was no show in the opera house; its bar would be open during the day and there was a billiard table in one of the rooms.

On the top of the main door is a symbol of the sun, a tribute to the King of France Louis XIV. The Apollon room was thought of as a ballet room; ballet came to prominence in part because of Louis XIV's interest in it. He performed a series of dances in Ballet Royal de la Nuit, in the final piece as Apollo in a costume with a kilt of golden rays—and thus became known as the Sun King. La Fenice was built in tribute to the god Apollo.

Unlike the house, which was completely destroyed by the enormous fire of 1996, about a fifth of these rooms survived. The surviving fragments can be easily recognized, as the precise intention of the reconstruction work was that it highlight the difference between the historic sections and the recent additions. The original parts of the ceiling cornices and remaining ornamental stuccoes on the walls are darker in color, in testimony of the last fire. The same difference can be seen in the marble frames of some of the doors, repaired with new marble of a different color, and in the new flooring, which merges with the typical Venetian terrazzo that remained in the room dedicated to the famous singer Maria Malibran.

Thanks to these completions, the Sale Apollinee has been rebuilt on the basis of the originals, though a wider range of choice was conceded than in the house, shown by the new upholstery and furnishings in these rooms.

==== Sala Dante ====
The main bar is in the Sala Dante, named after the frescoes that once decorated its walls.

This room was inaugurated in 1865 on the occasion of the sixth centenary of the birth of Dante Alighieri. To celebrate the event, the painter Giacomo Casa created a large composition within the decorative ceiling frame, showing Italy in the act of crowning the great poet and six tempera fresco paintings on the walls, with the same number of scenes from the Divine Comedy. Two of these were then replaced in 1867 with others in tempera by Antonio Ermolao Paoletti.

In September 1976 the walls and ceiling of this room, renamed the Sala Guidi, were decorated with works by the Venetian painter Virgilio Guidi, which covered the scenes from Dante. The fire of 1996, however, destroyed these canvases, bringing back to light some fragments of the original decoration by Casa, which have now been completed with a sinopia to assist their reading.

==== Sala Grande ====
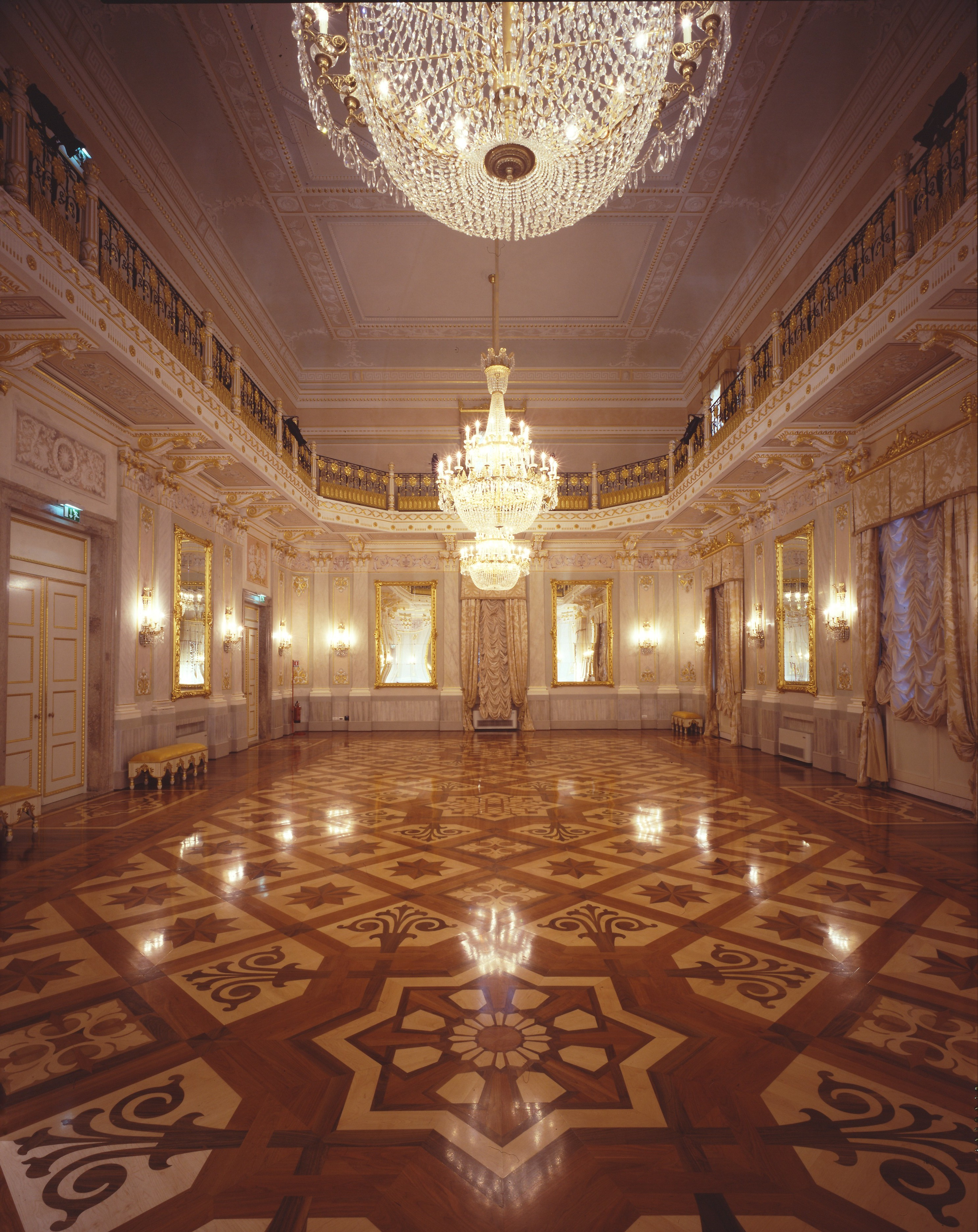
The Sala Grande or ballroom is the main room of the five Sale Apollinee, lit by three windows in the middle of the entrance façade

The Sala Grande or ballroom is he main room of the five Sale Apollinee, lit by the three windows in the middle of the entrance façade.

Used over the years for different purposes, the Sala Grande was an elegant venue for balls, chamber music concerts, conferences or book launches, and (before La Fenice was provided with special rooms for them) rehearsals. It was also used by the governing board in 1935. Almost completely destroyed on the night of 29 January 1996, the Sala Grande has been faithfully reconstructed to the original model.

The floor, which is above the foyer, collapsed after the fire and only the corners were saved. The current floor has been faithfully rebuilt to the original model and its characteristic floral patterns reproduced, requiring the use of various types of wood: maple, olive, and cherry. The color of the walls is also the same as the original. A gallery runs around the circumference of the upper part of the room, with access from the three doors on the top floor.

== New rooms ==
"As it was, where it was", the motto for reconstruction of La Fenice, called for the opera house to be rebuilt as it was before the 1996 fire. This principle, however, was seen applying only to the rooms of particular historic and artistic importance. The opportunity was therefore taken to redesign the parts of the building that did not come into this category, resulting in the creation of three new rooms.

== In fiction ==
Donna Leon's debut novel, Death at La Fenice (1992), the first in her Commissario (Detective) Guido Brunetti detective series, centers on a mystery surrounding the sensational death by cyanide poisoning of a famous orchestra conductor, in the midst of a production of La traviata at La Fenice. In several scenes the opera house is described in meticulous detail, as it was at the time of writing, prior to the third fire.

In the video game 'Tomb Raider 2 starring Lara Croft' developed by British game studio Core Design and released in 1996, the fourth level "Opera House" is based on the famous opera. In the game the house is in a decrepit state designed to account for the puzzles and platforming the main character has to go through, coincidentally mirroring the real life state of the building at the time. The level is superseded by two others also taking place in the canals of Venice.

== See also ==
- Berendt, John, The City of Falling Angels, New York: The Penguin Press, 2005 ISBN 1-59420-058-0. The book centres on the fire that destroyed La Fenice for the second time and its aftermath.
- Opera houses and theatres of Venice
