= Giovanni Battista Meduna =

Italian architect

Giovanni Battista (Giambattista) Meduna (11 Jun 1800 – 27 April 1886), knight and Commander of the Order of Saints Maurice and Lazarus, was an Italian architect from Venice.

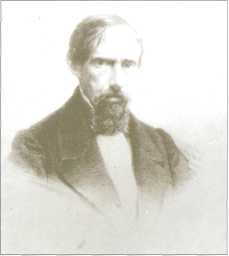
Giovanni Battista Meduna

== Biography ==
He was the son of Venetian carpenter and window maker Andrea Meduna and a descendant of the Meduna family.

Meduna studied architecture under Gian Antonio Selva and after his death under Antonio Diedo and Francesco Lazzari.

He was lieutenant of the Guardia Civica during the 1848–1849 revolutions, a member of the Comitato Segreto di Venezia at the time of the Italian Risorgimento against the Austrian Empire, working in connection with the municipal council not recognized by Austria. When it assumed power, he was called to be part of it.

He often collaborated with his brother Tommaso Meduna (1798–1880), engineer and designer of the first railway bridge between Venice and the mainland in 1836.

His first son Leopoldo was born in 1837. He was a student at Venice high school and knight of the Order of Saints Maurice and Lazarus. He died on 8 September 1855 at the age of eighteen.

Leopoldo's younger brother Cesare was born on 27 October 1841, and resided in Campo San Vidal, Venice. As a student in Padua, where he obtained a degree in engineering, Cesare Meduna, like his father, was also part of the Comitato Segreto. After serving in municipal positions in Zelarino he briefly became the mayor after the death of Ugo Paccagnella in 1905, until his own passing a few months later in 1906, when he was replaced by Paccagnella' son Alberto.

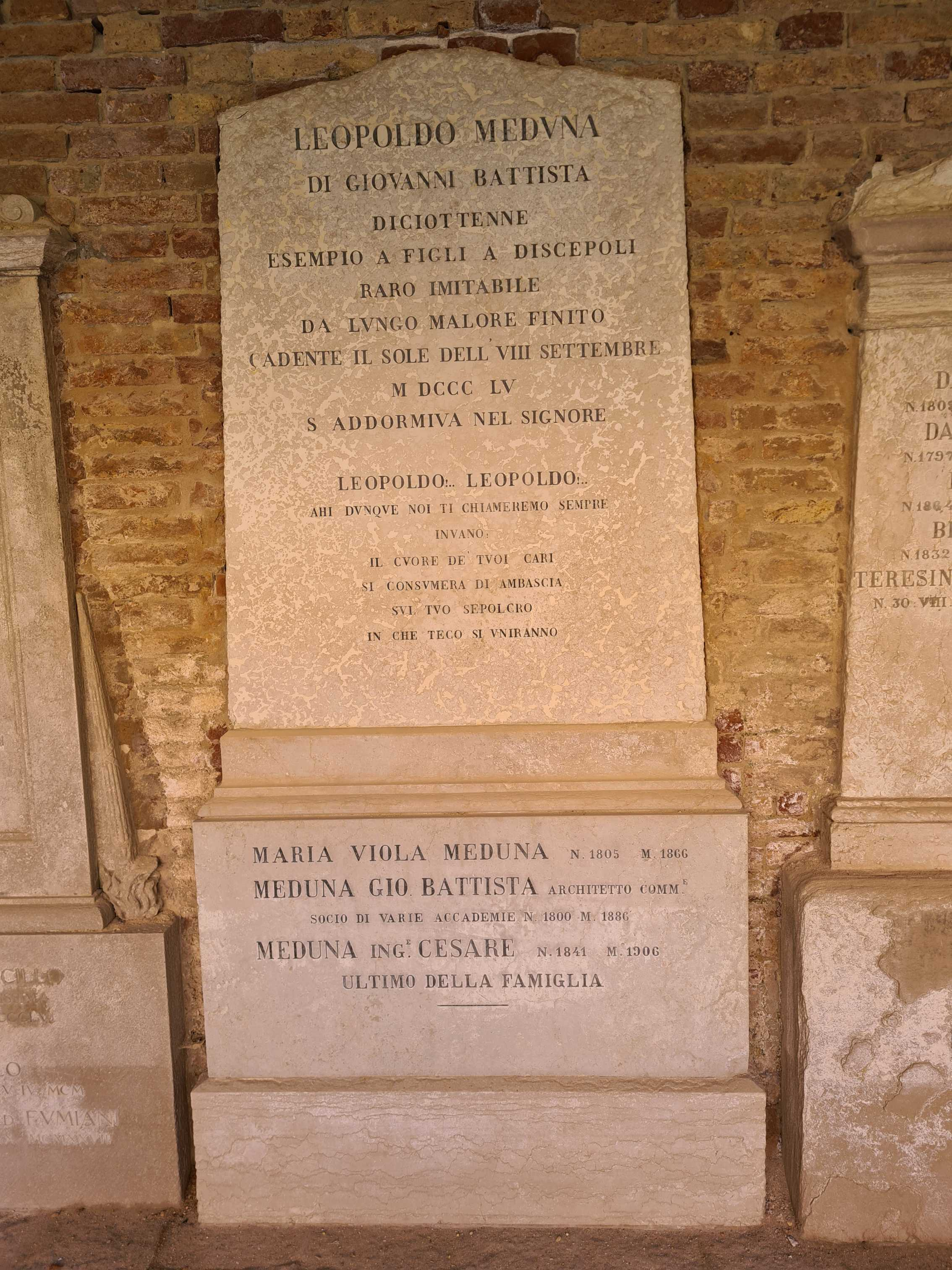
Meduna family tombstone, San Michele Cemetery, Venice

Meduna is buried at the San Michele Cemetery along with his wife Maria Viola (1805–1866) and their two sons Leopoldo (1837–1855) and Cesare Meduna (1841–1906), ending this particular lineage.

== Architectural works ==
Meduna's work focused particularly on reconstruction and restoration works during the period between the Congress of Vienna (1815) and Venice's incorporation into the Kingdom of Italy (1866), when the city developed its modern urban structure – a period marked by a crisis of identity and an architectural enthusiasm for the past, albeit with little sense of the modern discipline of conservation.

He is most notable for rebuilding the Gran Teatro La Fenice, destroyed by the fire of 1836, and the restoration of other buildings such as the Ca' d'Oro, St Mark's Basilica and the church of San Silvestro. In the hinterland he was responsible for the reconstruction of numerous places of worship.

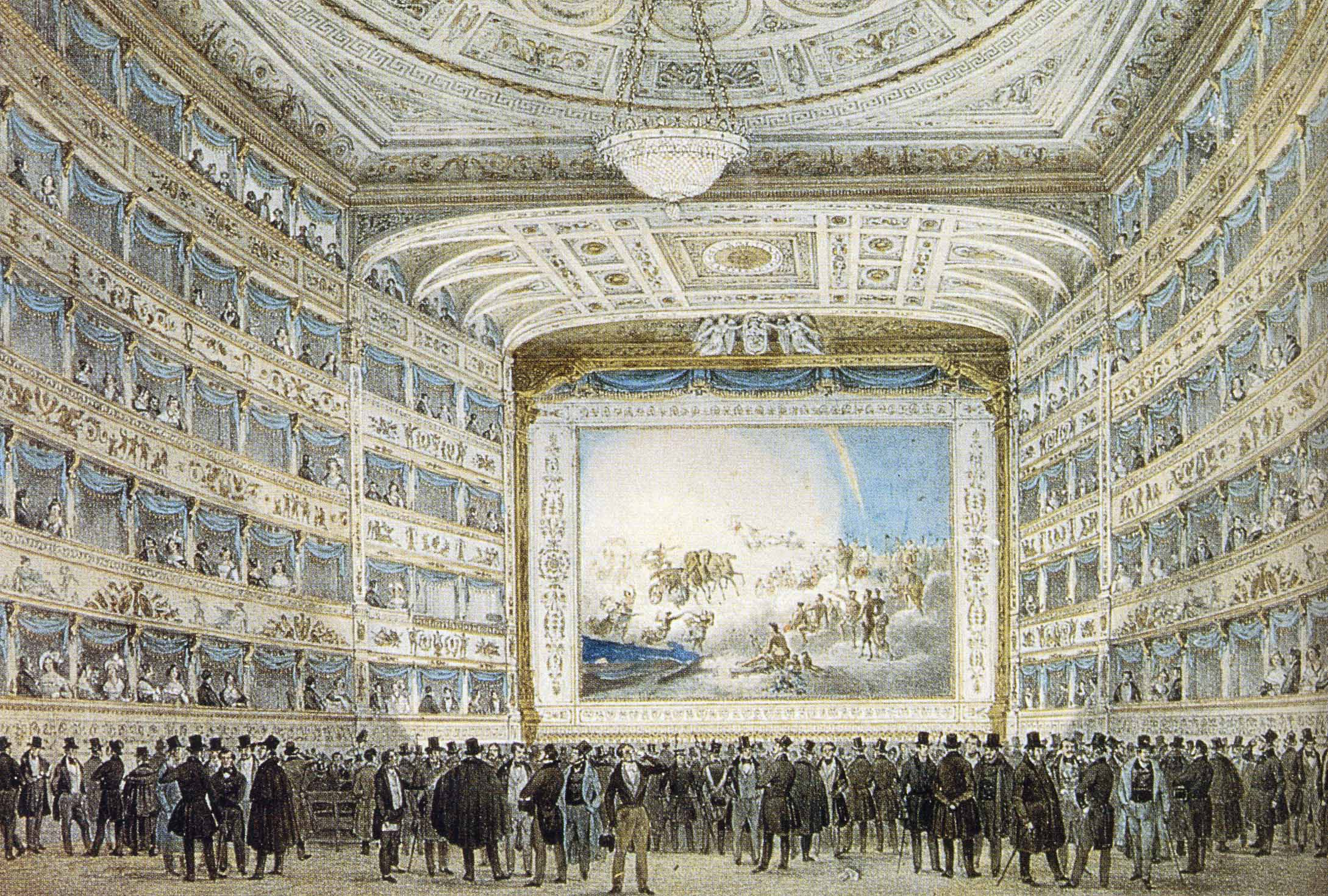
Interior of the Gran Teatro La Fenice (1837)

His works include:

- Restoration of the Palazzo Treves de Bonfili, Venice
- Restoration of the ex-convent of San Lorenzo for the Casa d'Industria (1835–1849)
- Renovation of St Mark's Basilica, Venice (1836–1878)
- Restoration and interior decoration of the Gran Teatro La Fenice, Venice (1836–1837)
- Conversion of the church of San Geremia into a workshop for the Oexle steam mills (1840–1844)
- Design of the Teatro Comunale Alighieri, Ravenna (1840–1852)
- Design of the Antonio Bajamonti theatre, Split
- Restoration of the church of San Silvestro, Venice
- Restoration at the Palazzo Vendramin Calergi, Venice (1844)
- Restoration of the Ca' d'Oro, Venice (1845–1850)
- Casa Meduna residence, Campo San Fantin, opposite the Fenice theatre and adjacent to today's Ateneo Veneto, Venice (1846)
- Restoration of the Palazzo Giovanelli in Santa Fosca, Venice (1847)
- Palazzo Revedin, Castelfranco (1852–1855)
- Reconstruction of the parish churches in Carpenedo di Mestre (1853), Fossalta di Piave and Santa Lucia di Piave (1853–1858)
- Restoration of the church of San Nicolò, Treviso
- Cathedral of San Donà di Piave (destroyed during the First World War)
- Remodeling of the façade of the parish church of Noale and the raising of its bell tower
- Construction of the Palazzo Balbi Valier Sammartini, Pieve di Soligo, Treviso (1856), for the wealthy Balbi Valier family.
- Design of Caviola and other shops, Ponte del Lovo, Venice (1859–1860)
- Restoration of the Palazzo Cavalli-Gussoni, commissioned by Henri, comte de Chambord (1860)
- Restoration of the church of San Moisè (1865)
- Detailed plans with eight great arterial streets proposed to the Commissione per lo studio di un piano di riforma delle vie e canali di Venezia, as one of the commission's nine members (1866)
- Design of the Bacino Orseolo (with Federico Berchet, 1869)
- Restoration of the church of Madonna dell'Orto (c. 1869)
- Restoration of the façade of the Scuola Grande di San Marco (as part of the Civil Hospital)

While Meduna won the praise of notable architects such as Eugène Viollet-le-Duc, he was also criticized for a heavy-handed approach to reconstructive neo-Gothic modernization rather than restorative conservation. His invasive restoration of St Mark's Basilica fuelled controversy and debate, and in the case of the early 15th-century Ca' d'Oro, his damaging transformation even led to imprisonment on charges of vandalism.

Meduna himself commented on the restoration (demolition) of his own house at San Fantin (1846) as follows:

Even though some might now feel the stirrings of warm affection for genuine things, and attempt to conserve the original parts of ancient buildings in renovating them, nonetheless a great many were destroyed, including some of considerable merit, so that hardly any trace remains of that Architecture which might almost be called national, and which was certainly quite widespread. Even in the old house at San Fantin which I demolished there were old windows in the Gothic style, and I have found many more like them. Which is what made me decide to adopt that Architecture in the construction of a façade.
