= Tommaso Meduna =

Italian engineer

Tommaso Meduna (1798–1880), knight of the Order of Saints Maurice and Lazarus, was an Italian engineer.

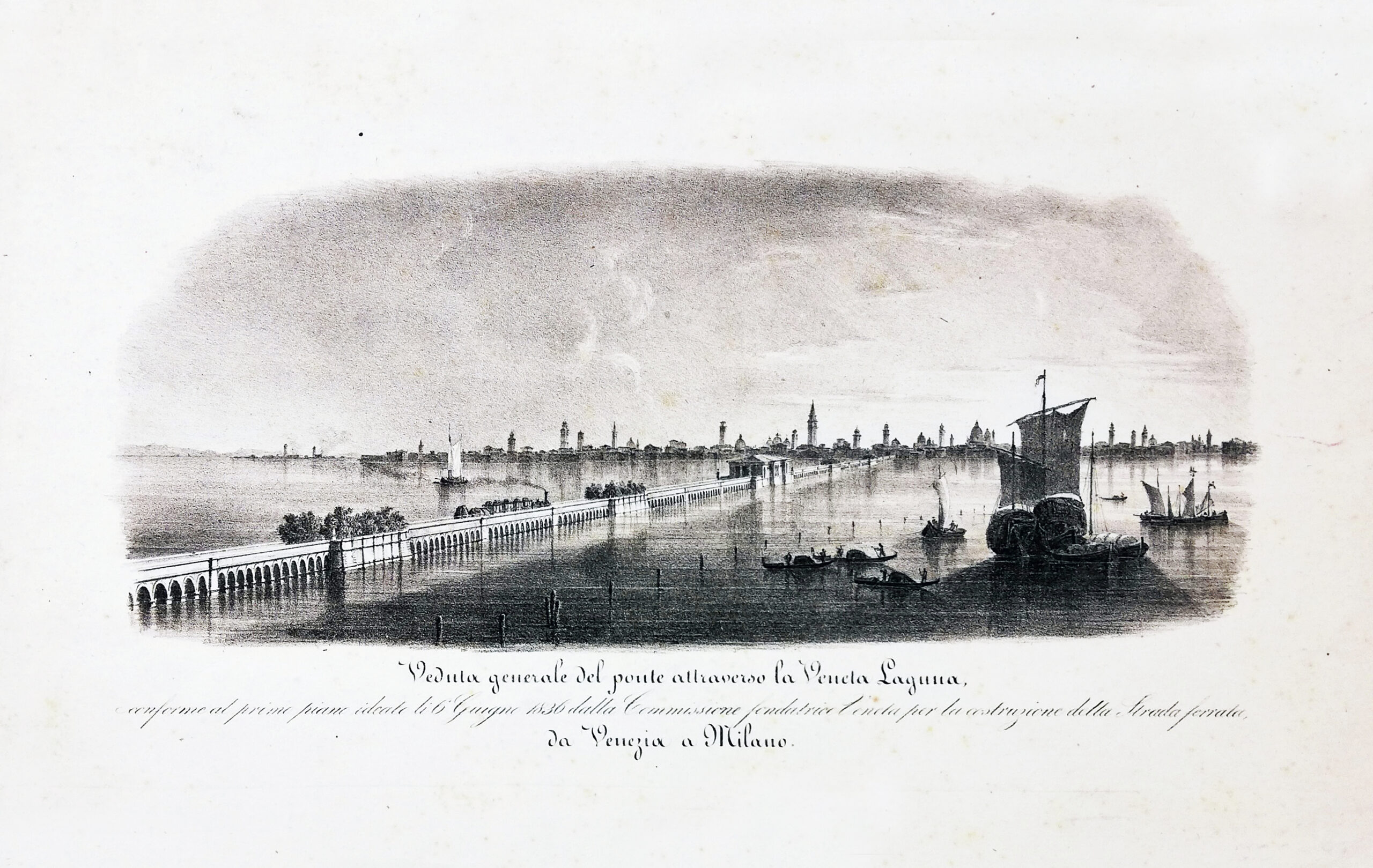
Meduna's design of the first railway bridge connecting Venice with the mainland

== Biography ==
He was the son of Venetian carpenter and window maker Andrea Meduna and a descendant of the Meduna family.

He projected and built (with modifications by Luigi Duodo and Giovanni Milani) the first railway bridge between Venice and the mainland (1836–1841). The Venice–Mestre causeway is now part of the Ponte della Libertà.

During his career, he often collaborated with his brother, architect Giovanni Battista Meduna (1800–1886), including in the reconstruction the Gran Teatro La Fenice, destroyed by the fire of 1836, and the Teatro Comunale Alighieri in Ravenna (1840–1852).

Meduna held positions as Senior Engineer 1st Class and Director of the Provincial Office of Public Buildings (at the Palazzo Loredan in Campo Santo Stefano) and Chief 1st Class in the Royal Corps of Civil Engineers.

He was the chief engineer for the Provincia during the restoration of the Fondaco dei Turchi.
