= Church of the Exaltation of the Holy Cross =

Church of the Exaltation of the Holy Cross may refer to:

== Belarus ==
- Church of the Exaltation of the Holy Cross, Vileyka

== Croatia ==
- Church of the Exaltation of the Holy Cross, Zagreb

== Czech Republic ==
- Church of the Exaltation of the Holy Cross, Prostějov

== Poland ==
- Church of the Exaltation of the Holy Cross, Dobratycze
- Church of the Exaltation of the Holy Cross, Goworowo
- Church of the Exaltation of the Holy Cross, Horostyta
- Exaltation of the Holy Cross Church in Jelenia Góra
- Orthodox Church of the Exaltation of the Holy Cross, Kraków
- Church of the Exaltation of the Holy Cross, Leśno
- Church of the Exaltation of the Holy Cross, Narew

== Romania ==
- Church of the Holy Cross, Pătrăuți

== Russia ==
- Church of the Exaltation of the Holy Cross, Kazan
- Church of the Exaltation of the Holy Cross, Tambov

== Slovakia ==
- Cathedral of the Exaltation of the Holy Cross, Bratislava
- Basilica of the Exaltation of the Holy Cross, Kežmarok

== Switzerland ==
- Russian Church, Geneva

== Ukraine ==
- Church of the Exaltation of Holy Cross, Kopychyntsi
- Exaltation of the Holy Cross church, Monastyrok, Ternopil Oblast
- Church of the Exaltation of the Cross, Ternopil
- Exaltation of the Holy Cross Church, Shvaikivtsi
- Greek Catholic Cathedral, Uzhhorod
- Exaltation of the Holy Cross church, Zazdrist

== See also ==
- Elevation of Holy Cross Church, South Naknek, Alaska, United States
- Parish of the Exaltation of the Holy Cross Prostějov, Czech Republic
- Holy Cross Exaltation Monastery, Kizlyar, Russia
- Holy Cross Exaltation Monastery, Poltava, Ukraine
- Holy Cross Church (disambiguation)
