= Holy Cross Church =

Holy Cross Church, or variants thereof, may refer to:

== Australia ==
- Cathedral of the Holy Cross, Geraldton, Western Australia, the Cathedral church of the Anglican Diocese of North West Australia

== Canada ==
- Church of the Holy Cross (Skatin). a first nations church in Skookumchuck Hot Springs, British Columbia
- Holy Cross Church, Wikwemikong, Ontario

== China ==
- Holy Cross Church, Wanzhou
- Holy Cross Church, Wuxi

== Croatia ==
- Church of the Holy Cross, Nin, a Croatian Pre-Romanesque Catholic church originating from the 9th century in Nin
- Sisak, Church of Holy Cross

== Cyprus ==
- Church of the Holy Cross, Nicosia

== Denmark ==
- Holy Cross Church, Copenhagen

== Finland ==
- Holy Cross Church, Hattula, in Hattula, is the oldest church in the former Tavastia (Häme) province
- Holy Cross Church, Iisalmi, in Iisalmi
- Holy Cross Church, Tampere, a religious building affiliated with the Catholic Church in the city of Tampere
- Church of the Holy Cross, Rauma, a medieval fieldstone church in Rauma, in the UNESCO World Heritage Site of Old Rauma

== France ==
- Église de l′Invention de la Sainte-Croix in Kaysersberg, Haut-Rhin

== Germany ==
- Catholic Holy Cross Church, Augsburg
- Evangelical Holy Cross Church, Augsburg
- Neuwerkskirche, Erfurt, dedicated to the Holy Cross
- Holy Cross Church, Frankfurt-Bornheim, a Roman Catholic church in the Bornheim district of Frankfurt am Main
- Kreuzkirche, Hanover
- Holy Cross Church, Lehre, currently a Lutheran church
- Holy Cross Church, Munich, the oldest preserved church in the city
- Holy Cross Church (Neuenwalde Convent), the church of the Neuenwalde Convent
- Abbey of the Holy Cross, Rostock, founded in the 13th century by Cistercian nuns

== India ==
- Holy Cross Shrine Mapranam, Kerala
- Holy Cross Church, Silchar, former cathedral
- Holy Cross Church, Kurla, Mumbai Maharashtra

== Lithuania ==
- Church of the Holy Cross, Vilnius

== Norway ==
- Holy Cross Church, Bergen, a church of the Church of Norway in the city centre of Bergen

== Poland ==
- Holy Cross Church, Warsaw, a Roman Catholic house of worship in Warsaw,. Located on Krakowskie Przedmieście opposite the main Warsaw University campus, it is one of the most notable Baroque churches in Poland's capital
- Collegiate Church of the Holy Cross and St. Bartholomew in Wrocław

== Portugal ==
- Holy Cross Church, Braga (Igreja de Santa Cruz), a Portuguese 17th century church in Braga, dedicated to the Holy Cross

== Russia ==
- Holy Cross Church, Nakhichevan on Don, an 18th-century Armenian church in Nor Nakhichevan. It is the oldest surviving monument in the borders of Rostov-on-Don

== Slovakia ==
- Holy Cross Church, Banská Bystrica

== Sri Lanka ==
- Holy Cross Church, Gampaha, in Western Province

== Syria ==
- Holy Cross Church (Aleppo), an Armenian Catholic Church in the Ouroubeh quarter (near Aziziyeh) of Aleppo

== Turkey ==
- Armenian Cathedral of the Holy Cross, on Akdamar Island

== Ukraine ==
- Surb Khach Monastery, a medieval Monastery of the Holy Cross in Crimea
- The Exaltation of the Holy Cross Church, an Orthodox church of the guilds of Tanners and Crockers in Kyiv

== United Kingdom ==
=== England ===
- Holy Cross Church, Binstead, Isle of Wight
- Holy Cross Church, Bristol
- Holy Cross Church, Burley, Rutland
- Holy Cross Church, Bury, Cambridgeshire
- Church of the Holy Cross, Crediton, Devon
- Holy Cross Church, Leicester
- Holy Cross Church, Lincoln
- Church of the Holy Cross, Pershore, Worcestershire
- Holy Cross Church, St Pancras, London
- Holy Cross Church, Woodchurch, Wirral
- Holy Cross Church (Woodingdean), Woodingdean, Brighton and Hove

=== Wales ===
- Church of the Holy Cross, Mwnt, Ceredigion
- Church of the Holy Cross, Cowbridge, Vale of Glamorgan

== United States ==
=== California ===
- Holy Cross Church (San Jose, California), San Jose

=== Illinois ===
- Eastside Community Center, Batavia, formerly Holy Cross Church
- Holy Cross Church (Chicago)

=== Kentucky ===
- Holy Cross Church and School Complex-Latonia, Covington
- Holy Cross Church (Marion County, Kentucky)
- Holy Cross Catholic Church (Louisville, Kentucky), listed on the NRHP in the West End of Louisville, Kentucky

=== Maine ===
- Holy Cross Church, Lewiston

=== Maryland ===
- Holy Cross Roman Catholic Church (Baltimore, Maryland)

=== Massachusetts ===
- Holy Cross Church, Boston (former Holy Cross Cathedral), on Franklin Street in Boston,. In 1808 the church became the Cathedral of the Holy Cross

=== Minnesota ===
- Church of the Holy Cross-Episcopal, Dundas, listed on the NRHP in Rice County, Minnesota

=== Missouri ===
- Holy Cross Parish District, St. Louis, listed on the NRHP in St. Louis, Missouri

=== New York ===
- Holy Cross Church (Bronx), City, a Roman Catholic church in Soundview
- Holy Cross Church (Manhattan), a Roman Catholic in the Hell's Kitchen neighborhood of New York City
- Church of the Holy Cross (Troy, New York)
- Memorial Church of the Holy Cross, Utica

=== Ohio ===
- Holy Cross Church, Rectory and School, Columbus
- Holy Cross Lithuanian Roman Catholic Church, Dayton

=== Rhode Island ===
- Church of the Holy Cross (Middletown, Rhode Island), in Middletown, is a parish church of the Episcopal Diocese of Rhode Island of The Episcopal Church

=== South Carolina ===
- Church of the Holy Cross (Stateburg, South Carolina), also known as Holy Cross Episcopal Church

=== Washington ===
- Holy Cross Polish National Catholic Church, Pe Ell

=== Wisconsin ===
- Holy Cross Church and Convent, Green Bay
- Holy Cross Church (Kaukauna, Wisconsin)

== See also ==
- Cathedral of the Holy Cross (disambiguation)
- Church of the Exaltation of the Holy Cross (disambiguation)
- Elevation of Holy Cross Church, South Naknek, Alaska
- Holy Cross Abbey (Cañon City, Colorado)
- Chapel of the Holy Cross (Holderness, New Hampshire)
- Holy Cross Monastery (West Park, New York)
- Holy Cross Monastery and Chapel, Cincinnati, Ohio
- St Cross Church (disambiguation)
