= Jakub Melissaeus Krtský =

Utraquist Hussite priest (1554–1599)

Jakub Melissaeus Krtský VDM (also known as Jakub Meduna Krtský; 1554 – 20 October 1599) was an Utraquist Hussite teacher and priest in Bohemia.

== Biography ==
Jakub Melissaeus Krtský was born in 1554 in Krty. He was the brother of Václav Melissaeus Krtský (1540–1578) and uncle of Václav Melissaeus Lounský (c. 1573–1631).

He went to school in Louny and studied at Prague's Charles University in 1566. In the fall of 1578, he worked at a school in Jindřichův Hradec. In the first half of the 1580s, he was administrator of the school Pelhřimov.

He then switched to the clerical path and was ordained to priesthood in Zerbst, in today's Saxony-Anhalt – a centre of Calvinism following the Reformation. He served as pastor at the Parish of the Exaltation of the Holy Cross in Prostějov during the church's non-Catholic period (1522–1622, which also earned him the name of Iacobus de Prostiegowa), and as parish priest in Zásmuky until 1586. On 6 March 1586, on the advice of archdeacon Sixtus Candius and on the certificate that he was a learned and peaceful man, he was offered the administration of St. Barbara's Church in Kutná Hora, which he carried out until 1588. He then became archdeacon of the University School (archdeaconry near the Church of Saint James the Elder) in Kutná Hora from 1593 until his death in 1599.

The Genethliaca et anagrammatismi ab amicis concinnati in honorem (Prague 1599) contains his dirges about "excellent men" (such as Jan Simonides Montanus) as well as poems composed by friends celebrating his memory. In 1596 published a translation of Psalms of Saint David adapted to spiritual songs, as well as a triple sermon he gave before, during, and after the burial of Kutná Hora flood victims in 1598.

He was a close acquaintance of lexicographer Daniel Adam of Veleslavín and contributed to his dictionary with many local names.

He died on 20 October 1599 as a victim of the plague and was buried at St. Barbara's Church in Kutná Hora.
