= Václav Melissaeus Krtský =

Utraquist Hussite priest (1540–1578)

Václav Melissaeus Krtský (also known as Václav Meduna Krtský; 1540 – 26 October 1578) was an Utraquist Hussite priest in Bohemia.

== Biography ==
Václav Melissaeus Krtský was born in 1540 in Krty. He was the brother of Jakub Melissaeus Krtský (1554–1599) and father of Václav Melissaeus Lounský (c. 1573–1631).

He was ordained to priesthood in 1560, chaplain in Žatec, dean in Louny in 1568, and later spiritual administrator in Český Dub.

He composed spiritual songs, which are included in the Lomnický Hymnal.

In 1575, he was a member of the commission that compiled the Confessio Bohemica.

His last will, dictated 15 October 1578 to municipal scribe Jan Thabořský, in the presence of Burgomaster Jan Jaroš and warden Jan Moravec, was confirmed by the Český Dub city council on 26 November 1578. In it, he bequeathed all his property to his wife Anna, mother of their children, and any inheritance and shares of the farm of his father (still alive in 1578) to his "relatives and blood friends".

He died on 26 October 1578 in Český Dub.
