= August Klein =

German architect

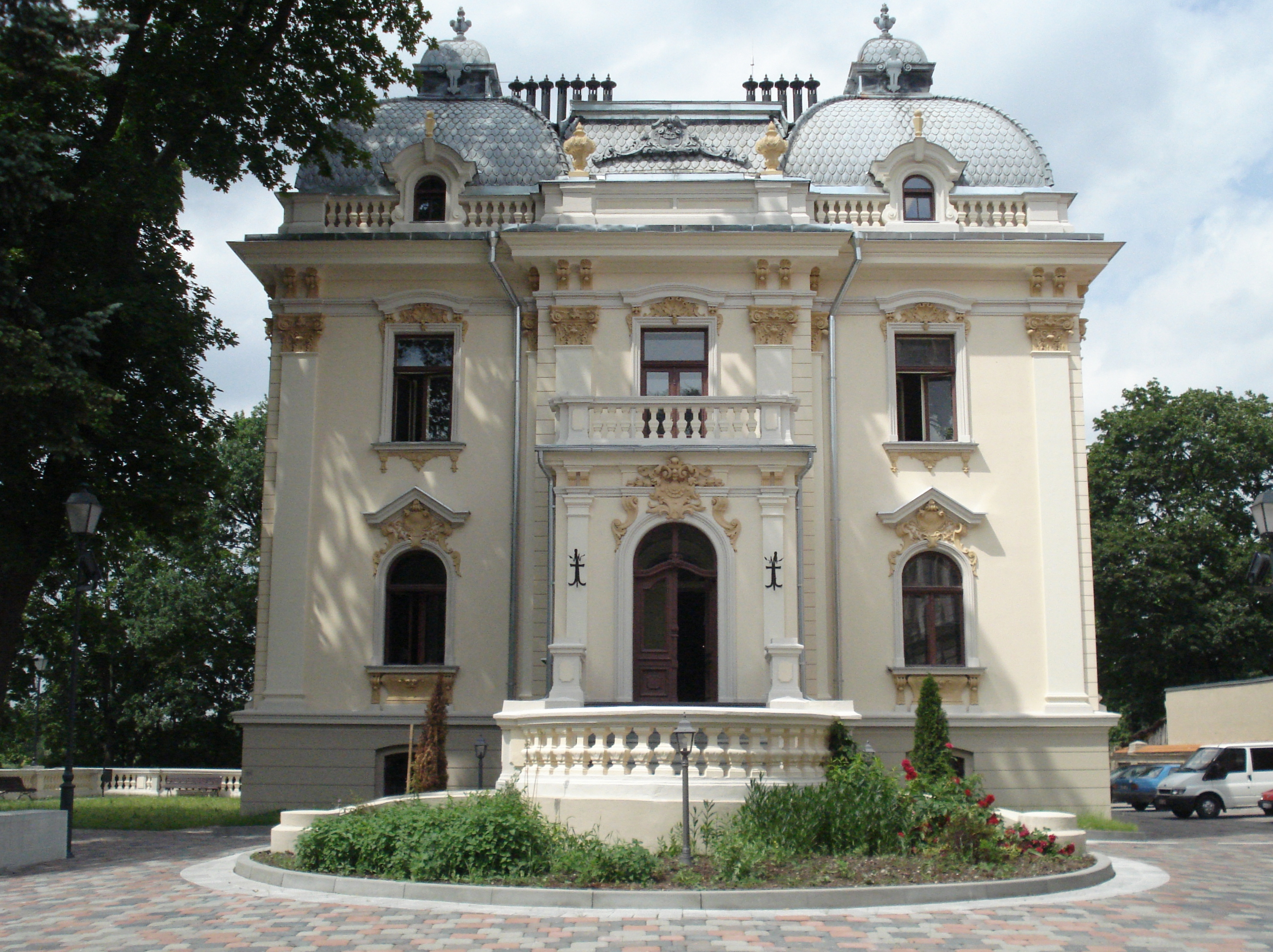
Vileišis Palace

August Klein (1870–1913) was an architect of German origins, born in Poland, who worked in Vilnius.

August Klein was born in the Łowicz county, of the Warsaw Governorate of Congress Poland, in 1870. From 1891 to 1896 studied in Saint Petersburg at the Institute of Civil Engineers. In Vilnius, together with Władysław Stypułkowski, he founded the “Construction Office” and a materials warehouse in 1912. Both became associated with the philanthropist Józef Montwiłł. Klein lectured at the School of Technical Drawing and Painting for Craftsmen, established by Montwiłł and operating in Montwiłł's house. Together with Władysław Stypułkowski, they took part in designing houses for the Montwiłł colony being developed in Rossa, a district of spacious single-family homes.

He gained a reputation as a builder of elegant villas and holiday homes; one of the most well-known is the villa of Professor General Aleksander Mushnikov. Among his prominent works are Vileišis Palace, completed in 1906, and Church of the Exaltation of the Holy Cross in Vileyka.

August Klein died at the age of 43.

== Bibliography ==
- Balbus, Tomasz (2023). "Projektant domów, willi i rezydencji" (PDF). Kurier Wileński (in Polish). 45: 38–42.
