= St Cross Church =

St Cross Church may refer to:

- St Cross Church, Appleton Thorn
- St Cross Church, Knutsford
- St Cross Church, Middleton
- St Cross Church, Oxford

== See also ==
- St Cross (disambiguation)
- Holy Cross Church (disambiguation)
