= Václav Melissaeus Lounský =

Utraquist Hussite teacher and priest (c. 1573–1631)

Václav Melissaeus Lounský (also known as Václav Meduna Lounský; c. 1573 – 4 March 1631) was an Utraquist Hussite teacher and priest in Bohemia.

== Biography ==
Václav Melissaeus Lounský was born around 1573 in Louny. He was the son of Václav Melissaeus Krtský (1540–1578) and nephew of Jakub Melissaeus Krtský (1554–1599).

After his father's death, he lived with his guardian and uncle Jakub in Pelhřimov and Kutná Hora in the 1580s. He was later educated at Latin schools in Louny (until 1592) and Chrudim.

On 21 September 1593, his sister married the writer Václav Stříbrský, son of the late Peter.

From 1594, he studied at Prague's Utraquist University (at the Collegium sanctissimae virginis Mariae domus nationis Bohemicae), today's Charles University, where he received a bachelor's degree on 12 July 1595.

Thanks to the recommendation of his uncle Jakub, he worked for about a year at the archdeaconry school in Kutná Hora after completing his bachelor's degree. From there, he transferred to the town school in Louny, where he worked as a teacher for four and a half years from 1596 until 1599 (in 1598 he was investigated together with others for an offensive song about the municipal administration).

In 1600, he became the preceptor of Jiří, Adam the younger and Karel, sons of Karel Hruška from Březno, as well as Adam the elder, son of Bernard Hruška from Březno. Together with Karel Chotek von Chockov (who later joined the Bohemian Revolt and the Saxon invasion of Bohemia in 1631) and famulus Martin Reissig from Bitozeves, they enrolled at the academy in Altdorf, Nuremberg, on 27 December 1600.

After returning to Bohemia, he worked again at the archdeaconry school in Kutná Hora from March 1603 until 1605, this time as its rector. On 17 August 1604, he obtained his master's degree at Prague's Utraquist University.

Having been ordained to priesthood in Zerbst, in today's Saxony-Anhalt – a centre of Calvinism following the Reformation – on 27 May 1605, he was appointed chaplain at St. Barbara's Church in Kutná Hora.

On 24 January 1606, he married at St. Barbara Kateřina from Most, who was a servant to Řehor Zhorský Kladrubský, a burgher and writer of the town of Louny.

Sometime after that he was a church administrator in Mladá Vožica, and since 16 September 1613 dean in Čáslav.

Before the Battle of White Mountain in 1620, he became the ecclesiastical administrator of the rectory in Hrušovany, Polepy, on the estate of Ladislav Žejdlic of Šenfeld (Seydlitz von Schönfeld).

In 1622–1623, as part of the Counter-Reformation, he was denounced and expelled by Jesuits, which in 1624 forced him to go into exile in Pirna, Saxony, with his wife and four children (one daughter). In Pirna, on 24 February 1627, his wife Kateřina was godmother to Bohuslav, the son of Václav Nisselius of Strakonice.

One of many religious refugees in Saxony, he was living off his savings ("zehret umb sein Geldt" / "gnaws on his money"). Of the 4,000 people living in Pirna at that time, about 2,000 were Bohemians in exile. On 22 February 1628, along with many others during that time, he was accused of Calvinism by the local Protestant clergy, because he did not attend the local services as he did not speak German. As a result, he was denied burial at the Lutheran cemetery when he died on 4 March 1631 at the age of 58.

He is the author of several small Latin compositions, some writings were also dedicated to him.
