= Holy Cross Church, Braga =

Coordinates: 41.5494°N 8.4241°W

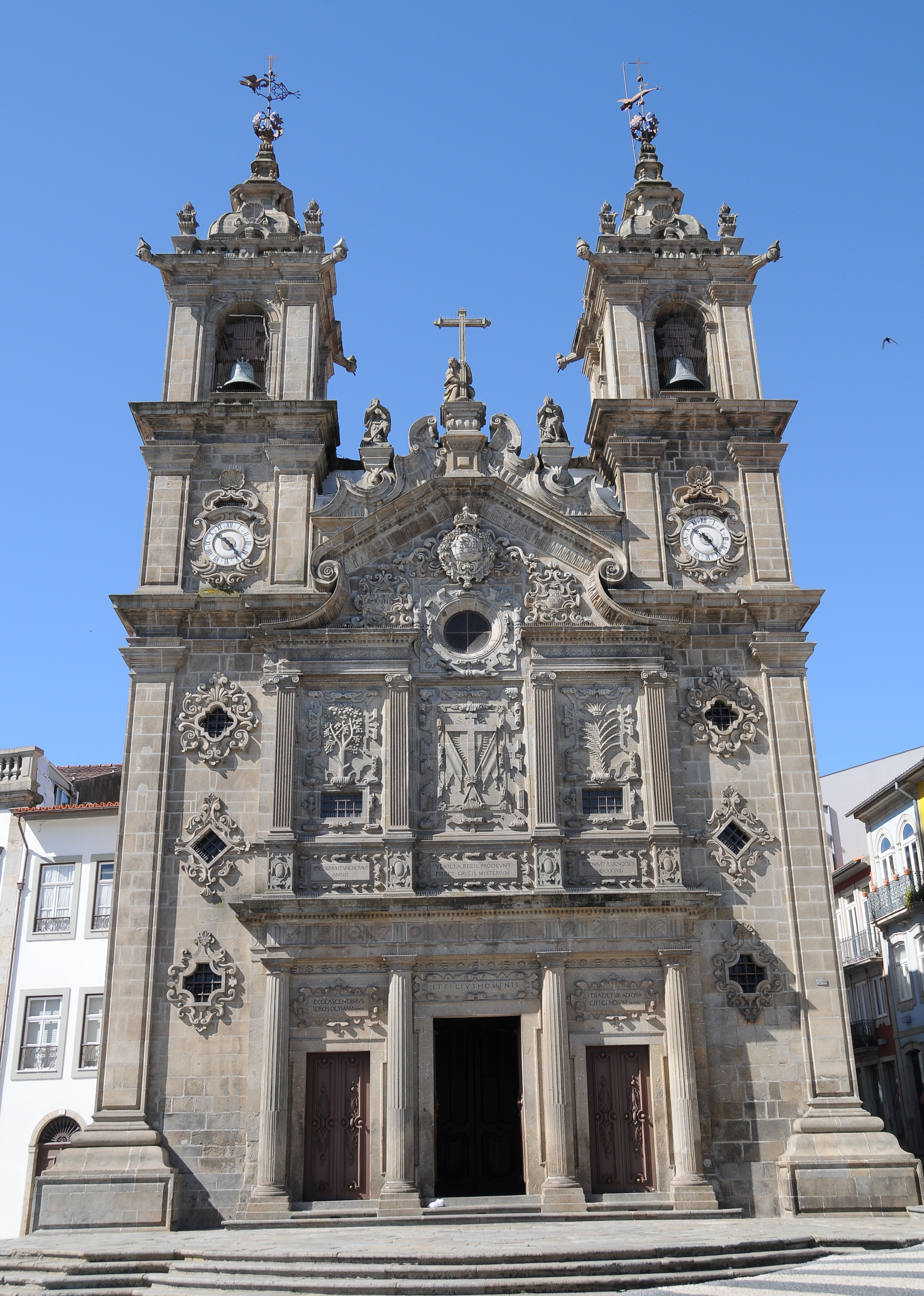
Holy Cross Church

The Holy Cross Church in Portuguese, Igreja de Santa Cruz is a Portuguese 17th century church in Braga, Portugal, dedicated to the Holy Cross.

The Church of the Five Wounds in San Jose, California was modeled after the Holy Cross Church in Braga.

== See also ==
- Holy Cross Church (disambiguation)
