= Memorial Church of the Holy Cross =

Historic church in New York, United States

- U.S. National Register of Historic Places
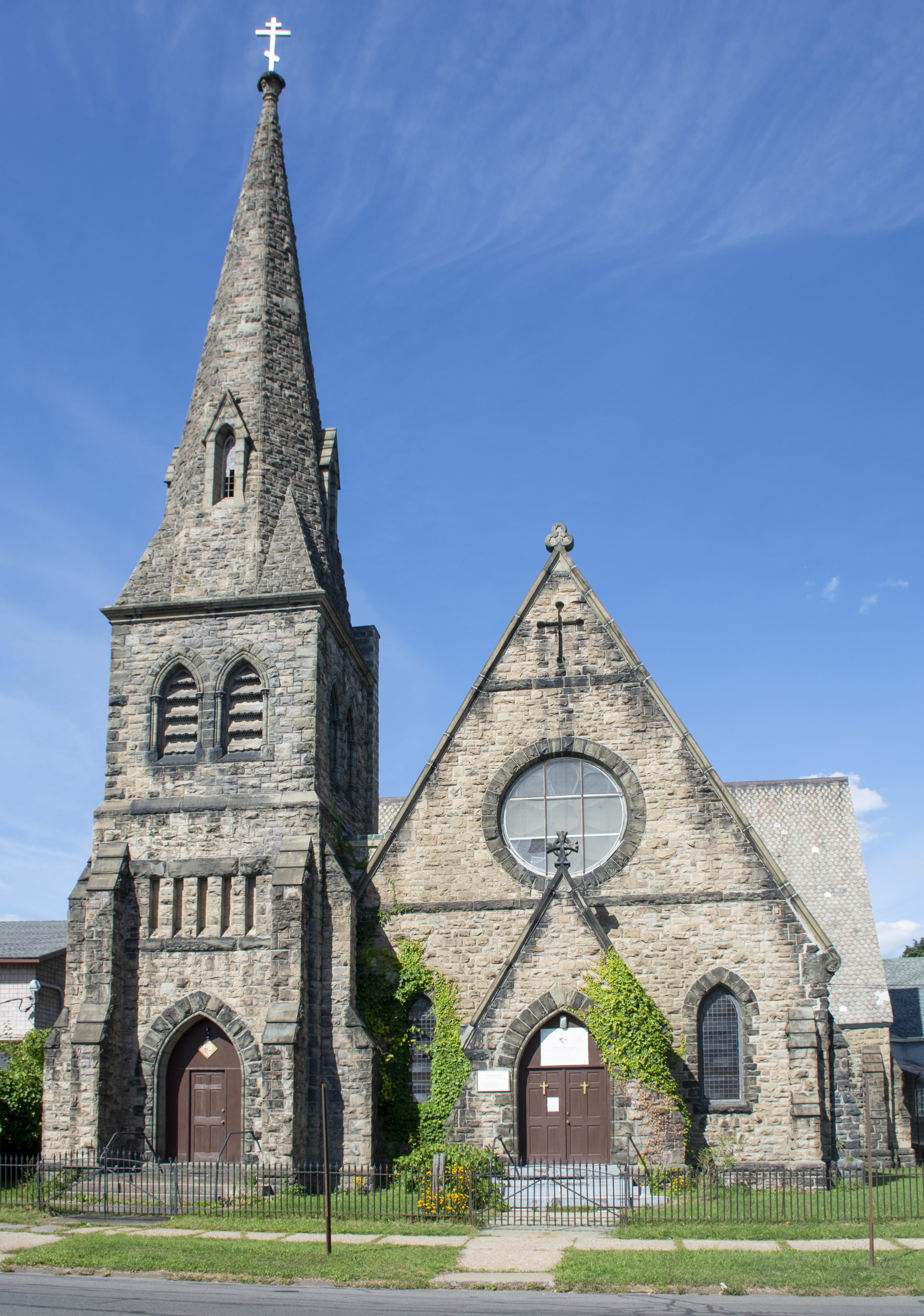

- Location within New York Location within the United States
- Location: 841 Bleecker St. Utica, New York
- Coordinates: 43°5′50″N 75°12′49″W
- Area: less than one acre
- Built: 1891
- Architect: Constable, James, Jr.
- Architectural style: Gothic
- NRHP reference No.: 00000823
- Added to NRHP: July 20, 2000

Memorial Church of the Holy Cross is a historic Episcopal church at 841 Bleecker Street in Utica, Oneida County, New York. It was built in 1891 and is a cruciform plan structure with a rectangular nave that intersects two flanking transepts at the apse. It is in the High Victorian Gothic style. It is currently occupied by a Ukrainian Orthodox congregation.

It was listed on the National Register of Historic Places in 2000.
