= Church of the Exaltation of the Holy Cross, Zagreb =

Church of the Exaltation of the Holy Cross (Croatian: Crkva Uzvišenja Svetog Križa)
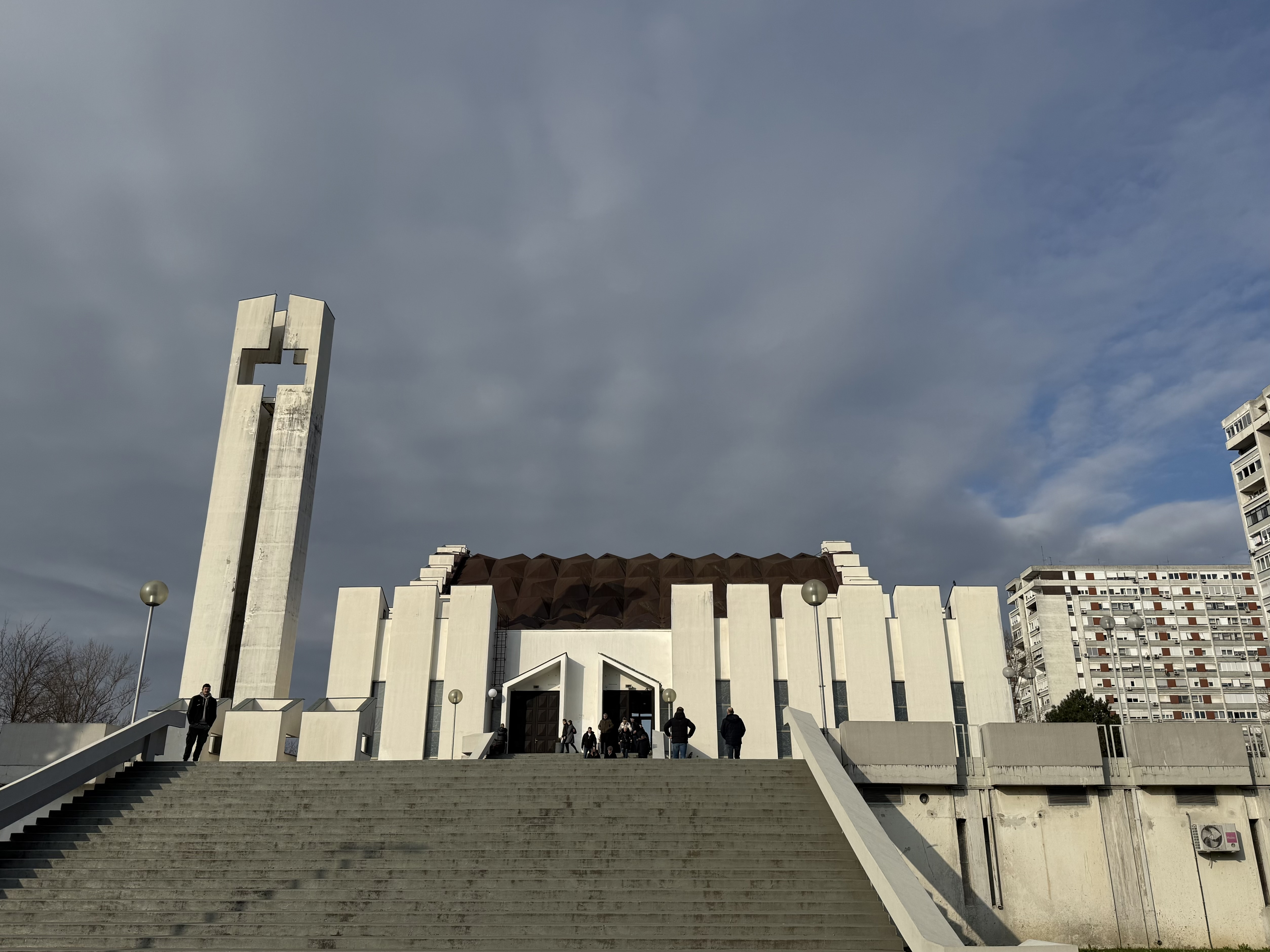
- View of the church
- Church of the Exaltation of the Holy Cross (Croatian: Crkva Uzvišenja Svetog Križa)
- 45°46′19″N 15°58′38″E
- Location: Zagreb
- Country: Croatia
- Denomination: Roman Catholic

Architecture
- Functional status: Active
- Architect(s): Emil Seršić, Matija Salaj, Josip Horvat
- Style: functionalism
- Groundbreaking: 1971
- Completed: 1982

Church of the Exaltation of the Holy Cross, Zagreb (Croatian: Crkva Uzvišenja Svetog Križa u Zagrebu) is a Catholic parish church located in the neighbourhood Siget of Zagreb, Croatia.

Next to the parish church, a monastery with a net area of 800 m^{2} and a 33 m high bell tower were built.

== History ==
This church is the first newer church in Novi Zagreb in the Siget neighbourhood, built from 1971 to 1982. It was consecrated in 1983 by the Archbishop of Zagreb, Franjo Kuharić.

The first residential buildings in Novi Zagreb were built in the early 1960s, but that part of the city had no religious buildings except for a small (older) church in Remetinec. In 1964, the Franciscans, or rather their provincial D. Damjanović, requested land for a church in Novi Zagreb from the city administration in exchange for nationalised land on Savska cesta (the Zagrepčanka skyscraper). After they managed to obtain the land, in 1966 they submitted a request to build a church on that land, and the City of Zagreb issued a building permit on 7 May 1970. Based on this, a contract was concluded on 15 August with the construction company "Industrogradnja" and construction of the church began according to the design of architects Emil Seršić and Matija Salaj. The Franciscan provincial at the time, Stanko Banić, was involved in the construction of the church. He had a lot of problems seeking credit, but he succeeded with help from abroad.

The work was temporarily suspended in 1977, and due to fears that the project would not be completed, the design of the complicated roof was changed, without the consent of architects Seršić and Salaj. A second design for the roof was made by architect Josip Horvat. The church was completed on 17 August 1982, and was officially opened on 22 August with a mass led by the Archbishop of Zagreb, Franjo Kuharić.

Franciscan Smiljan Dragan Kožul worked in the Church of the Exaltation of the Holy Cross for a long time.

== Architecture ==
The Church of the Exaltation of the Holy Cross in Siget is to this day one of the most successful modern architectural sacral buildings in Croatia. It is a harmonious combination of three objects and their volumes; the church, the monastery and the bell tower. The rhythmic composition of 74 concrete verticals - roof supports, into which the facade is divided. The roof is divided into 142 steel pyramidal projections.

The entrance to the sanctuary is on the first floor, which is reached by a monumental staircase. The ground floor contains ancillary facilities. The sacred atmosphere in the interior of the church is emphasised by reminiscences of Gothic verticalism and the play of light entering through many stained glass windows. The interior space is organised in the spirit of post-conciliar liturgy; non-authoritative, with an indicated but not emphasised direction. The conciliar emphasis on the participation of the faithful in the ritual implied the increasingly frequent appearance of a central space of the sanctuary in Croatia and the world. This was a departure from the previous longitudinal type that arose from the Tridentine liturgy. The Church of the Exaltation of the Holy Cross is the first church of the central typology built in the 20th century in Zagreb.

The interior of the church was designed by architect Petar Ružević. In 1988, the Split painter Josip Botteri Dini created stained glass windows inspired by the verses of St. Francis of Assisi's "Song of the Creatures". In the middle of the altar area is an eight-meter-high cross, the work of Neda Grdinić. The church has a capacity for 2,000 people.

== Gallery ==
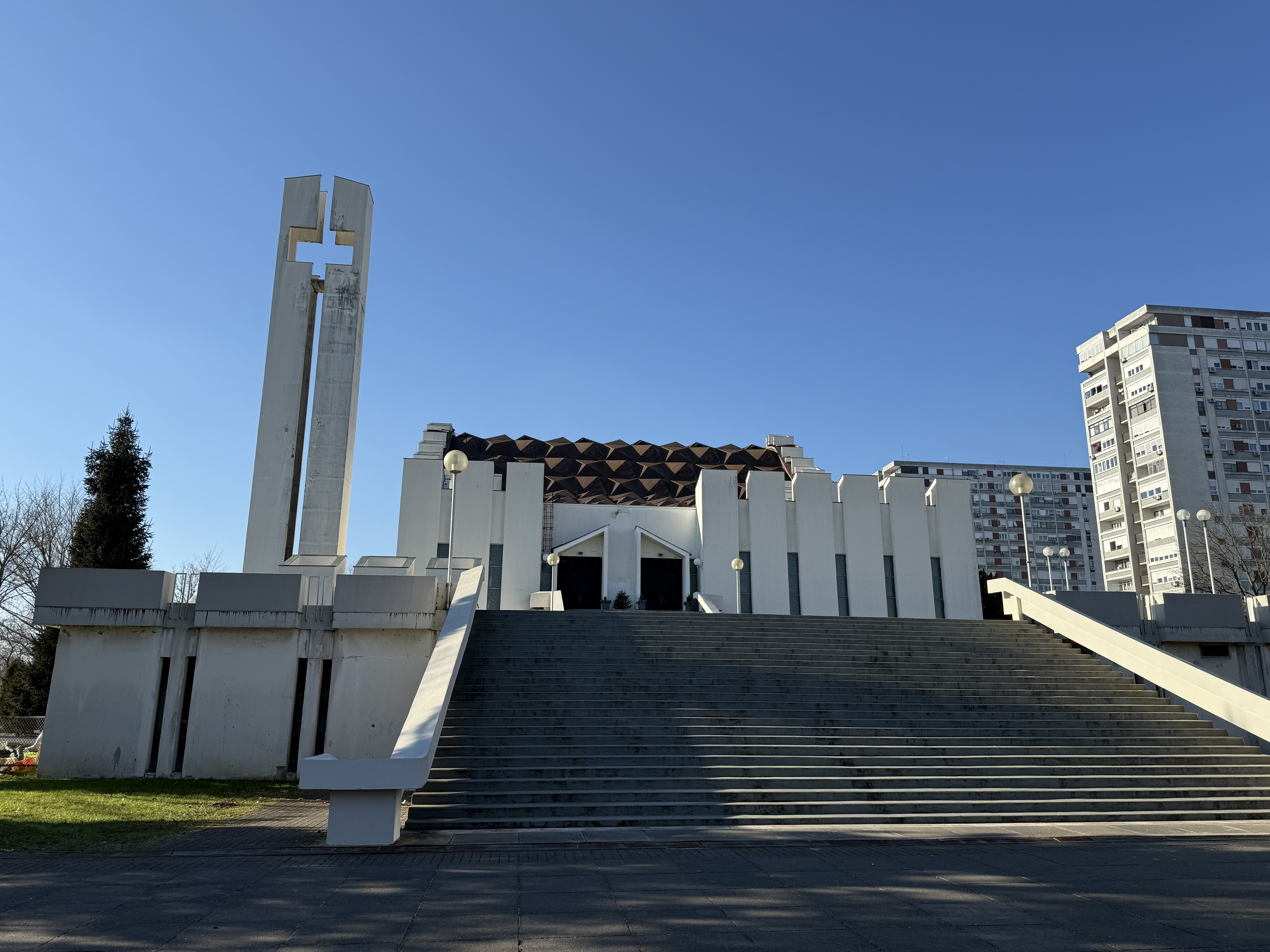
Church entrance

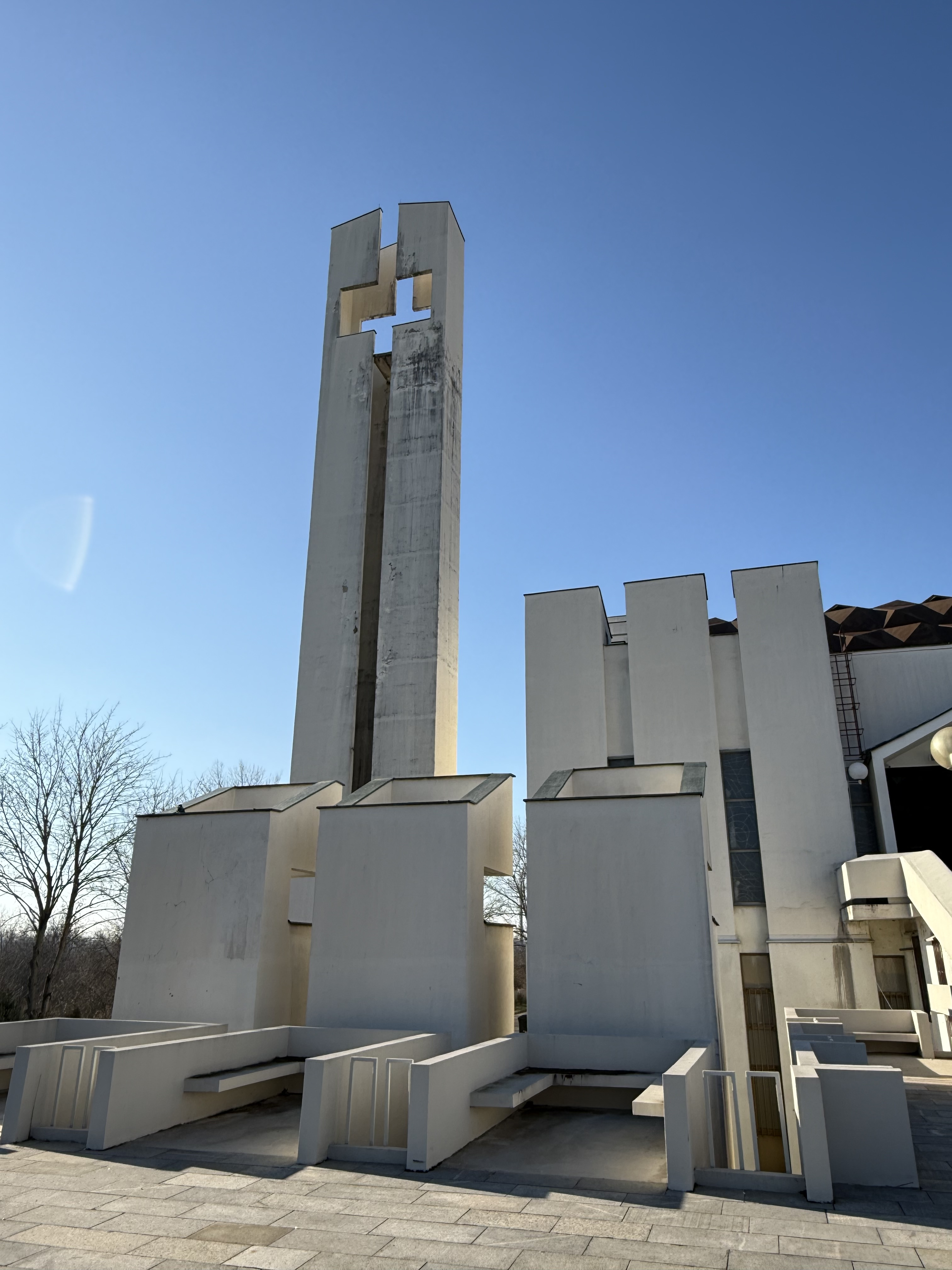
Belfry

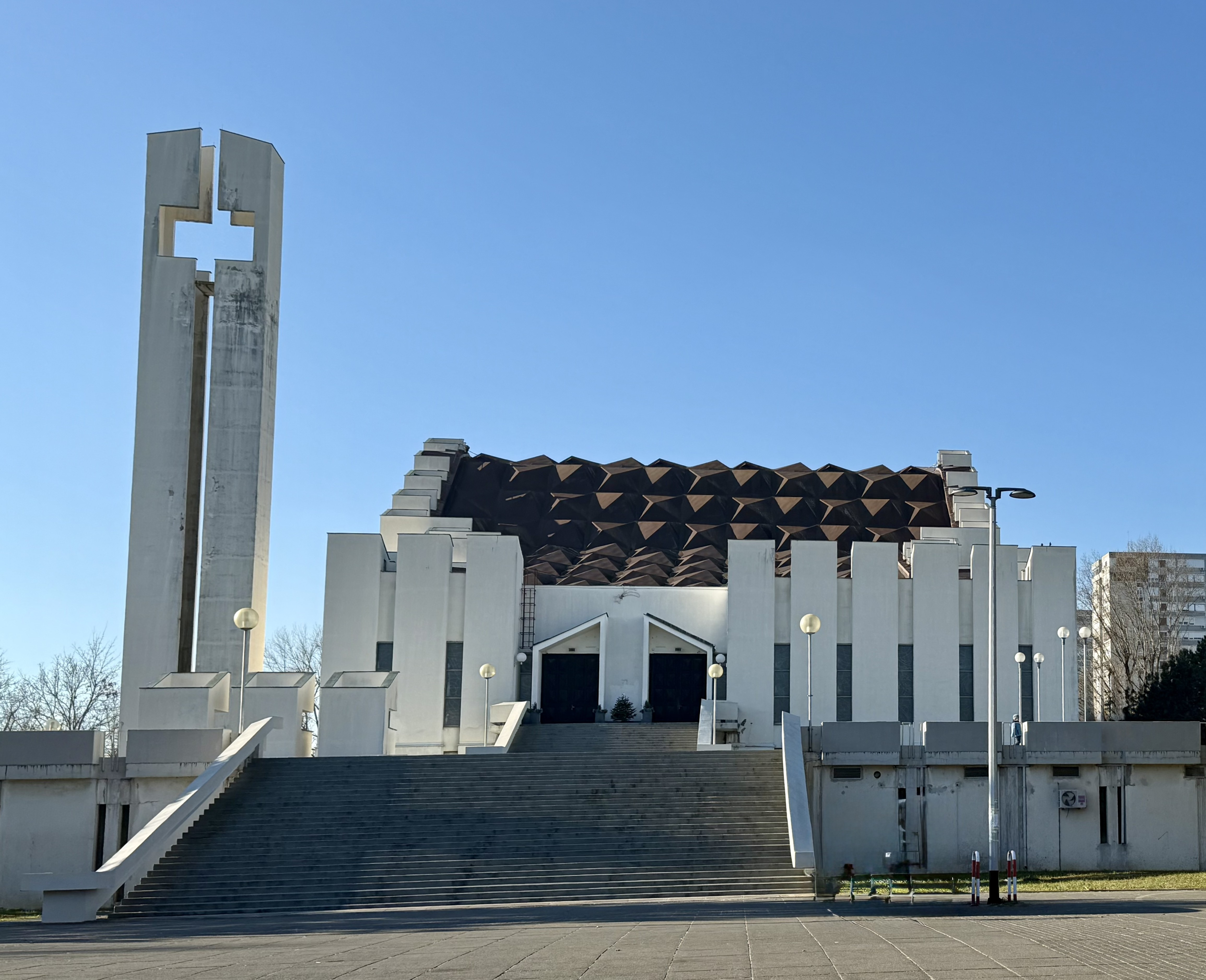
View of the church

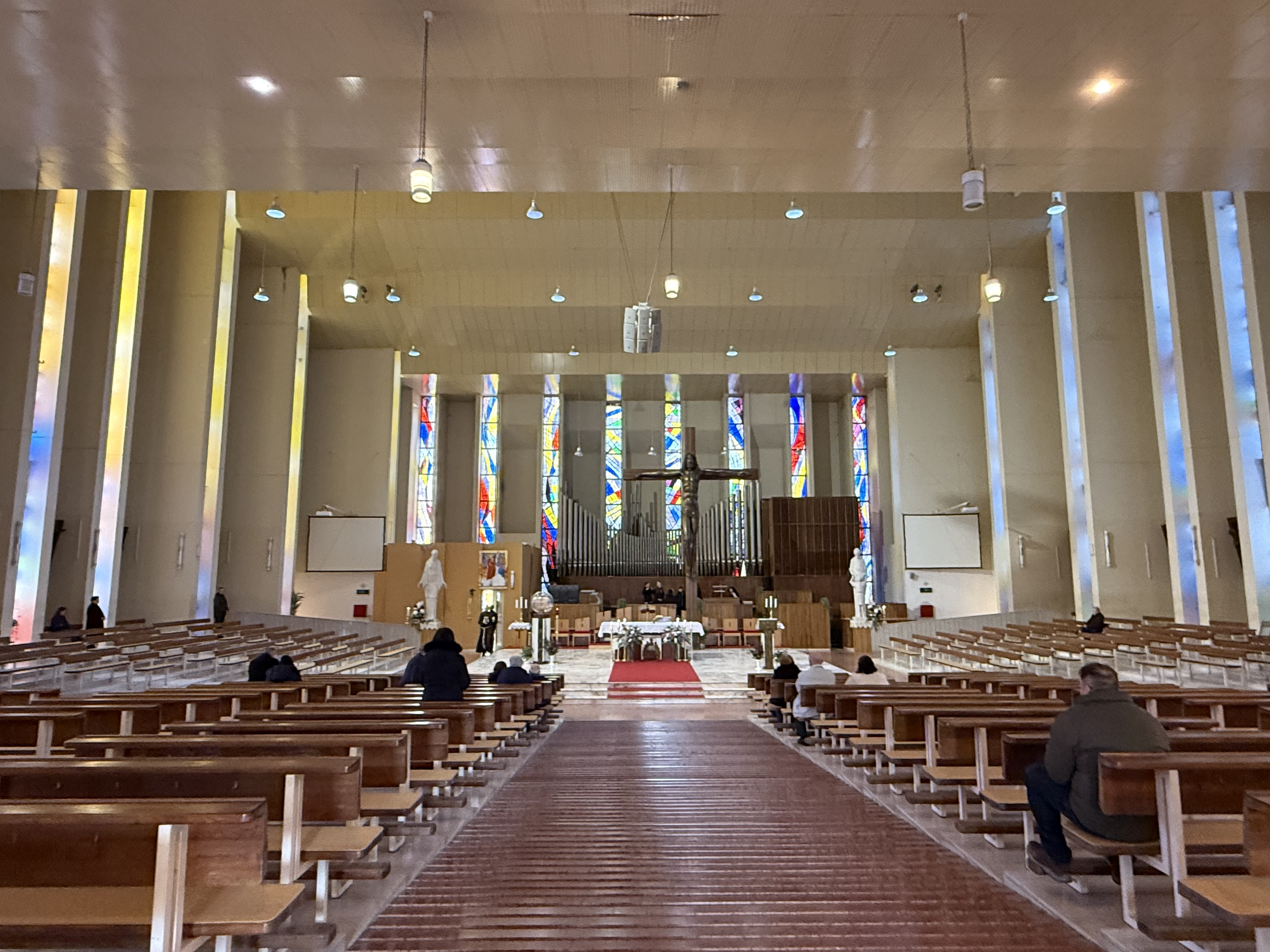
View towards the altar

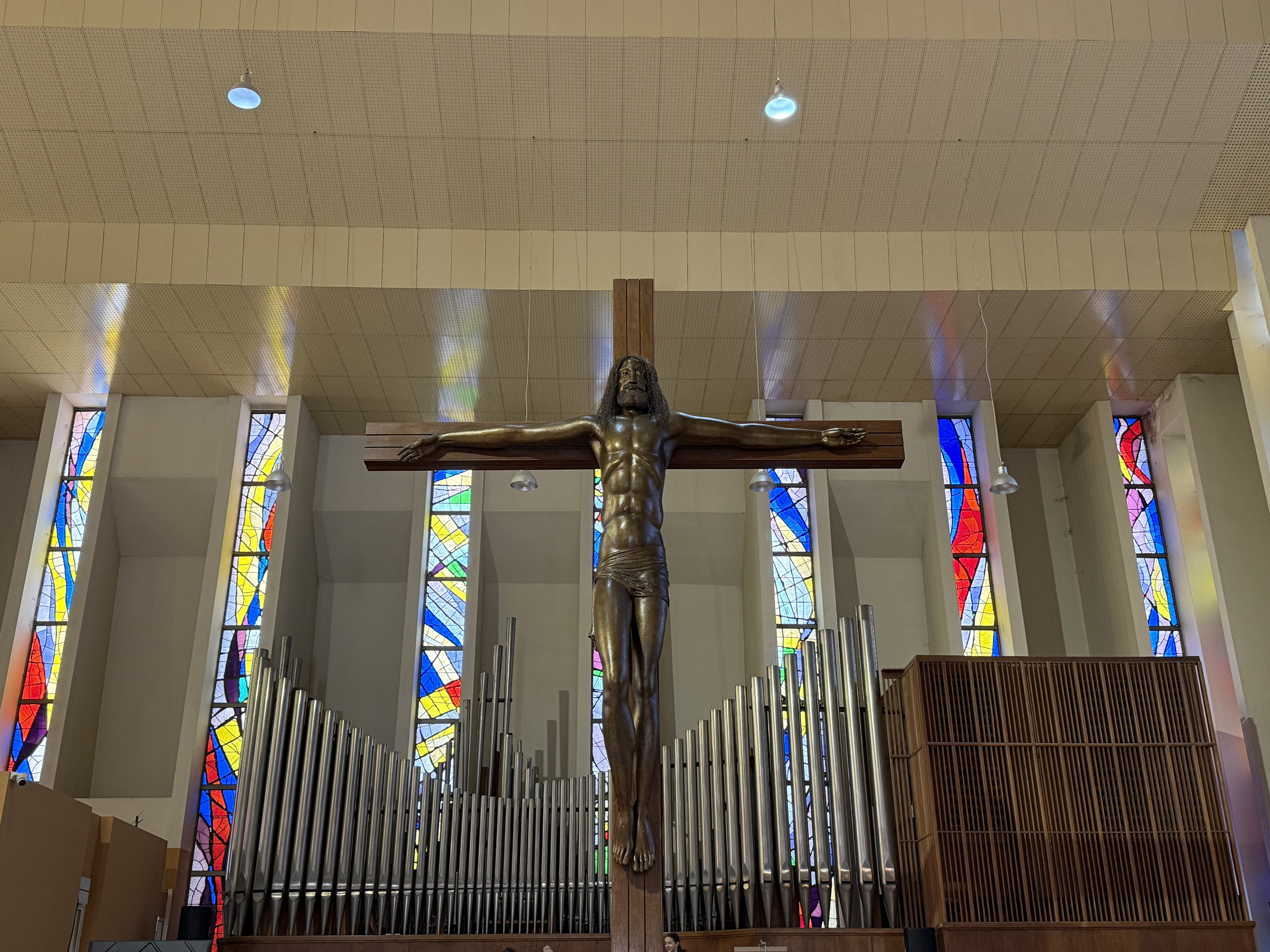
Altar and organ

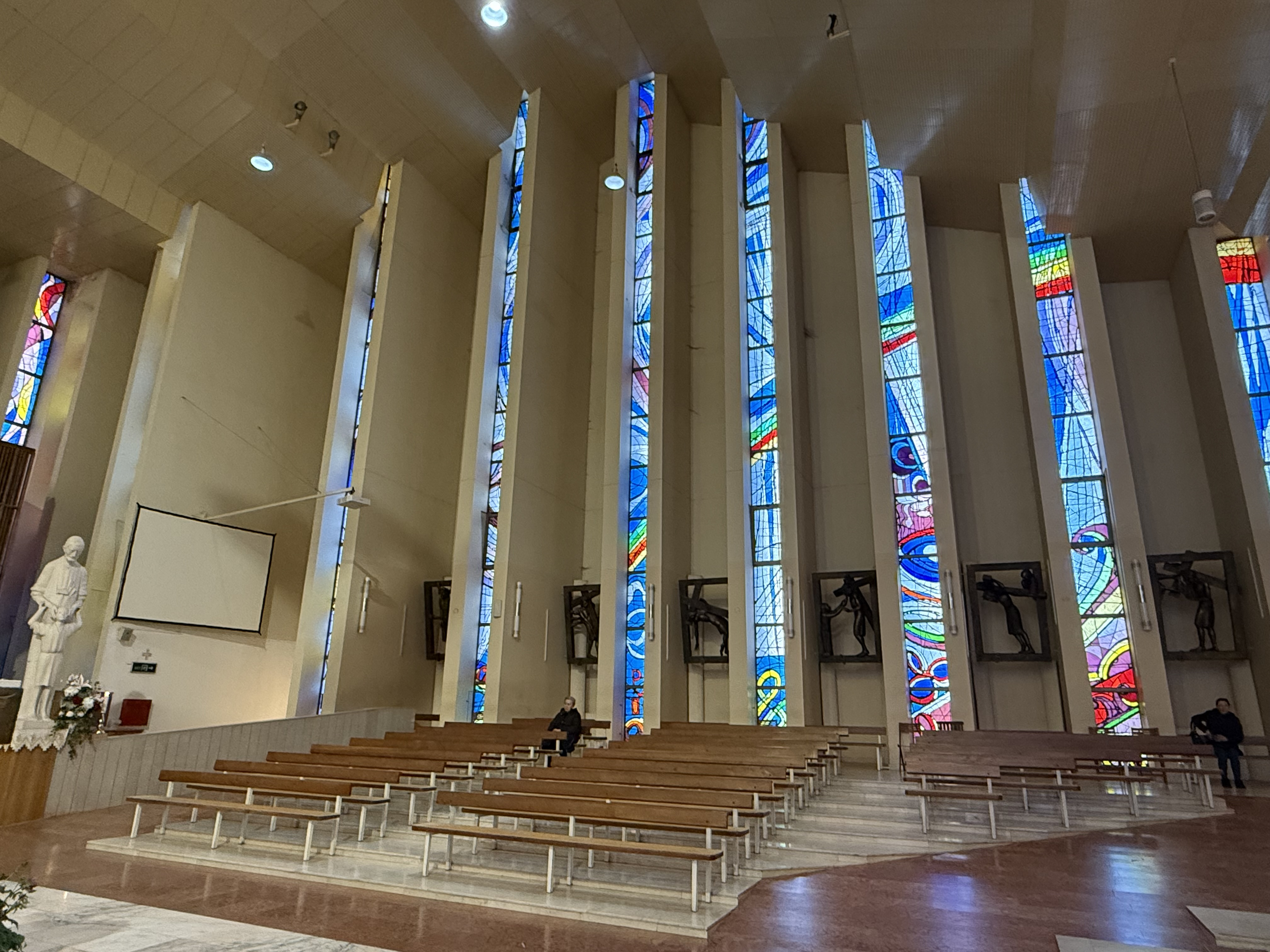
The vestibule on the side of the church

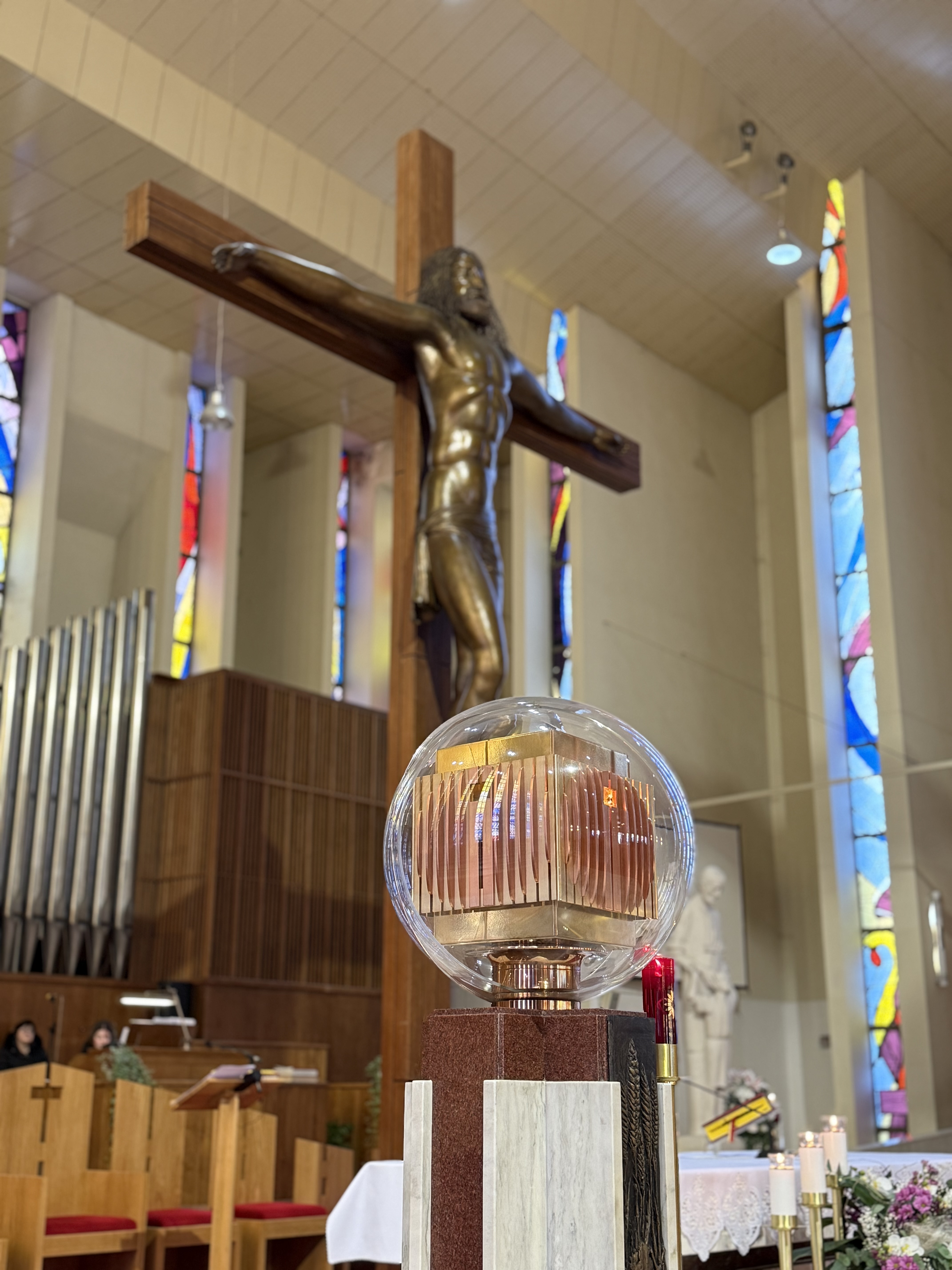
Altar and crucifix
