= Church of the Exaltation of the Holy Cross, Kazan =

Coordinates: 55.7831°N 49.1275°E

Church of the Exaltation of the Holy Cross
- Храм Воздвижения Святого Креста
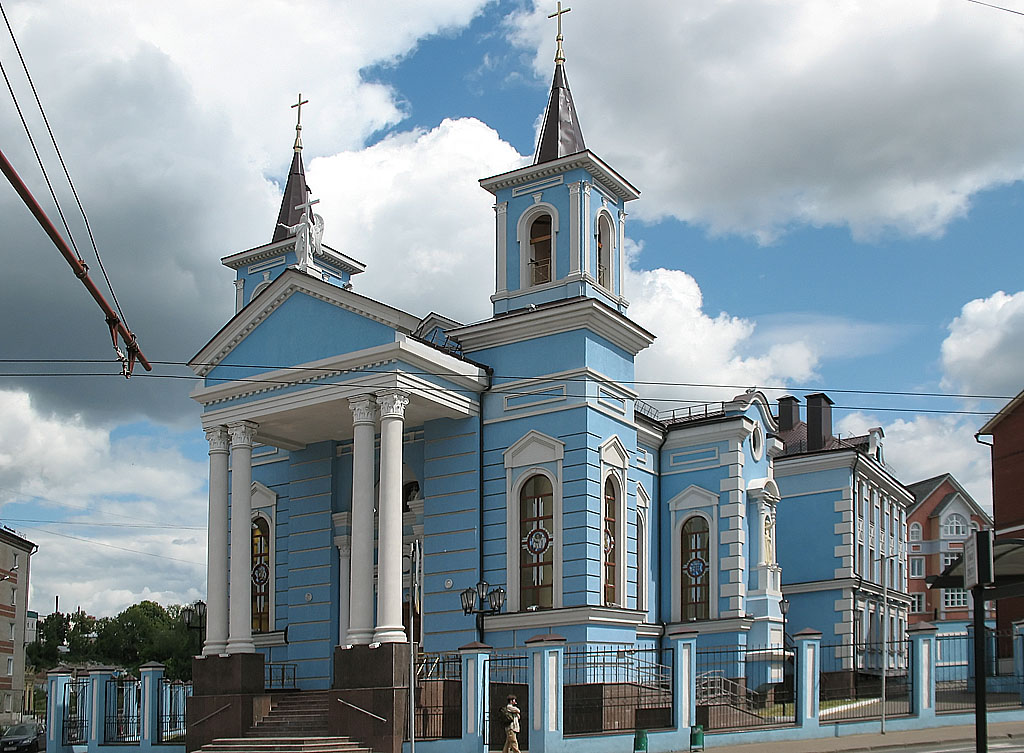
- Church of the Exaltation of the Holy Cross
- Location: Kazan
- Country: Russia
- Denomination: Roman Catholic Church

The Church of the Exaltation of the Holy Cross (Russian: Храм Воздвижения Святого Креста) is a Roman Catholic church in the city of Kazan (in the deanery of Bashkortostan), Tatarstan, Russia, under the Diocese of Saratov.

The first modern Catholics came to Kazan in the eighteenth century and were mainly of German origin. In 1835, the first parish was founded by Polish priests, and its parishioners gathered in private homes or temporary structures. The Catholic population, mostly of Polish origin, increased steadily, and the city of Kazan ultimately granted permission to build the church in 1855. Permission to build the church came with the conditions that the church would not stand out from the surrounding buildings and would not display a strong traditional Roman Catholic architectural character.

Kazan's Catholic parish dispersed during the era of communism and was reconvened in 1995, but the church was not returned to the Catholic community. Officials of the city instead authorized the use of a small chapel located in one of the city's cemeteries. Once restored, the chapel was consecrated by Bishop Pickel in 1998. A few years later, due to the removal of the wind tunnel from the old church, city authorities decided to allocate land in the center of Kazan to the Catholic community. Construction of the new church began in 2005 and took three years to complete.

On 29 August 2008, the new church was consecrated during a ceremony led by the Dean of the College of Cardinals, Angelo Sodano, in the presence of the Bishop Clemens Pickel, the Apostolic Nuncio Antonio Mennini, and other leaders.

== See also ==
- Roman Catholicism in Russia
- Exaltation of the Holy Cross

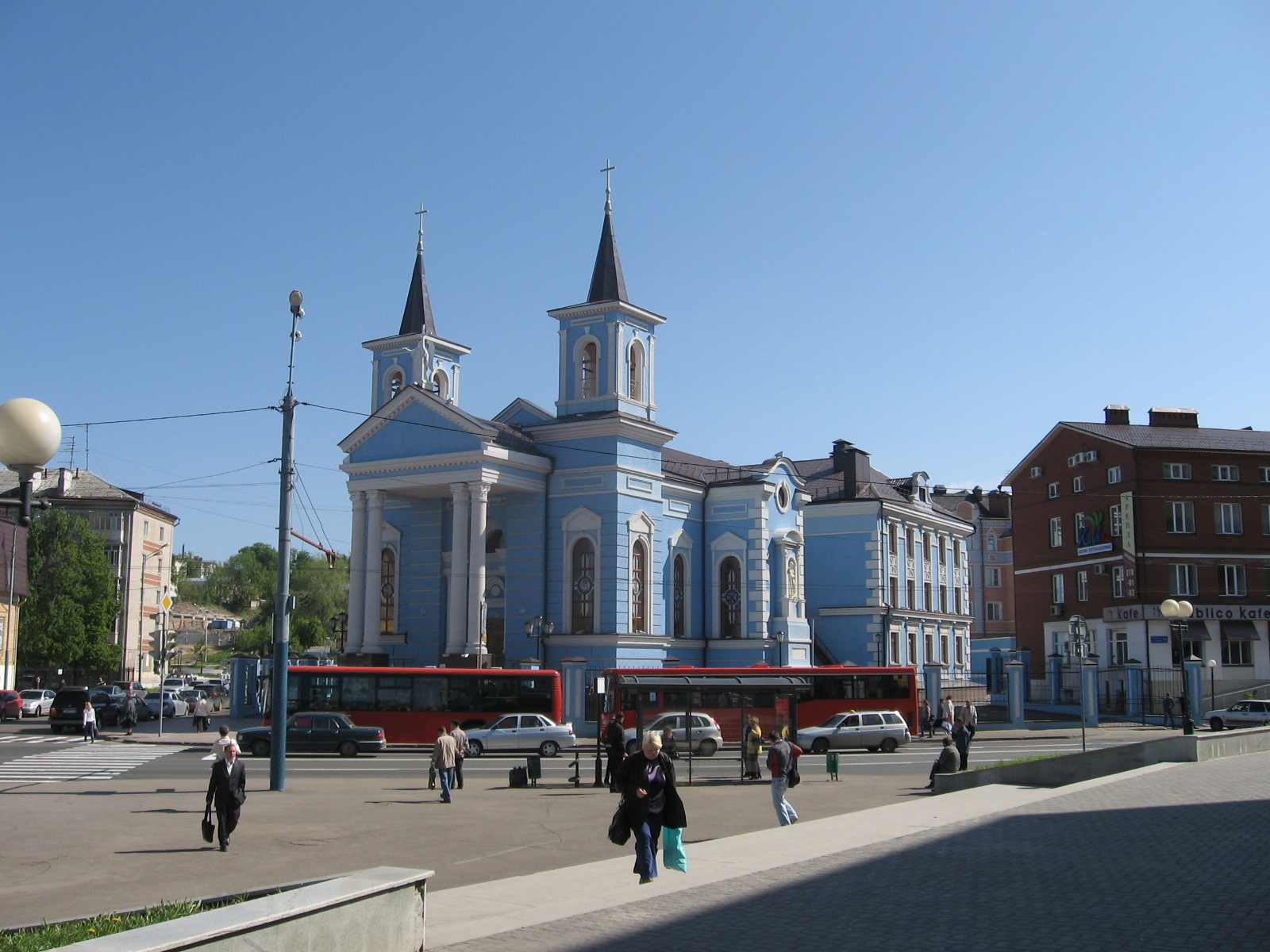
Another View
