= Verbi dei minister =

Christian title

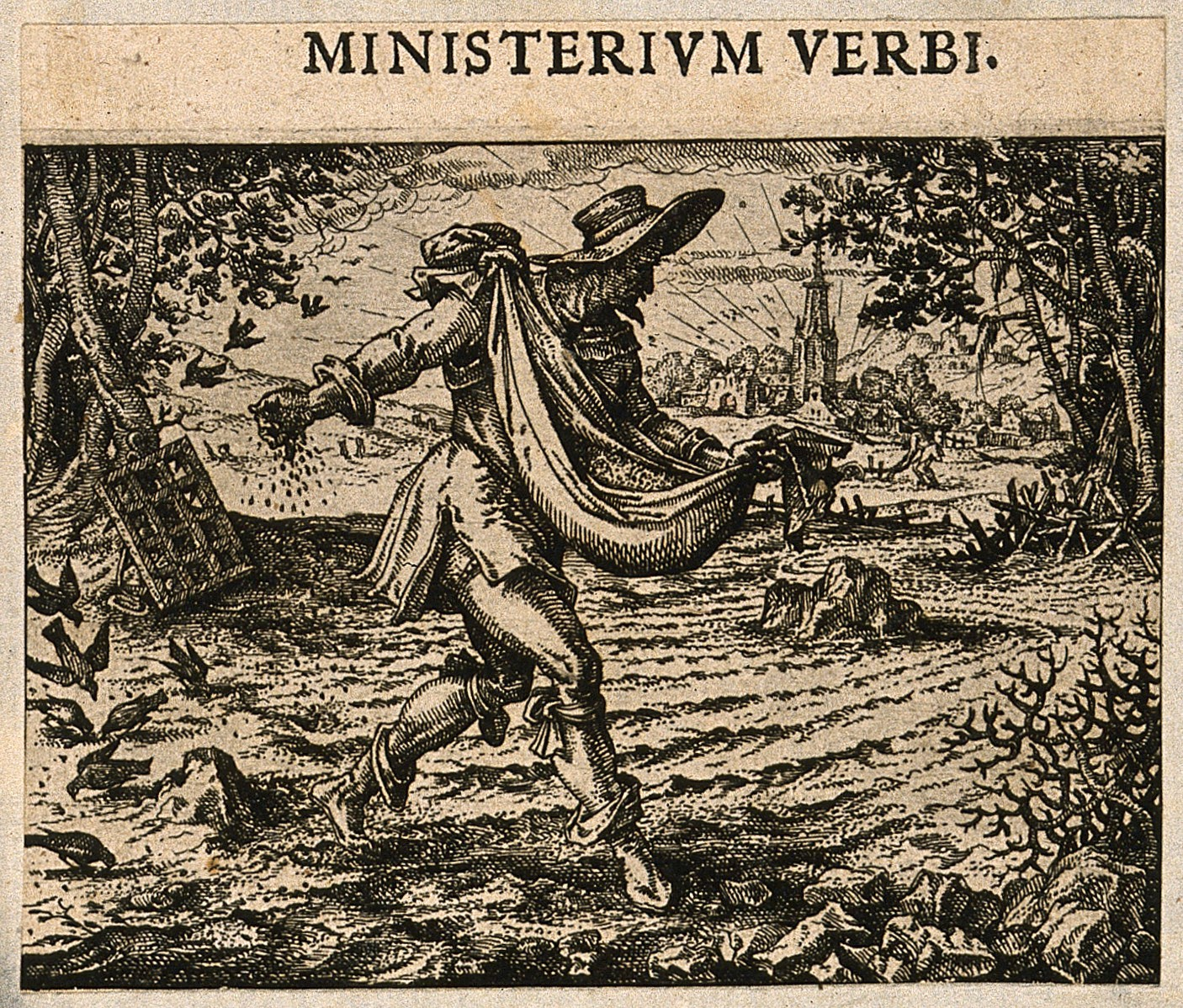
A man scatters seeds; representing the Biblical parable of the sower; here referring to the "ministry of the word", preaching. Etching by C. Murer after himself, c. 1600–1614.

Verbi Dei minister (Minister of the Word of God), also verbi divini minister (Minister of the Divine Word), is a Latin religious title abbreviated V.D.M., denoting a minister or pastor within some Lutheran and Reformed churches. The expression dates from the Second Helvetic Confessions of 1562, where the Swiss reformer Heinrich Bullinger formulated a credo that came to spread throughout German speaking countries. In the 2017 reader on the Reformation Jubilee, the Evangelical Church in Germany suggests that the reform theology of Martin Luther is not complete until Luther states that God's forgiveness and justification works through the Word of God, thus making the pastor a verbi divini minister.

== Modern usage ==
In the Church of Sweden, Verbi divini minister is a formal designation of the ordained ministry, and is mentioned as the primary expression of his or her ministry. In the Calvinistic tradition, the academic study of theology as a means of furthering the preaching ministry has been given a prominent position. Therefore, in Calvin's Switzerland there are to this day pastors of both sexes that are called "verbi divini ministeri".

== American Context ==
The term Verbi Dei Minister was typically appended as a post-nominal honorific style to a person's full name to denote his status as a Christian minister. The title was mostly used by Protestant ministers. It was very common in usage in the 18th and early 19th century but seems to have fallen out of use as the pre-nominal honorific style "Reverend" grew more common. Yet, there are also examples where both are used such as the 1751 letter from Samuel Davies to Mr. Bellamy on the state of religion among the Protestant dissenters of Virginia where Davies' name is styled, "Reverend Mr. Samuel Davies, V.D.M."

The Ledger stone for Olof Parlin in the Gloria Dei Church of Philadelphia, Pennsylvania provides one example of the use of this title in reference to the date that he was ordained. It says, "Stop, traveller, who art thyself mortal, and drop a tear upon this receptacle of corruption. Here lies quietly and in peace, after a happy death, a man conspicuous in erudition, taught of God, the most reverend, most learned OLOF PARLIN, Provost of the Swedish-Lutheran churches which are collected by God in North America, and placed as most worthy pastor over that in Wicacoa. He was born in Sweden, A. D., 1716, ordained minister of the Divine Word, A. D., 1745, came to America in 1750, was married in 1751, and died December 22, 1757."

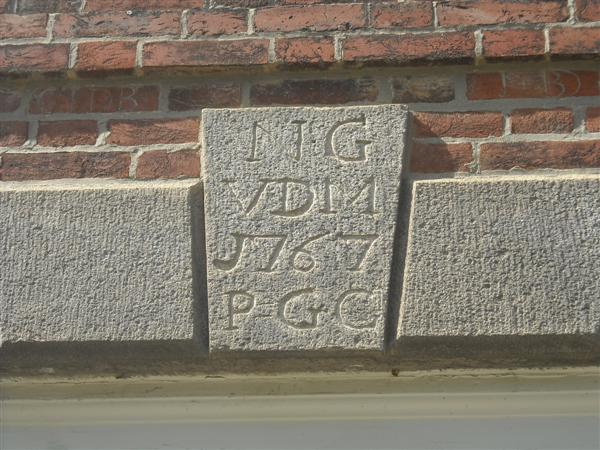
The center stone of the lintel reads "N.G. V.D.M. 1767 P.G.C." "N.G." is Nehemiah Greenman; "V.D.M." stands for Verbi Dei Minister (minister of the Word of God); "1767" is the year of construction; "P.G.C." is Piles Grove Church which was the name of the congregation at the time of construction.

Another example is found in this inscription from a Church record book. It says, "This is to certify that the Rev Winslow Paige A.M., V.D.M. became the pastor of the united congregation of the Reformed Dutch Church in the towns of Broome, Windham and Blenheim on the 1st day of April 1820" The A.M. is the Latin abbreviation indicating that he holds a Master of Arts degree and the V.D.M. means he was an ordained minister.

A third example of its usage is found in a letter from the Consistory of the Dutch Reformed Church in Raritan, New Jersey, to General George Washington in 1779. The letter closes, "by order of the Consistory, Jacob R Hardenburgh, V.D.M."

A fourth example of its usage and explanation of meaning is found in a biographical sketch for a man named Robert Hamilton of Adams County, Ohio. It says, "On the twentieth of July, 1825, Mr Hamilton was married to Nancy Ellison, daughter of John Ellison. She was the sister of the late William Ellison, of Manchester. The marriage ceremony was performed by the Rev William Williamson, who signed his name to the certificate V.D.M.", (Verbi Dei Minister), which was the fashion at that time, which translated is "Of the Word of God, Minister."

Other examples are the title page of an 1849 autobiography of Ashbel Green and the 1767 center stone of the lintel at the Pittsgrove Presbyterian Church in Salem County, New Jersey.
