= Catholic Holy Cross Church, Augsburg =

Catholic church in Augsburg

Coordinates: 48°22′16″N 10°53′30″E

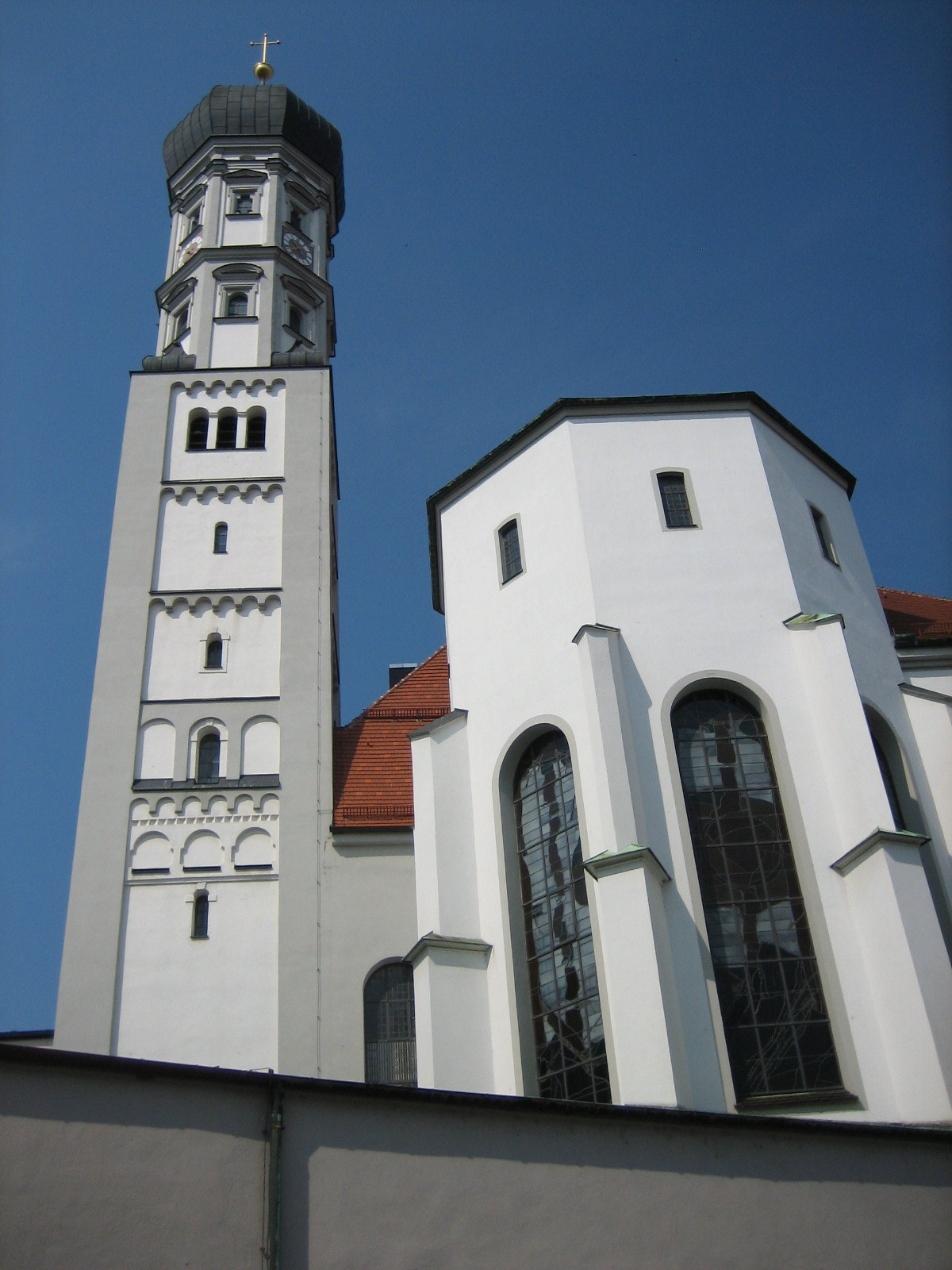
Catholic Holy Cross Church, Augsburg

The Catholic Holy Cross Church (German: Katholische Heilig-Kreuz-Kirche) is a Roman Catholic parish church in the southern German city of Augsburg, Bavaria. While its history dates back to 1143 when a hospice with a chapel was constructed on the site, the present church in the Gothic style was built by Provost Vitus Fackler in 1508. After bombing damage in the Second World War, rebuilding work was completed in 1949.

Right next to this church is the Evangelical Holy Cross Church, Augsburg.

== History ==
The site of the Holy Cross Hospice was located outside the town walls of Augsburg. The name stems from an ancient cross relic which can still be seen in the Diocesan Museum. In the late 12th century, the Bishop of Augsburg put the hospice into the care of the Augustinian Canons Regular. At the beginning of the 13th century, a small wooden church for the parishioners and a simple convent were built.

A miracle was said to have occurred in 1194 when a woman took a piece of the sacramental communion bread back home. The longer she kept it, the more it appeared to be transformed into a mysterious blood-red object. Five years later, she finally confessed to her misdemeanor and returned the sacrement to the priest. A miracle was declared, making the church a popular destination for pilgrimages right up to the 20th century.

A wooden church tower was built around 1200 on graves dating from Roman times but it burnt to the ground in 1314. As a result, a stone church in the Romanesque style together with a new convent was built the following year. In 1502, unhappy with the Romanesque building, Provost Vitus Fackler had a large Gothic hall church built, probably charging Burkhart Engelberg with its design. After it was completed in 1508, a higher tower and a copper roof were added (1514–1517). In 1627, Provost Johannes Schall provided the church with a new altar, seats and a pulpit. A full transformation to the Baroque style was completed by Johann Jakob Herkommer under the leadership of Provost Augustin von Imhoff in 1716.

After serious bomb damage in February 1944 which left little more than the outer walls and the organ loft, painstaking rebuilding work was completed in 1949. Repairs to the adjacent convent building were completed in 1958.
