= Holy Cross Church, Gampaha =

Roman Catholic church in Gampaha, Sri Lanka

- Sinhala: සිරි කුරුස දේවස්ථානය, ගම්පහ
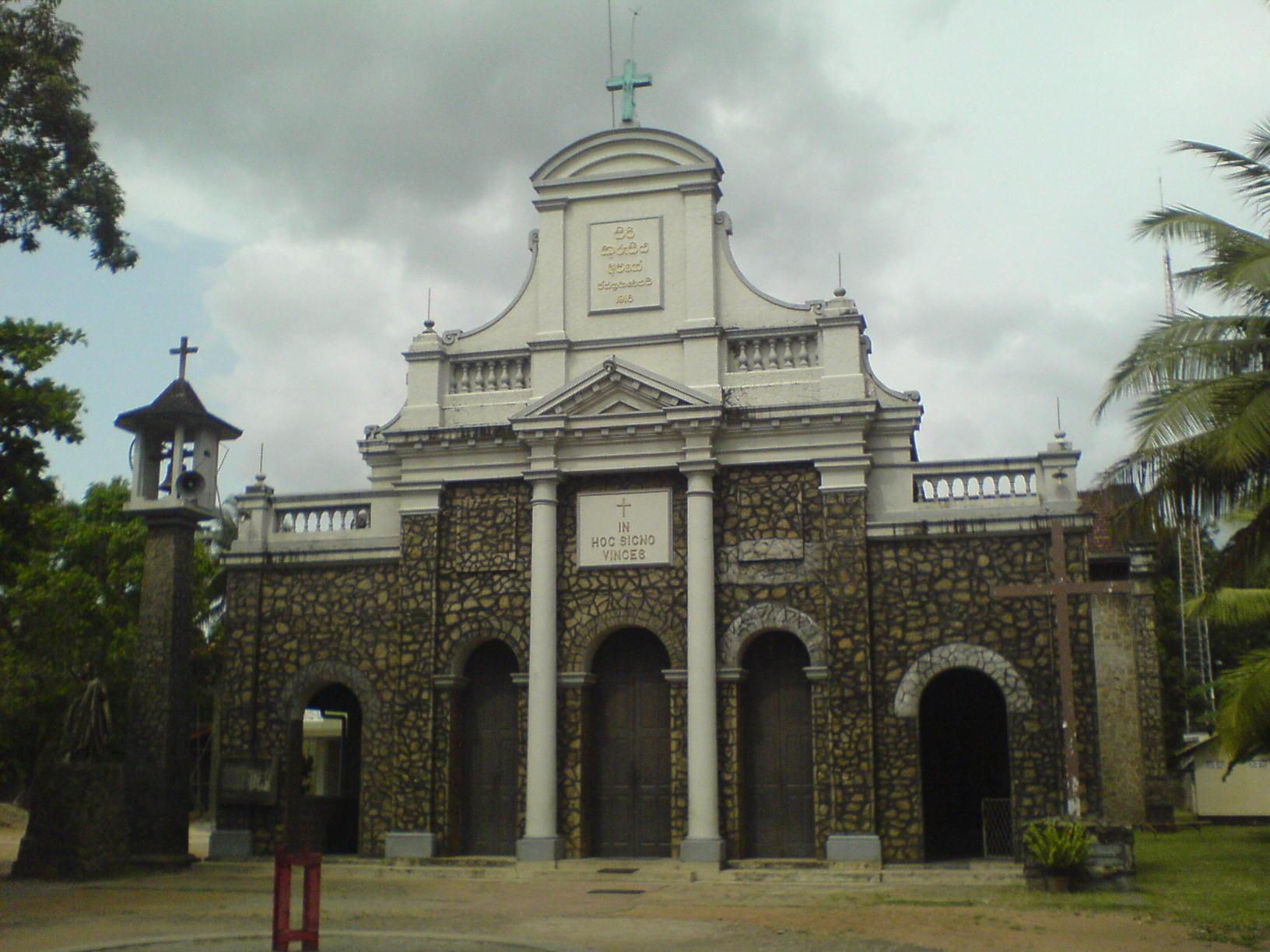
- Front facade

- Location in Sri Lanka
- 7.0943°N 79.9956°E
- Location: Marybiso Road, Gampaha
- Country: Sri Lanka
- Languages: Sinhala; English
- Denomination: Roman Catholic

History
- Status: Parish church
- Founded: 7 May 1916
- Founder: (Rev. Fr.) Gregorius Silva
- Dedication: The Holy Cross

Architecture
- Functional status: Active
- Completed: 14 September 1918

Administration
- District: Gampaha District
- Province: Western Province
- Archdiocese: Archdiocese of Colombo
- Diocese: Colombo
- Deanery: Weliweriya
- Parish: Welieriya parish

Clergy
- Archbishop: Malcolm Ranjith

Holy Cross Church, Gampaha Sinhala: සිරි කුරුස දේවස්ථානය, ගම්පහ is a Roman Catholic church located in Gampaha, Sri Lanka. It was founded in 1916 as a parish church of the Archdiocese of Colombo. The church is nicknamed "Gal Palliya/ගල් පල්ලිය" meaning "Rock Church" since the church facade is encrusted with gneiss stone.

== History ==
A Holy Cross Church was known to be located near the heart of Gampaha during the Portuguese ruling period in Sri Lanka(1505–1658). This was during the reign of King Rajasingha II (1629–1687), the third king of the Kingdom of Kandy in Sri Lanka.

In 1658 the Dutch expelled Portuguese and took control over some parts of Sri Lanka. The Dutch era was known to be a disastrous time for Sri Lankan Catholics since they were opposed to the Roman Catholicism and other traditional religions. The original church was abandoned and was completely ruined.

On 7 May 1916, the groundbreaking was done for a new church building under the guidance of Rev.Fr. Gregorius Silva, the Head of Weliweriya deanery. The church was completed and opened to the public in 1918.

== Apostolic blessing ==
An Apostolic Blessing certificate was received from Pope John Paul II for the 75th anniversary of Holy Cross Church in 1991.

== Relics held ==
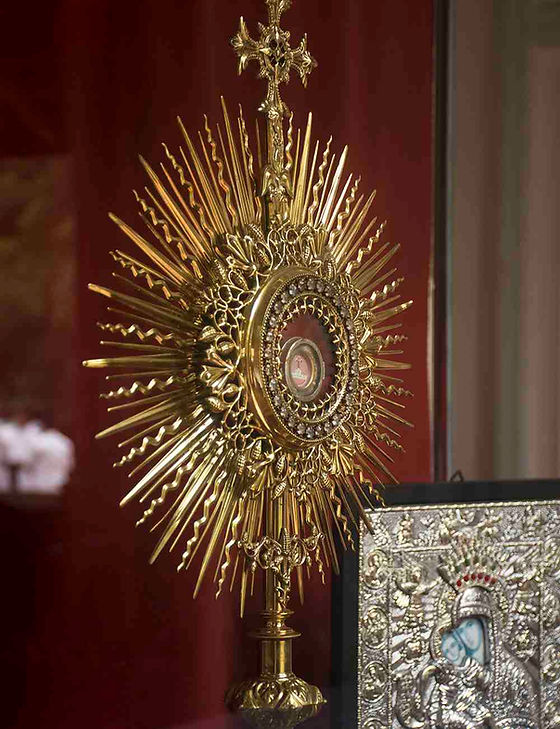
Reliquary at the Holy Cross Church, Gampaha

Tiny wood fragment from the very own cross which Jesus died is kept away from elements inside a solar monstrance inspired reliquary.

== Parish priests and assistant priests ==
Priest	Time period
Rev.Fr. Gregory Silva	1910 - 1922
Rev.Fr. P J Dominic O.M.I.	1922 - 1934
Rev.Fr. Alexis Seru O.M.I.	1930 - 1931
Rev.Fr. J M Kerbul O.M.I.	1932 Feb - Sep
Rev.Fr. J Santiago	1932 - 1933
Rev.Fr. D B Jacqualine	1933 - 1934
Rev.Fr. Joseph Aloxias O.M.I.	1934 - 1935
Rev.Fr. A Godwin Fernando	1935 - 1937
Rev.Fr. Peter Fernando	1937 Sep - Dec
Rev.Fr. A Marges O.M.I.	1938 - 1940
Rev.Fr. F Desigo O.M.I.	1938 - 1940
Rev.Fr. L M V Thomas O.M.I.	1941 - 1943
Rev.Fr. Elias Weerakkody O.M.I.	1943 - 1947
Rev.Fr. Julius Wijesuriya O.M.I.	1947 - 1949
Rev.Fr. Philip C Dissanayaka O.M.I.	1949 - 1955
Rev.Fr. J L Mique O.M.I.	1955 - 1961
Rev.Fr. Kingsley Perera	1961 - 1965
Rev.Fr. Emil Perera O.M.I.	1965 - 1966
Rev.Fr. Reginold De Silva O.M.I.	1966 - 1967
Rev.Fr. J Edwin Fernando	1967 - 1971
Rev.Fr. Stanely Wedasinghe	1971 - 1971 July
Rev.Fr. Don Tuder Paulinus O.M.I.	1971 - 1975
Rev.Fr. Petrik M Fernando	1975 - 1976
Rev.Fr. Don Tuder Paulinus O.M.I.	1976 - 1979
Rev.Fr. D A Dasanayaka O.M.I.	1979 - 1980
Rev.Fr. Lewge Hettiarachchi O.M.I.	1980 - 1987
Rev.Fr. Arnest Premasiri O.M.I.	1987 Mar - Sep
Rev.Fr. Sarath Silva O.M.I.	1987 Sep - 1988 Aug
Rev.Fr. P Satanis Lourse O.M.I.	1988 - 1993
Rev.Fr. Siril Perera O.M.I.	1993 - 1995
Rev.Fr. Bernard Nevil	1995 - 2001
Rev.Fr. Edmund Thilakaratne	2001 Jan - 2002 Oct
Rev.Fr. Canitius Moraes	2002 - 2007
Rev.Fr. Kingsley Iwan Appuhami	2008 - 2013 May
Rev.Fr. Hemantha Perera	2013–present

=== Assistant priests ===
Name	Time period
Rev.Fr. Edward Pieris	1932 - 1933
Rev.Fr. D Senanayake	1935 Jan - Aug
Rev.Fr. L Didelo O.M.I.	1940 - 1942
Rev.Fr. O J Perera O.M.I.	1942
Rev.Fr. V Koopel O.M.I.	1949 Jan - Aug
Rev.Fr. Reginold De Silva O.M.I.	1940 - 1951
Rev.Fr. M Emmanuel O.M.I.	1951 - 1953
Rev.Fr. Philip De Silva O.M.I.	1953 - 1955
Rev.Fr. Leon Babapulile O.M.I.	1990 - 1991

== Namesakes ==
Other Holy Cross Churches in the Archdiocese of Colombo, Sri Lanka;

- Holy Cross Church, Pulasthigama, Anuradhapura
- Holy Cross Church, Kalutara
- Holy Cross Church, Mahahunupitiya, Negombo
- Holy Cross Church, Mirigama
- Holy Cross Church, Tarala, Pugoda
