= Church of the Exaltation of the Holy Cross, Vileyka =

Church of the Exaltation of the Holy Cross
- Касцёл Узвіжання Святога Крыжа
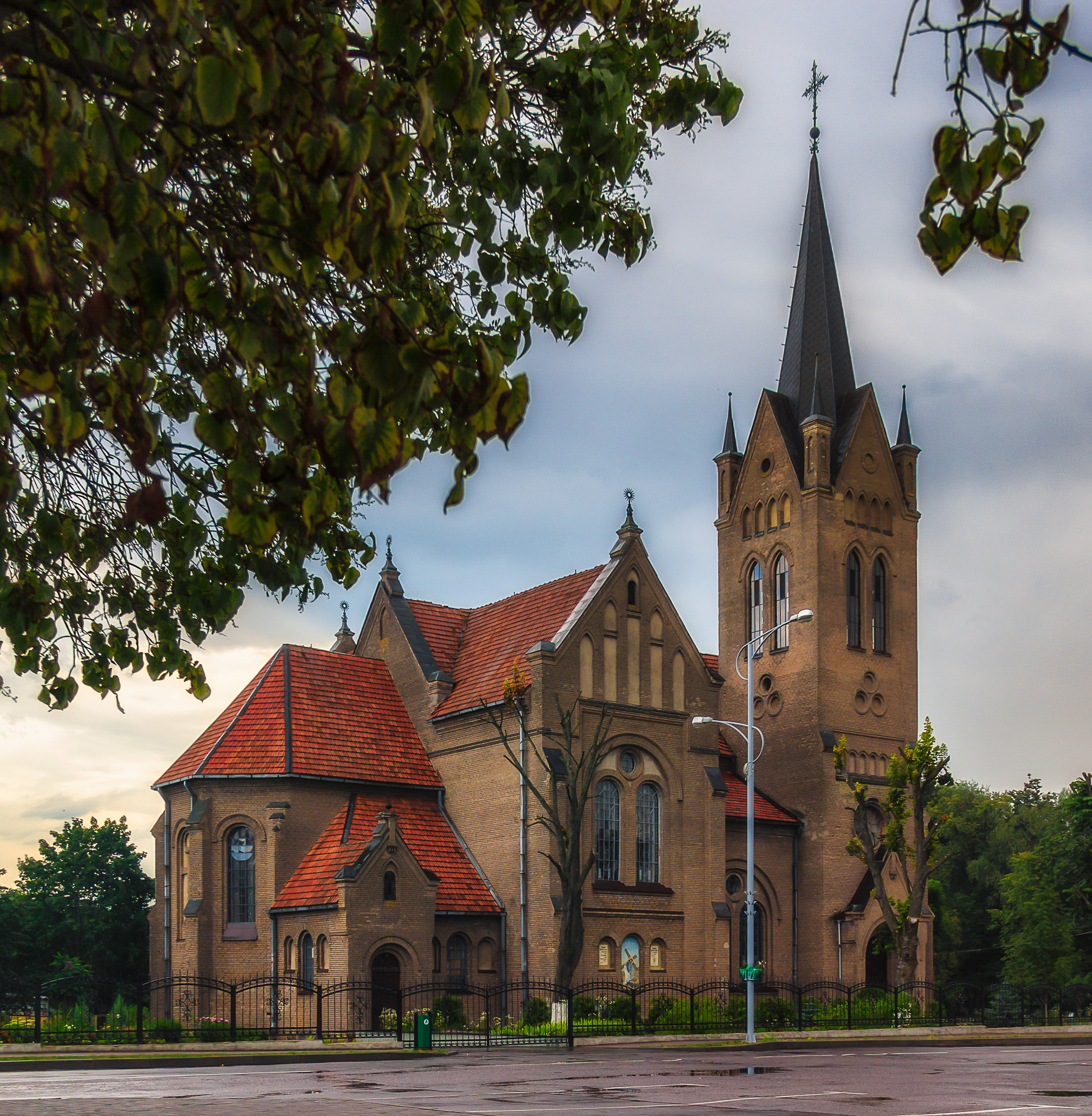
- Church of the Exaltation of the Holy Cross
- 54.48885°N 26.91536°E
- Location: Vileyka
- Country: Belarus
- Denomination: Roman Catholic church

Architecture
- Architect: August Klein
- Style: Gothic Revival architecture, Romanesque Revival architecture
- Years built: 1906—1913

Administration
- Diocese: Roman Catholic Archdiocese of Minsk–Mohilev

Church of the Exaltation of the Holy Cross is a Catholic church in Vileyka, Belarus. Built between 1906 and 1913, it is now listed as a Belarusian Cultural Heritage object.

== History ==
A small wooden chapel was built in Vileyka in the 18th century and burned down in 1810. In 1852 a new stone building was built in its place, and at the same time the construction of a new stone church began. In the aftermath of the January Uprising the authorities gave the unfinished building to the Eastern Orthodox church. The Orthodox completed the church and consecrated it in honor of Saint George.

The new permit to construct a brick church was received in 1906. The construction work was finished in 1913, and the new church was consecrated in honor of the Feast of the Cross. It was designed in a combination of Neo-Gothic and Neo-Romanesque styles. The building was damaged during World War I and restored between 1922 and 1928.

== Gallery ==
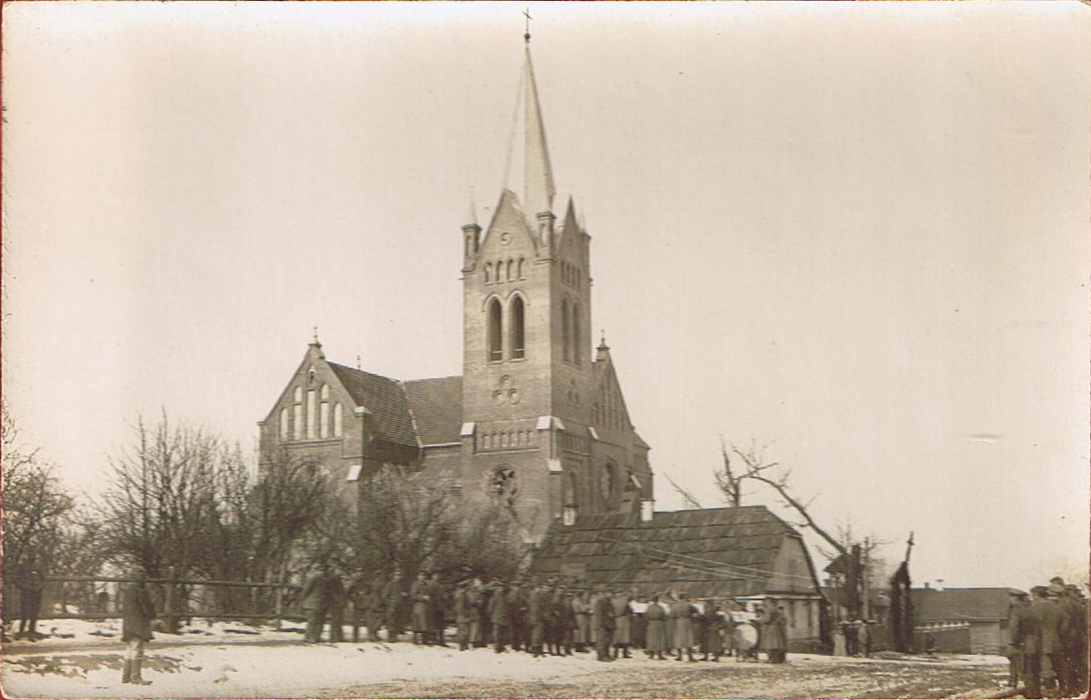
1918 photo

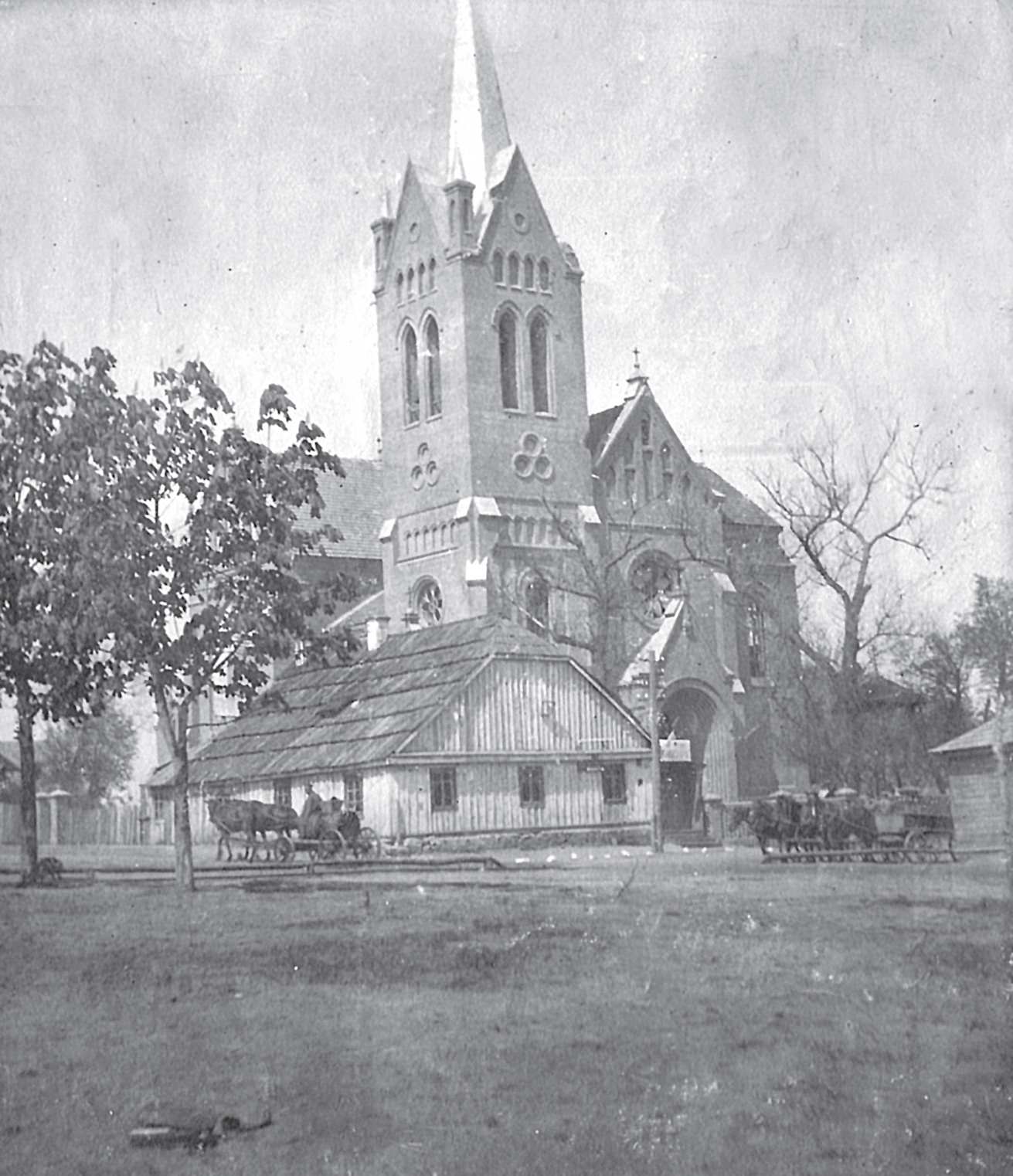
1915 photo

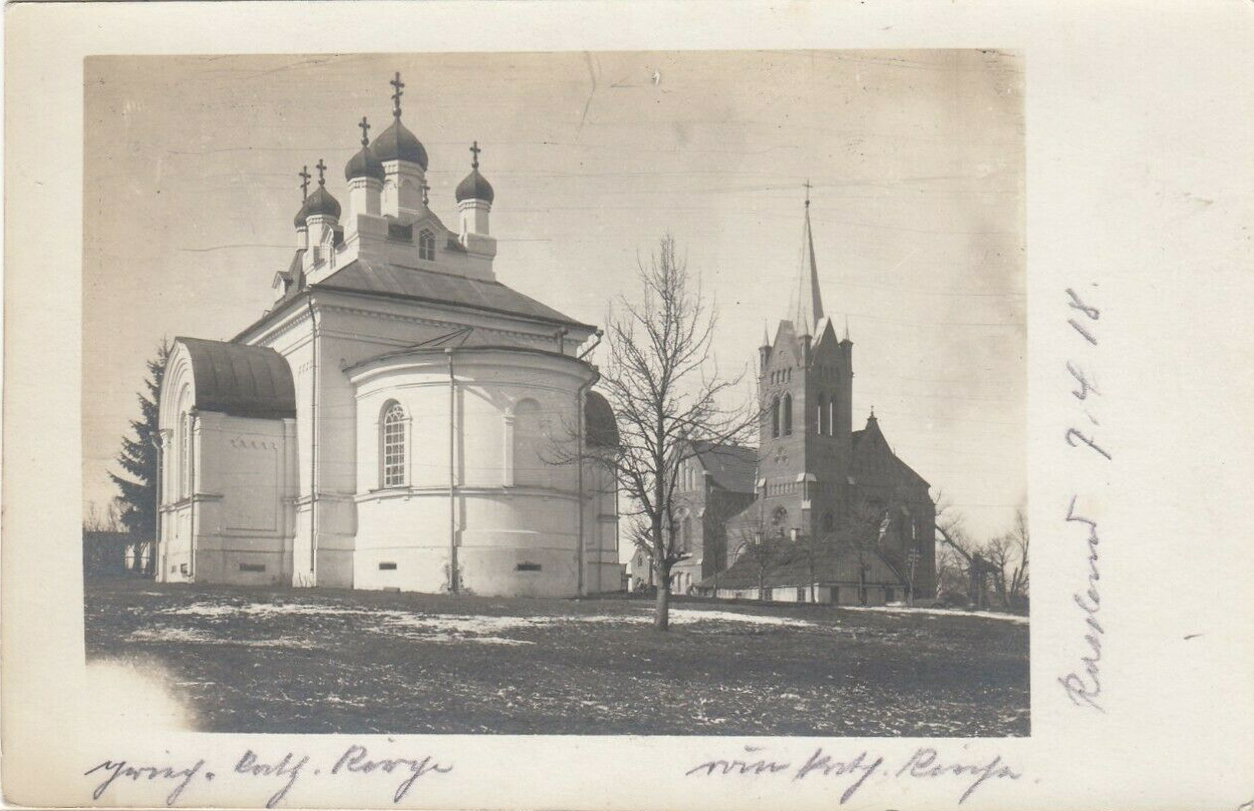
1918 photo

== Sources ==
- Kulagin, A. M. (2008). Каталіцкія храмы Беларусі [Catholic Churches of Belarus]. Minsk: Про Хрысто. ISBN 978-985-11-0395-5.
- Pyatrosova, A. U. (1987). Збор помнікаў гісторыі і культуры. Мінская вобласць. Кніга 1 [Collection of Cultural Heritage Monuments in Minsk region. Book 1]. Minsk: Беларуская Савецкая Энцыклапедыя імя Петруся Броўкі. p. 137.
