= Parish of the Exaltation of the Holy Cross Prostějov =

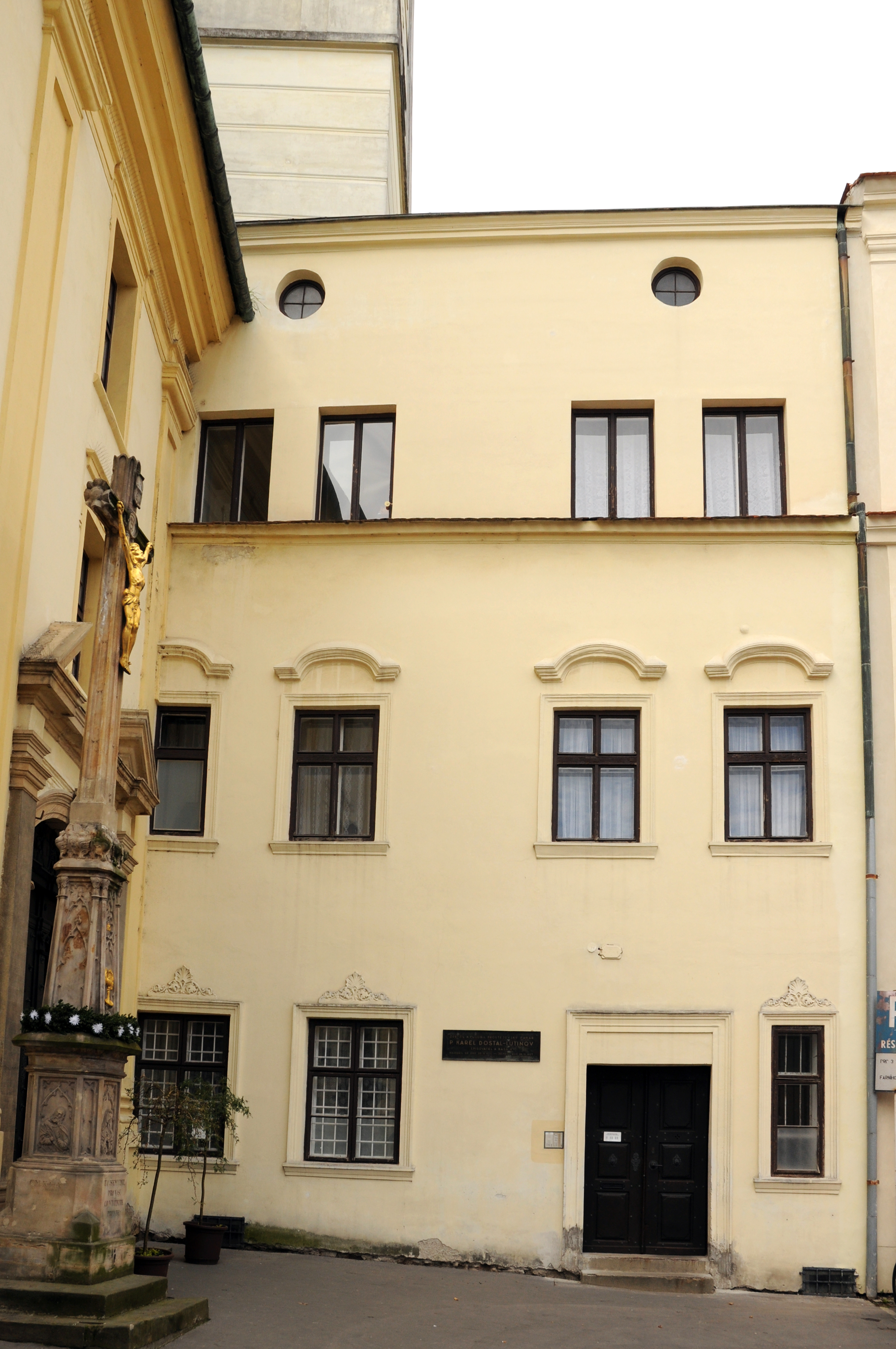
- Parish of the Exaltation of the Holy Cross Prostějov
- 49°28′18.34″N 17°6′43.87″E
- Location: Prostějov, Moravia
- Country: Czech Republic
- Denomination: Roman Catholic Church

Clergy
- Dean: R. D. Aleš Vrzala

The Roman Catholic Parish of the Exaltation of the Holy Cross (Czech: Římskokatolická farnost Povýšení svatého Kříže) is Roman Catholic parish in Prostějov, Moravia. The exact year of foundation of the parish is not known. It is estimated the period before 1200. Parish unites Catholic believers in Prostějov and cares for their spiritual needs.

== History ==
The first known spiritual administrator in the history of the parish was Jakub (first mentioned in 1383). In 1391 there was founded augustinian monastery by Peter of Kravare. All churches in Prostějov were transferred to the authority of the new monastery. The monastery was burned by Hussites in 1430. Augustinians and other Catholic burghers fled to Olomouc. Parish was led by Hussite and Protestant priests since 1522 to recatholization in 1622.

== Pastors ==
- 1383 Jakub, plebanus
- 1405 Jan I., first provost of Prostějov
- 1406 Jakub I., provost
- 1430 Marek, provost
- 1437 Sigmund, provost
- 1459 Adam, provost
- 1481 Václav (Venceslaus de Cracovia), provost
- 1489 Jakub Wyznar de longa villa, called Jakub II., provost
- 1494 Jan Šťávka, provost
- 1507 Jan II., administrator

=== Non-Catholic period (1522–1622) ===
- 1545 Jan Zahrádka
- Jan Klenovský
- Jiřík
- Jan Charpa
- Jan
- 1560 Jan Maruin
- Matouš Brodský (Matheus Brodenus), dean
- 1572 Martin Kožišský
- 1575 Šimon
- 1576 Jan Klenovský
- 1577 Jan Adelfus
- 1585 Jakub Volenský
- 1586 Lukáš Vranovský
- 1587 Martin Boleslavský
- Jakub Melissaeus Krtský
- 1585 Martin Rychnovský
- 1596 Martin Svorcius Rychnovský
- 1609 Jiří Dikast z Miřkova
- 1613 Ondřej Dubnický (Dubenius)
- 1618 Jiřík Pivinský
- Jan Dobromělický

=== Catholic administration (1622–present) ===
- 1622 Jan Gottfried Hlaušek O.Praem
- 1625 Václav Jaich, SJ
- 1633 Michal Prokop (Prokopius)
- 1639 Jakub Vavřinec Capricius (Kozílek)
- 1663 Ignác z Ditrichšteina
- Jiří František Polentaria
- Václav Koutný
- 1664 Jiří Jan Wagner
- 1689 Jan Jakub Hofman
- 1688 František Ondřej of Mensdorf
- 1691 Martin Čimel (Czmela)
- 1695 Jiří Sigmund Hoffmann
- 1703 František Xaver Leffler
- 1709 Matěj Vejvoda
- 1717 Jan Bernard Lev Rothe
- 1720 Ferdinand Leopold Josef Bartodějský of Bartoděje
- 1730 Jan Birhel
- 1756 Bílovský
- 1749 Josef Frimmel
- 1759 Matouš Koppil
- 1761 Antonín Zillich
- 1765 Gabriel Finbinger
- 1787 František Keller
- 1810 Ignác Kirchner
- 1819 Josef Seeliger
- 1847 Jan Humdsfeld
- 1852 Josef Malý
- 1863 Josef Novák
- 1894 Ludvík Hofmann
- 1904 Karel Dostál-Lutinov
- 1923 Ignác Dragoun
- 1963 Vojtěch Cikryt
- 1990 Jan Gacík S.D.B.
- 1995 František Ptáček S.D.B.
- 2000 Pavel Krejčí S.D.B.
- 2006 Dan Žůrek S.D.B.
- 2013 Leo Červenka S.D.B.
- 2016 Aleš Vrzala

== Churches ==
- Parish Church of the Exaltation of the Holy Cross, Prostějov
- Filial Church of Saints Cyril and Methodius
- Filial Church of Saint Joseph
- Holy Trinity Chapel
- Chapel of Saint Anna
- Chapel of Guardian Angels
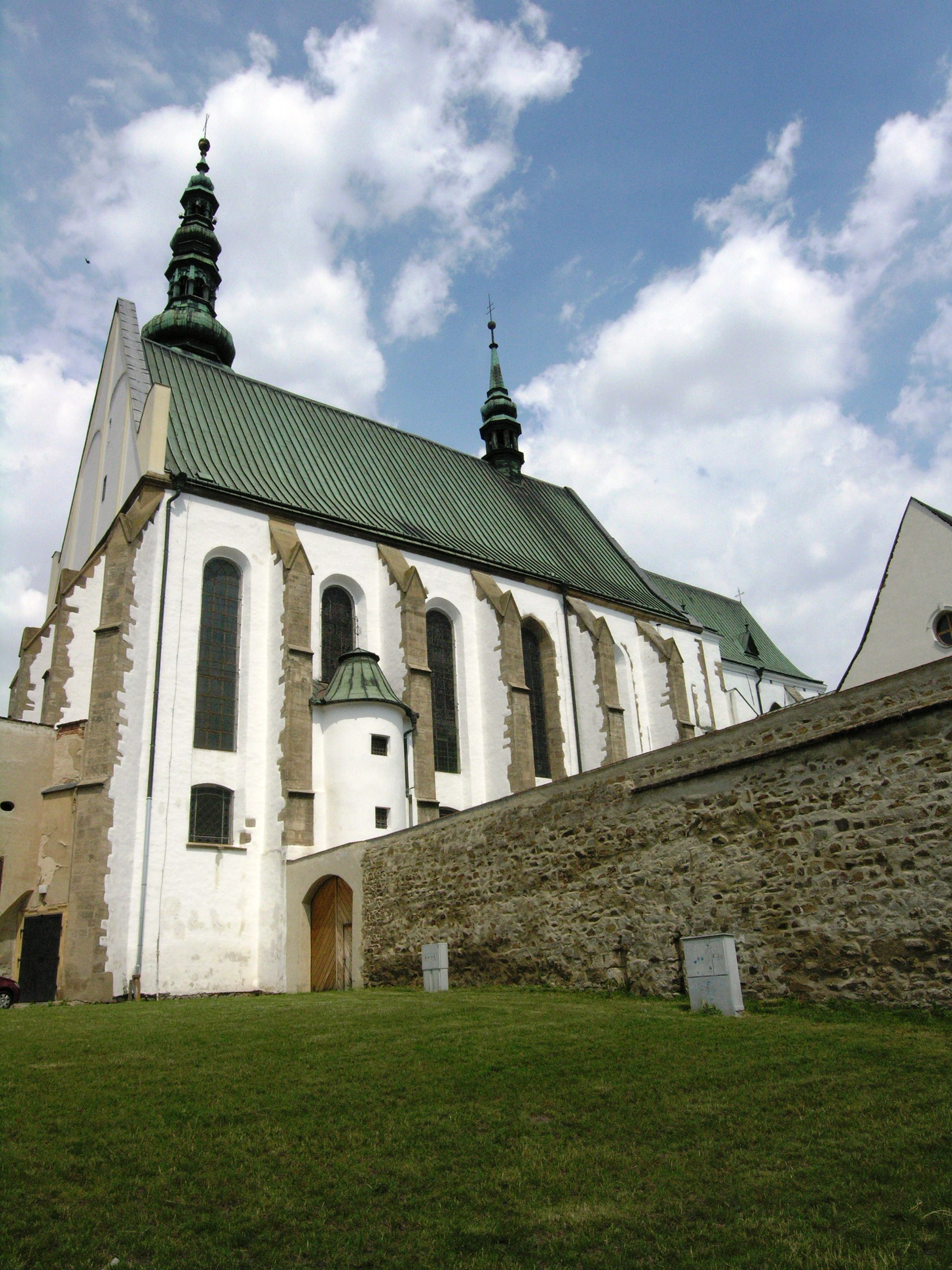
Parish Church

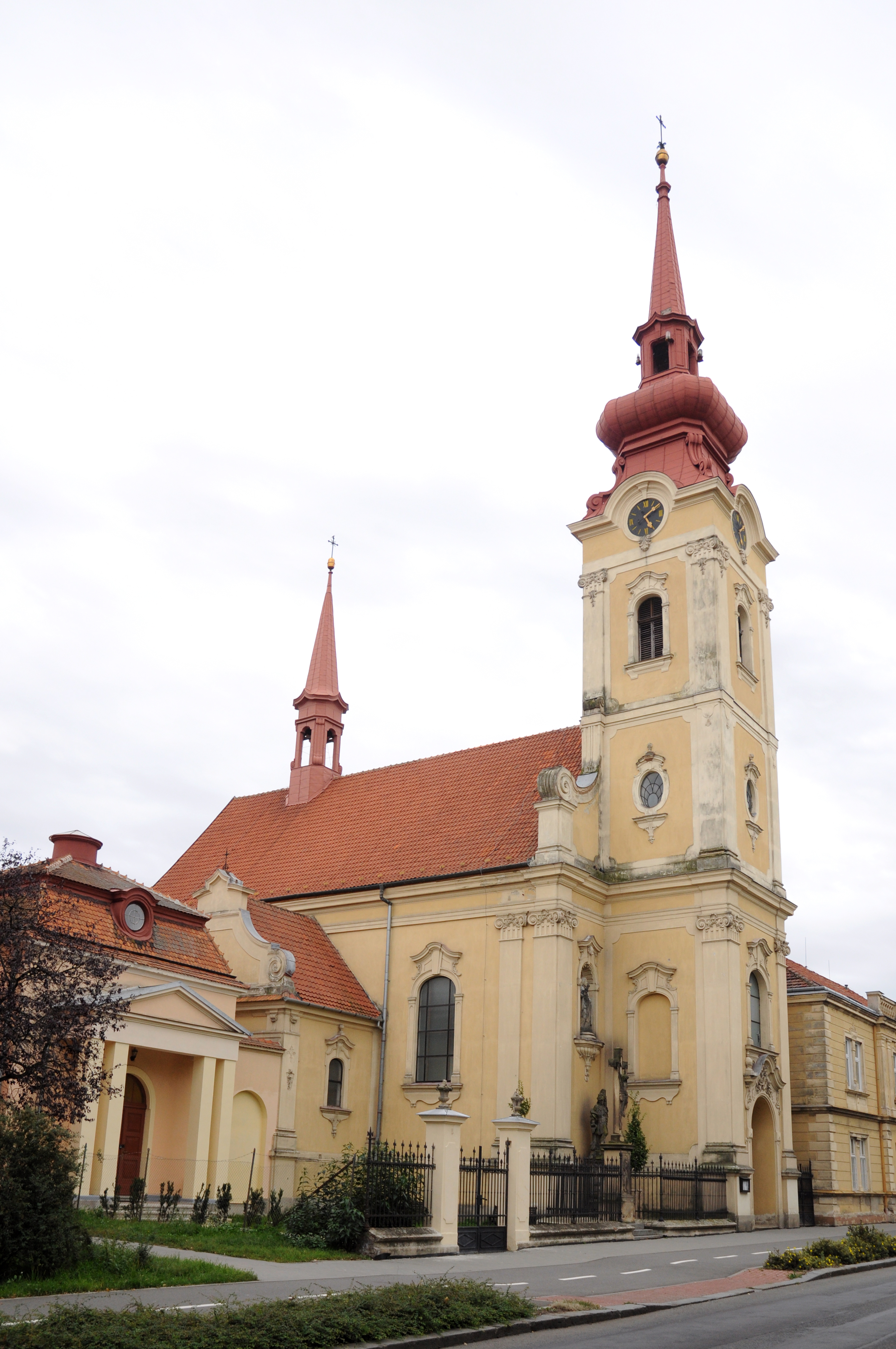
Church of Saints Cyril and Methodius

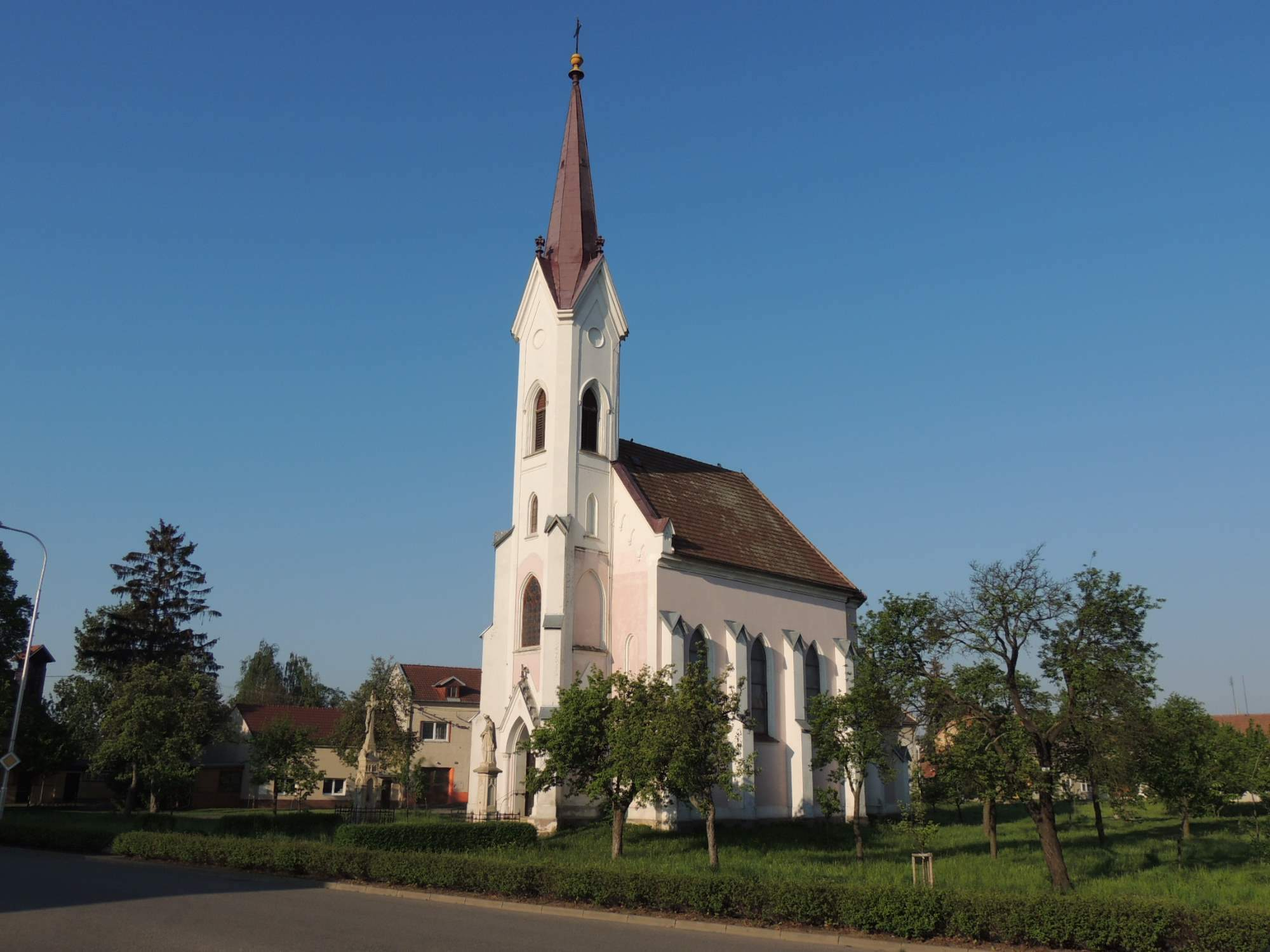
Church of St Joseph

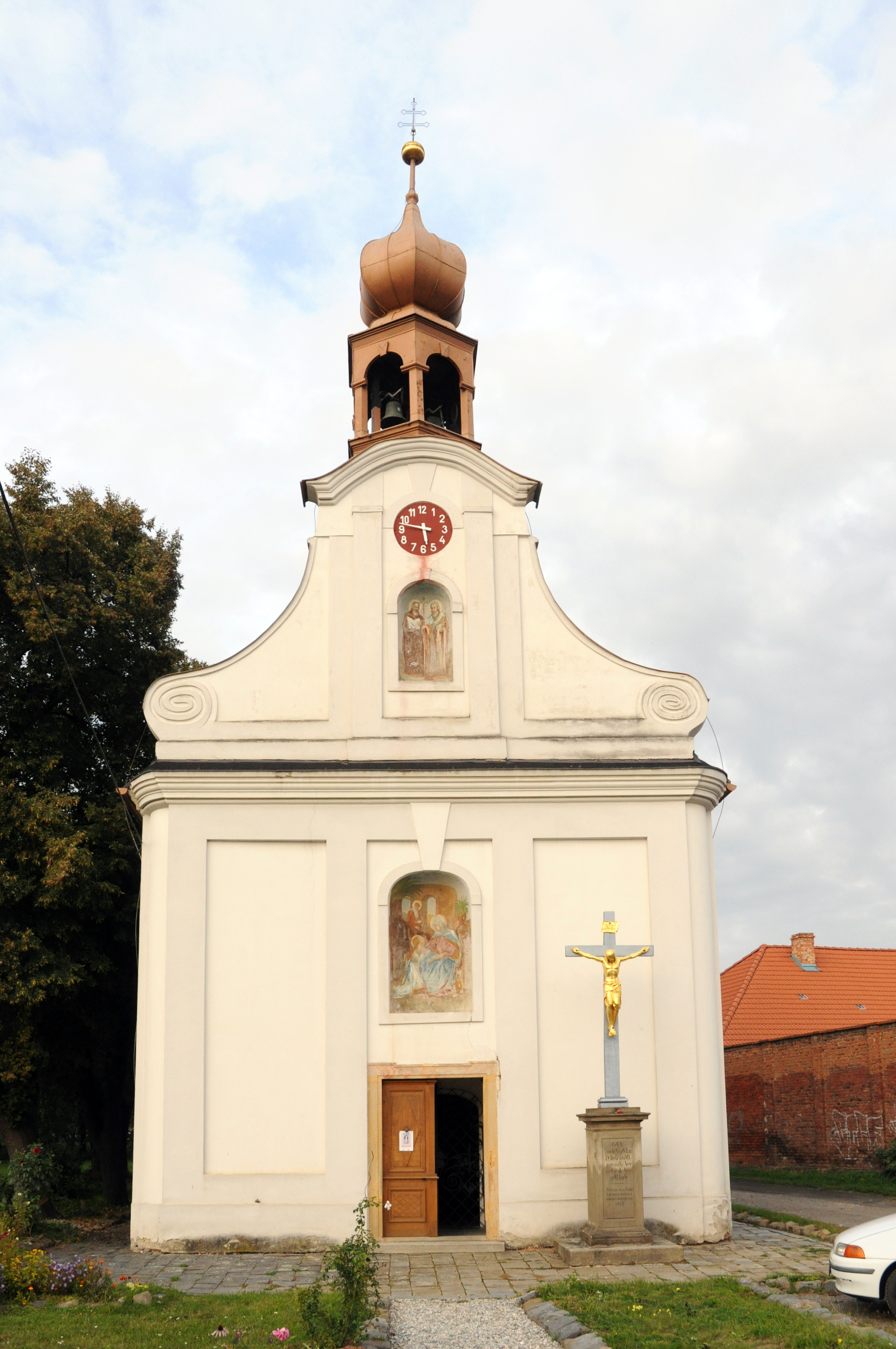
Chapel of St Anna

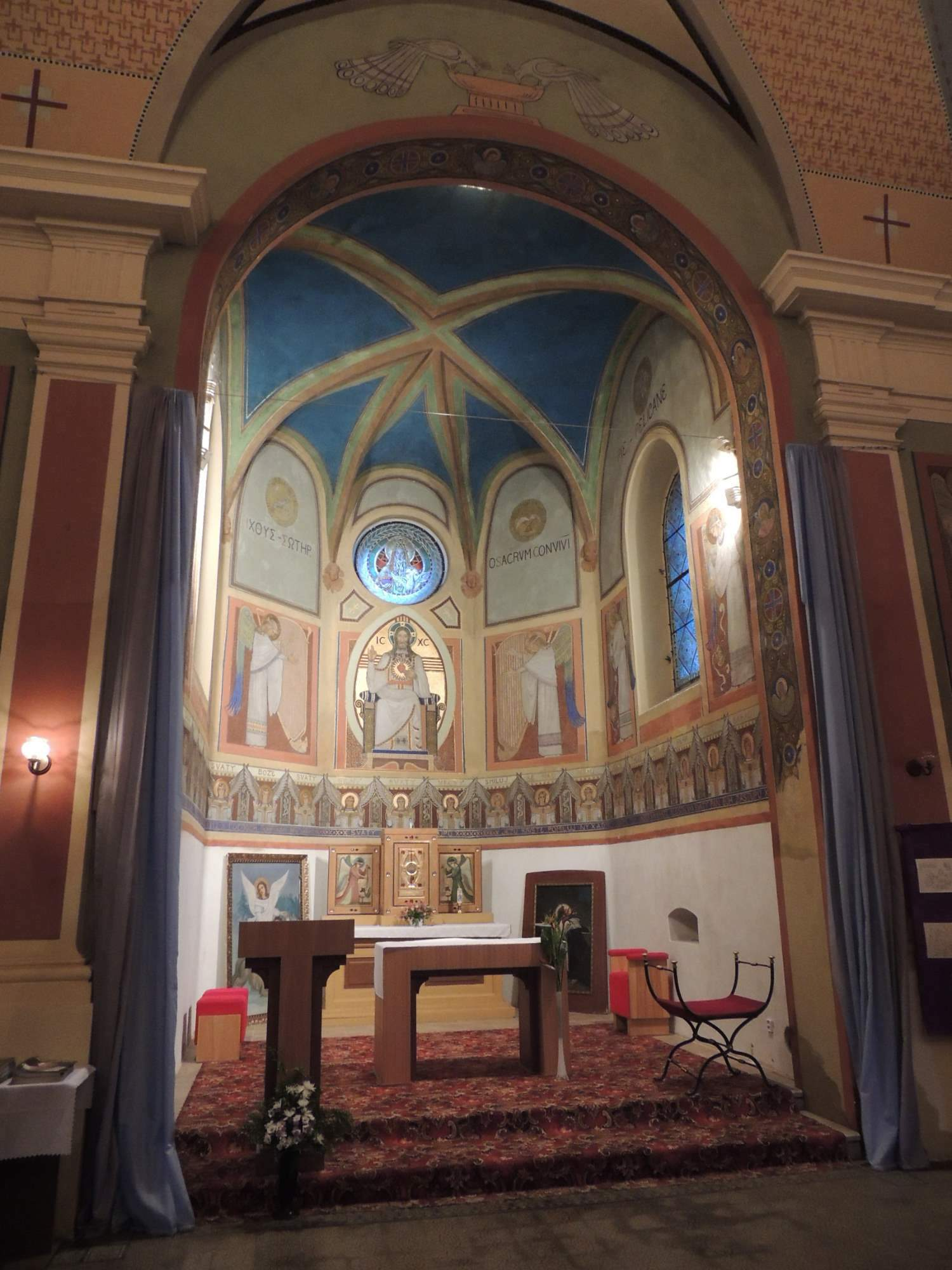
Holy Trinity Chapel
