= Eastside Community Center =

Historic church in Illinois, United States

- Holy Cross Church; Eastside Community Center
- U.S. National Register of Historic Places
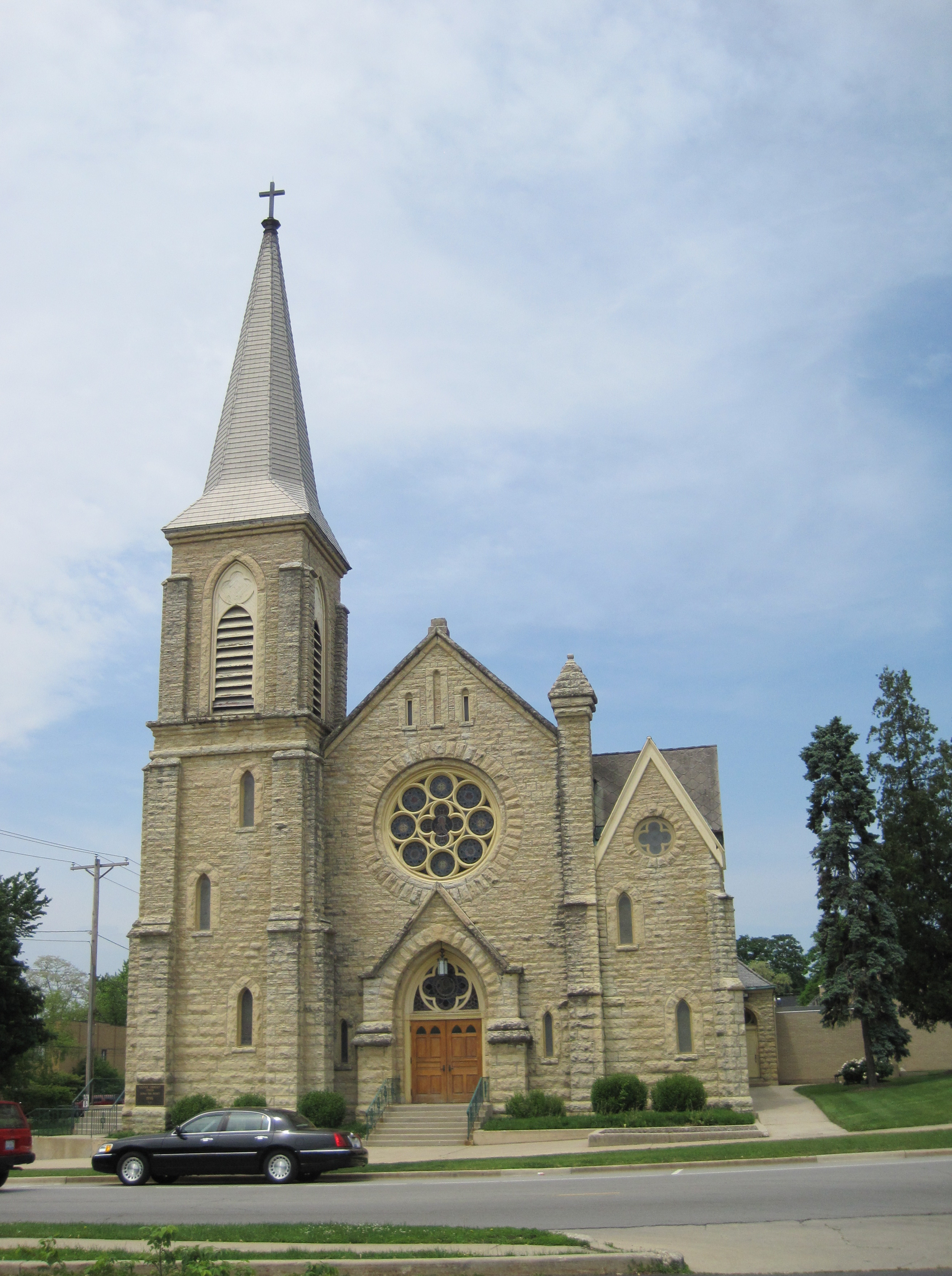
- Location: 14 North Van Buren Street; Batavia, Kane County, Illinois, United States
- Coordinates: 41°51′0.67″N 88°18′9.58″W
- Built: 1897
- Architectural style: Gothic Revival
- NRHP reference No.: 99000587
- Added to NRHP: May 20, 1999

The Eastside Community Center, formerly the Catholic Holy Cross Church, is an historic building in Batavia, Illinois. It was built in 1897 to serve the Holy Cross congregation of Batavia, many of whom were Irish immigrants who came to work in local quarries. The building operated as a church until the 1990s, when the property was transferred to the Batavia Park District. It was added to the National Register of Historic Places in 1999.

== History ==
Col. Joseph Lyon moved to the area now known as Batavia, Illinois in 1834. He built the first schoolhouse in Kane County, which also served as the first building for organized religion in the county. Starting in the 1840s, Batavia became a major source of limestone for the Chicago region. Batavia was largely a Methodist settlement, due to large numbers of Swedish immigrants who came to work in the quarries. The first Catholic services were held in private homes in 1854. Led by Father Sullivan, the followers were mostly Irish immigrants. The Catholics took over a vacant church building for their services in 1870 and became the Holy Cross congregation. As the congregation grew in the late 19th century, they decided to construct a new building.

Milo Kemp owned the piece of property on which the church was built. Fr. George Henry Rathz oversaw the construction of the Gothic Revival building. Construction was slowed due to the Panic of 1896 and was dedicated on June 15, 1897. Upon completion, the size of the congregation was 300 people. James William Shannon, a member of the church and owner of Shannon Quarry, donated the limestone for the project and functioned as the main builder. Due to large contributions from volunteers, the church only cost $12,000 to build.

A small, one-story schoolhouse was added to the lot in 1960. In the 1980s, the congregation again needed a larger building to serve its needs. They purchased a 14-acre (5.7 ha) site and built the church that is now known as Holy Cross Catholic Church at 2300 Main Street. On April 27, 1996, the old building was transferred to the Batavia Park District and serves as the assembly hall of the Eastside Community Center. A corridor was added between the former church and the schoolhouse to facilitate travel between the two buildings in their new capacity. The building was listed on the National Register of Historic Places on May 20, 1999.

The building is on a 165 by 264 foot (50 by 80 m) lot in a residential neighborhood three blocks east of the Fox River. The church itself is 58 by 78 feet (18 by 24 m) with an entrance facing the south. The nave is 48 by 58 feet (15 by 18 m) has been renamed Shannon Hall (for the builder). The north side of the building features a six-sided apse. The bell tower is in the southwest and rises 125 feet (38 m) with a steeply pitched gable. A 10 foot (3.0 m) window forms a quatrefoil surrounded with circles above the main door. The roof is covered with asbestos shingles.
