= Krty-Hradec =

- Municipality
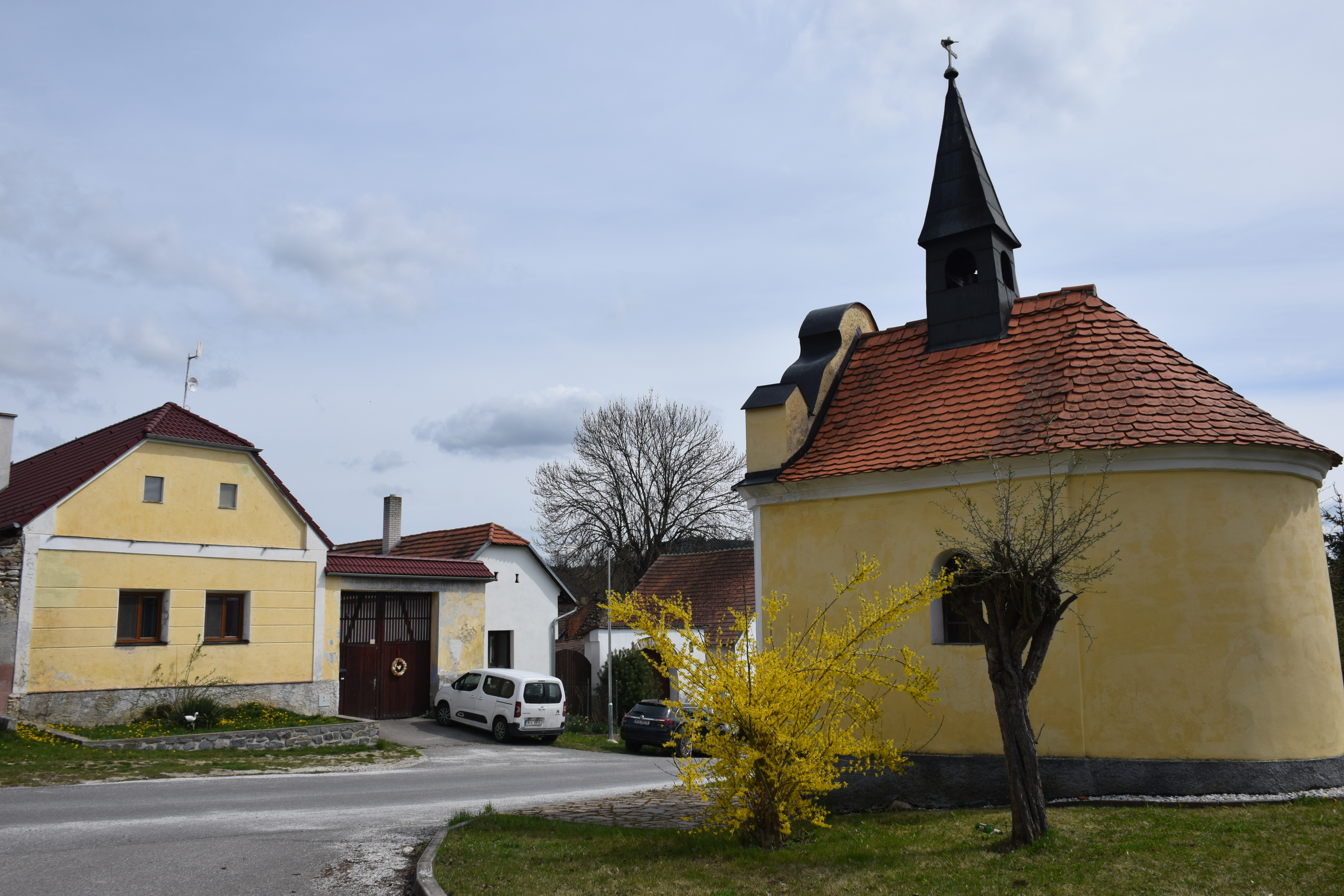
- Centre with chapel

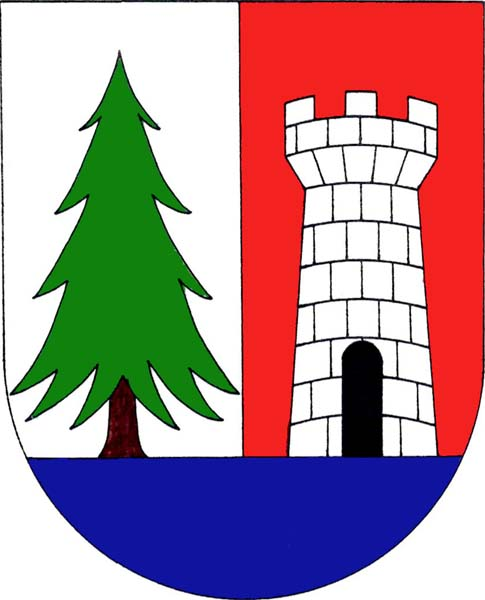
- Flag Coat of arms

- Location in the Czech Republic
- Coordinates: 49°17′29″N 13°50′53″E
- Country: Czech Republic
- Region: South Bohemian
- District: Strakonice
- First mentioned: 1227

Area
  - Total: 4.94 km^{2} (1.91 sq mi)
- Elevation: 431 m (1,414 ft)

Population (2026-01-01)
  - Total: 127
  - Density: 25.7/km^{2} (66.6/sq mi)
- Time zone: UTC+1 (CET)
  - Summer (DST): UTC+2 (CEST)
- Postal code: 387 11
- Website: krtyhradec.cz

Krty-Hradec is a municipality and village in Strakonice District in the South Bohemian Region of the Czech Republic. It has about 100 inhabitants.

Krty-Hradec lies approximately 6 kilometres (4 mi) north-west of Strakonice, 58 km (36 mi) north-west of České Budějovice, and 98 km (61 mi) south-west of Prague.

== Demographics ==
Historical population
Year	Pop.	±%
1869	379	—
1880	389	+2.6%
1890	363	−6.7%
1900	363	+0.0%
1910	329	−9.4%
1921	335	+1.8%
1930	330	−1.5%
1950	279	−15.5%
1961	255	−8.6%
1970	231	−9.4%
1980	195	−15.6%
1991	153	−21.5%
2001	129	−15.7%
2011	130	+0.8%
2021	133	+2.3%
Source: Censuses
