= Meduna =

Family name of Celtic origin

Meduna family timeline

Patriarchate of Aquileia
Republic of Venice (1420-1797)
Austria and Risorgimento
Ancestral lineage (castellans)
Pordenone branch
Venetian branch
Treviso-Castelcucco branch
Hungarian branch
Bohemian Crown branch
US and Brazilian branches

darker shades: historically recorded persons

Meduna is a toponymic surname of Celtic origin derived from the hydronym Meduna via the related toponym Meduna (di Livenza). It is first attested as the name of the homonymus river in a charter issued by Charlemagne in the year 794, and appears as a surname in the early 11th century in Italy and since the late 16th century in the Czech lands, from where it spread mainly to Austria, the United States and Brazil.

== Geographic distribution ==
As of 2014, 47% of all known bearers of the surname Meduna lived in Europe and 29% in the United States. The surname is most common in the Czech Republic, where it is held by 620 people (frequency 1:17,151). It is still predominant at the location of its 16th century origin in Chrudim (111 or 1:1,344) and Pardubice (57 or 1:3,369) districts. 13% live in the South Moravian Region, a key settlement area during the Habsburg Empire en route to today's territory of Austria. The surname reached Brazil from Europe mainly in the 19th and 20th centuries, where it has 167 occurrences.

== Notable people ==
Notable people with the surname include:

- Bartolomeo Meduna, Conventual Franciscan scholar and author;
- Giovanni Battista and Tommaso Meduna, Italian architect and engineer brothers;
- Johann Meduna von Riedburg, ennobled officer in the Austro-Hungarian Army;
- Bertha von Meduna, Baroness and Chamber Woman of Archduchess Sophie of Austria;
- József Meduna di Montecucco, award-winning Italian-Hungarian salami maker;
- Ladislas J. Meduna, Hungarian psychiatrist and neuropathologist;
- Johann Meduna, Austrian resistance fighter against the Nazi regime;
- Veronika Meduna, New Zealand biologist, science journalist and writer;
- Alexander Meduna, theoretical computer scientist and expert on compiler design;
- Michal Meduna, Czech footballer;
- Mathew Paul Meduna, ISEF awardee in 2003.

== Name and origin ==
=== Etymology ===
Various similar and related etymological proposals exist for the origin of the name, yet all agree on its Celtic foundations.

The second element -dun has been recognized as a continuation of the Celtic *dhūno- ('oppidum, fortified hill, castle'), in use among the Carni Gauls that penetrated and populated the region of current Veneto and Friuli between the 4th and 2nd centuries BC, possibly as part of the great Celtic migration towards Pannonia and the Balkan regions. The variety of Celtic toponyms and hydronyms in the Pre-Alps suggests that the culture may have resisted in the region from the 4th century BC until complete Latinisation during the imperial era. Some of these assumed Celtic or Celticised oppida in the region have been proposed as locations of subsequent castles in the Middle Ages, including the Castello di Meduno.

For the first element of the name, it has been proposed that it may be derived from either a Gaulish *mago ('great'), combnined into *Magodunum ('great/big fort'), or an Indo-European *medhu ('middle'), resulting in a Celto-Latin *Mediodunum ('in the middle of fortified heights'). Other scholars have suggested a compound *Mago-dunum ('fort on the plain') based on mago ('field'), as well as a Celto-Latin Medio-dunum ('that which stands or flows in the midst' of the hills/mountains) – the latter with clear reference to the river.

Such an etymological origin is also found, for example, in the historical Meduana flumen, the current Mayenne river in France, with a derivative morpheme. The hydronym of the French Mayenne river also produced the de Mayenne family name – in some sources also attested as de Meduana and de Meduno – which is, however, unrelated to the Meduna/Meduno surnames of Italian origin, beyond the shared Celtic etymological root. Another analogous toponym of Celtic origin is the name of the Istrian village of Motovun across the nearby Gulf of Trieste, derived from Montona, a 'town in the hills'.

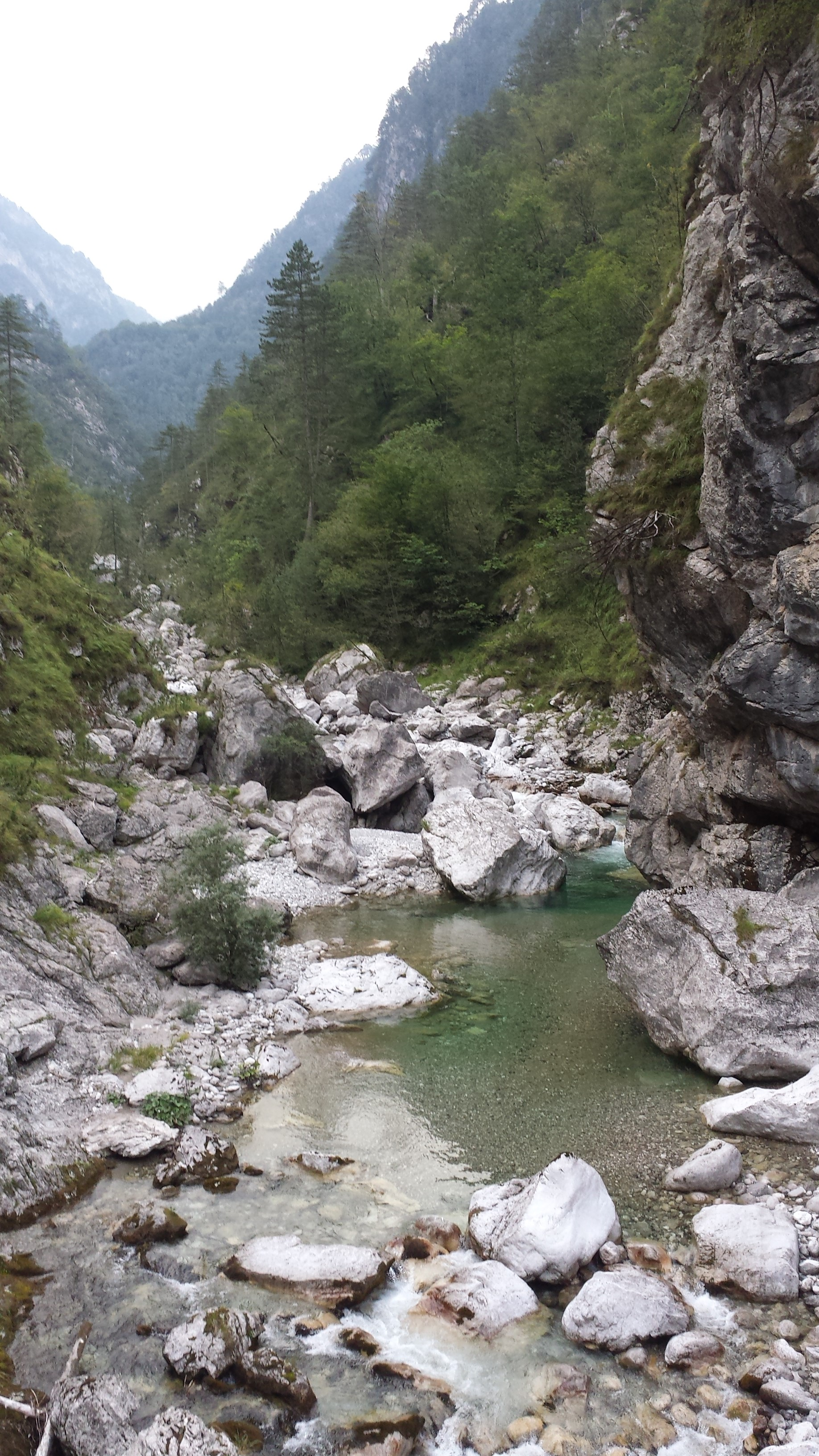
The Meduna river in its upper course.

The hypothesis and interpretation of the river Meduna being "in between mountains" is based on the fact that the torrent has its source in the Carnic Pre-Alps and generates two related town names along its course: Meduno, at its downstream outlet in the high plain, and Meduna as it flows into the Livenza river. On the upper course of the stream, there are also three villages called Tramonti (Tramonti di Sopra, Tramonti di Mezzo, Tramonti di Sotto), which would constitute a direct and proper translation of the Celtic counterpart, transmitted through Latin and Friulian (attested as Tramonz in 1182) into Italian, thus making it a linguistic synonym of the word Meduna/Meduno. However, this proposal has been contested since the second part of the hydronym/toponym Meduna/Meduno (-dun) does not have a generic meaning of "mountains" and the Latin appelative mons/montes has not inherited a second semantic value of "castle/castles" in Romance dialects.

A different etymological approach is based on the frequent hydronymic and oronymic transposition of theonyms in the Celtic cultural environment, thus assigning rivers and geographical features names of deities. An inscription from the Rhineland contains a dedication to the goddess Meduna, venerated by the local Celtic tribe of the Treveri. The small consecration altar (from Roman times) found in Bad Bertrich near a hot spring associates the goddess with the source of water. Another town in the vicinity of nearby Trier, Mettendorf (according to other sources nearby Möhn), traces its name back to the locality of Villa Medona recorded in the year 768. In Insular Celtic mythology, there is mention of a goddess Medb or Maeve (in Ireland) and Mèadh (in Wales) – based on which a Celtic theonym *Medwa (as warrior goddess) has been proposed as a basis for *Medw-una, therefore dedicating the Friulan river to a Celtic deity.

While linguistic traits were shared across the ancient Celtic tribes, a cult of any of these particular deities among the Gallic tribes of the eastern Alps has not been attested. Finally, other sources propose that the name can be derived from an ancient proper name Metonius or another Celtic divinity attested in insular Britain, Matun(i)us.

Localities of similar names of distinct origins include the settlement of Medun in Montenegro, the village of Medana in Slovenia, or the town of Modugno in Apulia, first mentioned as “de loco Medunio” in 1021 and deriving its toponym from the Latin Medunium ('in the middle' of Bitonto and Bari).

=== Earliest attestations ===
In the year 794, twenty years after Charlemagne defeated Desiderius, the last king of the Lombards, and established the March of Friuli under Frankish dominance, we find the rivers Meduna and Livenza documented for the first time in a charter issued by Charlemagne (“et post hunc fluvium Medunae et aqua Medunae defluit in Liquentiam”) – six years before his coronation as Emperor of the Romans.

Ten years later, in 804, a charter settling property ownership between two clerics attests the locality of Matunianus, which is believed to be today's town of Meduna di Livenza. The charter is stored in the Archivio di Stato in Verona (Ospedale Civico, roll 5[A]).

The hydronym Meduna proper is further attested in the year 996 in a charter issued by Holy Roman Emperor Otto III – again, as the confluence of the Meduna and Livenza rivers (“et aqua Meduna fluit in Liquencia”).

=== Meduna and Meduno ===
The hydronym Meduna (La Midùna in Friulian) is grammatically feminine, which is a common trait of large rivers in both Friulian popular tradition as well as rustic dialects of Treviso and Belluno. In contrast, the town name of Meduno (Midun in Friulian) is grammatically masculine. It remains impossible to ascertain the temporal precedence of the two names. Some authors, however, suggest that the masculine name was originally applied to the entire area wedged between the mountains (Val Tramontina and Val Meduna), subsequently passed to the torrent and made feminine (as in numerous Friulian and Venetian cases) and only in more recent (post-Roman) times applied as a carryover toponym to the castle and town of Meduna – thus giving rise to Meduna as a surname from the 11th century onwards. The separate noble family of Meduno, similarly, is attested since the early 12th century until their extinction in 1514.

Italian and Latin historical records of the 10th to 17th centuries show a range of variations in notation of both names. Meduno appears as Medun, Medunium, Methun, Metuno, Metunium, Mituno, Midun, Midunum, Miduno and Midhuna [sic!]. Similarly, the name Meduna can often be found in records as Metuna (mostly in Latin), Methuna, or Mettuna, Miduna.

== Patriarchate of Aquileia ==
The recorded history of the Meduna family begins with the advent of the High Middle Ages in the territory of the March of Treviso.

=== Castello di Meduna ===
The castle of Meduna was built around the year 1000 on the initiative of the Patriarchs of Aquileia, probably on the foundations of a fortress that was several centuries older. The castle is considered as part of fortifications erected in response to the Hungarian raids of the preceding decades. When the castle was built, a branch of the Meduna river, after having collected the waters of the Fiume and the Sile, ran into the bed of the Sambellino. In this way the castle of Meduna was located between two large rivers: the Meduna and the Livenza.

1563 map of Friuli showing the location of the Meduna (Miduna) castle

The current palazzo del governo of “La Meduna” (or simply "Meduna", as the town was called until 1 September 1884, when the denomination “di Livenza” was formally adopted by royal decree n. 2578) is a fusion of what remains of the ancient castle with the palace of the Venetian Patricians Michiel dalla Meduna, built towards the end of the 16th century. Bartolomeo Meduna is also mentioned as "reconstructor" of the castle. The remains of the medieval castle are located on the south-east side, distinguished by the sawtooth cornice under the roof and by a series of windows with a Romanesque arch from the era.

Meduna was a fief of the Patriarchs of Aquileia who gave it as investiture to the Lords of Meduna and then to feudal lords. In 1204, the Municipality of Meduna entered the Parliament of Udine. The first document that explicitly mentions the castle of Meduna dates back to 1223. Other documents of the same year mention the Patriarch's house in Meduna and the church. The jurisdiction of Meduna (Methuna) in the thirteenth century included, among other, a locality listed as “Methuna la villa”.

Being a residential fiefdom and a gastaldia, the castle at Meduna was the seat of the feudal government, the residence of the feudal lord, it depended directly on the Patriarch and was administered by a patriarchal official called a gastaldo.

=== Meduna ancestral lineage ===
Shortly after the year 1000, the first noble family that was invested by the Patriarch of Aquileia with the fief settled in the castle. In accordance with the custom of the time, the family took its name from the land / the castle itself and was henceforth called “di Meduna”. The family, which belonged to the class of noble feudal lords of the church of Aquileia, was represented in the Friulian Parliament. Medieval chronicles sporadically mention members of the family since their adoption of the name.

The investiture of the fief continued to be renewed over the next centuries. Patriarch Bertoldo, as his predecessors, had granted the castle as a fief of residence to the homonymous family. Only when Gena di Meduna died without direct heirs, on 29 May 1289 the Patriarch Raimondo della Torre invested his relatives, the two brothers Emberaldo and Gabrio della Torre, with the fief.

Other branches of the family continued, and by the 14th century the Meduna family were the castellans once again. In 1326 the Meduna nobles made an agreement with the lords of Panigai and tried to sell the castle to the lord of the Treviso area, Rizzardo da Camino – who already owned Motta and had particular aims on Meduna throughout his life. However, the conspiracy was discovered and, guilty of felony, the conspirators (Floramonte, Lavinio, Varnero and Nicolò di Meduna) were banished by the Patriarch in 1327.

In a violent act of vendetta, the banished Meduna nobles, supported by the Caminesi, attacked the town of Meduna itself, causing considerable damage. The riots also affected neighbouring villages. The Meduna were later pardoned by the Patriarch but were no longer granted their ancient fiefdom.

==== Historical mentions ====
In different historical sources the prepositions in front of the name – di, da, della, de la, and de (in Latin versions) – were often used interchangeably in relation to the same person. Titles such as D. (Don, Dominus) or Nob. (Nobile, Noble) mentioned in chronicles are omitted in the below lists (chronological, unless preceded by lineal descent).

The following is a list of members of the Meduna family mentioned in historical records (until the end of the Patriarchate of Aquilea in 1420):

Year	Name	Alternative spelling	Details	Sources
1190	Henricus Vice Dominus de Meduna			
1219-1223	Varnerio di Meduna	Varnero, Warnerio, Warniero, Wernero		
1219-1223	Osalio di Meduna			
1223	Odolricus de Meduna		faber (smith, architect)	
1223	Seraphinus de Meduna		son of Odolricus	
1223	Barnabas de Meduna			
1223	Bosellus de Meduna		presbyter	
1246	Tosco della Meduna			
1248	Folchomarius de Meduna	Folcomarius, Falcomario della Meduna		
	Pergulinus de Meduna			
1274-1284	Ramillus de Meduna	Ramillo, Ramello, Ramellus, Ramuello di Meduna	son of Pergulinus, feudal lord of the Church of Aquileia, 'ministeriale patriarcale di Meduna', had a fief of five and a half manors in Meduna	
1274	Isnardus de Meduna			
1274	Jacobus Tempesta de Meduna		son of the late Isnardus, had a feudal manor in Basedo, Chions	
1278	Marinus de Meduna	Mariano di Meduna	feudal lord of Meduna	
1289	Gena di Meduna		invested with the fief of Meduna, died without heirs	
1292	Bosello di Meduna		granted a residential fief in Cividale on 6 March 1292	
c. 1292, 1314	Valentinus de Meduna	Valens		
c. 1292, 1314	Folchomarius de Meduna	Falcomario		
1295	Artichus de Meduna			
1295	Johannes Thomasius de Meduna		son of the late Artichus, had a fief of two and a half manors in Meduna	
1295-1330	Morandus di Meduna	Morando	'gastaldio Medunae', married to Galliana di Pinzano, had a fief of manors in and around Meduna	
1296-1335	Floriamontus di Meduna	Floramonte, Florimonte, Floramando, Florianus, Floriano	imperial notary, banished by the Patriarch of Aquileia in 1327 (along with Lavinio, Varnero, and Nicolaus) after their rebellion	
1335-1343	Anthonius de Meduna	Antonius, Antonio, della Meduna	notary, son of Floriamontus	
c. 1300	Meynardus de Meduna	Meynhardo		
c. 1300	Insindricus de Meduna			
1295-1325	Martinus de Meduna	Martino, Mastinus, Mastino de Miduna	brothers, had a fief of eight manors in Azzano [and more in other towns]	
1295-1325	Saracinus de Meduna	Saracino	brothers, had a fief of eight manors in Azzano [and more in other towns]	
1305	Franciscus de Meduna			
1308	Valmotus de Meduna	Welmotus		
1308- 338	Vermeglus di Meduna	Vermeglio, Vermiglio, Vermilio, Virmileo, Vernilio della / de Meduna	'gastaldio di Meduna', received gastaldia of S. Vito on 5 December 1338, died in Meduna	
1351	Nicoletto di Meduna		son of the late Vermeglus	
1317	Guinetto di Meduna		'gastaldio di Aviano'	
1318-1357	Domenico di Meduna	da Meduna	captured and released on bail on 20 August 1318	
1357	Grazia da Meduna		widow (daughter?) of the late Domenico	
1320-1396	Zanthomasius de Meduna	Zantomasso di Meduna		
1321	Leonino di Meduna	de la Meduna	notary	
1327	Lavinio di Meduna		banished by the Patriarch of Aquileia in 1327 (along with Floriamontus and Nicolaus) after their rebellion	
1327	Varnero di Meduna		banished by the Patriarch of Aquileia in 1327 (along with Floriamontus and Nicolaus) after their rebellion	
1328	Rizzardo di Meduna			
1328	Marquardo di Meduna		son of Rizzardo	
1328	Lauro da Meduna	della Meduna		
1330	Moreto di Meduna	Moretto, Morotto de la Meduna, de Methuna		
1330	Nicolaus di Meduna	Nicolò, de la Meduna, de Methuna	son of Moreto, banished by the Patriarch of Aquileia in 1327 (along with Lavinio, Varnero and Floriamontus) after their rebellion	
1365	Jacobus de Meduna		member of the Parliament of Friuli	
1336-1357	Bianchino di Meduna	da Meduna	son of Francesco straçolinus, received feudal investiture on 27 October 1336	
1339	Tolberto di Meduna		received feudal investiture on 2 January 1339	
1359-1369	Comutinus della Meduna	Comuzio	Vicedominus	
1359	Morettino della Meduna			
1360	Leonardo di Meduna		received feudal investiture of Meduna on 7 May 1360	
1360	Ottussio di Meduna		received feudal investiture of Meduna on 7 May 1360	
1360-1370	Thomassius de Meduna	Thomasinus, Thomasius		
1360-1370	Nicolussius de Meduna	Nicolusius	son of Thomassius, notary in San Daniele	
1369	Moretto de Meduna			
1369-1398	Johannes de Meduna	Giovanni	son of Moretto, received feudal investiture in Portgruaro on 12 July 1382, capitano of Gemona in 1398	
1355-1365	Iohannes de Meduna	Giovanni da Meduna	Venice, parish of Saint Antoninus	
1355-1365	Mina de Meduna		widow of Iohannes	
1392	Donna Abbondanza		daughter of the late Giovanni da Meduna	
1368-1374	Pietro Sartore della Meduna	Petro, de la Meduna	teacher, rector of the grammar schools of Portogruaro	
1368-1374	Artico di Meduna		friar, prior of the hospital of S. Leonardo di Sacile	
1378	Martinus de Metuna			
1378	Grigorius de Metuna		son of Martinus, witness in Valvasone	
1385	Giovanni Leone di Meduna			
1385	Vermillino di Meduna			

=== Castello di Meduno ===
The castle of Meduno (Medun) was erected in 1136 under the jurisdiction and upon the wishes of the Bishop of Concordia on its homonymous hill. The name of the castle is attested in 1136 as "Medunum castrum", in a bull of Pope Urban III dated 1186 as "castellum de Meduno cum villa", and in 1191 as "gastaldia de Medurico (…) castro et villa Medunii" (with "Medurico" having been identified in the literature as a manurscript mistake).

Castello di Meduno ruins

Having been damaged by an earthquake in 1776, the castle was abandoned, and its square stones were used as building material in the nearby village, including the parish church and its bell tower as well as surrounding houses.

The current town Meduno developed at the foot of the castle and is one of the oldest centres in the mountain and foothills area. Yet geographically and juridically the elevated Castello di Medun(o) and the Vila de Medun below remained distinct urban structures. As with the castello di Meduna and the town of Meduna (di Livenza) further downstream, the toponym of Meduno is related to the river connecting both castles.

=== Meduno ancestral lineage ===
The custody of the castle was entrusted to a ministerial family or dinestemanni – a Germanic term in the oldest available documents. The entrusted nobles, the Counts of Meduno, who lived in the castle and ruled it on behalf of the diocesan Church, were vassals of the emperor of the Holy Roman Empire of German Nation and of the Church of Concordia. As such, the family was never present in the parliament, where the Bishop had representation for all his castles. However, they had to pay the See a war bounty.

In 1312, it is documented that the castellans of Meduno were freed by the Bishop of Concordia from the "ignoble ministry of catching and arresting the thieves" they were bound by the debt of their fiefdom. They achieved this through the eloquence of their associate Thomas, thus erasing this stain from the house of Meduno.

The lords of Meduno had the right to install the Bishops of Concordia (1318: “The horse [palfrey] of the bishop of Concordia is due to the lords of Meduno on the day of his death, because they are the ones who place him in the bishopric”).

In 1318, the counts of Meduno fought a violent war to gain primacy over the rival Maniaco (Maniago) family. A year later, Walterus, Thomasius and Franciscus di Meduno made peace with the lords of Maniaco.

In 1363, the castle suffered considerable damage after being attacked by the lords of Spilimbergo, Strassoldo, Prata, Polcenigo and Urusbergo, who had sided with Rudolph, Duke of Austria, against Patriarch Lodovico della Torre. During the bitter conflicts which beleaguered Friuli under Patriarchal rule, the lords of Meduno frequently took the side of the counts of Cividale.

In the 1380s, the nobles of Meduno unsuccessfully sided with the Udinesi against Patriarch Philip of Alençon and Lord of Padua Francesco da Carrara, heralding their gradual decline and division within the family: Giovanni, son of Odorico di Meduno, along with his brothers and associates, rebelled and killed Giacomuzzo and Tomasutto di Meduno. In 1389 the Bishop forcefully took possession of the castle, while Giovanni resorted to an alliance with Cividale, obtaining 300 gold ducats from the community in 1392.

Passed as investiture for 700 gold ducats to the Valentinis family in 1413 by the Bishop of Concordia Enrico di Strassoldo, through a series of alliances and acquisitions the castle returned to the counts of Meduno: On 13 December 1448, Bishop Battista dal Legname once again conferred the investiture of the castle and subject lands and villas to the lords of Meduno – Nicolò, son of Candido, and Antonio, son of Gaspare – for 1300 gold ducats. The family also received the privilege of jurisdiction of the entire lordship in times of vacancy of the See. The castle remained, albeit between various events, in the possession of the Meduno family until 15 September 1514 when the last lord of Medun, Melchiore di Meduno, assigned all assets and rights to his adopted sister's son, Vincenzo Furlano, son of Piero Antonio de Colossis of S. Vito, marking the extinction of the di Meduno lineage and subsequent transfer of the territory under direct administration by the Republic of Venice.

==== Historical mentions ====
The following is a list of members of the Meduno family mentioned in historical records (until extinction):

Year	Name	Alternative spelling	Details	Sources
1136	Wodalricus de Medun	Ulrich		
1136, 1146	Gerungus de Meduno	Gerung, Gerunc de Midhuna	Aquileia	
1140	Hermanus de Meduno	Ermanno di Meduno	witnessed the foundation deed of the municipality of Portogruaro	
1186	Thomas de Meduno			
1186	Francisco de Meduno			
1186	Moreto de Meduno			
1186	Jacobo de Meduno			
1189	Enricus de Medunio	Enrico		
1191	Sifredus de Meduno			
1210	Artuicus de Meduno	Artico		
1220	Corrado di Meduno			
1278	Paulo de Meduno			
1295	Varnerius de Metuno	Warnerio di Medun		
1280-1295	Tommaso di Medun		son of Varnerius; married to Elisa, daughter of Sivrido di Toppo	
1280-1295	Romilda di Meduno		married to Brisino di Toppo	
1293	Hermannus de Miduno	Ermano di Meduno, Ermanno da Meduno		
1295-1323	Matheus de Miduno	Matheo	presbyter	
1295-1355	Odorico di Meduno	de Miduno		
14th century	Florissa de Meduno			
1303	Syuridus dictus Boça de Miduno			
1303	Bratus de Miduno			
1303	Jacobus Germanii de Miduno			
1303	Walteraia de Miduno			
1317-1319	Conradus de Miduno		presbyter	
1318	Andrea de Miduno		sons of the late Hermannus de Miduno; with Articus and Thomasuttus, noble lords of Meduno	
1318-1343	Franciscus de Miduno	Francischus de Metuno, Francesco	sons of the late Hermannus de Miduno; with Articus and Thomasuttus, noble lords of Meduno	
1314-1323	Sacerdotus de Miduno			
1314-1323	Dominicus de Miduno		son of Sacerdotus; imprisoned by the bishop of Concordia Articus da Castello (1318–1331) and kept in custody by Thomasius de Miduno	
1314-1323	Articus de Miduno	Artico	with Franciscus and Thomasuttus, noble lords of Meduno	
1318-1343	Thomasuttus de Miduno	Tomasutto, de Metuno	son of the late Varnerius; with Franciscus and Articus, noble lords of Meduno (who in 1318 had a dispute with the Cordovado family regarding their rights to the palfrey of the bishop of Concordia)	
1314-1339	Articonus de Miduno	Artichonus, Articone da Meduno, Articon di Meduno, di Medun	'gastaldio'; in 1318 bought a red-coated horse for four marches and forty Aquileian denarii in the presence of Franciscuttus, son of Thomasius de Miduno, in front of the tavern of Vivanius de Miduno	
1353-1377	Giacomo di Medun		son of Articonus, capitano of Solimbergo	
1377	Iacobo di Meduno		son of Articonus	
1377	Filippa di Meduno		wife of Iacobo	
1377	Daniele di Meduno		heirs and children of Iacobo	
1377	Bortolo di Meduno		heirs and children of Iacobo	
1377	Odorico di Meduno		heirs and children of Iacobo	
1377	Articone Giacomo Benvenuta di Meduno		heirs and children of Iacobo	
1377	Maddalena di Meduno		heirs and children of Iacobo	
1319-1331	Walterius dictus Misotus de Meduno	Vualterius, Walterus, Waltero di Meduno	with Franciscus and Thomasius, made peace with the lords of Maniaco in 1319.	
	Francesco da Meduno	Francesco (di) Misotto da Meduno	son of Misotto, trusted advisor of Patriarch Bertrando	
1318-1319, 1339	Thomasius de Miduno	Tommaso, Thomas, de Meduno	with Franciscus and Walterius, made peace with the lords of Maniaco in 1319. 'D.nus Thomas de Castro Meduni'; he pledged to keep Domenicus de Miduno in custody after the latter was imprisoned by the bishop of Concordia Articus da Castello (1318–1331)	
1314-1323	Franciscuttus de Miduno		sons of Thomasius	
1337	Andrea da Medun		sons of Thomasius	
1354	Stefano di Medun		sons of Thomasius	
1339	Alexander de Meduno			
1343	Marquardo di Meduno	Marquardus de Meduno	presbyter, appointed by the Patriarch as chaplain of the church of Santa Maria in Castel d'Aviano, diocese of Concordia	
1357	Gregorio di Meduno		received feudal investiture in Udine on 29 November 1357	
1367	Nicolò da Meduno		notary	
1318-1319, 1377	Vivianus Malis de Meduno	Vivyanus, Vivianus, Viviano Malis, da Meduno, de Miduno	iuratus, owned a tavern and garden in Meduno in 1318-1319	
1377	Guido Malis da Meduno			
1382	G[...] di Meduno		invested by Patriarch Philip of Alençon with two feudal fields in Orcignoco (Orcenico), already owned by his father and deceased uncles	
1382	Zanino da Meduno			
1382	Corrado da Meduno		son of Zanino da Meduno, servant of Daniele son of the noble Odorico di Pinzano, resident of Spilimbergo; received from Daniele in donation the altar of the church of S. Maria di Aquileia, thus freeing him from the yoke of servitude	
1386	Henricus comare de Meduno			
1387	Jacomuzzo di Meduno		“treacherously killed by their other Consorts; buried in the Church of S. Martino near the Castle of Meduno” (wrapped in sheepskin according to custom)	
1387	Tomasutto di Meduno		“treacherously killed by their other Consorts; buried in the Church of S. Martino near the Castle of Meduno” (wrapped in sheepskin according to custom)	
1391-1392	Giovanni di Meduno	'il piccolo'	son of Odorico (see 1377), killed Jacomuzzo and Tomasutto	
1398-99	Zuan di Medun			
1402	Vualter de Meduno			
1402	Andrea de Meduno		son of Vualter	
1406	Gio di Meduno			
1406	Candido di Meduno		son of Gio	
1406	Sara di Meduno		wife of Candido	
c. 1420	Iacomucio di Meduno			
c. 1420	Dorotea di Meduno		daughter of Iacomucio	
1438-1448	Nicolò di Medun	Nicolao	son of Candido	
1438-1448	Gaspare di Medun			
1448-1487	Antonio di Medun	di Meduno	son of Gaspare, priest, 'ab immanissimis Turcis abductus est' (abducted by Turks)	
1475	Culissino da Meduno			
1475	Donna Sulana da Meduno		daughter of the late Culissino da Meduno, resident of Spilimbergo; owned the hospital of S. Giovanni and land in the appurtenances of Sequals	
1485	Nicolò da Meduno		rector in Coseano	
1489	Petrus Faba di Meduno			
	Francesco di Medun		son of Antonio	
1514†	Melchiore di Meduno		son of Antonio, the last lord of Medun, adopted his nephew Vincenzo Colossis of S. Vito, marking the extinction of the di Meduno lineage	

== Serenissima to Risorgimento ==
During the Late Middle Ages and before the 15th century, the Meduna family had left the castle and fiefdom of their surname and settled in localities within the region, including in Pordenone and Treviso, while a branch still continued to live in Meduna in the 15th century. The community retained a seat in the parliament.

The original prepositions of the noble ancestral lineage of the di Meduna family have been increasingly abandoned over time, simply replaced by the surname Meduna, and occasionally supplemented by the place of residence (e.g. Meduna di/della Motta, Meduna di Pordenone).

=== Feudal investiture of Meduna ===
After the Venetian conquest of Friuli and the end of the Patriarchate of Aquilea in 1420, the gastaldia of Meduna was confiscated by the tax authorities and became subject to the Republic of Venice (the “Serenissima”) on 29 May 1420, which subsequently reassigned it to varoious capitani from other noble families for administration.

During the rule of the Venetian Republic in Friuli, noble families invested (as capitani, per carati) with the jurisdiction of the castle and community of Meduna, would often attach a toponymic predicate of (conti, signori, or consignori) di/dalla Meduna to their name and adopt and integrate heraldic elements of Meduna in their respective coats of arms.

For example, on 22 May 1455, Meduna was assigned to the patrician Michiel family of Venice – henceforth called Michiel dalla Meduna, which (unlike the earlier patriarchal stewards) maintained control of the fiefdom through inheritance until around 1700.

Families that were invested with the jurisdiction of the castello and the gastaldia of Meduna include the following:

- Alberghetti
- Albrizzi
- Avanzo
- Bellan
- Bettini
- Bondenti
- Burlina
- Buzzacarini
- Chiandusso
- Cigolotti
- Cittadella (Vigodarzere)
- Conducini
- Domini (di Orcenigo)
- Duolo
- (H)Erbassica (Barbasecca)
- Fabris
- Fanzago
- Franzani
- Girardi
- Grimaldi
- Lechi
- Locatello (Locatelli)
- Lorando
- Matiuzzi
- Michiel
- Pelizzari
- Perocco
- Pinali
- Provaglio
- Salvi
- Scanagatti
- Simonini (di Udine)
- Zanella
- Zoppola

These families are not to be confused with the original (di) Meduna family that carries the toponym as their surname and established various branches descending from the ancestral lineage.

=== Pordenone branch ===
In the 15th century, some members of the Meduna family had moved north from their ancestral feud and became one of the most prominent and historically most recorded branches of the Meduna family under the Venetian Republic. They were the noble Meduna di Pordenone – established in this town since around 1500, they owned a palazzo at today's Corso Vittorio Emanuele II n. 17, the altar of S. Maria, a sepulchre, and several tombstones at the Cathedral of San Marco, as well as a seat in the city council of Pordenone. In the 16th century, this branch was still linked to properties in the ancestral feud of Meduna.

Many men of this branch were members of the clergy (as well as Franciscans of the Order of Friars Minor Conventual) during the 16th and 17th centuries – including the Reformation period, which quickly collapsed in Italy at the beginning of the 17th century.

During the trial of Claudio Rorario in 1591, Giovanni Battista Meduna of Pordenone, who associated closely with the Mantica and the Rorario families, testified before the Inquisition as a witness about the Mantica-Rorario heretical circle. The Mantica and Rorario families both also had their palazzos at Corso Vittorio Emanuele II.

The presence of members of the Meduna family in Motta di Livenza (e.g. Bartolomeo Meduna) and Udine (e.g. Stefano Meduna) is directly linked to the Pordenone branch. The Pordenone branch is reported to have died out at the end of the 1600s, although individuals with noble titles and the name Meduna are recorded in Pordenone still in the 18th century.

==== Historical mentions ====
The following is a list of members of the Pordenone branch of the Meduna family mentioned in historical records:

Year	Name	Alternative spelling	Details	Sources
	Dominicus Metuna de Portunaone			
1528	Herminius Metuna de Portunaone	Erminio Meduna di Pordenone	son of Dominicus	
1541	Matteo della Meduna	Maphei, della Meduna da Bergamo, Matteo di Bergamo	son of Domenico della Meduna, cleric, takes possession of the chapel of Santa Maria in the church of San Marco in Pordenone	
1556-1560	Defendente della Meduna	a Meduna, da Meduna	son(s) of Matteo, Alessandro was the guardian of his nephews Giovanni Battista, Matteo and Giovanni Maria, the sons of his brother Giovanni Antonio, see tombstone	
1517-1560	Alessandro della Meduna	a Meduna, da Meduna	son(s) of Matteo, Alessandro was the guardian of his nephews Giovanni Battista, Matteo and Giovanni Maria, the sons of his brother Giovanni Antonio, see tombstone	
(1602)	Maria della Meduna		daughter of Alessandro, wife of Antonio Piccolo	
1540-1612	Giovanni Maria della Meduna	de la Methuna (di Varmo), Meduna Varmo	adopted son and heir of Alessandro della Meduna, priest in Azzano	
1540-1612	Caterina della Meduna		wife of Giovanni Maria, daughter of the lords of Varmo di Sotto	
1515-1564	Giovanni Antonio della Meduna	a Meduna, de la Methuna	son of Matteo, brother of Alessandro, resident of Pordenone, scholar of the diocese of Concordia, listed in several notary deeds as the buyer and rentier of a large amount of property assets (on several, also acting on behalf of his brother Alessandro)	
1531	Anna de Metuna	Antonia, di Meduna	wife of 'Giovanni Antonio B.' (see tombstone)	
1548	Giovanni Battista Meduna		sons of Giovanni Antonio	
1589	Giovanni Maria Meduna		sons of Giovanni Antonio	
16th century	Matteo Meduna		sons of Giovanni Antonio	
1541-1577	Francesco della Meduna		sons of Giovanni Antonio	
1546-1570	[Giovanni] Domenico Meduna	a Meduna, della Meduna	sons of Giovanni Antonio	
1592	[...] Maria della Meduna		son of Matteo	
	Liberale Meduna		son of Francesco	
1629	Aloisia Meduna		daughter of Liberale	
1584-1587	Domicio Meduna		son of Domenico	
1562-1605†	Stefano Meduna		[son of Domenico,] brother of Giovanni Battista, Pordenone, "and among the notable men of this family was Stefano, a most excellent lawyer and leader, who died in 1605. This one came to live in Udine, and was accepted first as Noble of the Council"	
1616	Giovanni Maria Meduna		son of Domenico, cleric	
1574-1613	Giovanni Battista Meduna	Ioannis Baptista, Zambattista, Methuna, Mettuna, Meduna di Pordenone	son of Domenico, cleric, presbyter, appointed by Bishop Michele della Torre and placed in possession of the church of San Giacomo in Brugnera, invested by the Bishop of Concordia Pietro Querini (on the orders of the Roman Curia) as parish priest and vicar of the church of San Pietro in Azzano, vicar of the cathedral of San Marco in Pordenone, and rector of the church of San Giovanni in San Quirino until 16 June 1605	
1572-1618†	Bartolomeo Meduna	Bartholomaus, Borchio, Metuna (della Motta, Methensis, Metensis)	son of Giovanni Battista, Franciscan (O.F.M.Conv.) cleric, scholar, teacher, and author, Guardian and Custos of the convent of Motta, Convents of Friuli, and the convent of Udine, author of two operettas in Italian, died on 15 November 1618	
1668	Francesco Meduna	Francesco Gasparotto dalla Meduna	brother of Bartolomeo, physician, "performs miraculous works in medical matters"	
1601-1644†	Alessandro Meduna	Aleandro, Meduna di Motta	brother or nephew of Bartolomeo, Franciscan (O.F.M.Conv.) cleric, professor of theology, ordained on 10 February 1601, Custos of the Convent in Udine since 1617 and Guardian since 1626, elected Prrovincial Minister of the Order's Province of Sant'Antonio in 1636, died on 17 April 1644	
1586-1611	Torquato Meduna		cousin of Bartolomeo	
1551-1557	Vincentius de Metuna		prefect of the Dominican monastery of Capodistria	
1556	Stephanus Locatellus Meduna	Stephano, Locattellus, Metuna, Methuna	son of Defendo (Defendente), Pordenone, Friuli; received a privilegium doctoratus (doctorate diploma degree in law) at the University of Padua on 2 February 1556, examinded and approved on 9 March 1556.	
1556	Silvester Grimaldus de Metuna	Silvestro Grimaldo a Methuna	son of Baptiste (Battista), Pordenone, Friuli; received a privilegium doctoratus (doctorate diploma degree in law) at the University of Padua on 23 April 1556, examinded and approved on 2 May 1556.	
1556	Petrus Grimaldus de Metuna		Friulian scholar of law at the University of Padua	
1558-1595	Mario della Meduna di Pordenone			
1620	Alessandra	Donna Aleandra	widow of Mario Meduna, daughter of Battista Aleandri (surgeon in Pordenone), died in San Quirino	
1579-1587	Daniel da la Meduna	de Meduna	Franciscan (O.F.M.Conv.) friar from the Order's Province of Sant'Antonio, under General Gonzaga, 1579-1587 in the Paris Chapter, 1583 the Order's Procurator at Rome, 1584 in the Toledo Congregation, under the same General Gonzaga	
1592-1608	Girolamo Meduna		zoccolante (clogs-wearing monk), Guardian of Motta	
1595-1602	Arminius Meduna	Erminio, Flaminio	priest, chaplain in Fagnigola, Pordenone	
17th century	Mauritius Meduna	Maurizio	presbyter	
1624	Domenico Meduna		children of Mauritius	
1624	[Dainia] Meduna		children of Mauritius	
1623-1685	Antonio Meduna	Methuna, Meduna da Motta	son of Mauritius, nobleman from Pordenone, notary in Feltre, Capodistria and Argostoli (in Cephalonia), appointed on 6 May 1672 cancelliere by Andrea Valiero, Venice's Provveditore Generale da Mar, as successor to Simone Budini	
1632-1678†	Michele Aurelio Meduna di Pordenone	Meduna di Motta	Franciscan (O.F.M.Conv.) cleric, Guardian of the Convents in Costozza, Gemona, Montebello, and Pordenone, died on 18 September 1678	
1658-1659	Ascanio Meduna		brothers	
1658-1659	Giovanni Maria Meduna		brothers	
1705†	Giovanni della Meduna		rector of the church of San Giorgio in Pordenone	
1733†	Fiorina Meduna			
1744	Giovanni Maria Meduna	Gio. Maria	parish priest and vicar forane of the church of San Giorgio in Pordenone	
1746-1825	Pasconi di Meduna			
1755	Mauritius Methuna		City Council of Pordenone ('Consilium Civitatis Portusnaonis')	
1755†	Domenico Meduna			

=== Venetian branch ===
Notable members of the family that lived and worked in Venice during the era of the Risorgimento were the architect Giovanni Battista Meduna (1800-1886) and his brother, engineer Tommaso Meduna (1798-1880), sons of carpenter and window maker Andrea Meduna.

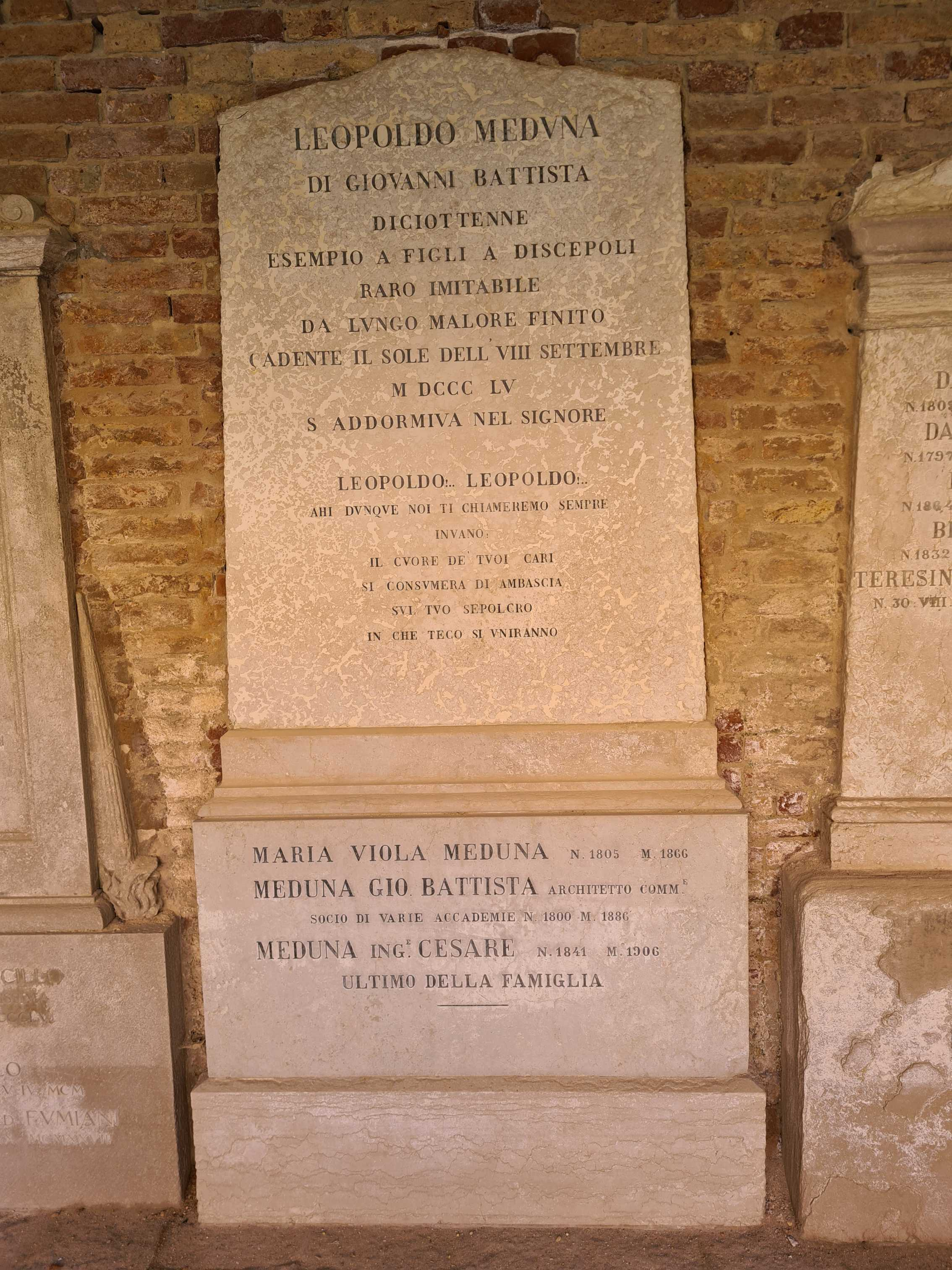
Meduna family tombstone, San Michele Cemetery, Venice

Giovanni Battista Meduna is buried at the San Michele Cemetery along with his wife Maria Viola (1805-1866) and their two sons Leopoldo (1837-1855) and Cesare Meduna (1841-1906), ending this particular lineage.

=== Treviso-Castelcucco branch ===
Another branch of the family moved south-west from their ancestral feud to Treviso, where they became citizens – attested as early as in the first decades of the 14th century (see historical mentions). This time coincides with the conspiracy attempt of the castellans of Meduna to sell the castle to Rizzardo da Camino, lord of the Treviso area, resulting in their banishment from the Meduna fief in 1327.

The arrival of members of the Treviso branch in nearby Castelcucco is reported in the first decades of the 16th century. The Meduna of Castelcucco (as well as neighboring Asolo and surrounding areas) owned a mansion below that of the Montini family along the Via Lungo Muson.

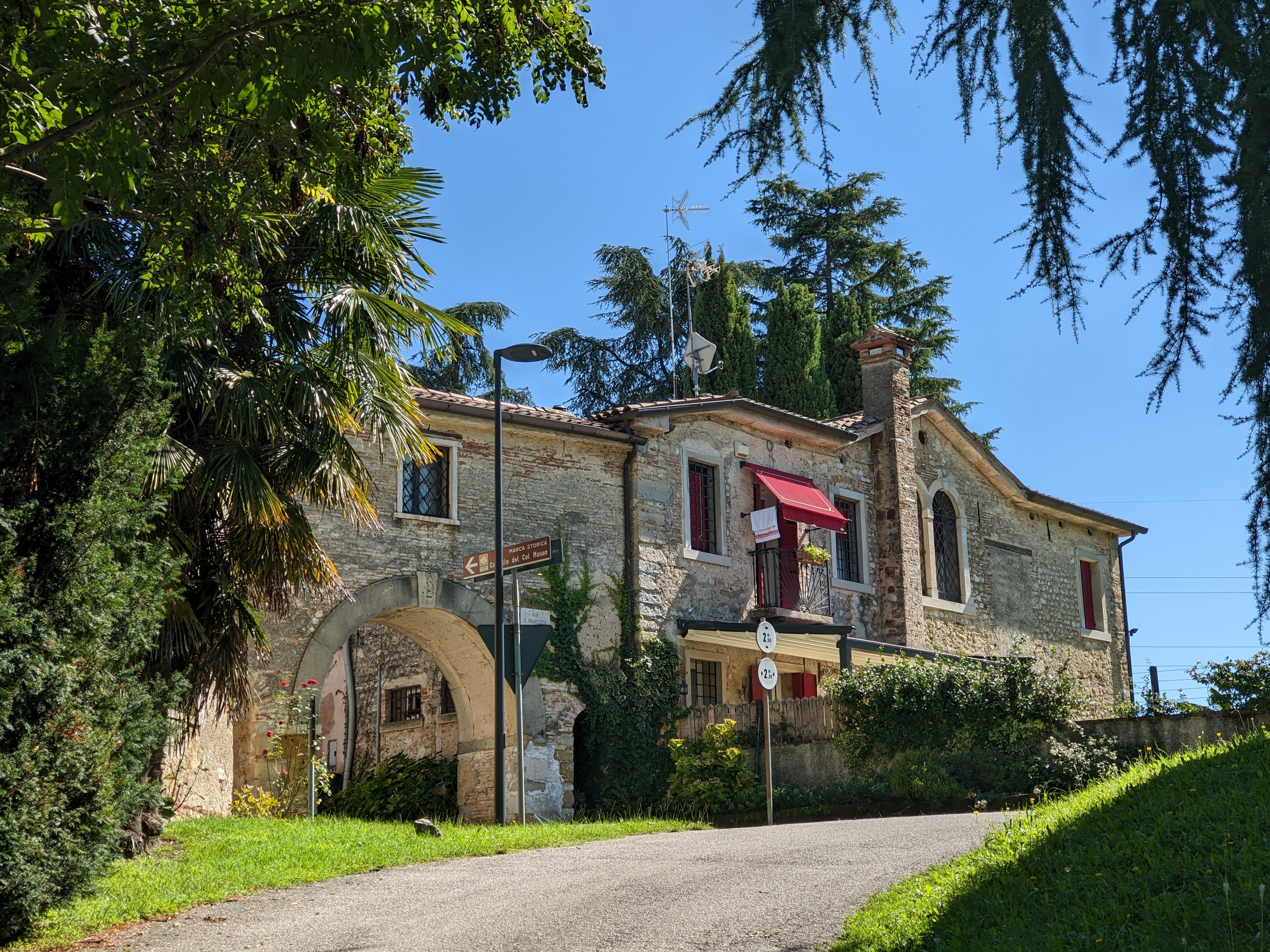
Villa Perusini (Meduna), Castelcucco

A splendid example of eighteenth-century artchitecture, the mansion passed from the Meduna to the Malafatti family, and in 1739 to the Perusini d'Asolo. In 1801, Naopoleon Bonaparte stayed at the villa, known today as Villa Perusini. The property subsequently passed to monsignore Pietro Basso, then the Pivetta family, then to cavaliere Lucio Pinarello at the beginning of the 20th century, subsequently to the Filippins and finally to Mr. Andreatta. For many years it was the residence of the famous writer Sergio Saviane, who died in 2001. The villa was once adorned with many surrounding gardens with fountains and water jets, which had been lost over the years. The small church of San Francesco is connected to the villa via a covered passage.

In 1776, the Meduna family also obtained from the Dall'Armi family the church of San Gaetano (dating back to the 5th and 6th centuries), together with its altarpiece, along the main road in Castelcucco. It, too, passed to the Perusini in 1805, to the noble Colbertaldo family in 1875, then again to the nobles of Meduna, and then to the Colferai. In 1936, the church was sold to Antonio Signor, who subsequently donated it to the parish of Castelcucco.

==== Historical mentions ====
The following is a list of members of the Treviso-Castelcucco branch of the Meduna family mentioned in historical records:

Year	Name	Alternative spelling	Details	Sources
1315	Stefano della Meduna		salaryman of the municipality of Treviso	
1318	Jacobus de Meduna		knight in Treviso, confirmed unanimously by 31 councilors as constable with 25 horsemen with helms and as many crossbowmen and squires with lances	
1523-1557	Girolamo della Meduna di Treviso			
1523-1557	Girolamo (II) della Meduna di Treviso	Gerolamo	son of Girolamo, resident of Longamuson, has purchased this property already from 1523 onwards from Dorigo son of Guarnerio Zardo from Crespano	
1562	Antonia		daughter of the painter Leonardo da Verona living in Borgo Santa Caterina in Asolo, widow of Girolamo (II) Meduna, citizen of Treviso	
1562	Giovanni Meduna		son of Girolamo (II), stepson of Antonia, half-brother of Giacomo and Bartolomeo	
1592	Ludovico Meduna		son of Giovanni, priest of the church of San Giorgio in Castelcucco	
1580	Giacomo Metuna	da Meduna	member of the college of judges of Treviso	
1621-1642	Vincenzo Meduna	Metuna, Meduno [sic!]	parish priest of Sant'Ambrogio di Fiera in Treviso (1621-1626), nominated as public tutor (precettore) in Pordenone in 1623 (did not accept), priest in Savorgnano, Udine (1630-1642)	
1670	Paolo Francesco Meduna		nephew of Ludovico, priest of the church of San Giorgio (after his uncle) until 1670	
1715	Antonio Meduna			
1715	Paolo Meduna		son of Antonio, descends from ancient citizens of Treviso, resident at Castelcucco Nr. 33, Col di Muson (Villa Meduna)	
18th century	Giovanni Paolo Meduna	Paolo, Gio. Paolo, Gian Paolo, Gian-Paolo, Giampaolo	abbot, poet, professor of belles-lettres at the Treviso Seminary, then of eloquence at the Feltre Seminary, author of academic works and poems in praise of Canova and an oriental hymn as an epithalamium for Napoleon's wedding to Marie Louise ("Per l'Augusto Imeneo"), provost of Asolo, archpriest of Monfumo, died 28 June 1835 in Vicenza	
1810-1835†	Giovanni Paolo Meduna	Paolo, Gio. Paolo, Gian Paolo, Gian-Paolo, Giampaolo	abbot, poet, professor of belles-lettres at the Treviso Seminary, then of eloquence at the Feltre Seminary, author of academic works and poems in praise of Canova and an oriental hymn as an epithalamium for Napoleon's wedding to Marie Louise ("Per l'Augusto Imeneo"), provost of Asolo, archpriest of Monfumo, died 28 June 1835 in Vicenza	
1848	Paolo Meduna		member of the Municipal Representation of Asolo	
1824-1857†	Fortunato Meduna		born 1824, mansionario and confessore at the Duomo di Asolo, died 2 July 1857	
1868-1871	Severo Meduna			
1868-1871	Francesco Meduna		son of the late Severo, landowner, born in 1828, mayor of Castelcucco, unmarried, living with his sisters, moved to Paderno in 1905, where he owned the osteria near the San Giacomo hotel	

The first census of Italy in 1871 only records the family of Francesco Meduna, son of Severo, in Castelcucco. As mayor of Castelcucco in 1868, Francesco Meduna raised funds for the Consorzio Nazionale, established by king Victor Emmanuel II in 1866 as a fund for the amortization of national debt, as well as for the wedding of crown prince Umberto and his first cousin Margherita of Savoy.

His brother Giuseppe Carlo Meduna (1821–1895) emigrated to Budapest, Hungary, in the first half of the nineteenth century, where he became an award-winning salami maker and progenitor of the Hungarian branch of the Meduna family.

In Hungary, he used the noble title von Meduna, Edler v. Montecucco. Members of this branch are mentioned in several Austro-Hungarian records as Meduna di Montecucco. One of his grandchildren was renowned neuropathologist and neuropsychiatrist Ladislas J. Meduna (1896–1964).

== Lands of the Bohemian Crown ==
The first record of the name Meduna outside of Italy appears in 1373 in the village of Bohuslavice, in today's Vysočina Region of the Czech Republic. A certain Mixo (Mikeš, Niklaš) called Meduna and his brother Swathon (Svatoň, Šwach) bought a feudal estate (manor) from Hron of Bohuslavice. However, this appears to be a nickname rather than a family name. Meduna as a definitive hereditary surname first appears in the 16th century in the Lands of the Bohemian Crown, at a time when the Protestant Reformation heralded the end of the Middle Ages and the beginning of the early modern period in Europe.

=== Melissaeus priests ===
A family of Utraquist Hussite priests appears in the second half of the 16th century in North and Central Bohemia: Jakub Melissaeus Krtský (1554–1599), Václav Melissaeus Krtský (1540–1578), and Václav Melissaeus Lounský (c. 1573–1631).

Their surname "Melissaeus" is an onomastic latinisation (common in scholarly and clerical circles of the time) of the name Meduna resulting from the Ancient Greek Melisseus (Μελισσεύς), based on the local interpretation of the name being related to honey (med in Czech) or Melissa (lemon balm, meduňka in Czech). Several modern Czech sources revert to the non-Latin version and refer to the Melissaeus priests explicitly as Meduna.

=== East-Bohemian branch ===
When the Peace of Westphalia ended the Thirty Years' War in Europe, the Habsburg Empire begann to reassert their power and sought to re-Catholicize the Protestant-leaning Lands of the Bohemian Crown. In order to determine where best to focus their proselytizing efforts of the Counter-Reformation, a detailed census was needed. To this end, Patents were issued in February and June of 1651 that directed the Bohemian Estates to record the names and religious denominations of all persons within their dominions on standardized forms, referred to as the List of Subjects According to Their Faith (serfs register).

==== Historical mentions: Seč estate ====
Of the 19 regions of Bohemia covered in the List of Subjects, a family of the name Meduna is mentioned only on the Seč estate in the East-Bohemian Chrudim District. The estate was owned in 1651 by Emanuele de Couriers, who inherited it from his father François de Couriers, a French nobleman by origin and an officer of the imperial Habsburg army. He bought Seč (in 1628) and other estates cheaply from confiscations following the Battle of White Mountain, after the previous owners who participated in the Bohemian Revolt were forced into exile.The dominions of Seč and Nasavrky (purchased by de Couriers in 1623) were among the least religiously united territories, with the share of non-Catholics exceeding 80%.

Region	Estate	Locality	Name	Year of birth	Description	Faith	Note
Chrudim	Seč	Bojanov	Martin Meduna	1621	podruh	non-Catholic	
Chrudim	Seč	Bojanov	Magdalena Meduna	1620	wife of Martin	non-Catholic	
Chrudim	Seč	Bojanov	Jakub Meduna	1633	son of Martin	non-Catholic	
Chrudim	Seč	Bojanov	Václav Meduna	1636	son of Martin	non-Catholic	^{A}
Chrudim	Seč	[Nové] Lhotice	Adam Meduna	1595	chalupník	non-Catholic	
Chrudim	Seč	[Nové] Lhotice	Lidmilla Meduna	1627	wife of Adam	non-Catholic	
Chrudim	Seč	Křižanovice	Jan Meduna	1620	sedlák	non-Catholic	^{B}
Chrudim	Seč	Křižanovice	Anna Meduna	1630	wife of Jan	non-Catholic	
Chrudim	Seč	Křižanovice	Jiřík Meduna	1618	chalupník	non-Catholic	
Chrudim	Seč	Křižanovice	Kateřina Meduna	1629	wife of Jiřík	non-Catholic	
Chrudim	Seč	Křižanovice	Anna Meduna	1635	daughter of Jiřík	non-Catholic	
Chrudim	Seč	Liboměřice	Václav Meduna	1613	sedlák	non-Catholic	^{C, D}
Chrudim	Seč	Liboměřice	Kateřina Meduna	1625	wife of Václav	non-Catholic	
^{ABC} Entries also to be found in the 1654 Berní rula (see below). ^{D} Secret protestant services were held in the Meduna barn in Liboměřice Nr. 8 until the Patent of Toleration in 1781.

Since the 17th century, this region developed as the historical epicenter of the Meduna family in the Czech lands, and to this day the name remains most prevalent in Chrudim District. Several existing branches of the Meduna family in Austria as well as the United States trace back their lineages to the East-Bohemian branch.

In 1654, the Crown ordered a record of all taxable subjects (property-owning population) in Bohema, known as the Berní rula. In addition to members of the Meduna family on the Seč estate recorded three years earlier, the Berní rula mentions a Jakub Meduna from Vltava region and a Václav Meduna of Prague.

Region	Estate	Locality	Name	Description	Note
Vltava	Tejnice, Benice	Chrášťany	Jakub Meduna	zahradník	^{D}
Chrudim	Seč	Křižanovice	Jan Meduna	sedlák	^{B}
Chrudim	Seč	[Nové] Lhotice	Václav Meduna	sedlák	^{A}
Chrudim	Seč	Liboměřice	Václav Meduna	sedlák	^{C}
Prague	U Karafiátů	Žatecká street 42	Václav Meduna	komorník desk.	^{E}
Chrudim	Seč	Licibořice	Havel Meduna	chalupnik	
^{ABC} Entries also to be found in the 1651 List of Subjects According to Their Faith (see above). ^{D} About 10 km north-east from Chrášťany, in the Petroupim municipality a forest with the name Meduna (Meduny) is recorded as early as 1409. The area today also includes a hill, a stream and a game lodge with the name Meduná. ^{E}.

==== Historical mentions: Prague ====
In 1604, a certain Jakub Meduna from Borová, on the Polná-Přibyslav estate owned by Rudolf Žejdlic of Šenfeld (Seydlitz von Schönfeld), located some 30 km south of the Seč estate, was enrolled at Prague's Charles University. In 1611, he is listed as a resident of Prague.

On 21 May 1643, the tailor Jan Duchoslav Karafilát bequeathed his house on Kaprova street Nr. 42 (corner of Žatecká street, on the right hand side) in Prague to his wife Kateřina Barbora. After his passing, on 17 September 1646 the widow married Václav Meduna (listed in the Berní rula), who was chamberlain (Civis S.C.M. [cum privilegio Suae Caesareae Majestatis] Cammerarius) at the tabulas regni, and transferred the house to him. The confession registers from the parish of St. Valentine in the Old Town of Prague – compiled during the re-Catholicisation period of the Czech lands – list Václav to be 42 years old, and his wife Kateřina 46, both Catholic.

=== Meduna von Riedburg ===
One notable family descending from the East-Bohemian branch were the Meduna von Riedburg, who trace back their title of nobility to Johann Meduna von Riedburg. Descendants of this family today live in Germany and Brazil, where they emigrated at the beginning of the 20th century.

=== South-Moravian branch ===
The proliferation of the name Meduna in South Moravia begins with Šimon Medoňa († 1698), land owner in Drnovice, Blansko District, in the 1650s. He is recorded not only in the Moravian Lánové rejstříky (1657) – a source comparable to the Bohemian Berní rula, but also in the Moravské a Slezské Urbáře (1677) and in the first local church books.

The surname of his lineage and descendants has most commonly been transcribed in local records as Meduňa/Medoňa, a spelling resulting from palatal consonants in Moravian dialects (e.g. the word day analogously morphs from den in Czech to deň in Moravian). As the only recorded Meduna of his generation in this region, he is the progenitor of the South-Moravian branch of the Meduna family. His two sons Georg (Jiřík) and Jakob (Jakub) Meduňa established family lines that exist until this day, with descendant branches most prominent in the Czech Republic, Austria, the United States and Brazil.

== Heraldry ==
The coat of arms of the Meduna family went through several iterations over the centuries. Neither the emblem of the ancestral feudal lords of Meduna since their origin in the 11th century until they were banished by the Patriarch in 1327, nor that of the lords of Meduno, is known. The following versions are recorded from the 16th century onwards. Both the family and their homonymous community of origin were often represented by the same coat of arms.

oldest known Meduna coat of arms, Motta di Livenza

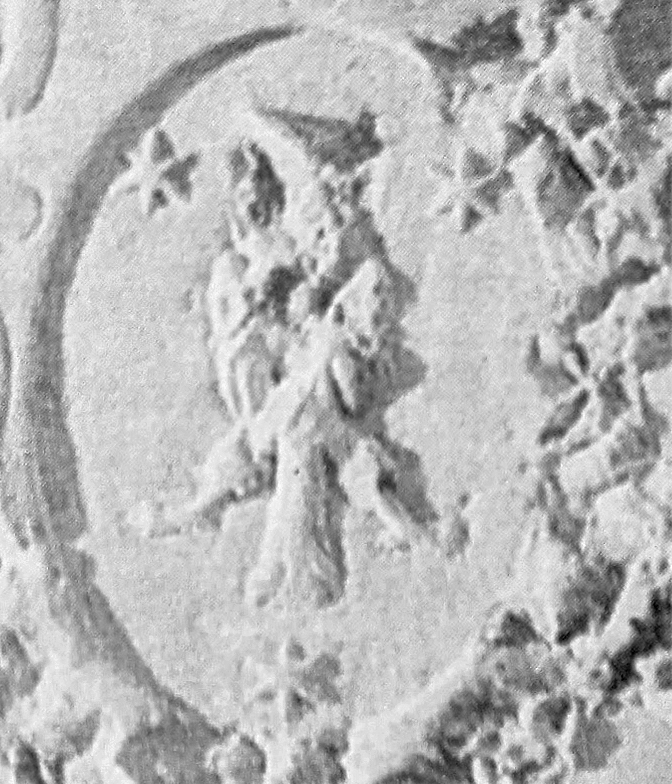
oldest known Meduna coat of arms, detail of the fragment

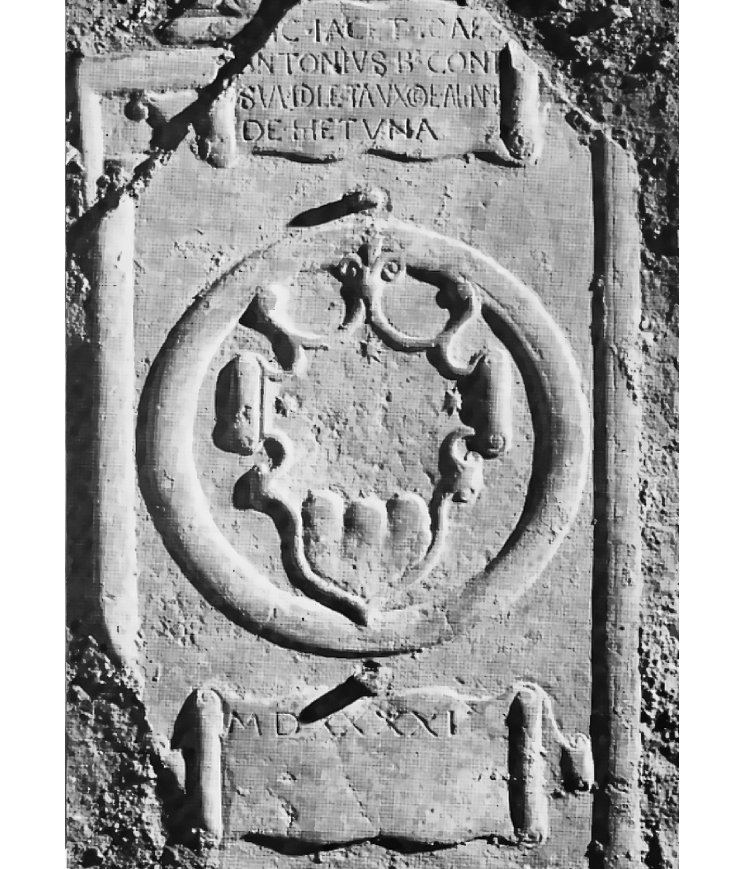
tombstone of Giovanni Antonio B. and Anna de Metuna, 1531

The above coat of arms is reported to be the oldest known heraldic insignium of Meduna, found at the Sanctuary of Madonna dei Miracoli in Motta di Livenza. Goi (1993) describes the charge in the field as alla civetta in maestà accompagnata da 3 stelle (owl facing the beholder accompanied by 3 stars) and observes that the position with the enlarged claws is notable.

It was still in use in the first half of the 16th century, and is identical or nearly identical with the coats of arms of the following families:

- Locatelli of Castelfranco (west of Treviso) and Sicily (as well as their comune of origin, Locatello in Bergamo)
- Perocco (of Meduna)
- Pinali of Pordenone
- Artico of Ceneda (north-east of Meduna di Livenza)
- Simonini of Udine
- a certain Pompeo Coronini of Gorizia (north-east of Aquileia)
- Mendoza (of Spanish origin)
- Mortari of Genoa
- Lavinia of Filottrano

The shared coat of arms and geographical proximity of most of these families (see for example Matteo della Meduna da Bergamo, the region of origin of the Locatelli) could indicate genealogical relations between them – despite the inheritance of different names – or a feudal relation with the community of Meduna. Some of the above, however, particularly of more remote locations or slight heraldic variations, might well be unrelated.

The owl as a symbol of wisdom is also reminiscent of the iconography in the allegoric emblem of Bartolomeo Meduna: The nymph Meduna is carrying the horn of Amalthea (described as symbolizing scientific progress) and leaning against a threefold mountain of the same name. The water that springs from the mountain (the river Meduna) is described as a source wisdom – analogously to the owl atop the threefold mountain.

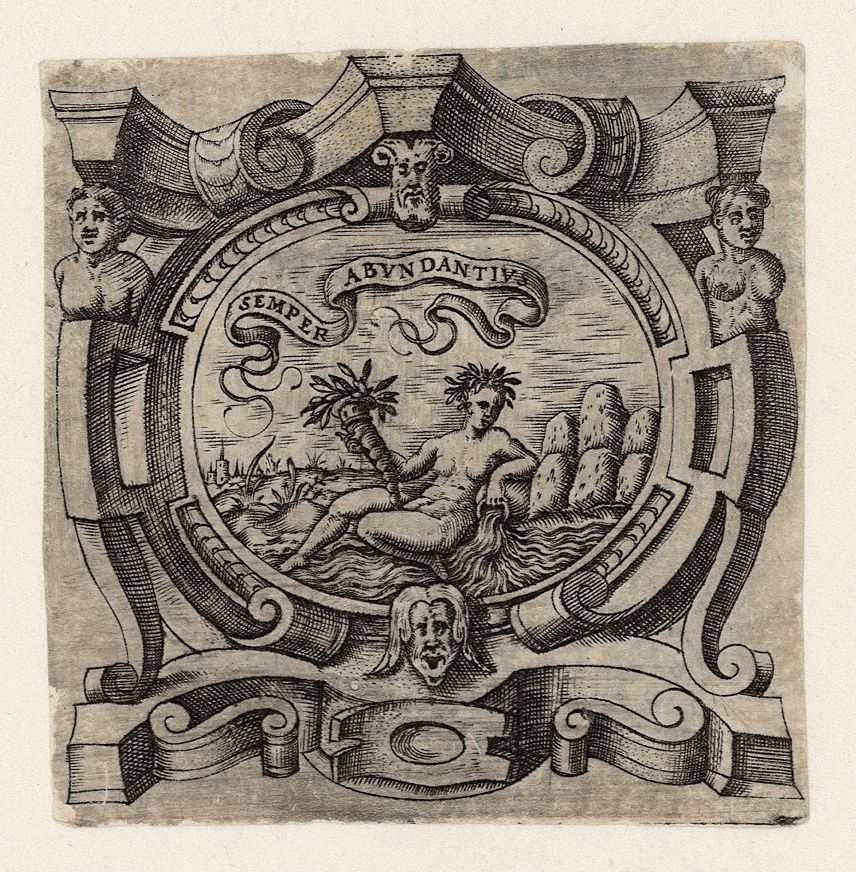
Emblem of Bartolomeo Meduna, engraving by Girolamo Porro

Since the late 16th century, the below versions start to appear – both as coats of arms of the community of Meduna and the family of this name. A combination with the old owl coat of arms appears in two simple and quartered versions also in the Joppi armorial (n. 403, 922), but with the owl placed in natural position, while the two stars on the top remain unchanged, and a letter M poled with a comet on the central leg.

Meduna coat of arms, Armoriale Joppi 207 (n. 403)

Meduna coat of arms, Armoriale Joppi 207 (n. 922)

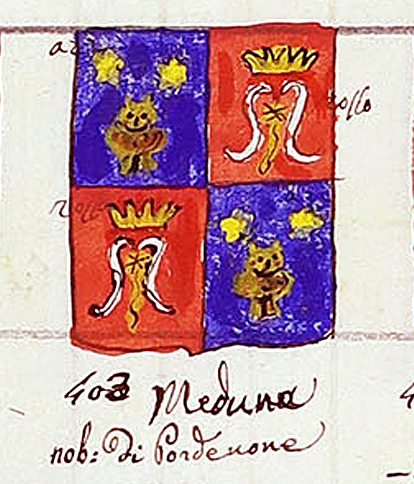
Meduna coat of arms, Armoriale Joppi 207 (n. 403)

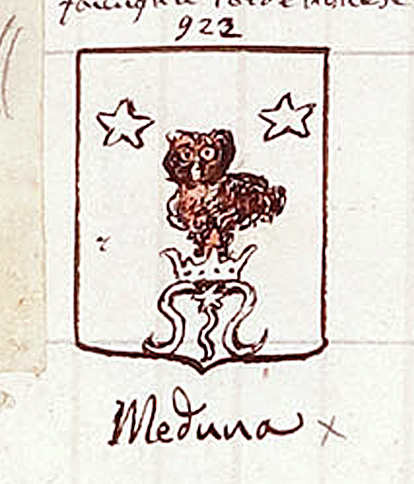
Meduna coat of arms, Armoriale Joppi 207 (n. 922)

In subsequent itarations the owl and the stars disappear. The letter M (in or) on gules tincture – without the comet – is described by Rietstap and depicted in the De Rubeis manuscript (n. 1114). A version parted per fess is described by Spreti: a combination of the crowned golden M on red in the upper half with a golden shield in the lower half.

Meduna coat of arms (based on description in Spreti 1968)

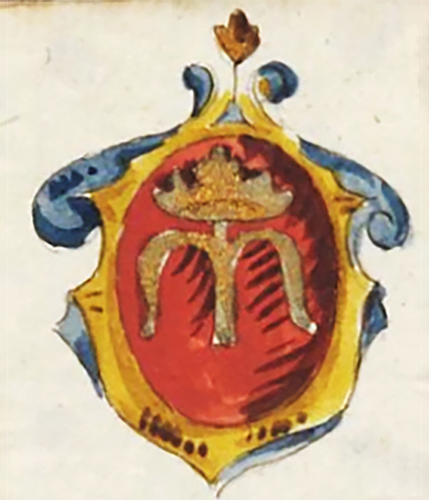
Meduna coat of arms, Armoriale De Rubeis 1114 (p. 28)

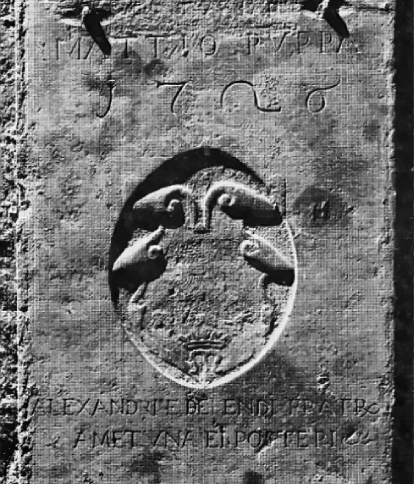
Tombstone of brothers Alessandro and Defendente Meduna, c. 1560

The parted version of the coat of arms became the default heraldic representation subsequently integrated in their coats of arms by other families invested with the jurisdiction of Meduna, for example:

Alberghetti, Consignori di Meduna, coat of arms

Perocco, Consignori di Meduna, coat of arms

Bondenti, Conti di Meduna, coat of arms

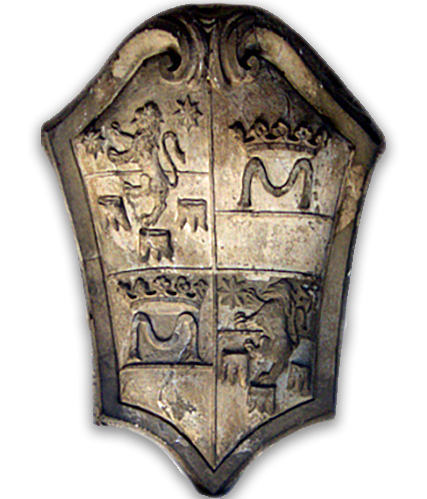
Bondenti, Conti di Meduna, coat of arms

Lechi, Conti di Meduna, coat of arms

Girardi, Conti di Meduna, coat of arms

Finally, the below three-coloured coat of arms of Meduna is reported since the 18th century, with the traditional parted gules and or tinctures supplemented by a sable one, and without any charges. How and why the heraldic emblems transitioned over the centuries is not known – possibly they were representations of related yet distinct branches of the family.

Meduna coat of arms (18th century), based on description in di Crollalanza 1895

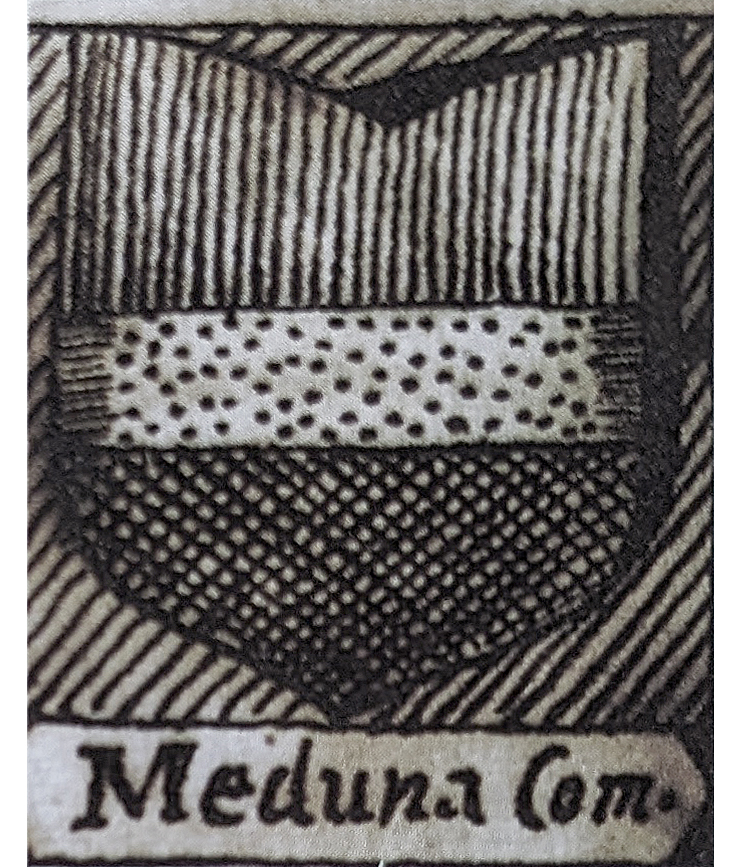
Meduna coat of arms (18th century), Armoriale Manin – Manoscritto 201

The contemporary emblem of the comune (municipality) of Meduna di Livenza is yet a different one.

== See also ==
- Meduna di Livenza
- Meduno
