= Johann Meduna =

Austrian resistance fighter against the Nazi regime

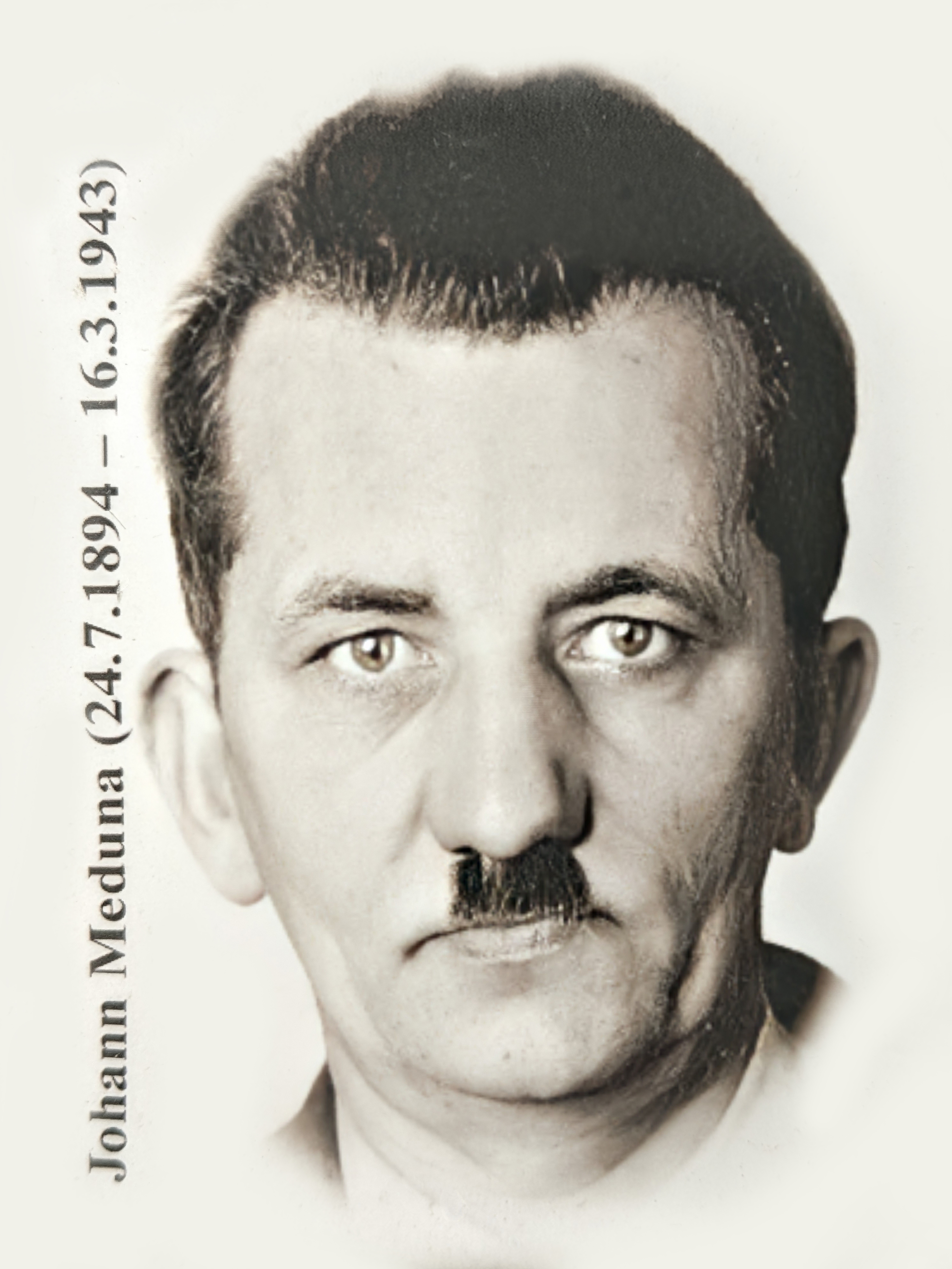
Johann Meduna

Johann Meduna (24 July 1894 – 16 March 1943) was a Czech-Austrian resistance fighter against the Nazi regime.

A descendant of the South-Moravian branch of the Meduna family, he was born on 24 July 1894 in Podmyče, Moravia, and executed on 16 March 1943 in Vienna. He was a master tailor in Vienna's 16th district. In 1912, he joined the Austrian Social Democratic Workers' Party.

Together with his son, he worked illegally for the Communist Party, producing and distributing leaflets. He was arrested on 27 January 1941 and sentenced to death on 14 December 1942. He was guillotined in Vienna on 16 March 1943.
