= József Meduna di Montecucco =

Italian-Hungarian salami maker (1821–1895)

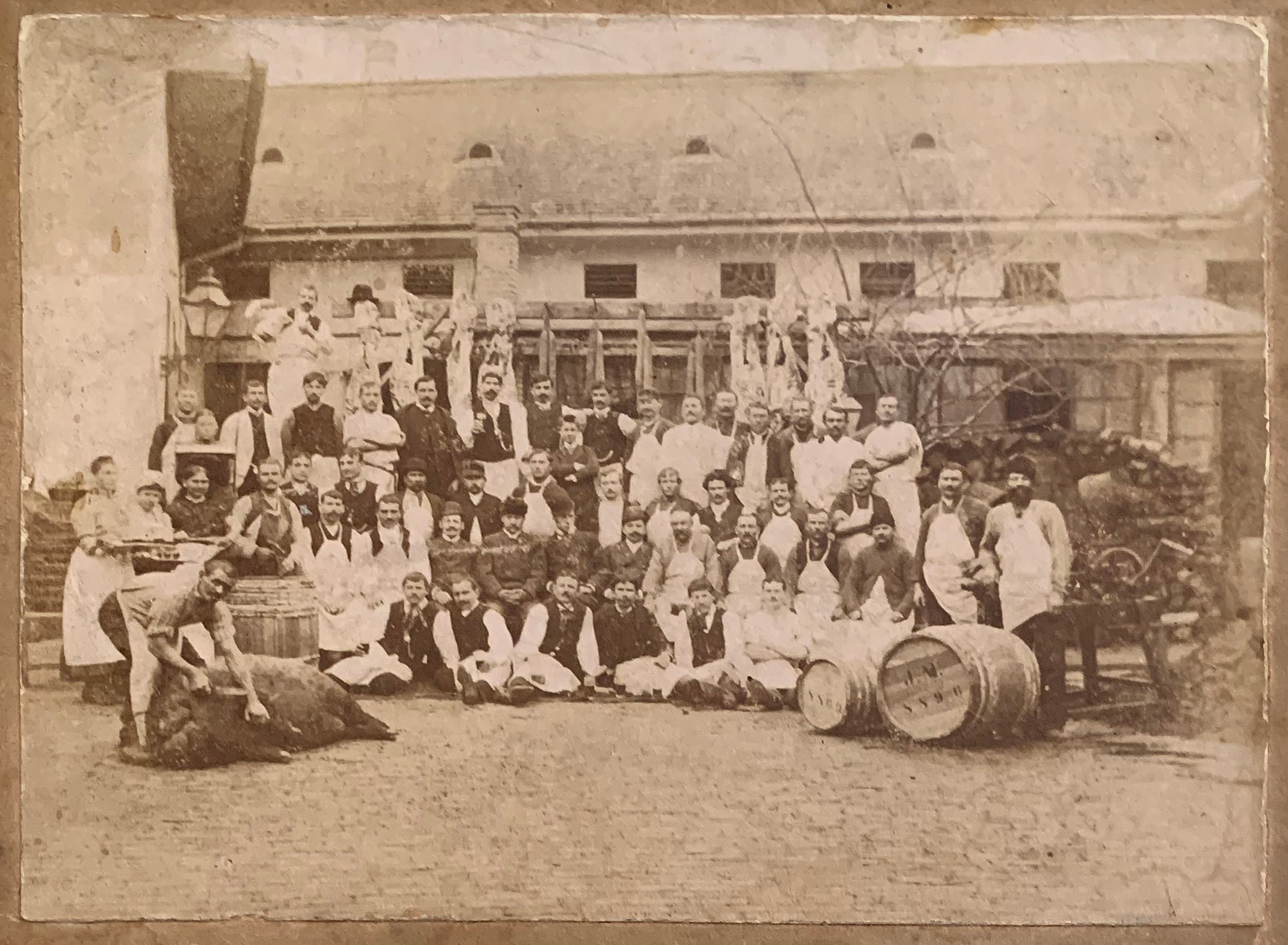
Meduna salami factory in Budapest

József Meduna di Montecucco (30 June 1821 – 28 January 1895) was an Italian-Hungarian salami maker.

== Biography ==
A descendant of the Meduna family, he was born on 30 June 1821 in Castelcucco, Austrian Empire, as Giuseppe Carlo Meduna, son of Severo and brother of Francesco Meduna, mayor of Castelcucco in 1868.

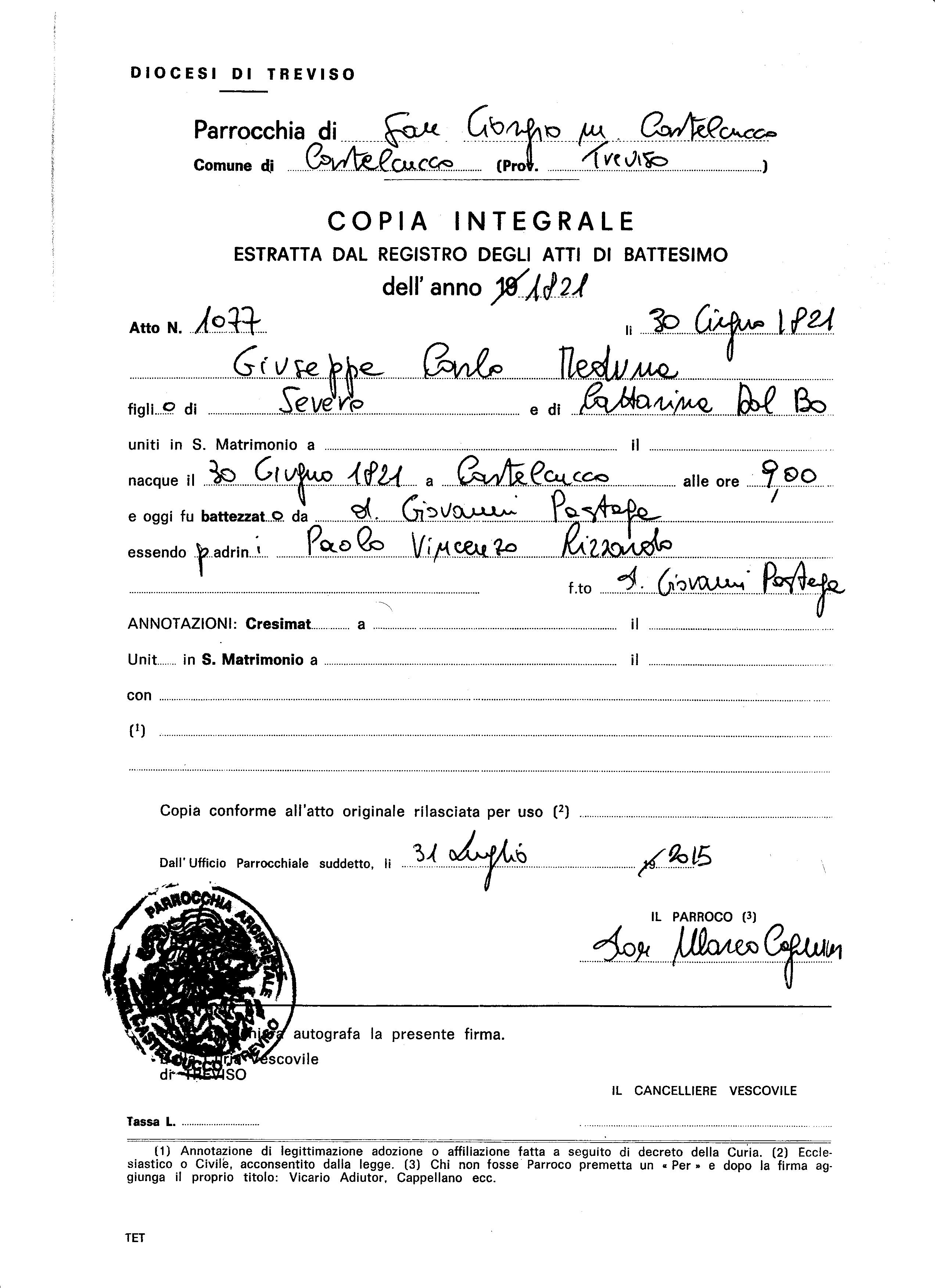
Baptism certificate of Giuseppe Carlo Meduna, Castelcucco, Italy

As member of the national guard he participated in the Hungarian Revolution of 1848. He was a member of the Hungarian Armed Forces Association and one of the founders of the Hungarian Industry Association.

Meduna was one of several Friulian entrepreneurs who adapted Italian culinary tradition and created a new market and industry for salami. With a small capital form Giovanni Piazzoni, he founded the first Hungarian "steamed salami and fat products" factory in Budapest in 1850, pioneering and popularizing the cured sausage of Italian origin in Hungarian cuisine and culture. Other Friulian butchers followed suit in the seasonal production of winter salami, including the Del Medico brothers, the Guglielmini, Suberca, Molinari, Boschetti, Forgiarini, Dozzi, Vidoni and Venturini. Until the outbreak of World War II, their factories almost exclusively employed workers from Friuli due to their craftsmanship.

For his products, Meduna received awards at the 1873 Vienna World's Fair, the 1878 Paris Exposition, and in 1879 a Silver Cross of Merit by Minister Béla Wenckheim on behalf of Emperor Franz Joseph I for the services achieved during the World Exhibition in Paris. At the 1885 Budapest National Exhibition under the patronage of Crown Prince Rudolf, he received the big exhibition medal, and a gold medal at the 1888 Brussels International Exhibition.

In Hungary, he used the noble title von Meduna, Edler v. Montecucco. Members of this branch are mentioned in several Austro-Hungarian records as Meduna di Montecucco.

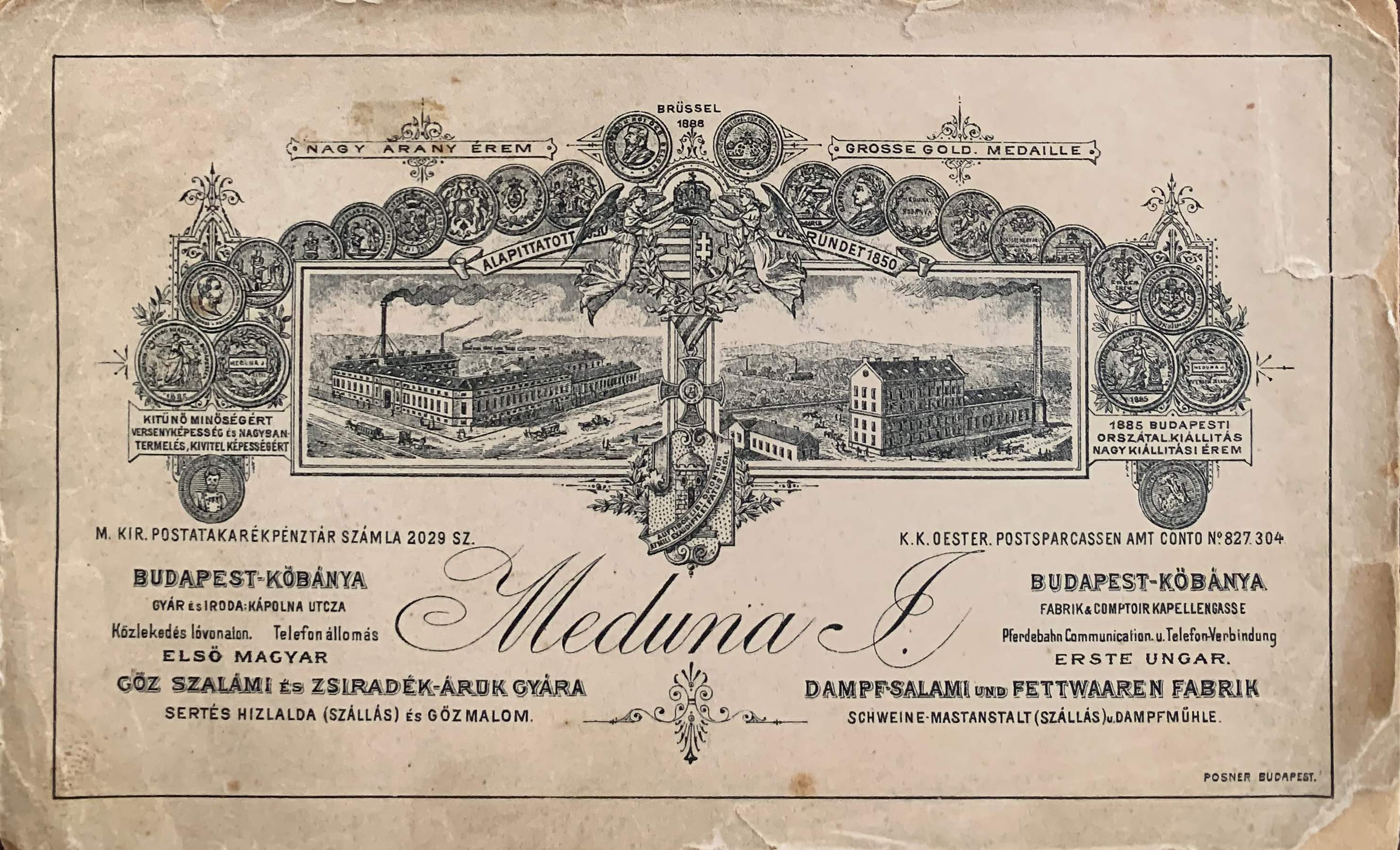
Meduna salami factory postcard

He died on 28 January 1895 in Budapest as the father of fourteen children. Renowned neuropathologist and neuropsychiatrist Ladislas J. Meduna was one of his grandsons.
