= Johann Meduna von Riedburg =

Officer in the Austro-Hungarian Army

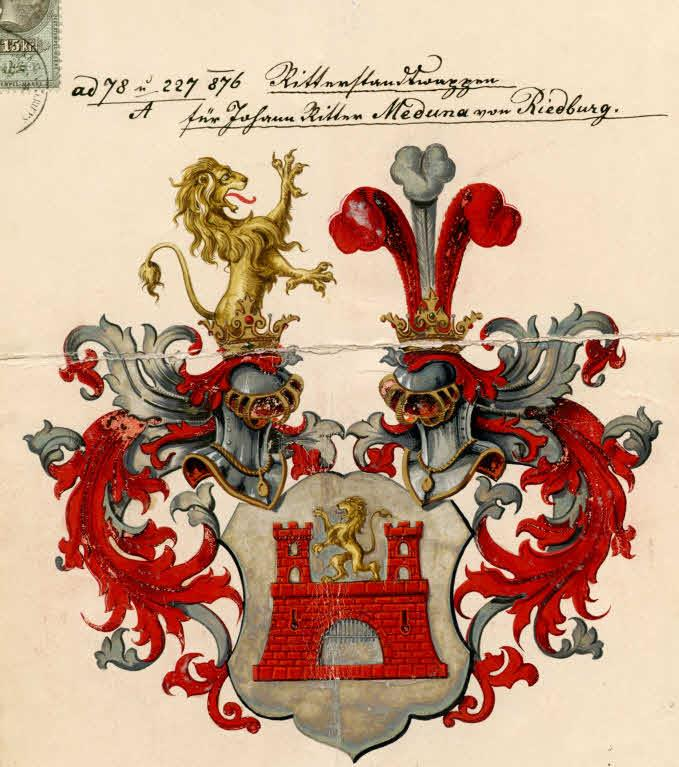
Meduna von Riedburg coat of arms

Johann Nepomuk Meduna Ritter von Riedburg (12 April 1815 – 19 January 1895) was an ennobled officer in the Imperial Austrian Army and the progenitor of the house of Meduna von Riedburg.

== Personal life ==
A descendant of the Bohemian-Austrian branch of the Meduna family, Johann Nepomuk Meduna was born on 12 April 1815 in Königgrätz (Hradec Králové) to the lawyer Johann Nepomuk Meduna (1784–1836) and Anna Ursula Catharina Kemlink (1789–1837), cousin of Alois Kemlink (1779–1859), the long-time burgomaster of Königgrätz in 1824–1848.

He was the brother of Adolph Aloisius, Aloisia Anna, and Edmund Franz Meduna.

On 18 Jul 1842, he married Anna Karabáczek (1819–1897), with whom he had eight children: Julius Paul Franz (1843–1928), Edmund (1844–1899), Anna (born 1847), Victor (1847–1924), Johann (1849–1885), Maria (born 1852), Franz (1853–1908), and Adolf Johann Nepomuk Josef (1854–1936).

His son Victor, lieutenant field marshal and commander of the Salzburg House Regiment Archduke Rainer No. 59, obtained a second nobility title in 1903, thereby establishing the name Meduna Ritter von Riedburg und Langenstauffen-Pyllwitz for himself and is descendants.

Johann Meduna von Riedburg died on 19 January 1895 in Teplice.

== Military career and awards ==
In 1831 Meduna joined the 21st infantry regiment Freiherr von Reischach as a private (Gemeiner). In 1836, he was promoted to ensign (Fähnrich), in 1847 to first lieutenant (Oberleutnant), in 1851 to captain (Hauptmann) and in 1859 to the rank of major. His military assignments included:

- 1831-1832: the occupation of the duchies of Parma and Modena and the Romagna;
- 1849: the siege of Komárom during the Hungarian War of Independence as captain and commander of the 22nd field company;
- 1859: the Battle of Magenta as senior ranking captain and commander of the 2nd field battalion;
- 1859: the Battle of Solferino as captain of the 5th division responsible for the defense of the imperial court of Solferino.

In recognition of his achievements, Meduna received the Military Merit Cross (with War Decoration).

On 28 November 1861, as major of the 21st infantry regiment, Meduna received a hereditary nobility award with the title von Riedburg.

On 12 August 1875, as colonel and reserve commander of the 71st infantry regiment Freiherr von Roßbacher, he received the Imperial Order of the Iron Crown (Third Class), thereby obtaining the right to hereditary knighthood (Ritter), which was conferred upon him after his retirement, on 21 May 1876.
