= Licibořice =

- Municipality
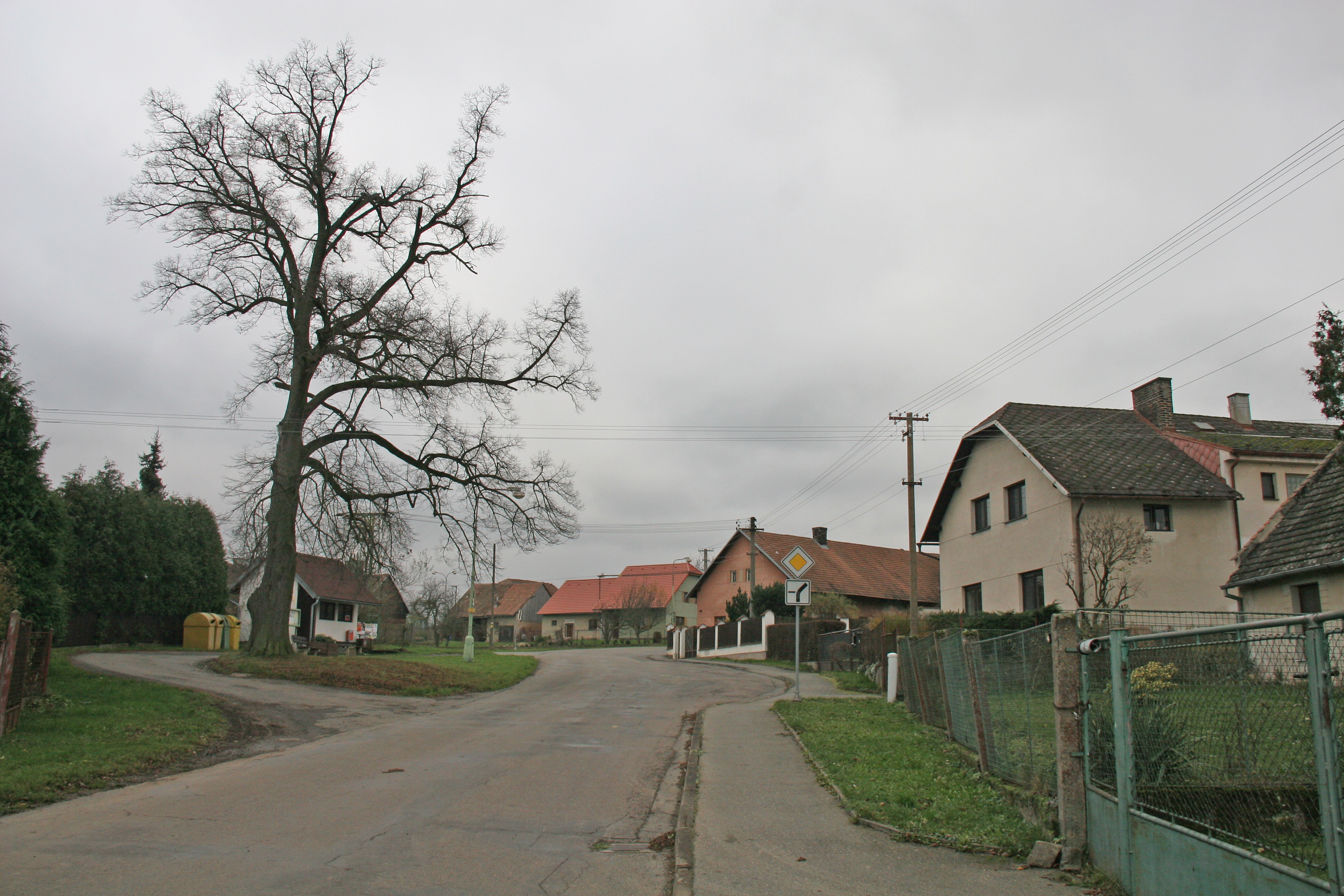
- Šiškovice, a part of Licibořice

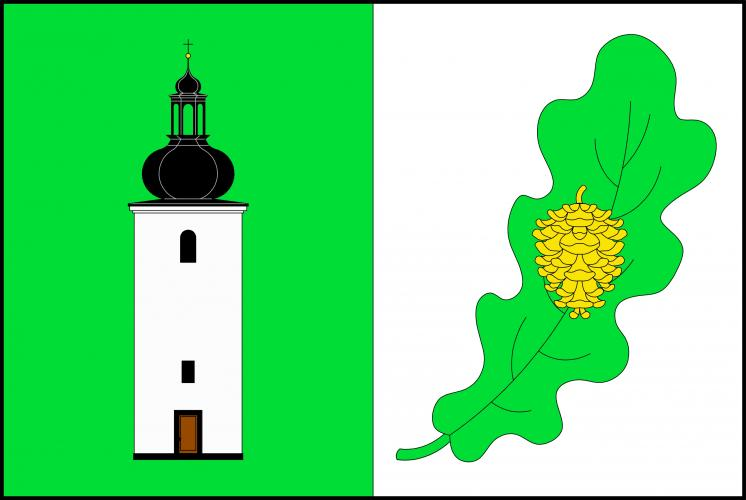
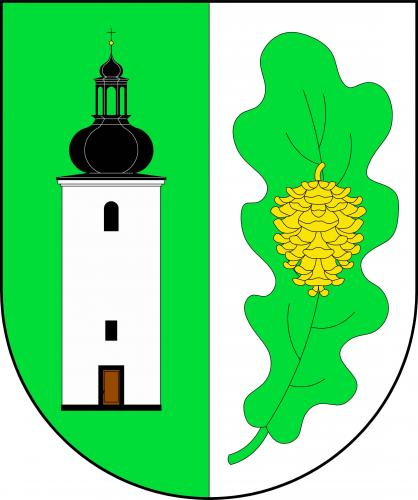
- Flag Coat of arms

- Location in the Czech Republic
- Coordinates: 49°52′37″N 15°45′36″E
- Country: Czech Republic
- Region: Pardubice
- District: Chrudim
- First mentioned: 1329

Area
  - Total: 9.25 km^{2} (3.57 sq mi)
- Elevation: 403 m (1,322 ft)

Population (2026-01-01)
  - Total: 261
  - Density: 28.2/km^{2} (73.1/sq mi)
- Time zone: UTC+1 (CET)
  - Summer (DST): UTC+2 (CEST)
- Postal codes: 538 21, 538 23
- Website: www.liciborice.cz

Licibořice (German: Litziborschitz) is a municipality and village in Chrudim District in the Pardubice Region of the Czech Republic. It has about 300 inhabitants.

== Administrative division ==
Licibořice consists of three municipal parts (in brackets population according to the 2021 census):

- Licibořice (146)
- Šiškovice (86)
- Slavice (17)

== Demographics ==
Historical population
Year	Pop.	±%
1869	309	—
1880	342	+10.7%
1890	321	−6.1%
1900	303	−5.6%
1910	294	−3.0%
1921	285	−3.1%
1930	274	−3.9%
1950	257	−6.2%
1961	222	−13.6%
1970	215	−3.2%
1980	236	+9.8%
1991	224	−5.1%
2001	253	+12.9%
2011	232	−8.3%
2021	249	+7.3%
Source: Censuses
