= Křižanovice (Chrudim District) =

- Municipality
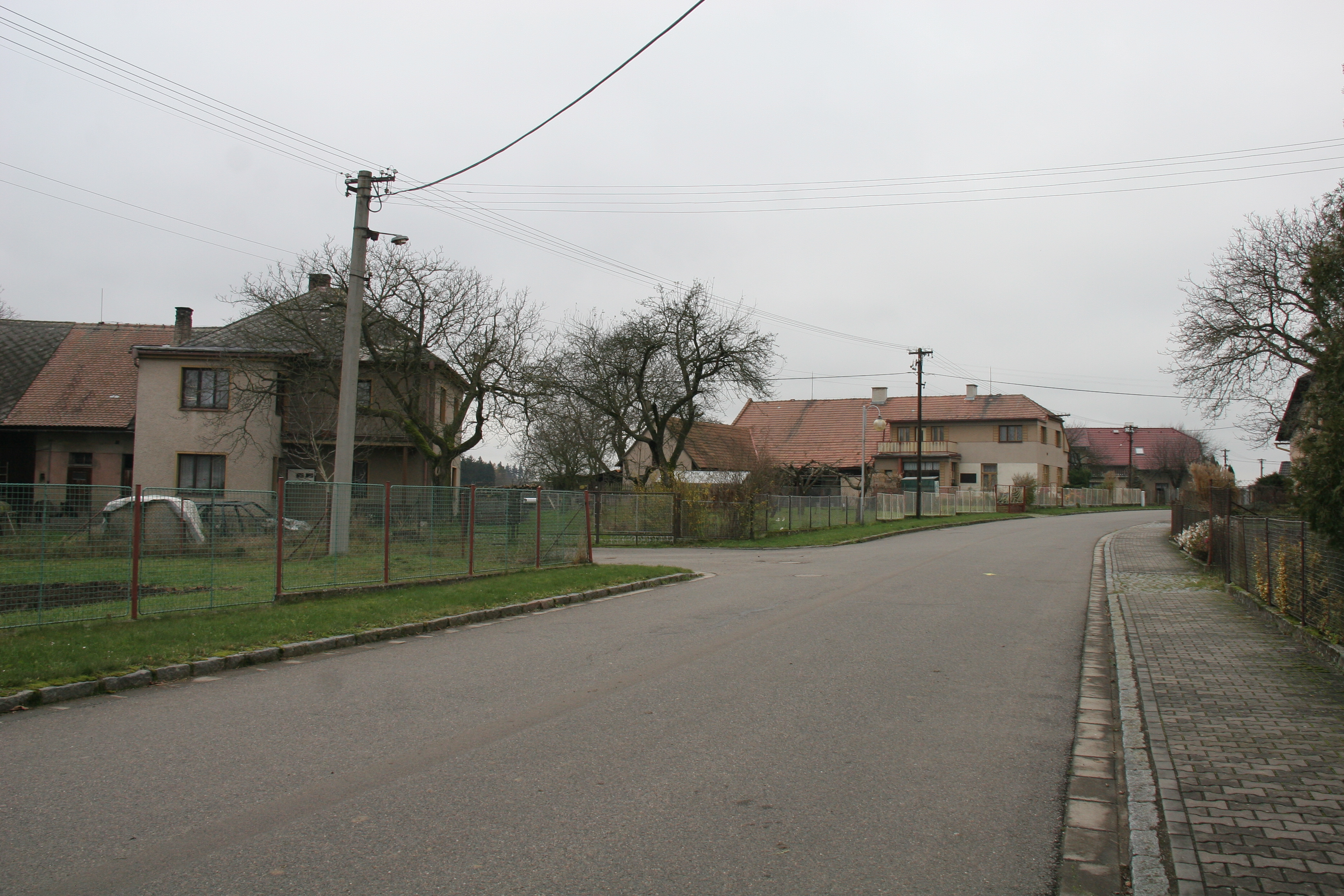
- A street in Křižanovice

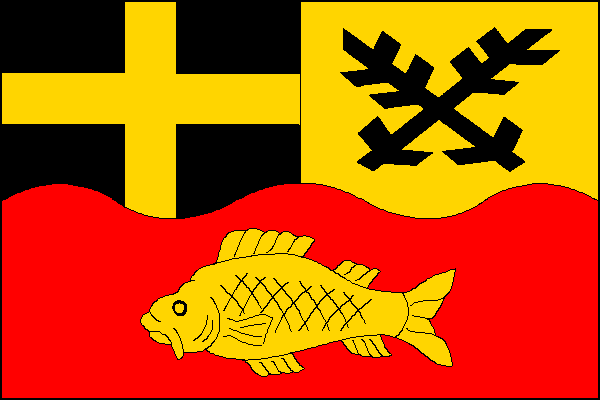
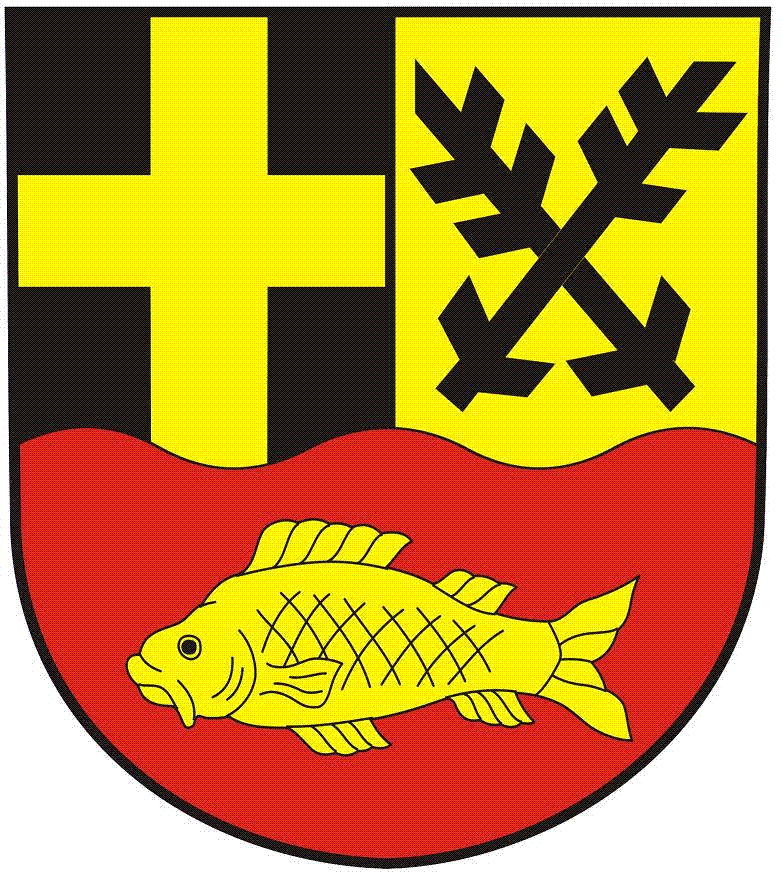
- Flag Coat of arms

- Location in the Czech Republic
- Coordinates: 49°51′34″N 15°45′42″E
- Country: Czech Republic
- Region: Pardubice
- District: Chrudim
- First mentioned: 1329

Area
  - Total: 3.13 km^{2} (1.21 sq mi)
- Elevation: 480 m (1,570 ft)

Population (2026-01-01)
  - Total: 123
  - Density: 39.3/km^{2} (102/sq mi)
- Time zone: UTC+1 (CET)
  - Summer (DST): UTC+2 (CEST)
- Postal code: 538 21
- Website: www.krizanovice.net

Křižanovice is a municipality and village in Chrudim District in the Pardubice Region of the Czech Republic. It has about 100 inhabitants.

== Demographics ==
Historical population
| Year | Pop. | ±% |
|---|---|---|
| 1869 | 155 | — |
| 1880 | 161 | +3.9% |
| 1890 | 180 | +11.8% |
| 1900 | 181 | +0.6% |
| 1910 | 165 | −8.8% |
| 1921 | 175 | +6.1% |
| 1930 | 165 | −5.7% |
| 1950 | 301 | +82.4% |
| 1961 | 173 | −42.5% |
| 1970 | 159 | −8.1% |
| 1980 | 132 | −17.0% |
| 1991 | 118 | −10.6% |
| 2001 | 118 | +0.0% |
| 2011 | 105 | −11.0% |
| 2021 | 123 | +17.1% |
Source: Censuses
