= Podmyče =

- Municipality
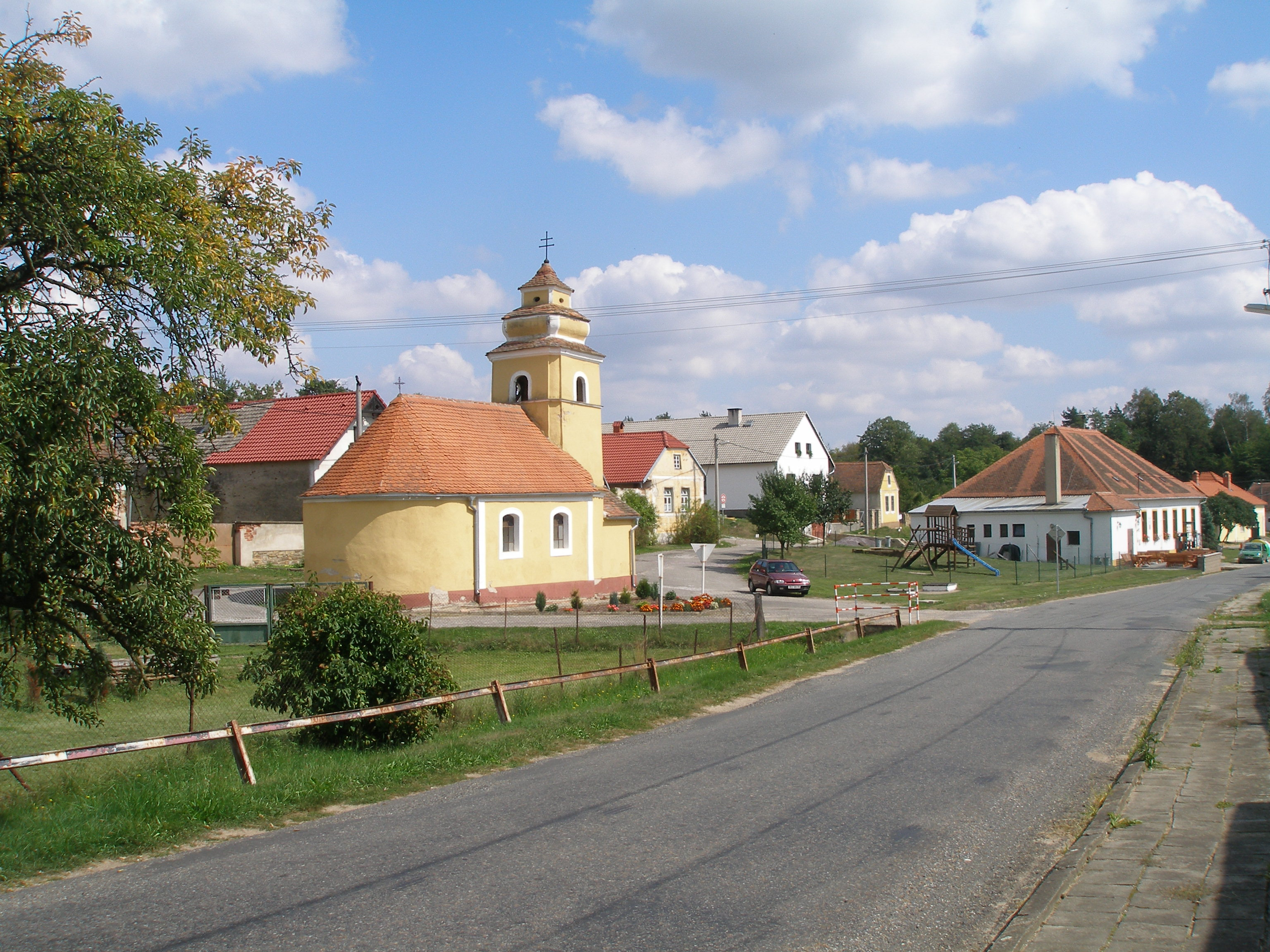
- Centre of Podmyče

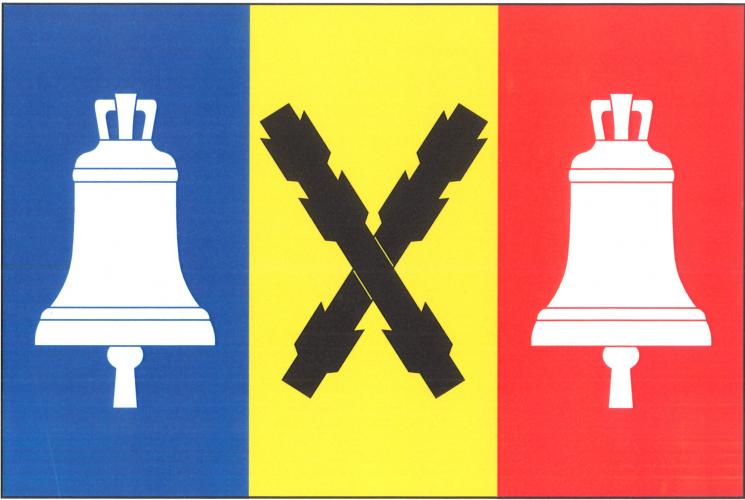
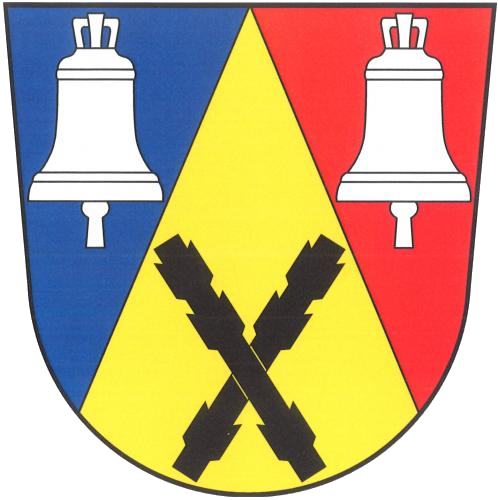
- Flag Coat of arms

- Location in the Czech Republic
- Coordinates: 48°53′16″N 15°46′56″E
- Country: Czech Republic
- Region: South Moravian
- District: Znojmo
- First mentioned: 1323

Area
  - Total: 5.66 km^{2} (2.19 sq mi)
- Elevation: 440 m (1,440 ft)

Population (2026-01-01)
  - Total: 111
  - Density: 19.6/km^{2} (50.8/sq mi)
- Time zone: UTC+1 (CET)
  - Summer (DST): UTC+2 (CEST)
- Postal code: 671 06
- Website: www.obecpodmyce.cz

Podmyče is a municipality and village in Znojmo District in the South Moravian Region of the Czech Republic. It has about 100 inhabitants.

Podmyče lies approximately 19 kilometres (12 mi) west of Znojmo, 71 km (44 mi) south-west of Brno, and 166 km (103 mi) south-east of Prague.

== Demographics ==
Historical population
Year	Pop.	±%
1869	231	—
1880	273	+18.2%
1890	273	+0.0%
1900	280	+2.6%
1910	285	+1.8%
1921	284	−0.4%
1930	323	+13.7%
1950	215	−33.4%
1961	218	+1.4%
1970	165	−24.3%
1980	169	+2.4%
1991	134	−20.7%
2001	98	−26.9%
2011	90	−8.2%
2021	103	+14.4%
Source: Censuses
