= Bojanov =

- Market town
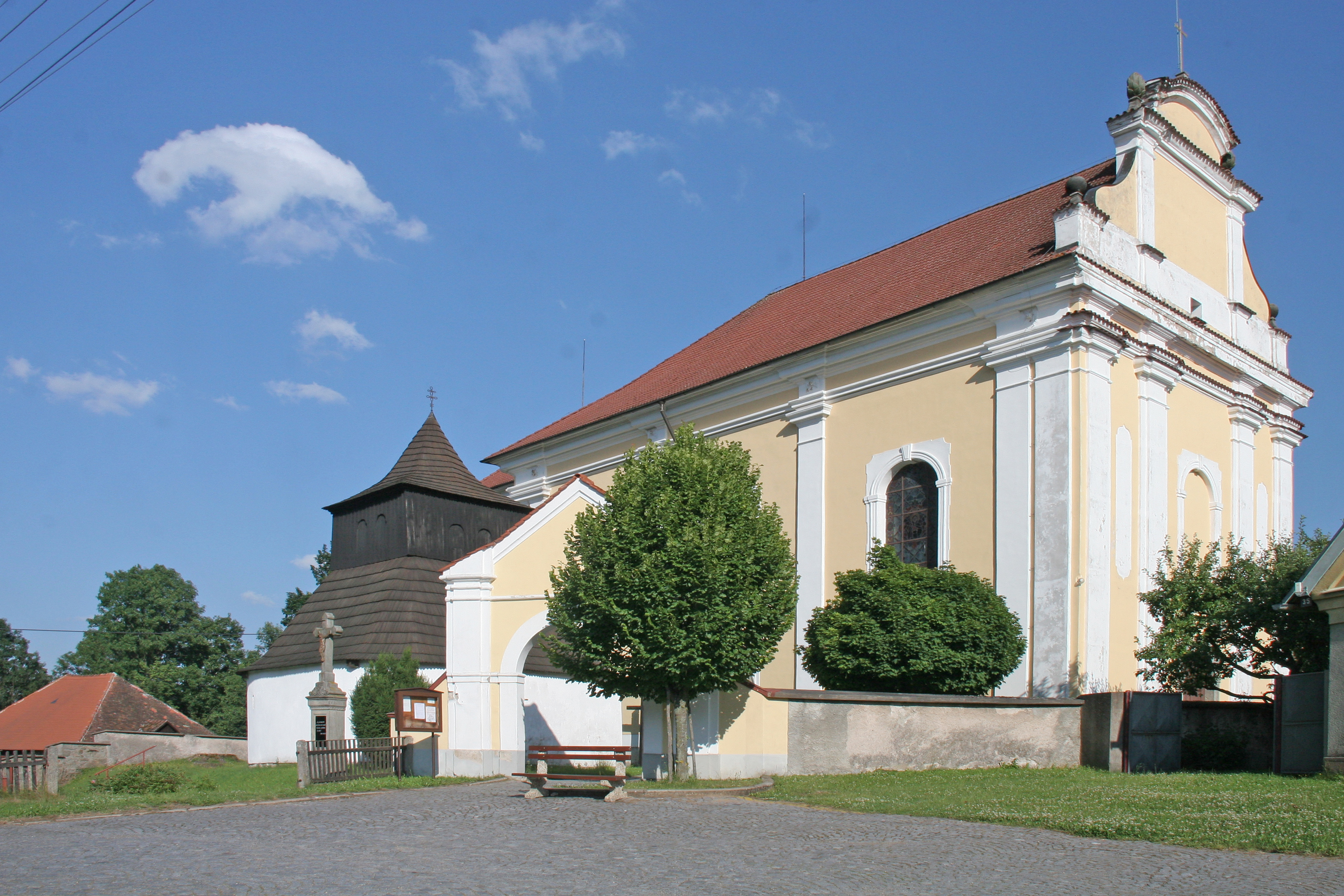
- Church of Saint Vitus

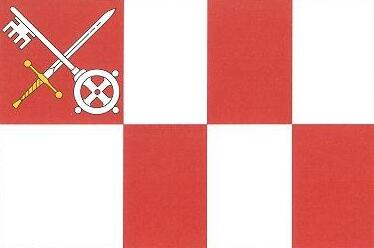
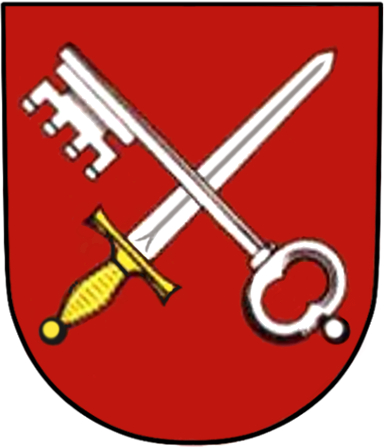
- Flag Coat of arms

- Location in the Czech Republic
- Coordinates: 49°50′29″N 15°42′18″E
- Country: Czech Republic
- Region: Pardubice
- District: Chrudim
- First mentioned: 1126

Area
  - Total: 17.82 km^{2} (6.88 sq mi)
- Elevation: 428 m (1,404 ft)

Population (2026-01-01)
  - Total: 648
  - Density: 36.4/km^{2} (94.2/sq mi)
- Time zone: UTC+1 (CET)
  - Summer (DST): UTC+2 (CEST)
- Postal codes: 538 07, 538 26
- Website: www.bojanov.cz

Bojanov (Czech pronunciation: [ˈbojanof]) is a market town in Chrudim District in the Pardubice Region of the Czech Republic. It has about 600 inhabitants.

== Administrative division ==
Bojanov consists of eight municipal parts (in brackets population according to the 2021 census):

- Bojanov (247)
- Holín (28)
- Hořelec (28)
- Horní Bezděkov (104)
- Hrbokov (76)
- Hůrka (25)
- Kovářov (91)
- Petrkov (20)

== Etymology ==
The name Bojanov is derived from the personal name Bojan, meaning "Bojan's (court)".

== Geography ==
Bojanov is located about 13 kilometres (8 mi) southwest of Chrudim and 21 km (13 mi) south of Pardubice. It lies in the Iron Mountains. The highest point is the hill Na Hranicích at 565 m (1,854 ft) above sea level. The Chrudimka River flows through the territory.

== History ==
Bojanov is one of the oldest settlements in the Iron Mountains area. The first written mention of the settlement is from 1126, when it belonged to the monastery in Vilémov. In 1329, it became a part of Lichnice Castle estate owned by Jindřich of Lichtemberk. In the 15th century, Bojanov belonged to the Oheb Castle. In 1564, Bojanov was referred to as a market town for the first time, with its own coat of arms.

== Demographics ==
Historical population

Year	Pop.	±%
1869	1,297	—
1880	1,307	+0.8%
1890	1,262	−3.4%
1900	1,196	−5.2%
1910	1,187	−0.8%

Year	Pop.	±%
1921	1,141	−3.9%
1930	1,150	+0.8%
1950	914	−20.5%
1961	957	+4.7%
1970	880	−8.0%

Year	Pop.	±%
1980	777	−11.7%
1991	701	−9.8%
2001	656	−6.4%
2011	603	−8.1%
2021	619	+2.7%

Source: Censuses

== Transport ==
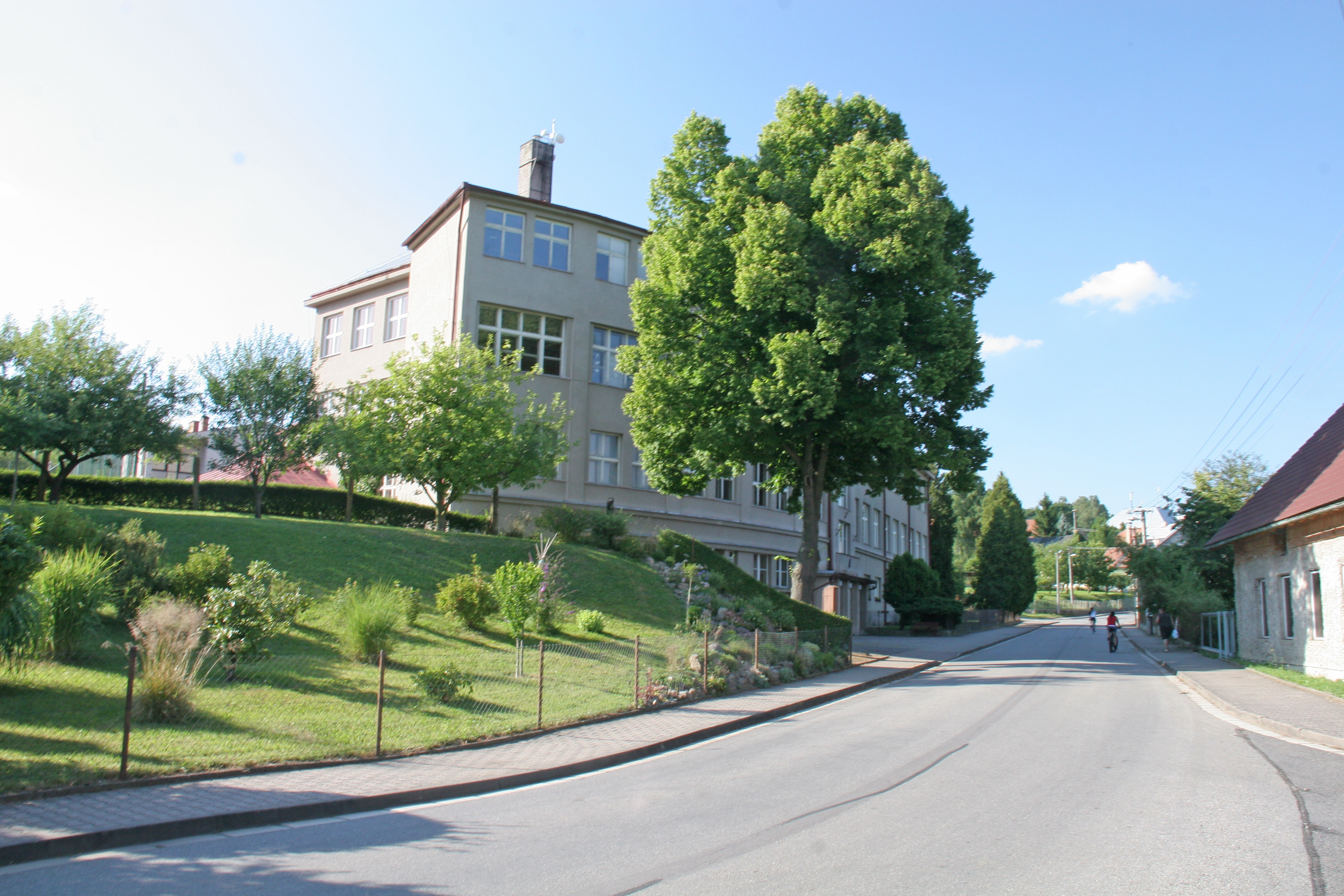
Primary school by the main road

There are no railways or major roads passing through the municipal territory.

== Sights ==
The Church of Saint Vitus was built in the Baroque style in 1730. It has a separate wooden bell tower.

The Church of Saint Wenceslaus in Hrbokov was built in 1920–1922 on the site of a demolished Empire church from the second half of the 19th century.
