= Mantica (surname) =

Mantica is a surname. Notable people with the surname include:

- Alfredo Mantica (born 1943), Italian politician
- Francesco Mantica (1534–1614), Roman Catholic cardinal
- Germanicus Mantica (died 1639), Italian Roman Catholic bishop
