= Alexander Meduna =

Alexander Meduna (born 1957 in Olomouc, Czech Republic) is a theoretical computer scientist and expert on compiler design, formal languages and automata. He is a professor of Computer Science at the Brno University of Technology. Formerly, he taught theoretical computer science at various European and American universities, including the University of Missouri, where he spent a decade teaching advanced topics of formal language theory. He is the author of several books and over sixty papers related to the subject matter.

Meduna is also an artist, who is primarily interested in visual art. He had several exhibitions in the USA and Europe. He often performs poetry reading as well.

== Publications ==
- Meduna, Alexander (2000). Automata and Languages: Theory and Applications. Springer Science & Business Media. ISBN 9781852330743.
- Meduna, Alexander (2007). Elements of Compiler Design. CRC Press. ISBN 9781420063233.
- Meduna, Alexander (2014). Formal Languages and Computation: Models and Their Applications. CRC Press. ISBN 9781466513457.
- Meduna, Alexander; Švec, Martin (2005). Grammars with Context Conditions and Their Applications. John Wiley & Sons. ISBN 9780471736554.
- Meduna, Alexander; Techet, Jiří (2010). Scattered Context Grammars and Their Applications. WIT Press. ISBN 9781845644260.
- Meduna, Alexander; Zemek, Petr (2014). Regulated Grammars and Automata. Springer. ISBN 9781493903696.
- Meduna, Alexander; Soukup, Ondřej (2017). Modern Language Models and Computation: Theory with Applications. Springer. ISBN 9783319630991.
- Meduna, Alexander; Horáček, Petr; Tomko, Martin (2019). Handbook of Mathematical Models for Languages and Computation. The Institution of Engineering and Technology. ISBN 978-1-78561-659-4.
