= Liboměřice =

Municipality in the Czech Republic

- Municipality
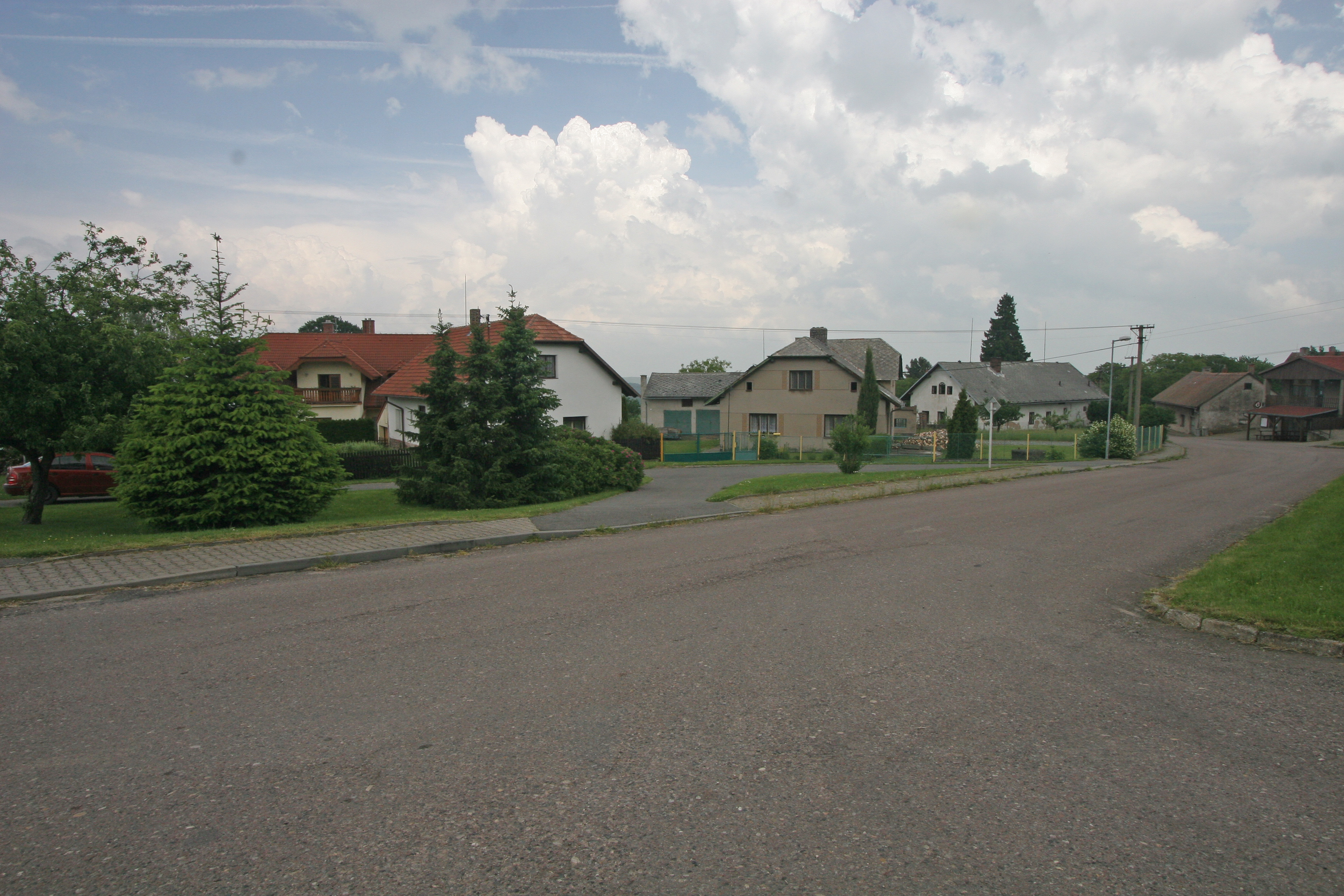
- Centre of Liboměřice

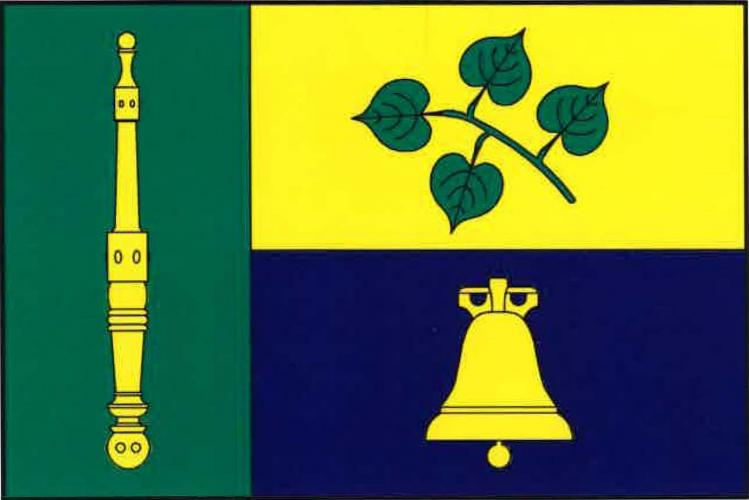
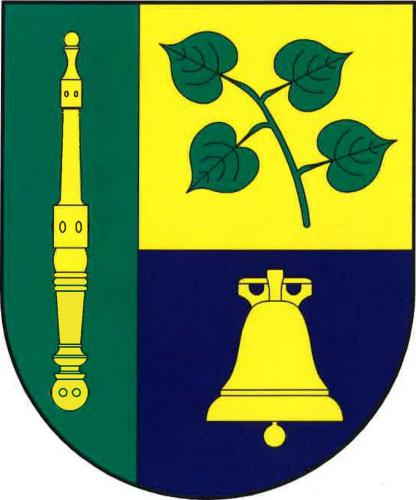
- Flag Coat of arms

- Location in the Czech Republic
- Coordinates: 49°52′19″N 15°44′29″E
- Country: Czech Republic
- Region: Pardubice
- District: Chrudim
- First mentioned: 1547

Area
  - Total: 6.49 km^{2} (2.51 sq mi)
- Elevation: 463 m (1,519 ft)

Population (2026-01-01)
  - Total: 183
  - Density: 28.2/km^{2} (73.0/sq mi)
- Time zone: UTC+1 (CET)
  - Summer (DST): UTC+2 (CEST)
- Postal codes: 538 07, 538 21
- Website: www.obeclibomerice.cz

Liboměřice is a municipality and village in Chrudim District in the Pardubice Region of the Czech Republic. It has about 200 inhabitants.

== Administrative division ==
Liboměřice consists of four municipal parts (in brackets population according to the 2021 census):

- Liboměřice (95)
- Nové Lhotice (26)
- Pohořalka (19)
- Samařov (26)

== Demographics ==
Historical population
Year	Pop.	±%
1869	352	—
1880	322	−8.5%
1890	350	+8.7%
1900	319	−8.9%
1910	327	+2.5%
1921	317	−3.1%
1930	301	−5.0%
1950	232	−22.9%
1961	234	+0.9%
1970	184	−21.4%
1980	153	−16.8%
1991	142	−7.2%
2001	127	−10.6%
2011	151	+18.9%
2021	166	+9.9%
Source: Censuses
