= Petroupim =

- Municipality
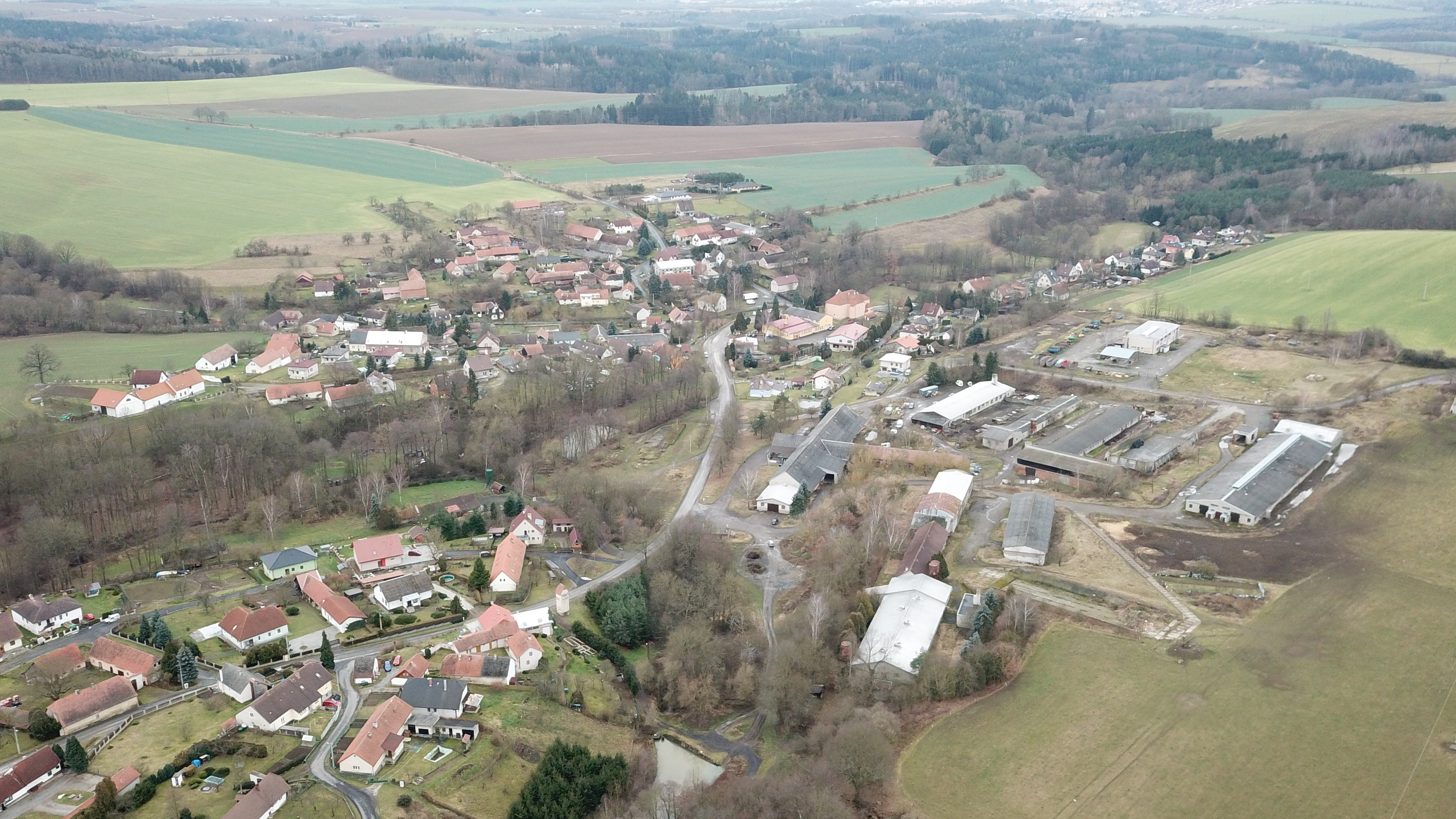
- Aerial view

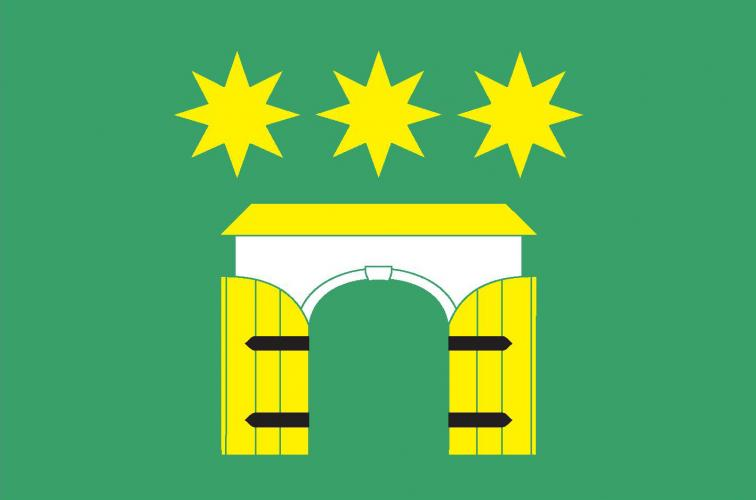
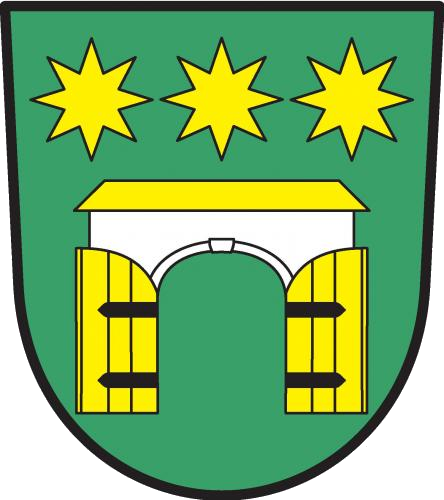
- Flag Coat of arms

- Location in the Czech Republic
- Coordinates: 49°48′30″N 14°45′10″E
- Country: Czech Republic
- Region: Central Bohemian
- District: Benešov
- First mentioned: 1318

Area
  - Total: 9.51 km^{2} (3.67 sq mi)
- Elevation: 346 m (1,135 ft)

Population (2026-01-01)
  - Total: 374
  - Density: 39.3/km^{2} (102/sq mi)
- Time zone: UTC+1 (CET)
  - Summer (DST): UTC+2 (CEST)
- Postal code: 256 01
- Website: www.petroupim.cz

Petroupim is a municipality and village in Benešov District in the Central Bohemian Region of the Czech Republic. It has about 400 inhabitants.

== Administrative division ==
Petroupim consists of three municipal parts (in brackets population according to the 2021 census):

- Petroupim (230)
- Petroupec (42)
- Sembratec (20)

== Demographics ==
Historical population
Year	Pop.	±%
1869	480	—
1880	501	+4.4%
1890	486	−3.0%
1900	476	−2.1%
1910	457	−4.0%
1921	447	−2.2%
1930	413	−7.6%
1950	317	−23.2%
1961	303	−4.4%
1970	267	−11.9%
1980	267	+0.0%
1991	281	+5.2%
2001	290	+3.2%
2011	305	+5.2%
2021	292	−4.3%
Source: Censuses
