= Casella =

Casella may refer to:

== People ==
- Casella (Divine Comedy) (died 1299), Italian composer and singer, none of whose works have survived
- Alessandra Casella (active 1983–2019), Italian economist, researcher, professor and author
- Alessandra Casella (actress) (born 1963), Italian actress, comedian and television presenter
- Alfredo Casella (1883–1947), Italian composer, pianist and conductor
- Arnaldo Casella Tamburini (1885–1936), Italian artist
- Carlos Casella (active 1988–2015), Argentinian actor, dancer, choreographer and singer
- Cesare Casella (born 1960), Italian chef, restaurateur, writer, consultant and educator
- Felicita Casella (c. 1820 – after 1865), Italian singer and composer of French birth
- Franco Casella (1972–2025), Venezuelan politician
- George Casella (1951–2012), American statistician
- Giovanni Andrea Casella (active 1658), Swiss-Italian painter active in the Baroque period
- Giucas Casella (born 1949), Italian illusionist, hypnotist and television personality
- Hote’ Casella (1909–1990), Native American mezzo-soprano
- Jimmy Casella (1924–1976), poker player
- Karen Casella (active 1983–2017), American software engineer and advocate for inclusion in the technology industry
- Max Casella (born 1967), American actor
- Michel Casella (1940–), Argentinian Judoka
- The Casella Sisters, Ella (1858–1946) and Nelia (1859–1950), British artists

== Places ==
- Casella, Liguria, municipality in Province of Genoa, Italy
- Casella (Asolo), hamlet in municipality of Asolo, Italy

== Companies ==
- Casella Family Brands, Australian maker of Yellow Tail wine
- Casella Waste Systems, US waste management company

== Other ==
- Casella (genus), synonym of Glossodoris, genus of sea slugs
- Casella obsoleta, now known as Goniobranchus obsoletus, species of colourful sea slug

== See also ==
- Gilbert F. Casellas
- Caselle (disambiguation)
- Cassella (disambiguation), similar spelling
