= Duomo =

Type of Catholic cathedral

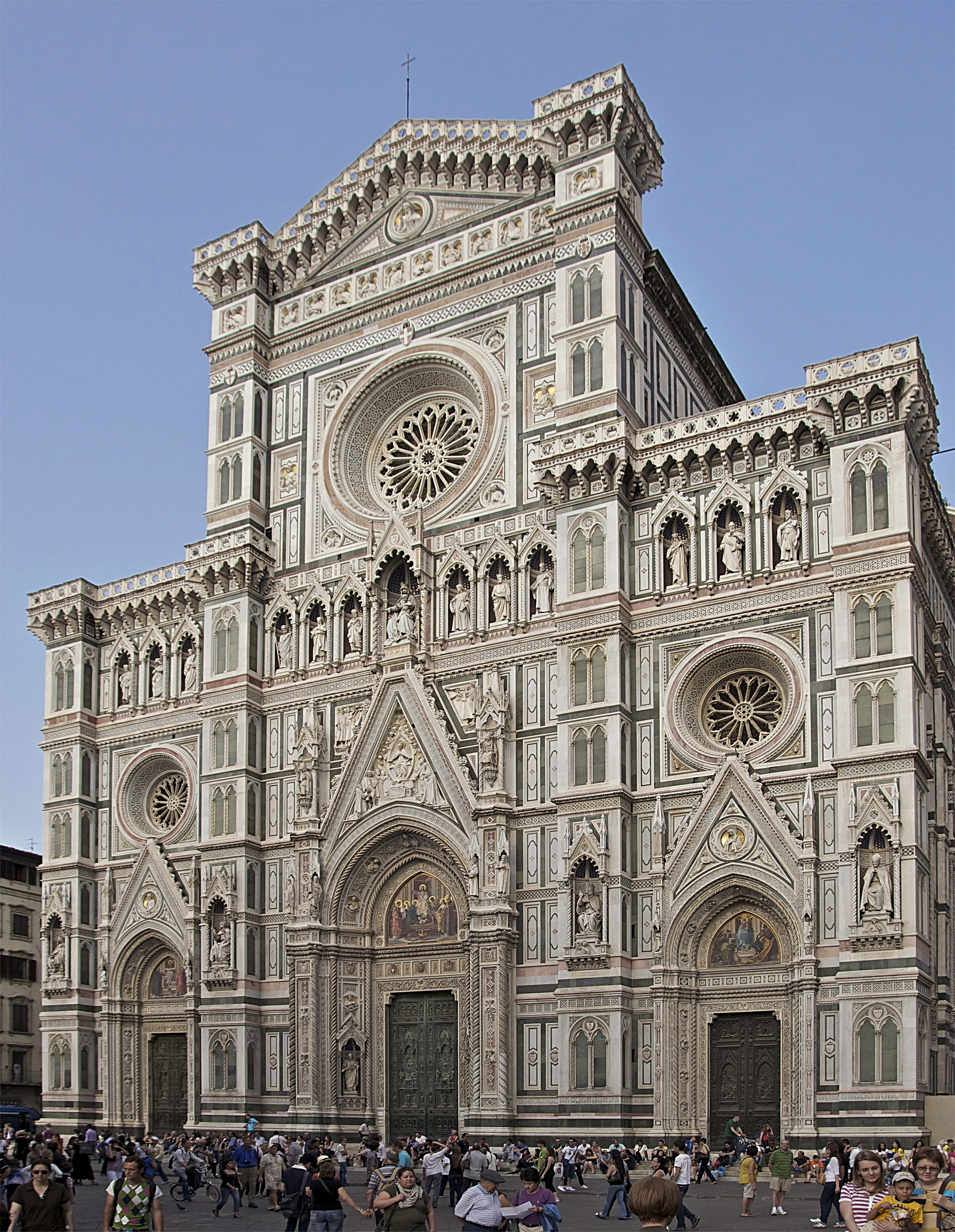
Florence Cathedral

Duomo (English: /ˈdwoʊmoʊ/, Italian: [ˈdwɔːmo]) is an Italian term for the main church of a city or a town, usually with the features of, or having been built to serve as a cathedral, whether or not it currently plays this role. The Duomo of Monza, for example, has never been a diocesan seat and is by definition not a cathedral. In a similar way, the town of Asolo has not had its own bishop since the 10th century, but the main church (rebuilt since then) is still called the Asolo Duomo. By contradistinction, the Italian word for a cathedral sensu stricto is cattedrale. There is no direct translation of "duomo" into English, leading to many such churches being erroneously called "cathedral" in English, regardless of whether the church in question hosts a Catholic bishop. Each city or town will have only one duomo, unless there are different denominations involved.

Locally, people usually use il Duomo, the Duomo, without regard to the full proper name of the church.

Similar words exist in other European languages: Dom (German and Dutch), dom (Romanian), dóm (Hungarian and Slovak), dôme (French - usually less common), domo (Portuguese), doms (Latvian), tum (Polish), domkirke (Danish and Norwegian), dómkirkja (Icelandic), domkyrka (Swedish), toomkirik (Estonian), tuomiokirkko (Finnish) and so on. Also in these languages the respective terms do not necessarily refer to a church functioning as a cathedral, but also to proto-cathedrals or simply prominent church buildings, which have never been a cathedral in the exact sense of that word. German Dom and Polish tum became the synecdoche used – pars pro toto – for most existing or former collegiate churches. Therefore, translation of these terms into English as "cathedrals" may not always be appropriate and should be used on a contextual basis. Generally, only the Italian duomo and the German Dom are likely to be encountered in English.

According to the Oxford English Dictionary and the Zingarelli, the word duomo derives from the Latin word domus, meaning "house", as a cathedral is the "house of God", or domus Dei. The Garzanti online dictionary also gives the etymology as deriving from "house", but "house of the bishop" instead.

Italian cathedrals are often highly decorated and contain notable artworks; in many cases the buildings themselves are true artworks. Perhaps the best known duomo is the one in Florence, but other well-known Catholic cathedrals include the Milan Cathedral and those of Siena, Alba, Ancona, Mantua and Parma.

== Gallery ==
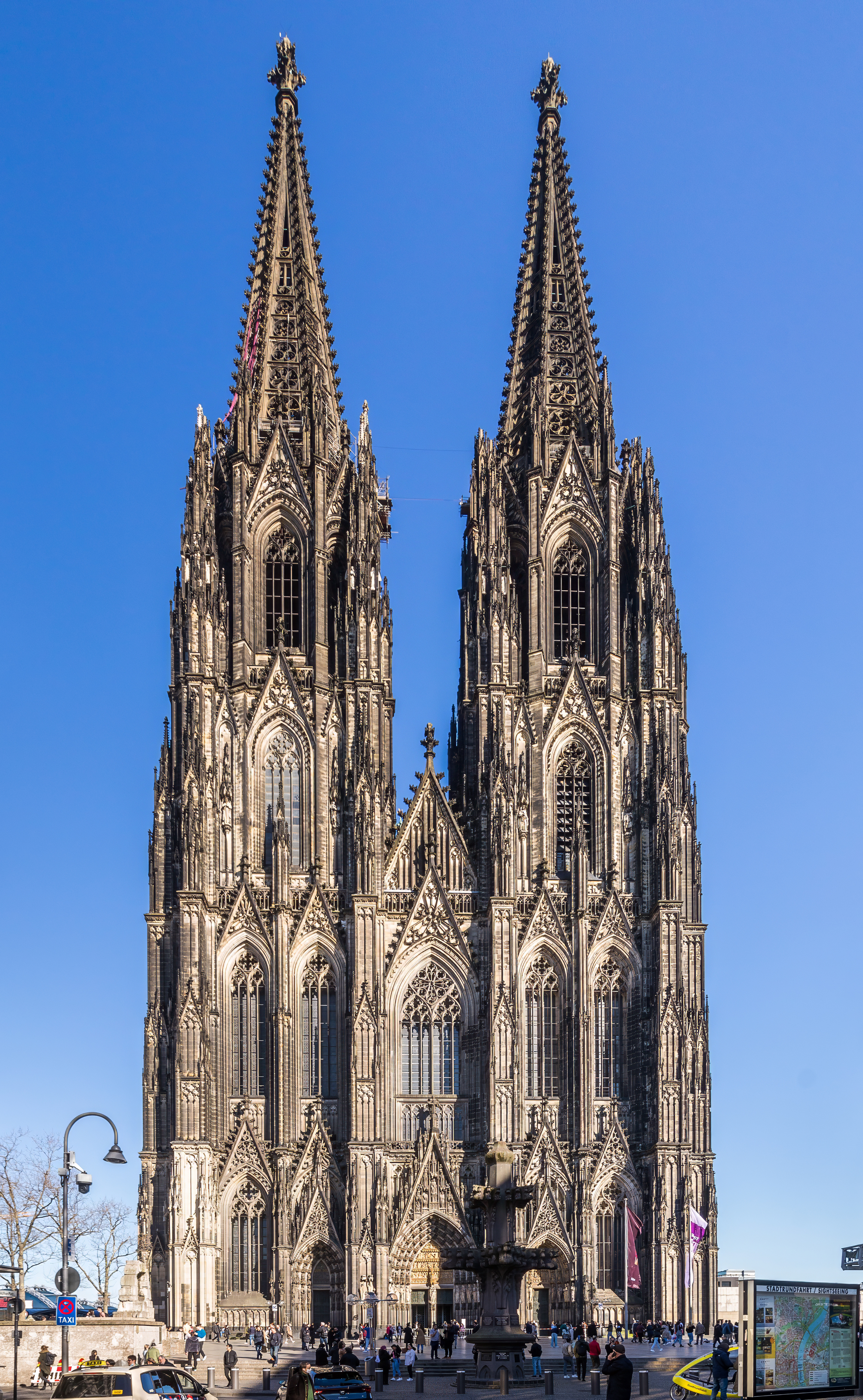
Cologne Cathedral, Germany

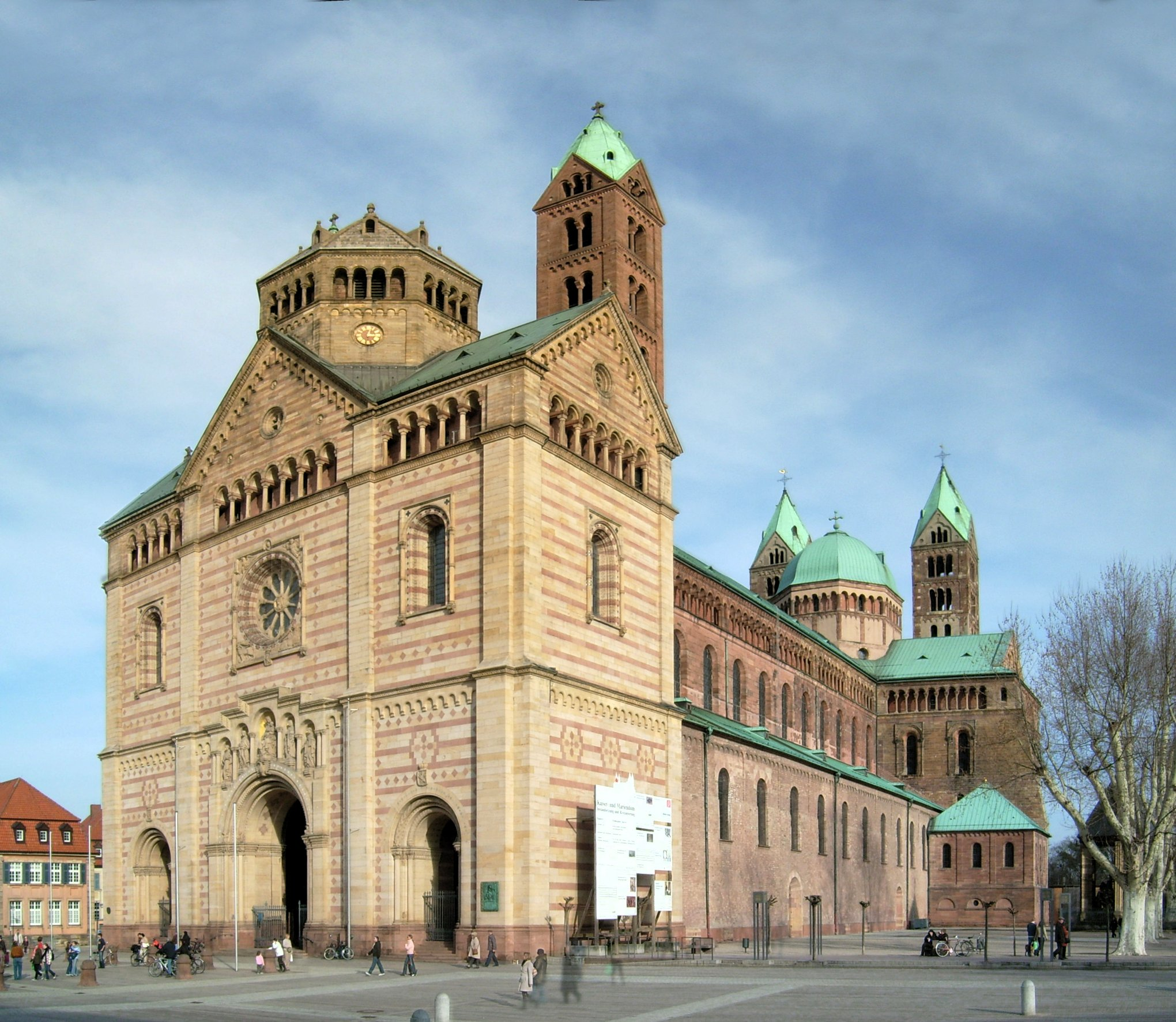
Speyer Cathedral, Germany

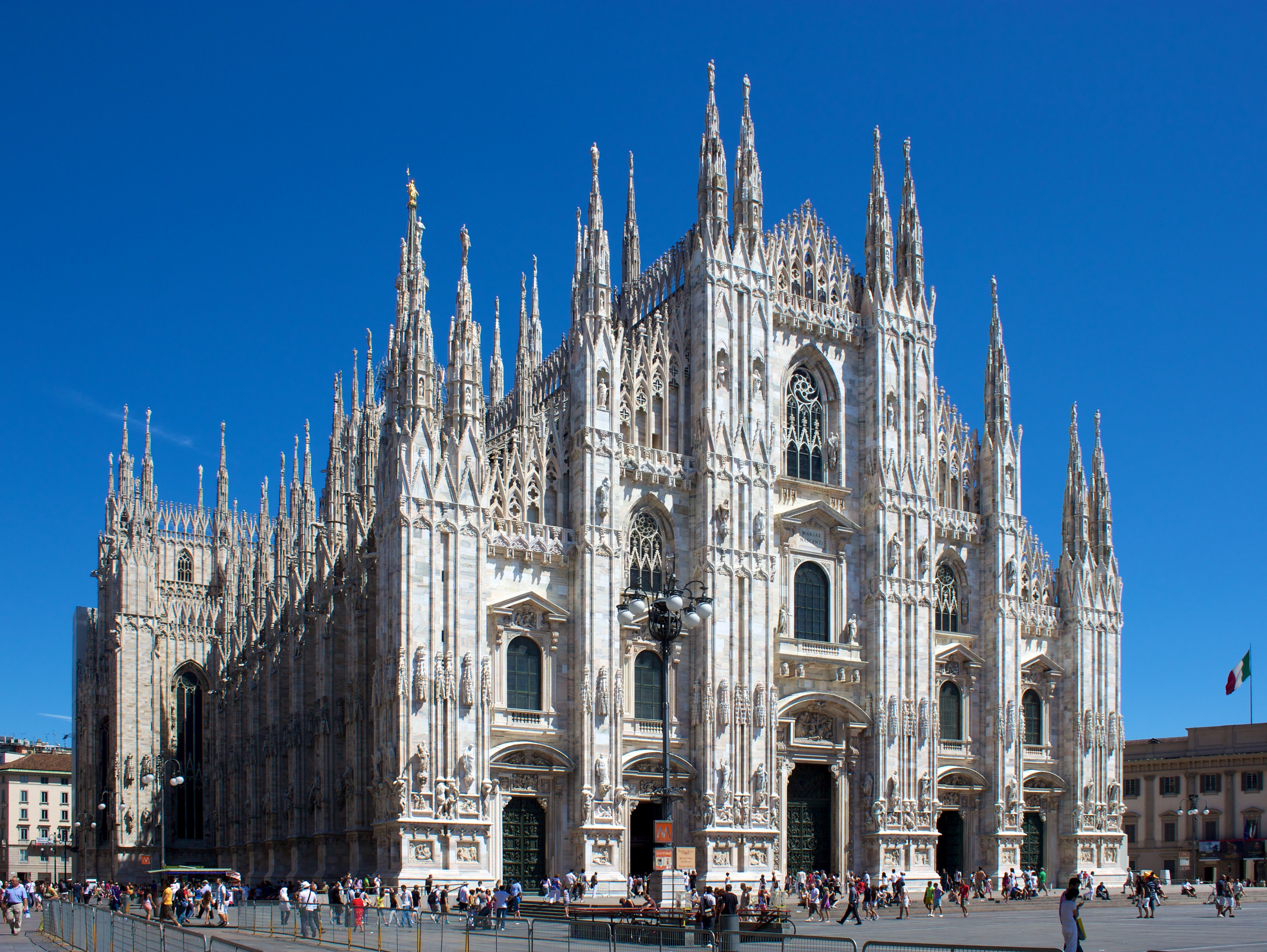
Milan Cathedral, Italy

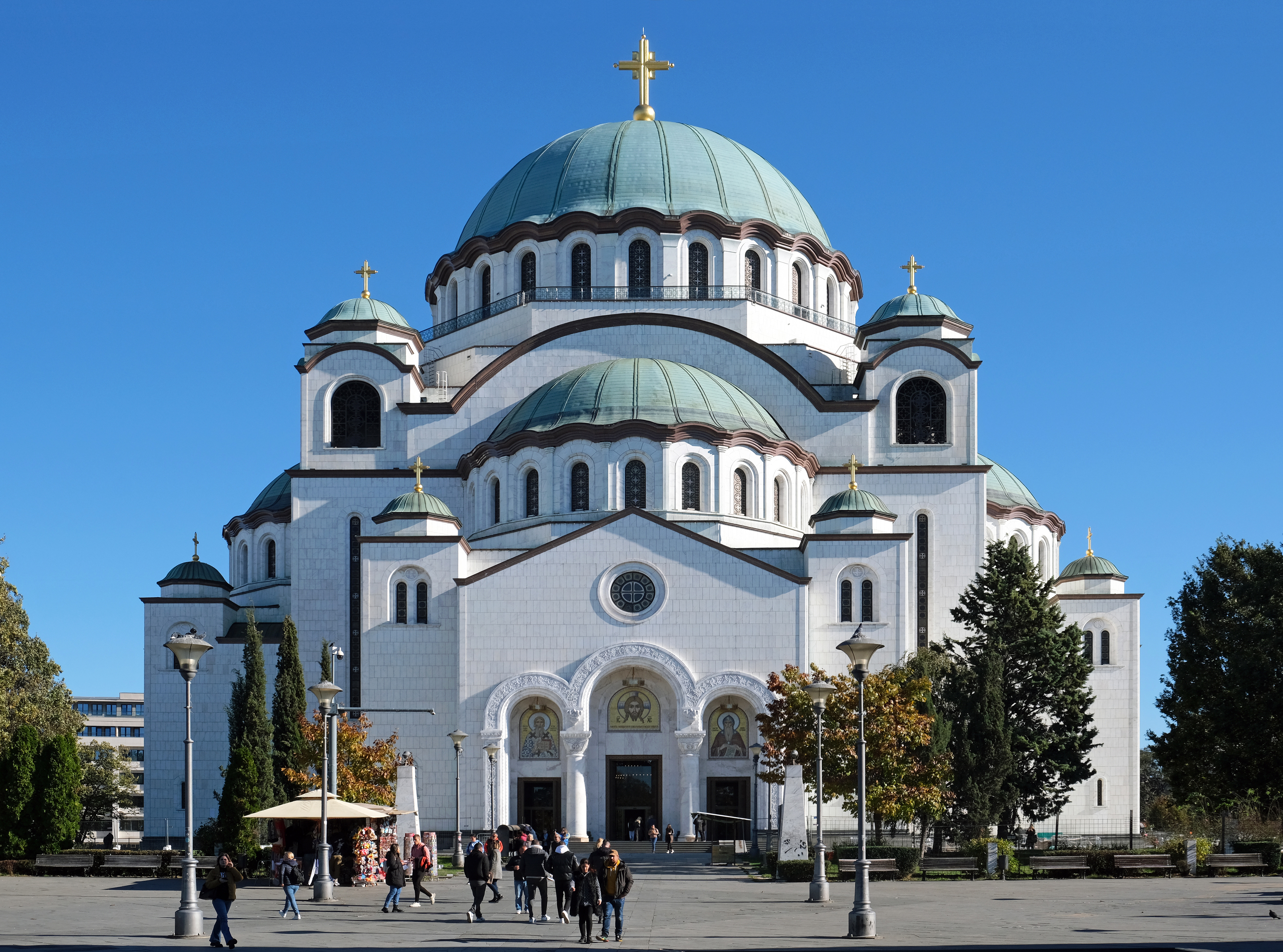
Cathedral of Saint Sava, Serbia

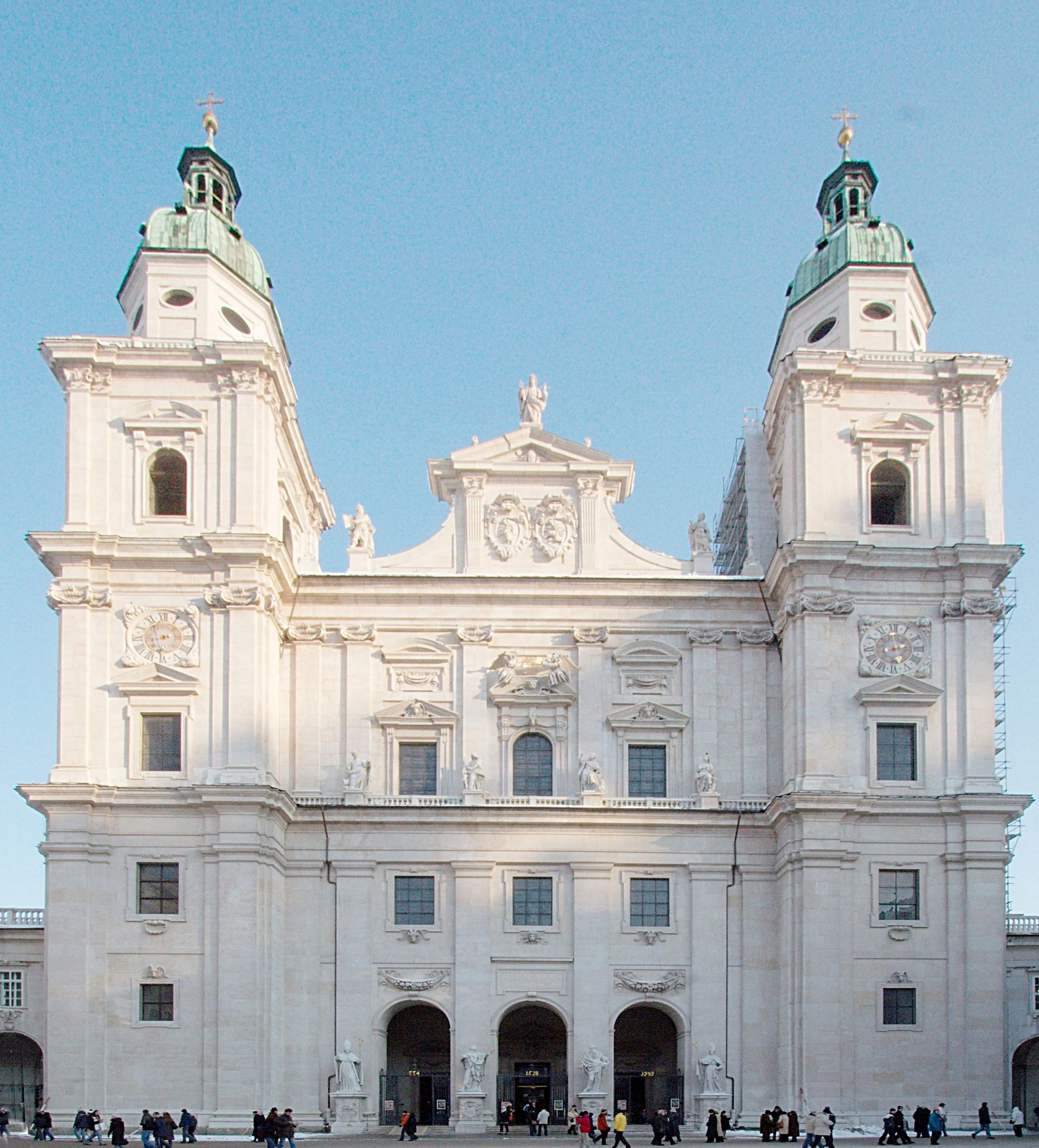
Salzburg Cathedral, Austria

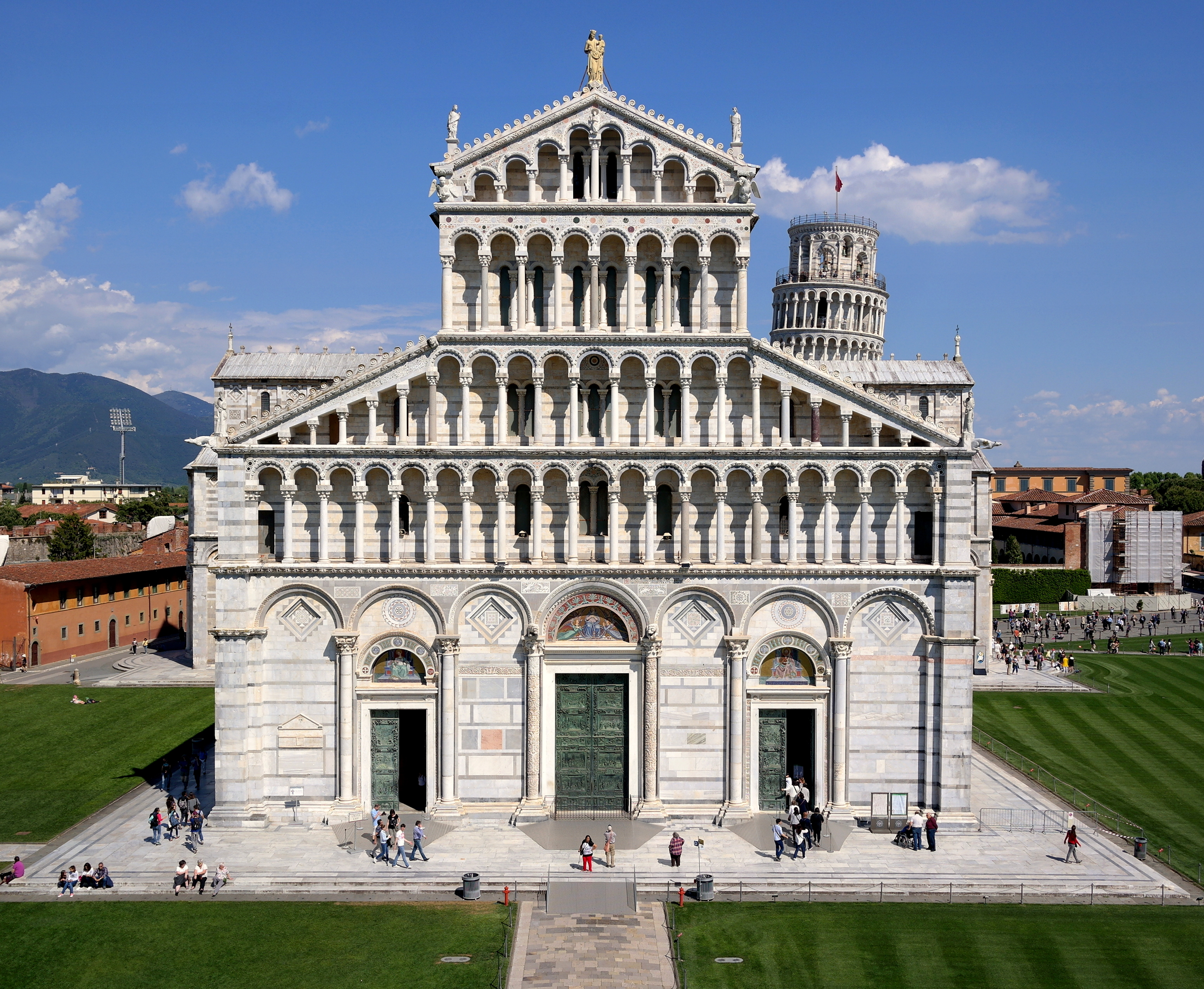
Pisa Cathedral, Italy

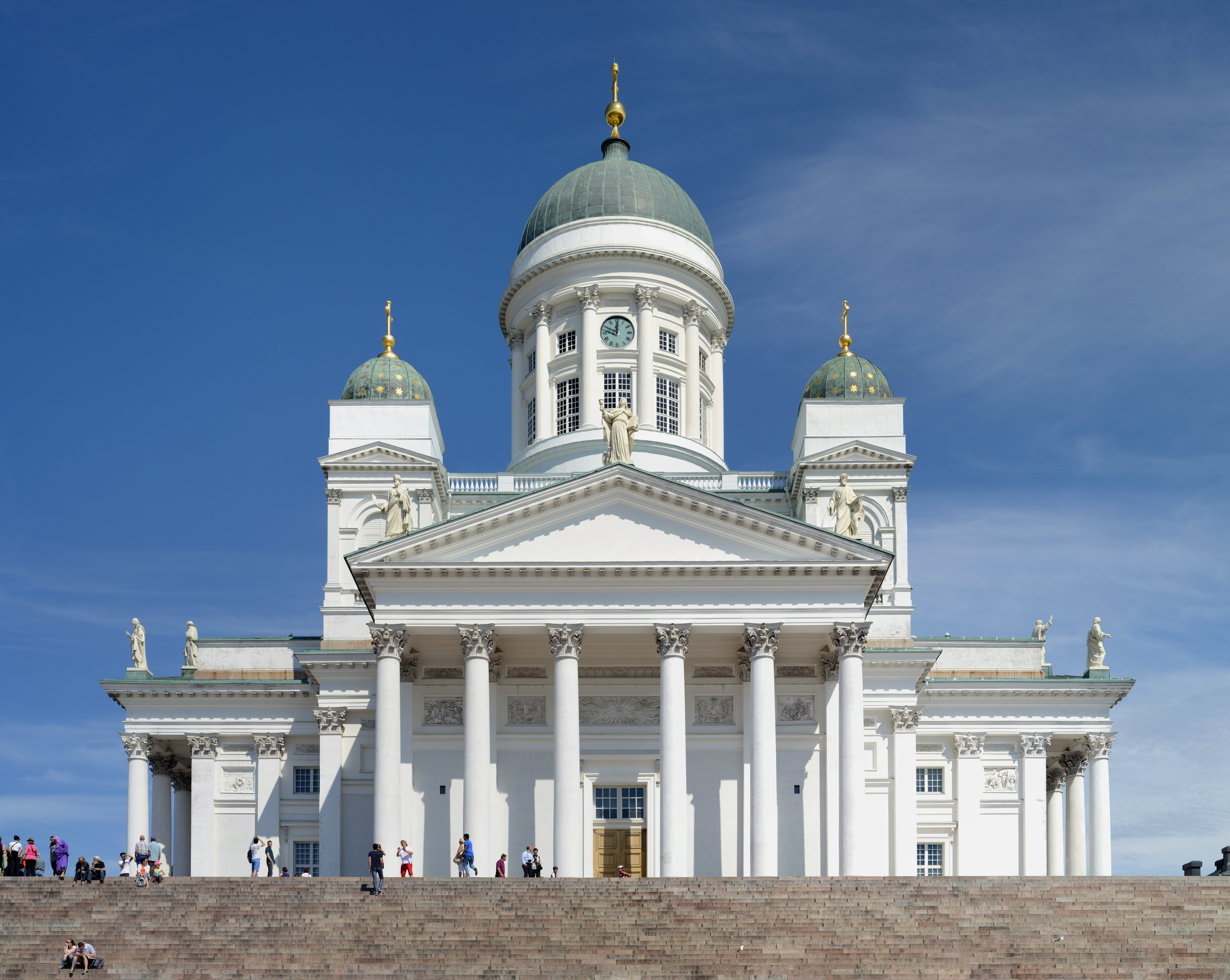
Helsinki Lutheran Cathedral, Finland

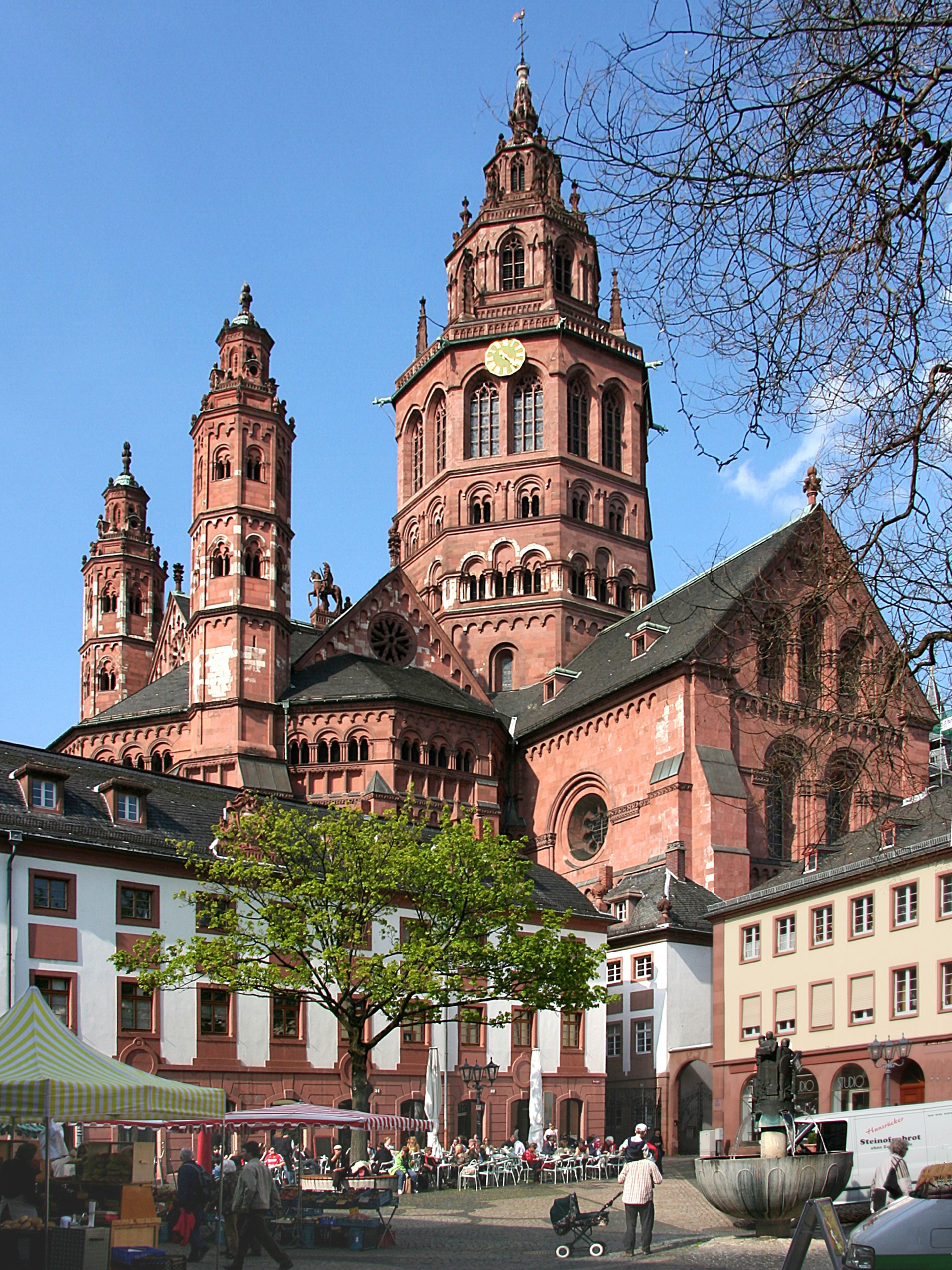
Mainz Cathedral, Germany

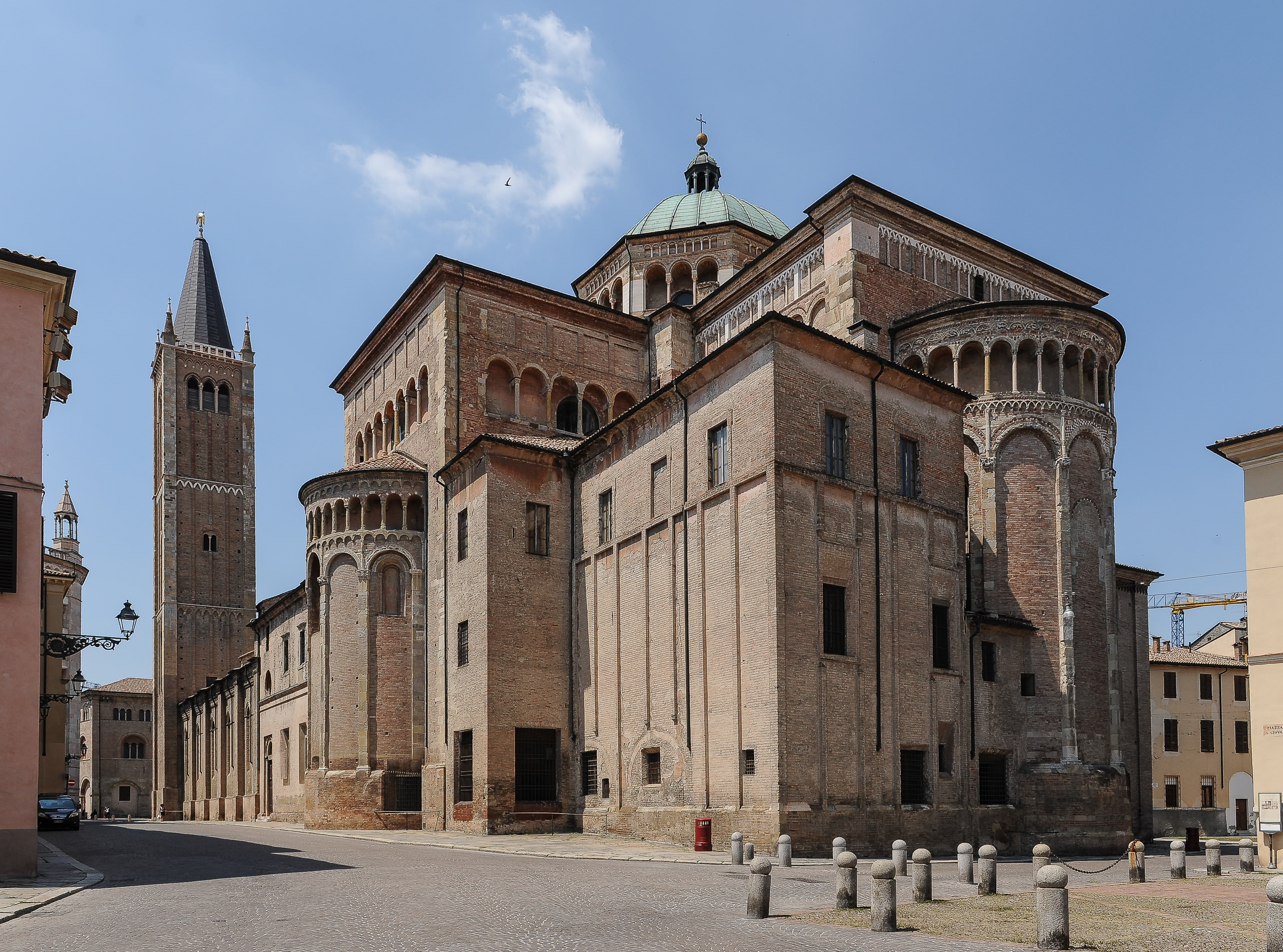
Parma Cathedral, Italy

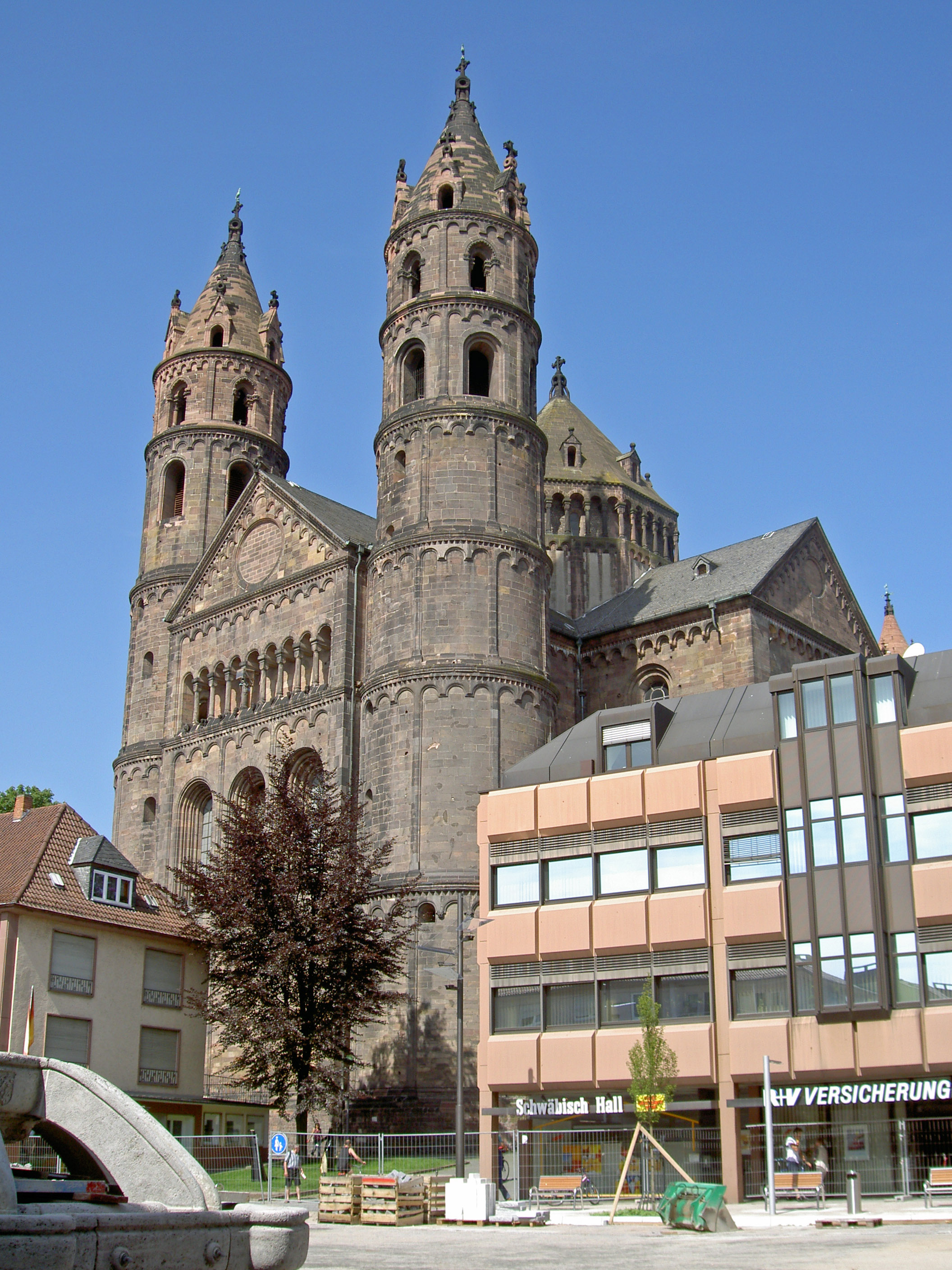
Worms Cathedral, Germany

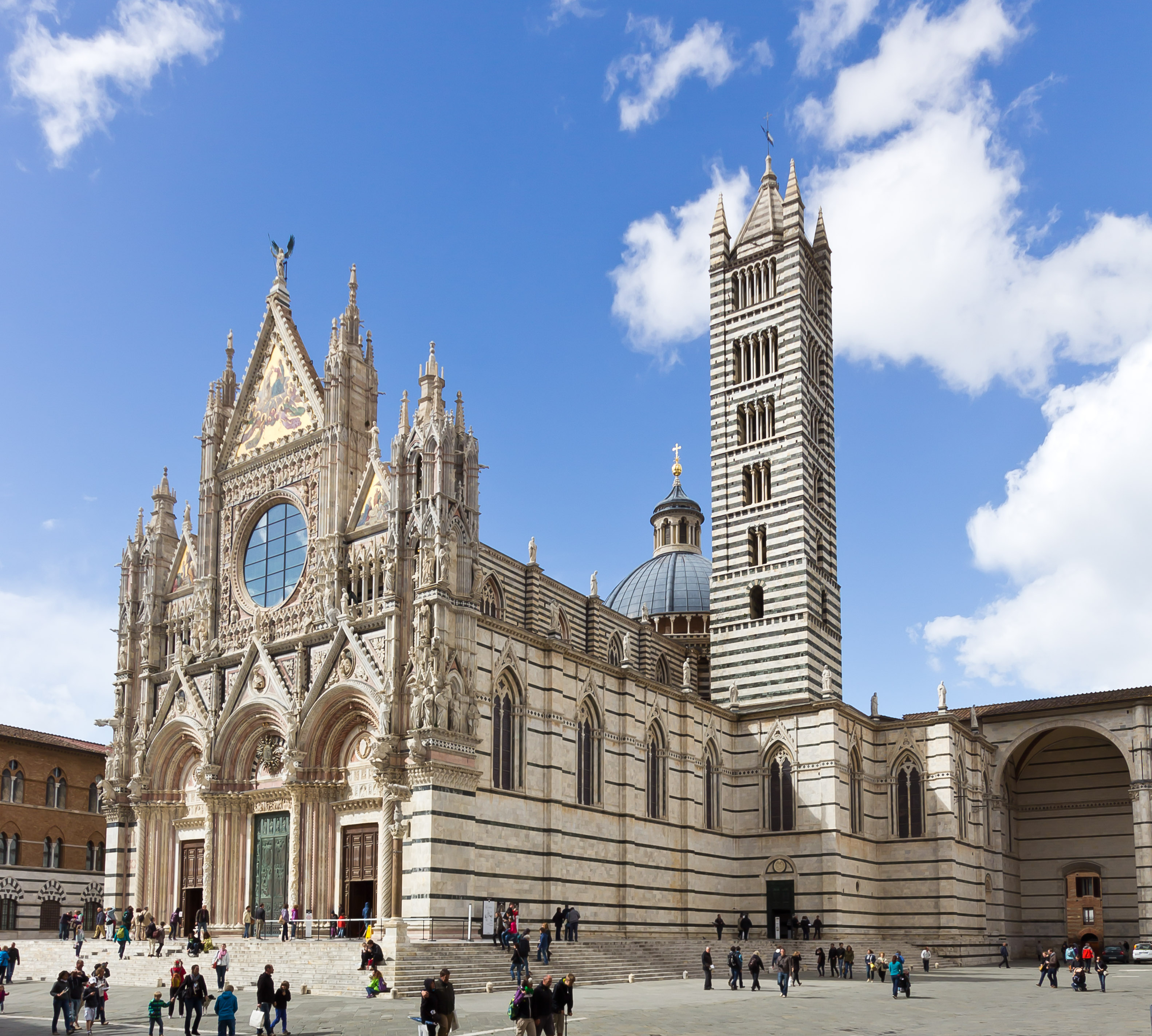
Siena Cathedral, Italy

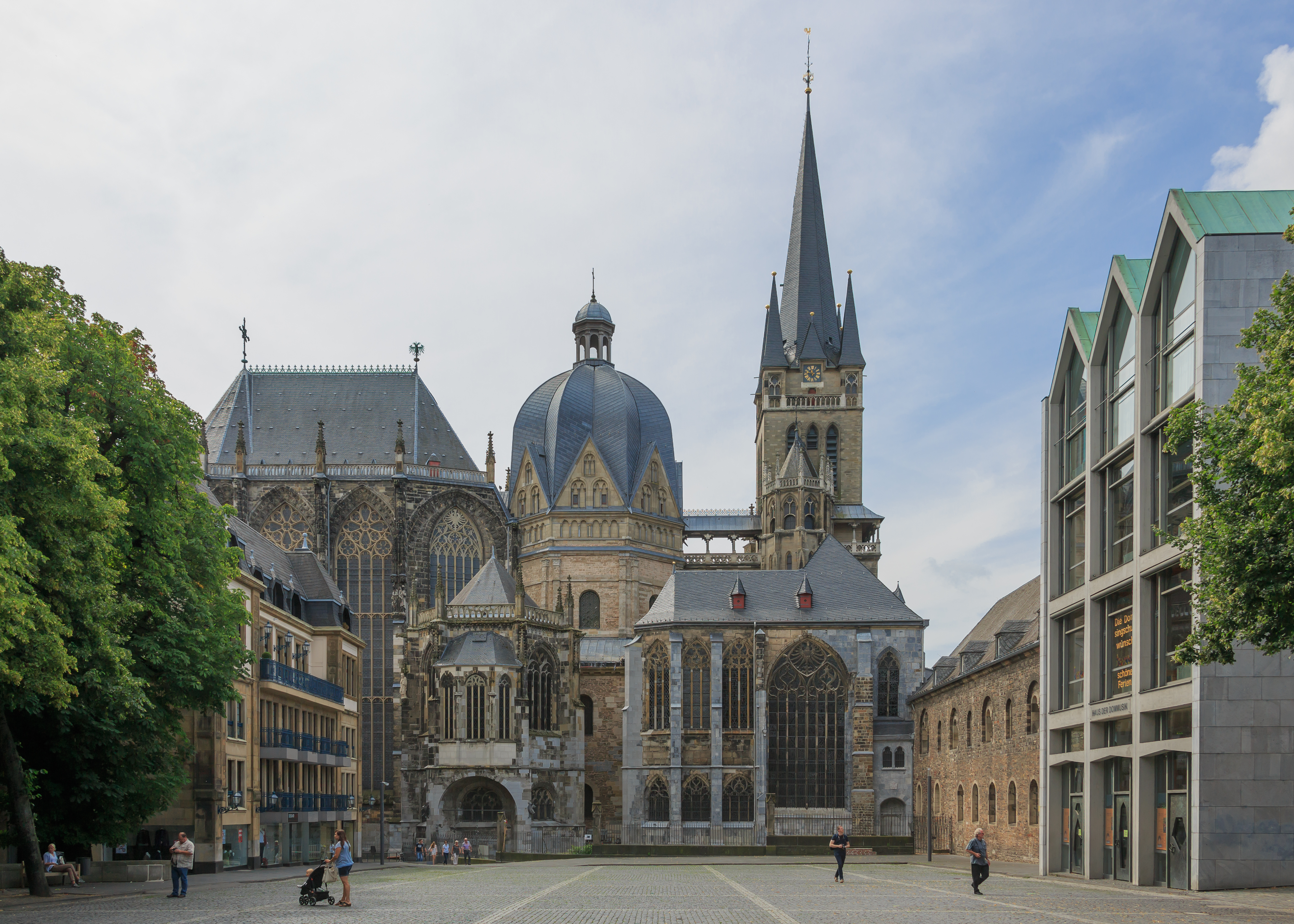
Aachen Cathedral, Germany

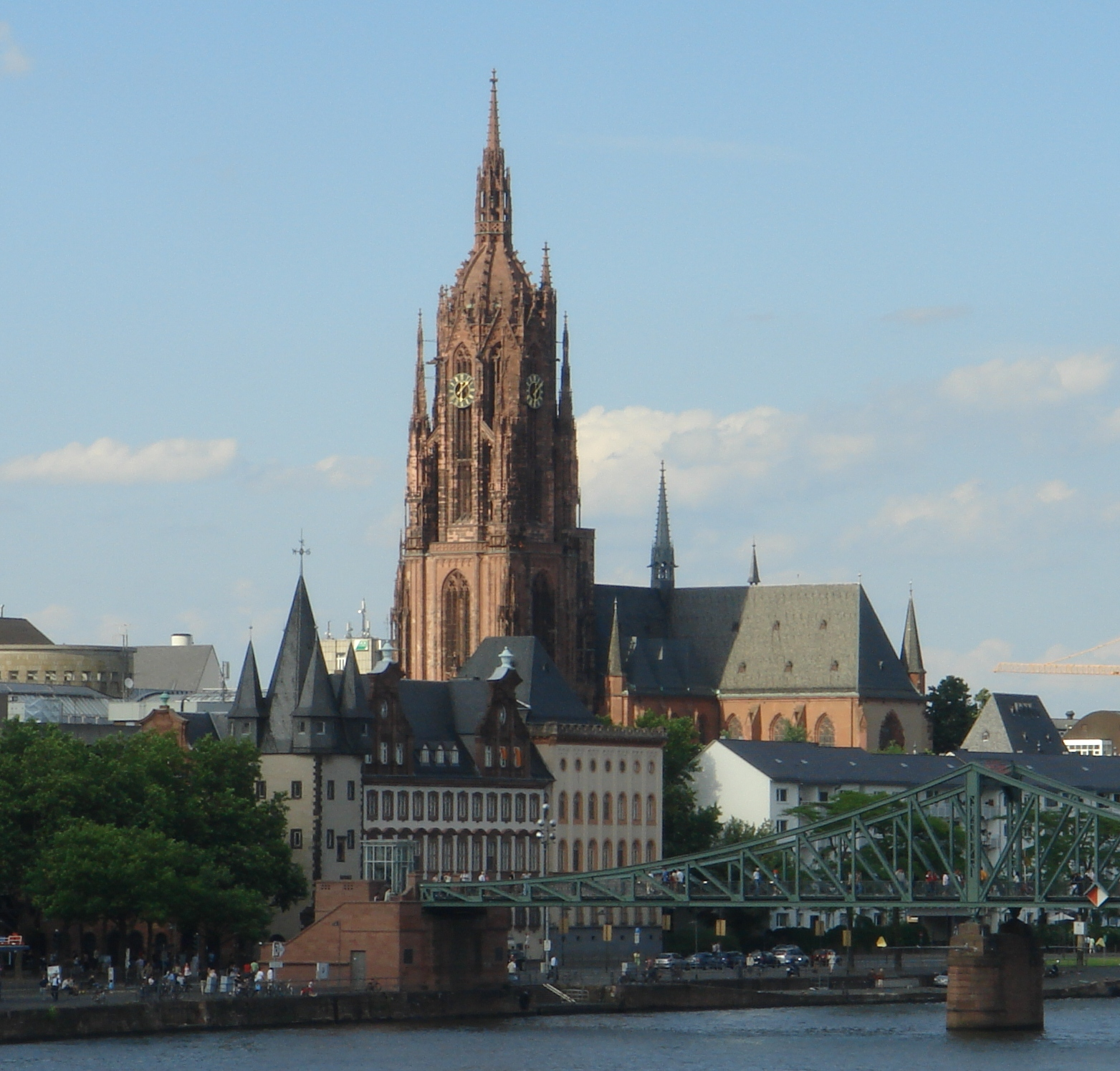
Frankfurt Cathedral, Germany

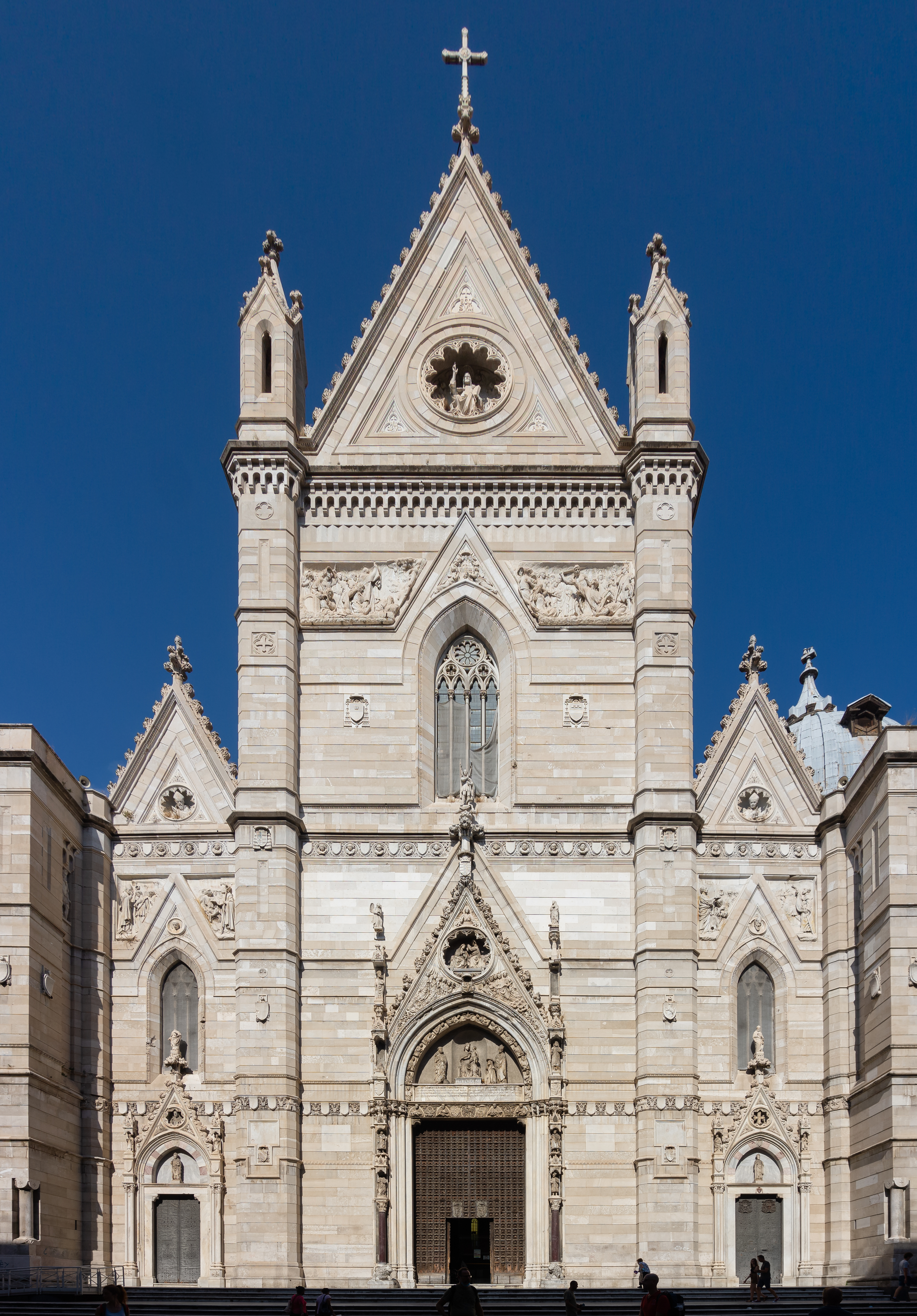
Naples Cathedral, Italy

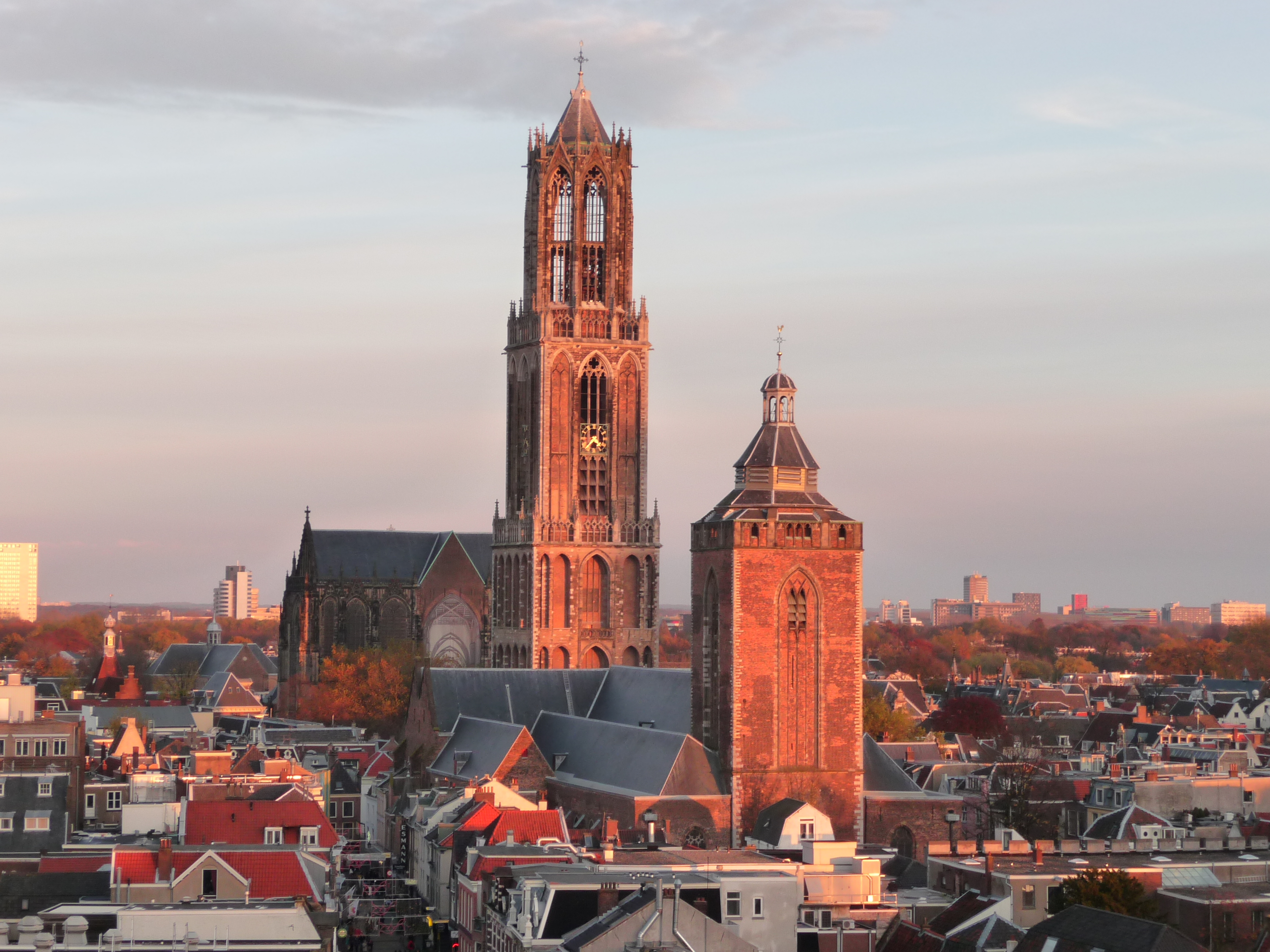
St. Martin's Cathedral, Utrecht, Netherlands

== See also ==
- List of building types
