= San Michele degli Scalzi =

Church in Pisa, Italy

Coordinates: 43.7060°N 10.4192°E

Church of San Michele degli Scalzi
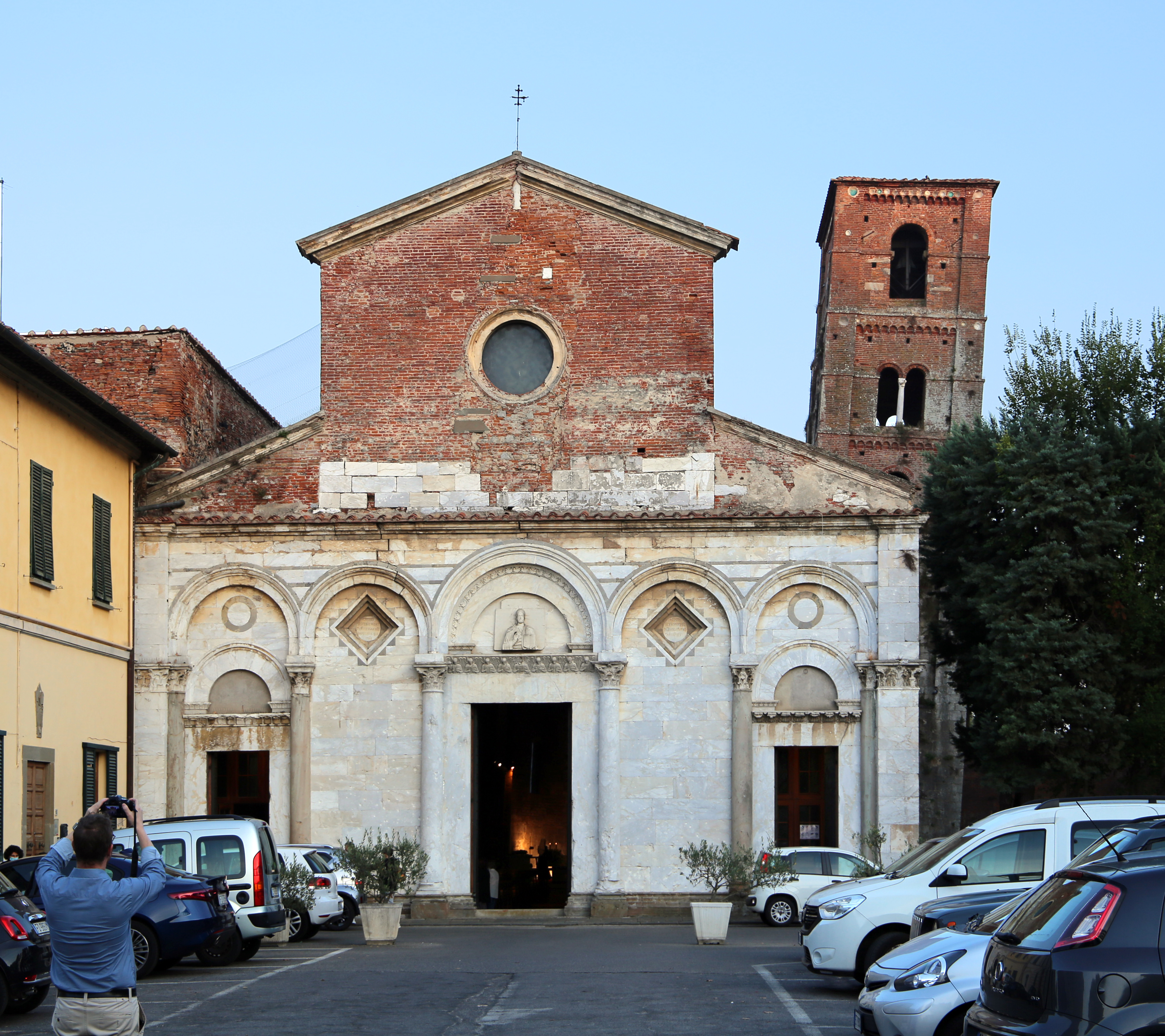

Religion
- Affiliation: Roman Catholic
- Province: Pisa

Location
- Location: Pisa, Italy
- Interactive map of Church of San Michele degli Scalzi

Architecture
- Type: Church
- Style: Romanesque

San Michele degli Scalzi is a church located in Piazza San Michele degli Scalzi, in the eastern part of Pisa, Italy. It had also been known as the church of San Michele degli Scalzi in Orticaia, referring to the swampy nature of the site at the time of its founding. The term Scalzi refers to the barefoot monks linked to the church. Dating back to the 11th century, it has been restored several times in the original Romanesque style.

== History ==
An oratory chapel was known at the site by 1025. A church was later built at the site and was assigned to an adjacent convent of Benedictines that was established in 1178 by monks from the abbey of Santa Maria di Pulsano sul Gargano. The first restoration of the site was completed by 1204. In the 15th century the church belonged successively to several religious orders, and before 1463 it came under the Canons Regular of the Lateran. Major modifications included the elaborate coffered ceiling (1596).

The church was transferred to the Olivetan Order in 1774. Further internal decorations were added. Nineteenth-century reconstructions aimed to restore the original Romanesque features. Bombardments during the second world war, and floods, damaged the structure, requiring major rebuilding.

== Today ==
The basilica structure of three naves is still preserved, ending with a semicircular apse. The incomplete façade has marble only in the lower layers. There are three portals. The central lunette has a copy of their original Byzantine decoration from 1203–1204 depicting a Christ providing Benediction (the original is in the National Museum of San Matteo, Pisa). The frieze is decorated with a relief of the angelic hierarchy in Byzantine style. The interior hosts a 13th-century crucifix, painted in tempera and gilded; this artwork was originally in the church of Santi Cosma e Damiano, also in Pisa. The left site of the nave has a fresco of St Onofrius, Helen and a bishop. The altar dates from the 18th century. The organ was constructed by Anselmi-Tamburini and was brought here from the anterior parish church of San Michele in 1985. The former monastery, completely renovated, now serves as the cultural centre for the parish.

== Bibliography ==
- Bologna Alessio,Sant'Ubaldo vescovo ed esorcista, Carmignani editrice, 2019
