= Cassella (disambiguation) =

Cassella is a German chemicals company founded by Leopold Cassela.

Cassella may also refer to:

- Cassella, Ohio, an unincorporated community in Marion Township, Mercer County, United States
- Cassella (surname)
- Caryocolum cassella, a species of moth

== See also ==
- Casella (disambiguation), similar spelling
