= Tamburini =

Tamburini is an Italian surname. Notable people with the surname include:

- Adrian Tamburini, Australian bass-baritone singer with Zelman Symphony
- Antonio Tamburini (baritone) (1800–1876), Italian operatic baritone
- Antonio Tamburini (racing driver) (born 1966), Italian racing driver
- Arnaldo Tamburini (1843–1901), Italian painter
- Arnaldo Casella Tamburini (1885–1936), Italian artist
- Elias Tamburini (born 1995), Finnish footballer
- Francesco Tamburini (1846–1891), Italian-Argentine architect
- Giovanni Maria Tamburini (flourished 1600s), Italian painter
- Josep Maria Tamburini (1856–1932), Catalan art critic and painter
- Juri Tamburini (born 1977), Italian footballer
- Luciana Tamburini (1952–2006), Italian actress and television hostess
- Massimo Tamburini (1943–2014), Italian motorcycle designer
- Michelangelo Tamburini (1648–1730), Italian Jesuit
- Pietro Paolo Tamburini (1594–1621), Italian painter
- Pietro Tamburini (1737–1827), Italian theologian and jurist
- Roberto Tamburini (born 1991), Italian Grand Prix motorcycle road racer
- Stefano Tamburini (1955–1986), Italian graphic artist, author and publisher
- Tommaso Tamburini (1591–1675), Italian theologian
- Tullio Tamburini (1892–1957), Italian soldier, adventurer and Fascist official

== See also ==
- Jenny Tamburi (1952–2006), Italian actress and television hostess
