= Asolo Altarpiece =

1506 painting by Lorenzo Lotto

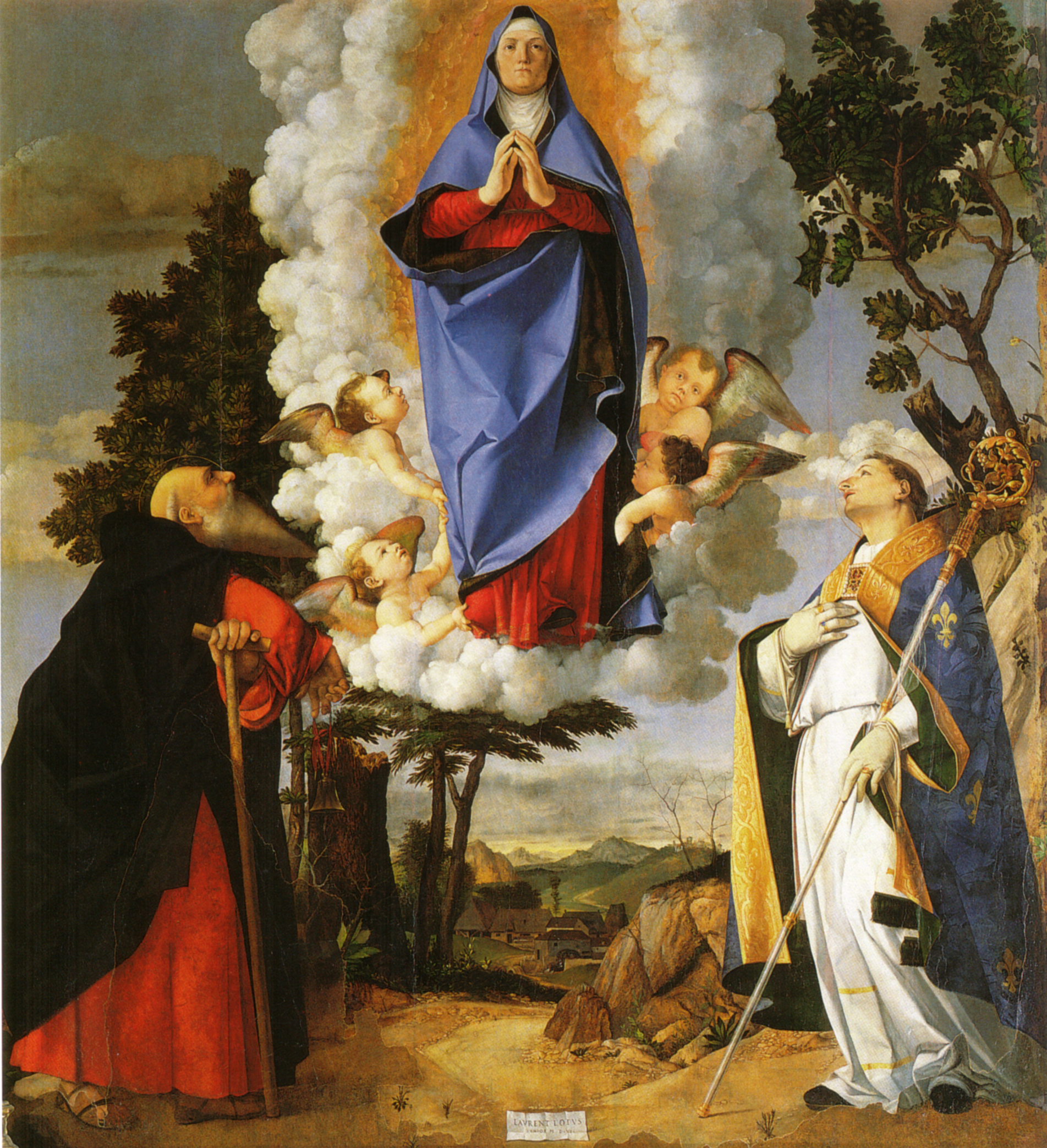
- Artist: Lorenzo Lotto
- Year: 1506
- Medium: oil on panel
- Dimensions: 175 cm × 162 cm (69 in × 64 in)
- Location: Asolo Duomo, Asolo

The Asolo Altarpiece is a 1506 oil-on-panel altarpiece, measuring 175 x 162 cm, by the Italian Renaissance painter Lorenzo Lotto. For a long time it was displayed in the Santa Caterina Oratory in Asolo but it is thought to have originally been painted for the Battuti confraternity's side-chapel in Asolo Duomo, where it now hangs. It is signed "Laurent[ius] Lotus / Junio[r] M.D.VI" on a cartouche in the lower centre. It dates to the end of his time in Treviso.

It shows a vision of the Assumption of Mary, shown as an old woman being taken up to heaven in a mandorla of light accompanied by four small angels. Her face may be based on that of Caterina Cornaro, who at that time headed a lively court full of artists and writers in Asolo. If this is correct, she may have commissioned it or it may have been commissioned by someone wishing to praise her.

Witnessing the vision are Antony the Great to the left and Louis of Toulouse to the right – the Battuti ran a hospital for the poor and sick so Antony (often prayed to for cures) and Louis (who renounced all worldly honours, including the throne of France) are apt choices. Lotto shows the influence of Perugino and others by creating a sense of movement through cutting off the top point of the mandorla. The landscape in the background may be based on Feltre, specifically the bell tower and church of its Santuario dei Santi Martiri Vittore e Corona on a rise to the left, its system of bridges in the centre and its castle (as it would have appeared just before its destruction in the War of the League of Cambrai in 1510) to the right.
