= Asolo Duomo =

Church in Asolo, Veneto, Italy

Coordinates: 45.801902°N 11.913674°E

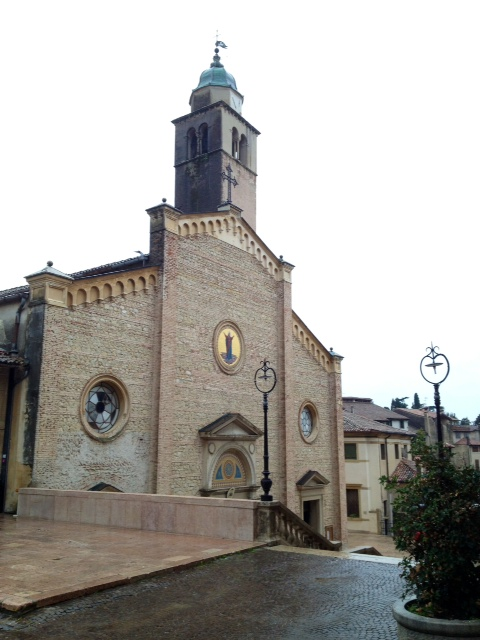
Facade

Asolo Duomo (duomo di Asolo) is the main church in the Italian city of Asolo. Its full title is the Provostorial and Collegiate Church of St Mary of the Assumption (chiesa prepositurale e collegiata di Santa Maria Assunta). It is a provostorial parish church and the seat of a vicariate of the diocese of Treviso. It was granted collegiate status in 1959, when it was granted an establishment of titular and honorary canons headed by a provost, who was also the parish priest.

The Roman Catholic Diocese of Asolo was merged with Treviso in the 10th century.

The current structure is mostly from the 15th, 18th and 19th centuries; it was officially built by 1747.

It once again contains the Asolo Altarpiece by Lorenzo Lotto (1506), probably painted for it, but for a long time hung in a different church. It also has a baptismal font built by Queen Caterina.
