= Caselle =

Caselle may refer to the following places in Italy:

== Municipalities (comuni) ==
- Caselle in Pittari, in the Province of Salerno, Campania
- Caselle Landi, in the province of Lodi, Lombardy
- Caselle Lurani, in the province of Lodi, Lombardy
- Caselle Torinese, in the province of Turin, Piedmont

== Hamlets (frazioni) ==
- Caselle (Alseno), in the municipality of Alseno (PC), Emilia-Romagna
- Caselle (Altivole), in the municipality of Altivole (TV), Veneto
- Caselle (Crevalcore), in the municipality of Crevalcore (BO), Emilia-Romagna
- Caselle (Maltignano), in the municipality of Maltignano (AP), Marche
- Caselle (Morimondo), in the municipality of Morimondo (MI), Lombardy
- Caselle (San Zeno al Naviglio), in the municipality of San Zeno Naviglio (BS), Lombardy
- Caselle (Selvazzano Dentro), in the municipality of Selvazzano Dentro (PD), Veneto
- Caselle (Sommacampagna), in the municipality of Sommacampagna (VR), Veneto
- Caselle (Tortorella), in the municipality of Tortorella (SA), Campania
- Caselle de' Ruffi, in the municipality of Santa Maria di Sala (VE), Veneto

== See also ==
- Casella (disambiguation)
