= Cassella (surname) =

Cassella is a surname of Italian origin. Notable people with this surname include:

- Carol Cassella, American novelist
- Giuseppe Cassella (1755–1808), Italian astronomer
- Leopold Cassella (1766–1847), German businessman
- Maggie Cassella, American-Canadian actress

== See also ==
- Casella (disambiguation)
