= Casella, Asolo =

Coordinates: 45°47′11″N 11°55′22″E

Casella is the most populous frazione (hamlet) of the municipality of Asolo, Italy with a population of 4,500. The hamlet covers an area of 6 km^{2}, sitting 97–108 m above sea level. Casella lies 1.5 km from downtown Asolo.

== See also ==
- Asolo
- Pagnano (Asolo)
- Villa Barbini-Rinaldi
