= Karen Casella =

- Occupation: Engineering executive

Karen Casella is an engineering executive and advocate for inclusion in the technology industry. She is an engineering leader at Netflix and previously held leadership positions at eBay and shop.com. She was also named a Lesbians Who Tech LGBTQ Tech and Innovation fellow.

== Early life and education ==
Karen Casella grew up on the South Shore in Massachusetts. She attended Worcester Polytechnic Institute, graduating in 1983 with a B.S. in mechanical engineering.

== Career ==
Casella began her career at Maxtor, a company that manufactured hard disk drives. In 1993, she became a software engineer and architect at Sun Microsystems. After 11 years at Sun, she served as Director of Application Architecture at eBay, Inc. and then became Vice President of Site Development at SHOP.COM in 2005. In 2008, she was promoted to Vice President of Engineering, and in 2010, she became Senior Vice President of Engineering, leading the SHOP.COM engineering team and managing software development, quality assurance, and worldwide site operations. She is currently the engineering leader of Netflix's Edge & Playback Access teams, which ensure that users are viewing content securely. In this position, she oversaw the implementation of the download feature, which allows users to download content onto their devices to watch without access to the Internet.

== Advocacy work ==
Casella also advocates for inclusion of women, the LGBTQ community, and other underrepresented groups in technology. In 2017, she hosted a panel on diversity and inclusion in technology at the QCon software architecture conference. She was also selected as an LGBTQ Tech and Innovation fellow by Lesbians Who Tech. In this fellowship, she served as an engineering lead for an app, funded by the Tegan and Sara Foundation, which helps young queer women find mentors in their career area of interest.
