= Alessandra Casella =

Economist, researcher, and professor

- Occupations: Economist; researcher; professor; author

Academic background
- Education: Bocconi University; Massachusetts Institute of Technology

Alessandra Casella is an economist, researcher, professor, and author. Currently, she is an Economics and Political Science professor at Columbia University.

== Life ==
Casella received her bachelor's degree with a summa cum laude in Economics and Social Sciences from Bocconi University, Milan, in March 1983. She furthered her studies at Massachusetts Institute of Technology (MIT), where she received her master's degree and Ph.D. in economics, 1988. Her thesis focused on hyperinflation and the real exchange rates and supply shocks in the economy. After graduating, Casella's research continues to focus on economics, with more specific interests in public economics, experimental economics, and political economy.

In 2019, Casella was the director of the Columbia Laboratory for the Social Sciences, and a fellow in both the National Bureau of Economic Research in Cambridge and the British Center for Economic Policy Research. She is the author of two books: Networks and Markets. Contributions from Economics and Sociology and Storable Votes: Protecting the Minority Voice.

== Career ==
=== Academic ===
Casella started her teaching career at UC Berkeley as an assistant professor from 1987 to 1993. From 1996 to 2010, she was the part-time Director of Studies at the École des Hautes Études en Sciences Sociales (EHESS, School for Advanced Studies in the Social Sciences) based in Paris, France. In the time between her career in UC Berkeley and Directorship at EHESS, Casella became an associate Professor of Economics at Columbia University, New York, from 1993 till 1997. Her career with Columbia University continued where she eventually became a professor of economics at Columbia University in 1997 until current. Since then, Casella has taught Ph.D. courses in Experimental Methods in Political Economy and Special Topics in Political Economics. She has also taught undergraduate classes in political economy and experimental economics. Since 2017, Casella has also become a professor of Political Science at Columbia University.

=== Journals ===
- 1996: Invited editor for the European Economic Review. A special issue on the domain of the state
- 2007: Invited editor for the Journal of Economic Behavior and Organization. A special issue in honor of Economist Alan Kirman
- 2004–2009: Associate Editor for the Journal of Public Economic Theory
- 2013–2017: On the editorial board for the Journal of Experimental Political Science
- 2016–current: Associate Editor for the American Economic Review

=== Others ===
- 1988–1997: Faculty Research Fellow at the National Bureau of Economic Research, Cambridge
- 1988: Research Fellow at the Center for Economic Policy Research, London
- 1994–1995: Panel member at Economic Policy
- 1997: Research associate at National Bureau of Economic Research, Cambridge
- 2004–2006: Economics panel member at the National Science Foundation
- 2012: Director at Columbia Experimental Laboratory for Social Sciences
- 2013–2016: Scientific Board member at AXA Research Fund

== Fellowships ==
- Fall 1989: National Bureau of Economic Research, Ford Foundation Fellowship
- 1990–1991: Hoover Institution, Stanford University, National Fellow
- 1992–1993: Institute for Policy Reform, Washington, D.C., Junior Research Fellow
- 1993: German Marshall Fund of the United States Fellowship
- 1997–1998: Russell Sage Foundation, New York, N.Y., Fellow
- 2004–2005: Institute for Advanced Study, Princeton, N.J., Member
- 2006–2007: John Simon Guggenheim Fellow
- 2012–2013: Straus Institute Fellow, NYU Law School

== Academic publications ==
Journal publications
Year	Title	Publication	Author(s)
1984	Elasticita' di Sostituzione tra Energia, Capitale e Lavoro nel Settore Manifatturiero Italiano 1960-1978	Giornale degli Economisti, XLIII, 491–505.	Alessandra Casella
1989	Integracion Monetaria Europea y la Economia de la Sostitucion de Monedas	Informacion Comercial Espanola, November, 47–50.	Alessandra Casella
1989	Testing for Rational Bubbles with Exogenous or Endogenous Fundamentals: the German Hyperinflation Once More	Journal of Monetary Economics, 24,109–122.	Alessandra Casella
1990	Economic Exchange during Hyperinflation	Journal of Political Economy, 98, 1–27.	Alessandra Casella & Jonathan Feinstein
1992	Federalism and Clubs. Towards an Economic Theory of Overlapping Political Jurisdictions	European Economic Review, 36, 639–646.	Alessandra Casella & Bruno Frey
1992	A Note on Bargaining and Inflation	Economic Letters, 38, 393–398.	Alessandra Casella & Jonathan Feinstein
1992	On Markets and Clubs. Economic and Political Integration of Regions with Unequal Productivity	American Economic Review, 82, 115–121.	Alessandra Casella
1992	Participation in a Currency Union	American Economic Review, 82, 847–863.	Alessandra Casella
1994	Trade as Engine of Political Change. A Parable	Economica, 61, 267–284.	Alessandra Casella
1996	On Market Integration and the Development of Institutions. The Case of International Commercial Arbitration	European Economic Review, 40, 155–186. (Reprinted in O. C. Ashenfelter and R. K. Iyengar (eds.), 2009, Economics of Commercial Arbitration and Dispute Resolution, Edward Elgar Publishing).	Alessandra Casella
1996	Large Countries, Small Countries and the Enlargement of Trade Blocs	European Economic Review, 40, 389–415.	Alessandra Casella
1996	Can Foreign Aid Accelerate Stabilization?	The Economic Journal, 106, 605–619.	Alessandra Casella & Barry Eichengreen
1999	Tradable Deficit Permits. Efficient Implementation of the Stability Pact in the European Monetary Union	Economic Policy, 29, 323–361. (Reprinted in Brunila, A., Buti, M. and D. Franco (eds.), 2001, The Stability and Growth Pact, Palgrave: London, 394–413.).	Alessandra Casella
2001	Product Standards and International Trade. Harmonization through Private Coalitions?	Kyklos, 54, 243–264. (Reprinted in Henson, S. and J.S. Wilson (eds.), 2005, The WTO and Technical Barriers to Trade, Edward Elgar Publishing: Cheltenham, U.K., 494–515.)	Alessandra Casella
2001	The Role of Market Size in the Formation of Jurisdictions	The Review of Economic Studies, 68, 83–108.	Alessandra Casella
2001	Market Mechanisms for Policy Decisions. Tools for the European Union	European Economic Review, 45, 995–1006.	Alessandra Casella
2002	Public Goods in Trade: On the Formation of Markets and Jurisdictions	International Economic Review, 43, 437–462.	Alessandra Casella & Jonathan Feinstein
2002	Anonymous Market and Group Ties in International Trade	Journal of International Economics, 58, 19–47. (Reprinted in Falvey, R. E. and U. Kreickemeier, (eds.), 2005, Recent Developments in International Trade Theory, Edward Elgar Publishing: Cheltenham, U.K.)	Alessandra Casella & James Rauch
2003	Overcoming Informational Barriers in International Resource Allocations: Prices and Ties	The Economic Journal, 113, 21–42.	Alessandra Casella & James Rauch
2005	Storable Votes	Games and Economic Behavior, 51, 391–419.	Alessandra Casella
2005	Redistribution Policy: A European Model	Journal of Public Economics, 89, 1305–1331.	Alessandra Casella
2006	Why Personal Ties Cannot Be Bought	American Economic Review, 96, 2, 261–264.	Alessandra Casella & Nobuyuki Hanaki
2006	An Experimental Study of Storable Votes	Games and Economic Behavior, 57, 123–154.	Alessandra Casella, Andrew Gelman, & Thomas Palfrey
2007	Storable Votes: Protecting Minorities without Sacrificing Efficiency	CESifo DICE Report, 5, 3, 17–22.	Alessandra Casella, Thomas Palfrey, & Raymond Riezman
2008	Information Channels in Labor Markets. On the Resilience of Referral Hiring	Journal of Economic Behavior and Organization, 66, 492–513.	Alessandra Casella & Nobuyuki Hanaki
2008	A Simple Scheme to Improve the Efficiency of Referenda	Journal of Public Economics, 92: 2240–2261.	Alessandra Casella & Andrew Gelman
2008	Minorities and Storable Votes	Quarterly Journal of Political Science, 3: 165–200.	Alessandra Casella, Thomas Palfrey, & Raymond Riezman
2010	Protecting Minorities in Large Binary Elections. A Test of Storable Votes Using Field Data	The B.E. Journal of Economic Analysis & Policy (Advances), Vol. 10: Iss. 1.	Alessandra Casella, Shuky Ehrenberg, Andrew Gelman, & Jie Shen
2011	Agenda Control as a Cheap Talk Game. Theory and Experiments with Storable Votes	Games and Economic Behavior, 72: 46–76.	Alessandra Casella
2012	Competitive Equilibrium in Markets for Votes	Journal of Political Economy, 120: 593–658.	Alessandra Casella, Aniol Llorente-Saguer & Thomas Palfrey
2014	Vote Trading with and without Party Leaders	Journal of Public Economics, 112:115–128.	Alessandra Casella, Thomas Palfrey, & Sebastien Turban
2014	Democracy Undone. Systematic Minority Advantage in Competitive Vote Markets	Games and Economic Behavior, 88: 47–70.	Alessandra Casella & Sebastien Turban
2017	Storable Votes and Judicial Nominations in the U.S. Senate	Journal of Theoretical Politics, 29: 243–272.	Alessandra Casella, Sébastien Turban, & Gregory Wawro
2017	Democracy for Polarized Committees. The Tale of Blotto’s Lieutenants	Games and Economic Behavior, 106, 239–259.	Alessandra Casella, Jean-Francois Laslier, & Antonin Macé
2018	Communication in Context: Interpreting Promises in an Experiment on Competition and Trust	PNAS, 115 (5) 933–938.	Alessandra Casella, Navin Kartik, Luis Sanchez, & Sébastien Turban
2018	A Property Rights Approach to Temporary Work Visas	Journal of Legal Studies, 47 (S1), S195–S227.	Alessandra Casella & Adam Cox

=== Working papers ===
- “Trading Votes for Votes. An Experiment” (with Thomas Palfrey), May 2017
- “Storable Votes and Quadratic Voting. An Experiment on Four California Propositions” (with Luis Sanchez), in progress.

== Books ==
- Storable Votes: Protecting the Minority Voice. Oxford University Press, New York, 2012. Print ISBN 9780195309096
- Networks and Markets. Contributions from Economics and Sociology (With James Raunch), Russell Sage Foundation, New York, 2001. ISBN 978-0-87154-700-2

Chapters in Books
Year	Book	Chapter	Publication
1989	A European Central Bank?	"Management of a Common Currency" p. 131-156	Cambridge University Press: Cambridge
1992	Establishing a Central Bank	"Voting on the Adoption of a Common Currency" p. 164-184	Cambridge University Press: Cambridge
1994	Monetary Regimes in Transition	"Halting Inflation in Italy and France after World War II" p. 312-345	Cambridge University Press: Cambridge
1995	Politics and Institutions in an Integrated Europe	"Elements for a Theory of Jurisdictional Change" p. 11-41	Springer: New York and Heidelberg
1996	Harmonization and Fair Trade	"Free Trade and Evolving Standards" p. 119-156	MIT Press: Cambridge
2001	Ökonomie als Grundlage politischer Entscheidungen	"Policy Coordination and National Sovereignty in a Monetary Union. Two Easy Recipes" p. 199–217	Leske plus Budrich: Opladen
2001	Networks and Markets	“Concluding Remarks. Questions for Policy” p. 328-337	
2001	The Impact of EMU on Europe and the Developing Countries	"Games for Central Bankers. Markets vs Politics in Public Policy Decisions" p. 11-27	Oxford University Press: Oxford
