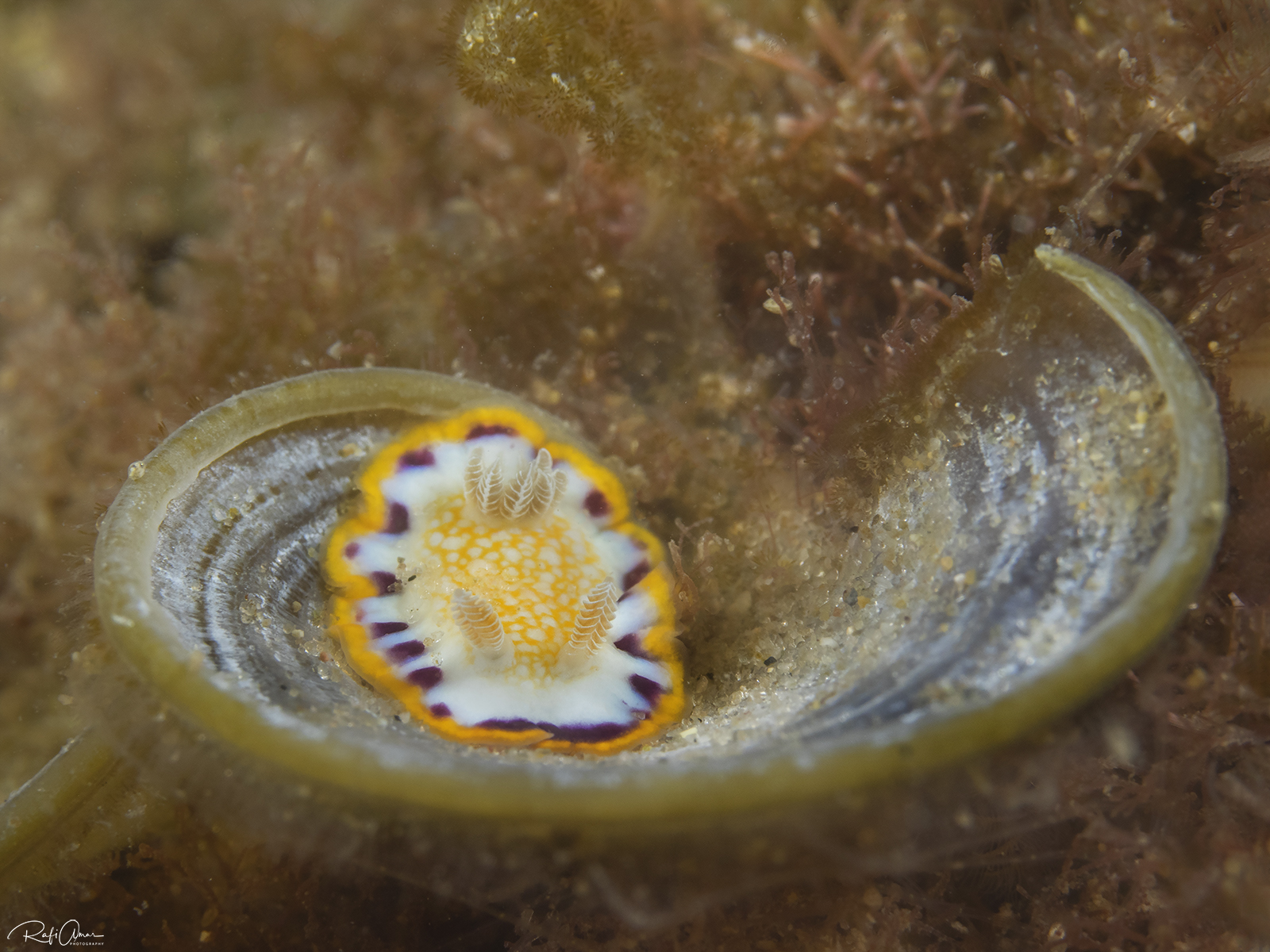

Scientific classification
- Kingdom: Animalia
- Phylum: Mollusca
- Class: Gastropoda
- Order: Nudibranchia
- Family: Chromodorididae
- Genus: Goniobranchus
- Species: G. obsoletus

Binomial name
- Goniobranchus obsoletus (Rüppell & Leuckart, 1831)

Synonyms
- Casella obsoleta (Rüppell & Leuckart, 1831); Chromodoris obsoleta (Rüppell & Leuckart, 1831); Doris obsoleta Rüppell & Leuckart, 1831 (basionym)

= Goniobranchus obsoletus =

Species of gastropod

Goniobranchus obsoletus is a species of colourful sea slug, a dorid nudibranch, a marine gastropod mollusc in the family Chromodorididae.

== Distribution ==
This species was described from the Red Sea. It has also been reported from the Persian Gulf.

== Description ==
Goniobranchus obsoletus is a chromodorid nudibranch with a mostly white mantle and an orange mantle edge. There is an irregular band of blue-black just inside the orange margin and the mantle is rugose with an orange-brown reticulation between the raised pustules. The rhinophores and gills are translucent brown with white markings.
