= Giovanni Andrea Casella =

Italian painter

Giovanni Andrea Casella (17th century) was a Swiss-Italian painter active in the Baroque period. He was born in Lugano. He was a pupil of Pietro da Cortona in Rome. He was patronized by House of Savoy in frescoes for palaces in Turin, and known to be active in 1658. He painted in the Veneria Reale some fables, assisted by Giacomo, his nephew.
