= Franco Casella =

Venezuelan politician (1972–2025)

Franco Casella (Latin American Spanish: [ˈfɾaŋko kaˈseʝa]; 1 November 1972 – 6 August 2025) was a Venezuelan politician.

== Life and career ==
In the 2015 Venezuelan parliamentary elections, he was elected as a deputy for the Vente Venezuela party to the National Assembly, where he was a member of the Subcommittee on Human Rights.

On 14 May 2019, he took refuge in the Mexican embassy in Caracas after being accused by the 2017 National Constituent Assembly of being linked to the uprising against Nicolás Maduro on 30 April. Casella was in the embassy for four months until 20 September, when he went into exile in Spain. On 2 March 2021, he was politically disqualified for 15 years by Comptroller General Elvis Amoroso.

Casella died in Spain on 6 August 2025, after suffering two heart attacks.
