= Arnaldo Tamburini =

Italian painter

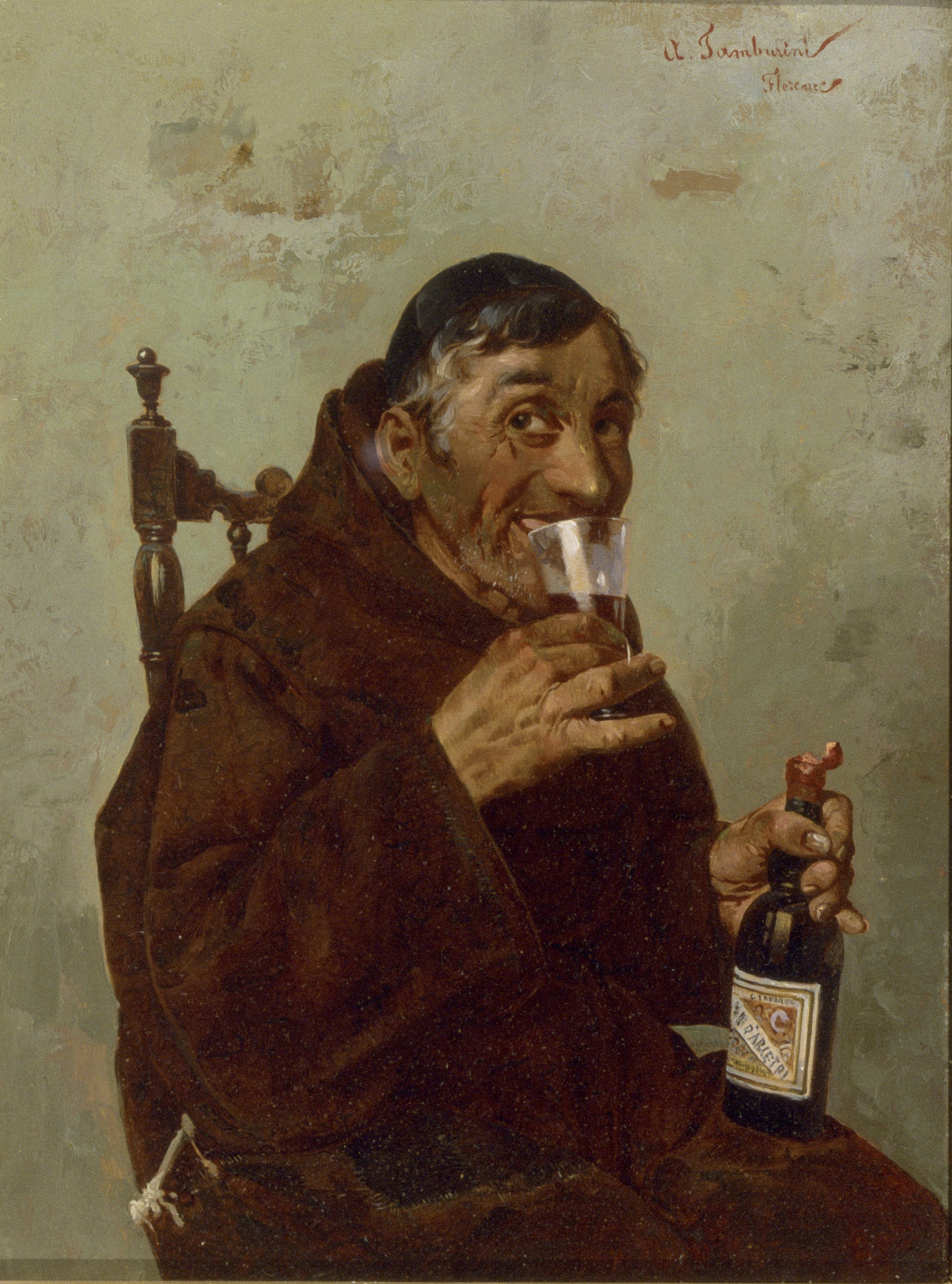
The Monk by Arnaldo Tamburini, late 1800s

Arnaldo Tamburini (1843 – 1901) was an Italian painter, with a predilection for painting humorous scenes of tippling monks or anachronistic priests involved in dubious activity. he was active in Florence. A portrait of Umberto I is found in the National Museum of San Matteo, Pisa. He is the father of Arnaldo Casella Tamburini Junior, also a painter.

== Works ==
- The Monk Hood Museum of Art, Dartmouth College, New Hampshire
- In the Studio Smithsonian American Art Museum, Washington, D.C.
