= Asolo =

Asolo Àxol (Venetian)
- Comune
- Città di Asolo
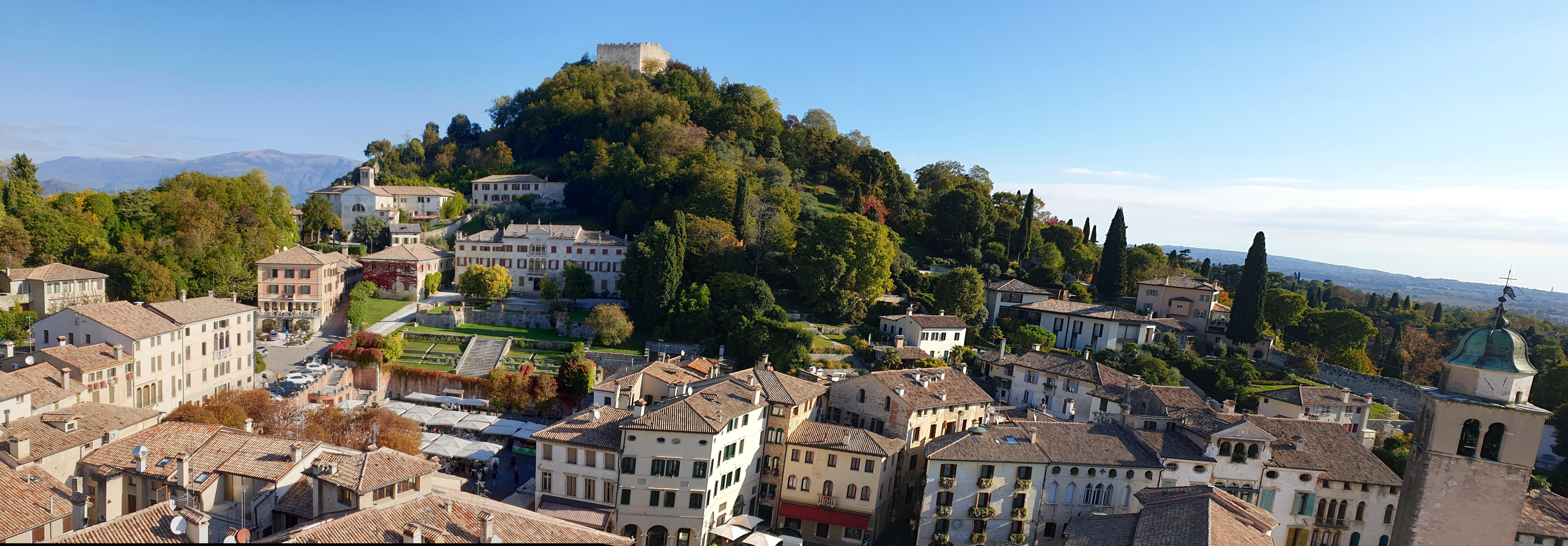

- Location of Asolo in Italy Asolo (Veneto)
- Coordinates: 45°48′N 11°55′E
- Country: Italy
- Region: Veneto
- Province: Treviso (TV)
- Frazioni: Casella, Pagnano, Villa d'Asolo

Government
  - Mayor: Mauro Migliorini

Area
  - Total: 25.37 km^{2} (9.80 sq mi)
- Elevation: 210 m (690 ft)

Population (31 December 2022)
  - Total: 8,948
  - Density: 352.7/km^{2} (913.5/sq mi)
- Demonym: Asolani
- Time zone: UTC+1 (CET)
  - Summer (DST): UTC+2 (CEST)
- Postal code: 31010
- Dialing code: 0423
- Patron saint: St. Prosdocimus
- Saint day: November 7
- Website: Official website

Asolo (Italian: [ˈaːzolo]; Venetian: Àxol) is a town and comune (municipality) in the Veneto region of northern Italy. It is known as "The Pearl of the province of Treviso", and also as "The City of a Hundred Horizons" for its mountain settings. It is one of I Borghi più belli d'Italia ("The most beautiful villages of Italy").

Its frazioni (boroughs or hamlets) include Casella, Pagnano and Villa d'Asolo.

== History ==
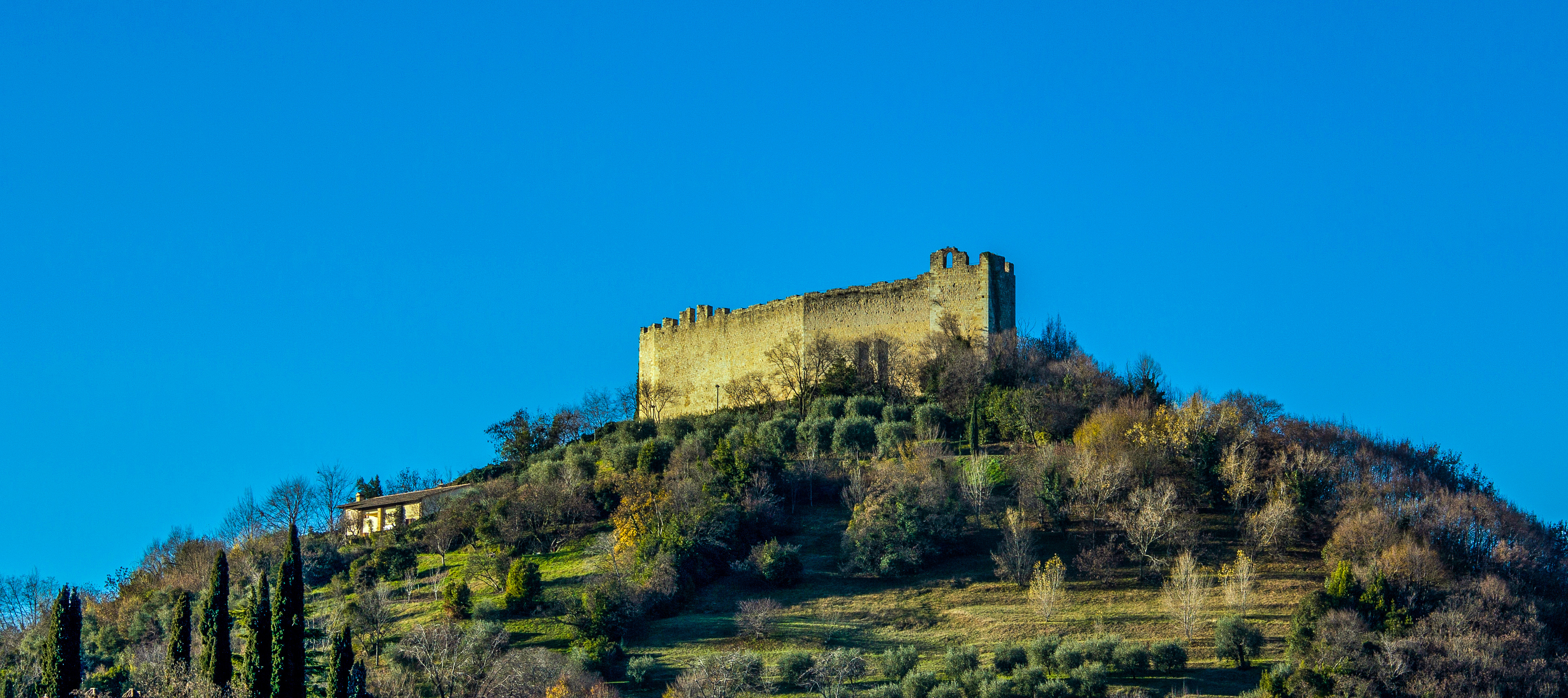
The Fortress of Asolo

The town was originally a settlement of the Veneti, and was mentioned as Acelum in the works of Pliny. Its citizens were inscribed into the Roman tribe Claudia. It was called Acelum in the acts of a synod held in Marano in 588 or 591, since one of the participants was Agnellus episcopus sanctae Acelinae ecclesiae; the name Asolo was already in use by the time of a synod held in Mantua in 827 (or perhaps 835), at which the participation of Arthemius episcopus Asolensis is noted. In 969, Emperor Otto I assigned the territory of the diocese of Acelum/Asolo to the diocese of Treviso. This action may be related to the destruction caused by the Hungarian raiders who in 899 defeated Berengar I of Italy near the town. However, one of the bishops at a synod at Rome under Pope Leo IX in 1049 was called Ugo of Asolo. No longer a residential bishopric, Acelum is today listed by the Catholic Church as a titular see.

In the early Middle Ages Asolo was a possession of the Ezzelini family. Later, it was the capital, and seat of the court, of the fiefdom of Asolo, which was granted by the Republic of Venice (to which it belonged) to Caterina Cornaro, the former Queen of Cyprus; in 1489 it was granted to her for life, but in 1509 when the League of Cambrai conquered and ransacked Asolo, Caterina fled to exile and died in Venice a year later. Under her reign, the painter Gentile Bellini, the poet Andrea Navagero, and the humanist Cardinal Pietro Bembo were part of the court.

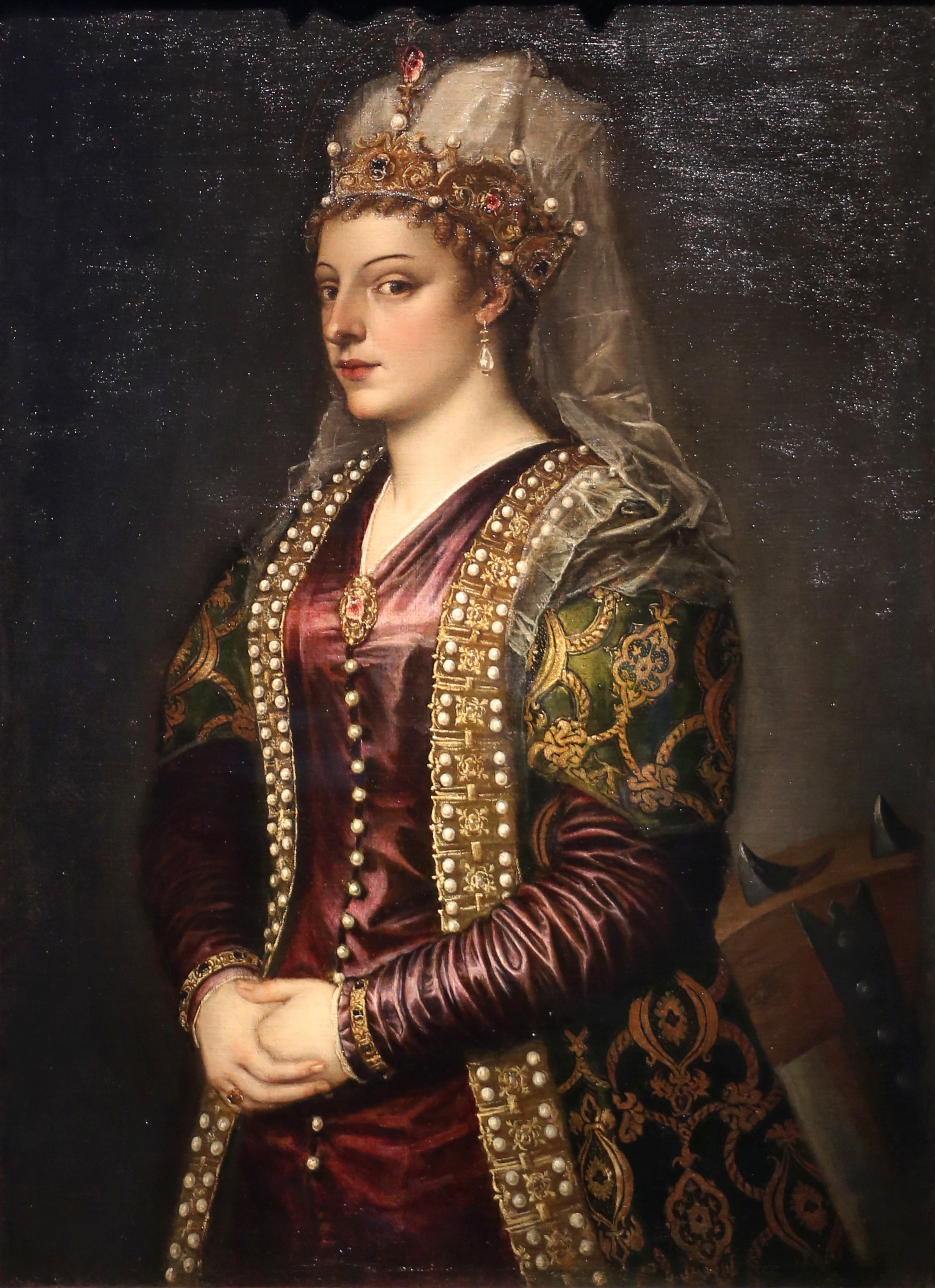
Portrait of Caterina Cornaro

In 1798, the Italian impresario Antonio Locatelli built the Asolo Theatre in the former audience hall of the castle of Caterina Cornaro.

The theatre was later purchased by Florida, for the John and Mable Ringling Museum of Art. The theatre was disassembled, shipped to Sarasota, Florida, and reassembled in one of the museum's galleries in 1952. It was then decided that the theatre should be reassembled into a usable theatre, on the museum's grounds in the late 1950s. The Historic Asolo Theater opened in 1958, and is now the home of the museum's Art of Performance program. Additionally, this theater was the birthplace for the Asolo Repertory Theatre and the Florida State University/Asolo Conservatory for Actor Training.

The town was also home to the English poet Robert Browning, the actress Eleonora Duse, the explorer Freya Stark, the violinist Wilma Neruda and the composer Gian Francesco Malipiero.

=== Jewish history ===
The earliest evidence of Jews in Asolo dates back to the middle of the sixteenth century. At that time, 37 Jews were living in Asolo. The community had owned a cemetery, from which two ancient tombstones are presented in the local gallery. On November 22, 1547, 10 Jews belonging to the community of Asolo, consisted at the time of 7 families and 2 guests, were killed by a mob led by a man called Antonio Parisotto. Five Jewish families’ houses were destroyed. A number of the attackers were put to justice and sentenced to death or exile. One of the survivors was Marco Cohen, who founded the Cantarini family, known for several of its members such as Hayyim Moses Cantarini, and others.

Other documentations of the Jewish community of Asolo mentions the prohibition of Jews bearing weapons and obligation to wear the yellow badge. There is evidence of Jewish presence after the 1546 attack, dating from the middle of the 17th century. The Jewish quarter was situated at the turn of Colmarion street, bounded on the north by the old road Colmarion, on the south by Piazza del Pavion and by the last stretch of via s. Caterina and crossed by the short Belvedere alley - this area was called "the Ghetto", housing about six houses.

== Main sights ==
- Remains of an amphitheatre (in the Villa Freya) and of an aqueduct.
- Rocca (castle, late 12th-early 13th centuries).
- The Castle of Caterina Cornaro, now home to the Eleonora Duse theatre.

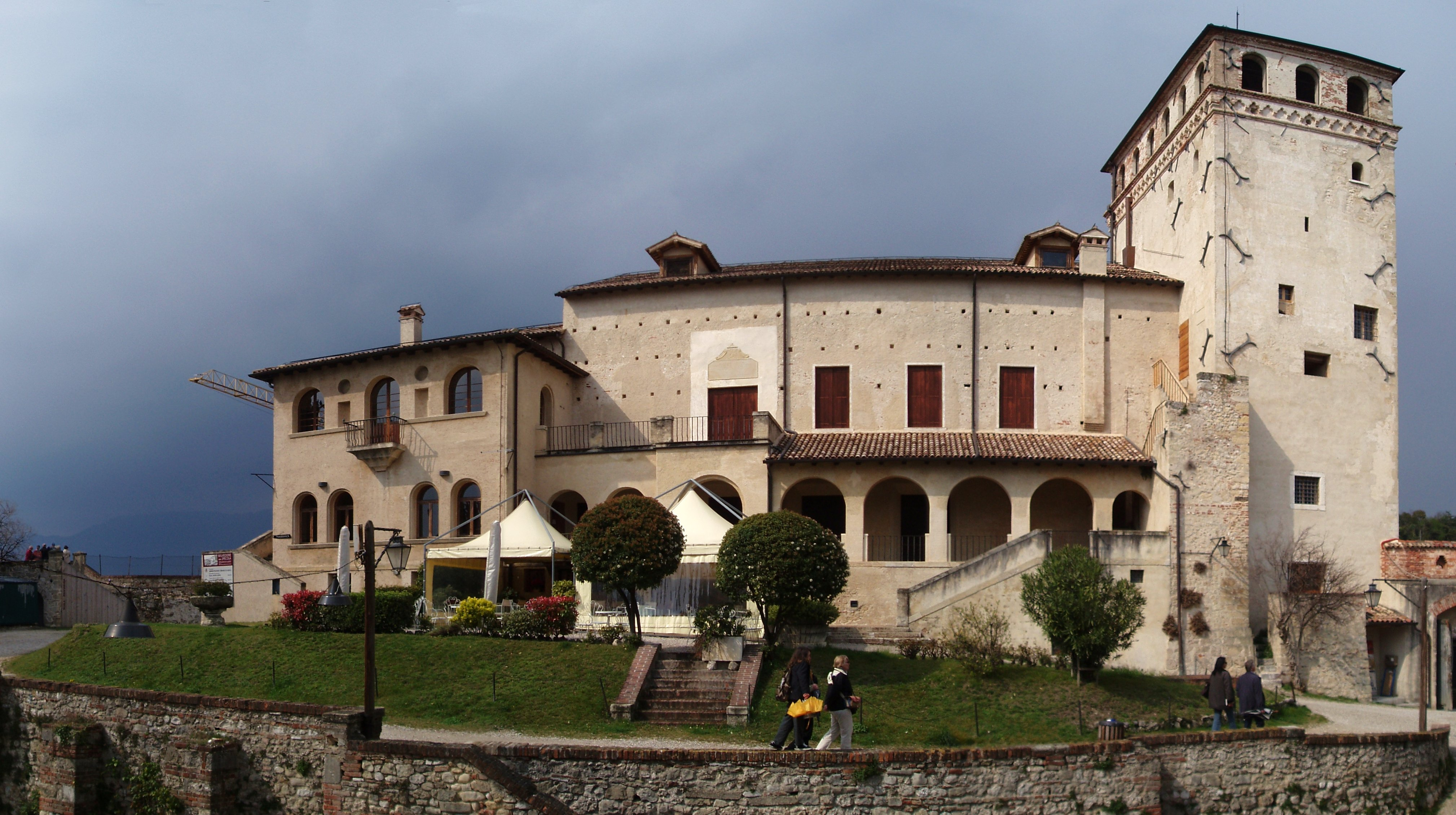
Inner court view of the Castle

- Palazzo della Ragione, housing the city's museum.
- The cathedral, built in 1747. In the interior is the Assunta altarpiece by Lorenzo Lotto.

For many years, the Convento di Santo Pietro (situated just below la Rocca) housed an American university: Consortium International for Management and Business Analysis (CIMBA). Students from all over the world lived, studied, and worked in the converted convent in Asolo while earning their MBA. The CIMBA program has since relocated to a larger campus in nearby Paderno del Grappa.

- Chiesa dell'Assunta (Assumption of Our Lady, who is portrayed in the mosaic of the main façade), the cathedral of the former residential see of Acelum or Asolo.
- Chiesa di San Gottardo (deconsecrated): it now hosts music concerts.
- Chiesa di Santa Caterina, with frescos from the 14th century
- Chiesa di Sant'Anna, next to the cemetery where Freya Stark and Eleonora Duse are buried.

== Demographic evolution ==
Historical population

Year	Pop.	±%
1861	?	—
1871	5,451	—
1881	5,813	+6.6%
1901	5,832	+0.3%
1911	6,564	+12.6%
1921	6,741	+2.7%

Year	Pop.	±%
1931	6,413	−4.9%
1936	6,710	+4.6%
1951	7,078	+5.5%
1961	6,253	−11.7%
1971	6,161	−1.5%
1981	6,285	+2.0%

Year	Pop.	±%
1991	6,651	+5.8%
2001	7,648	+15.0%
2011	8,931	+16.8%
2021	8,960	+0.3%

Source: Data from ISTAT

=== Foreign ethnicities and minorities ===
As of December 31, 2022, foreigners residents in the municipality were 1,169, i.e. 13.1% of the population. The largest groups are shown below:

1. Romania 584
2. Morocco 97
3. Kosovo 54
4. North Macedonia 53
5. Albania 49
6. China 49
7. Ukraine 30

== Economy ==
Asolo is best known for its lace production. and also for one of the largest companies in the Italian and international technical mountaineering and hiking footwear sector: Scarpa. Casella d'Asolo is home to the headquarters of Fashion Box S.p.a., founded in 1981 by Claudio Buziol. Replay is an Italian denim and smart casualwear brand belonging to the industrial group with exports that account for around 92% of the total turnover.

== Infrastructure and transport ==
Located along the state road 248 Schiavonesca-Marosticana, between 1914 and 1931 Asolo represented the western terminus of the Montebelluna-Asolo tramway, the first element of a never built rail route between Bassano del Grappa and Susegana, which at the time represented an important development tool for the economy of the area. Since 2014 it has been connected to Montebelluna and Treviso by several bus lines of MOM - Mobilità di Marca.

== Gallery ==
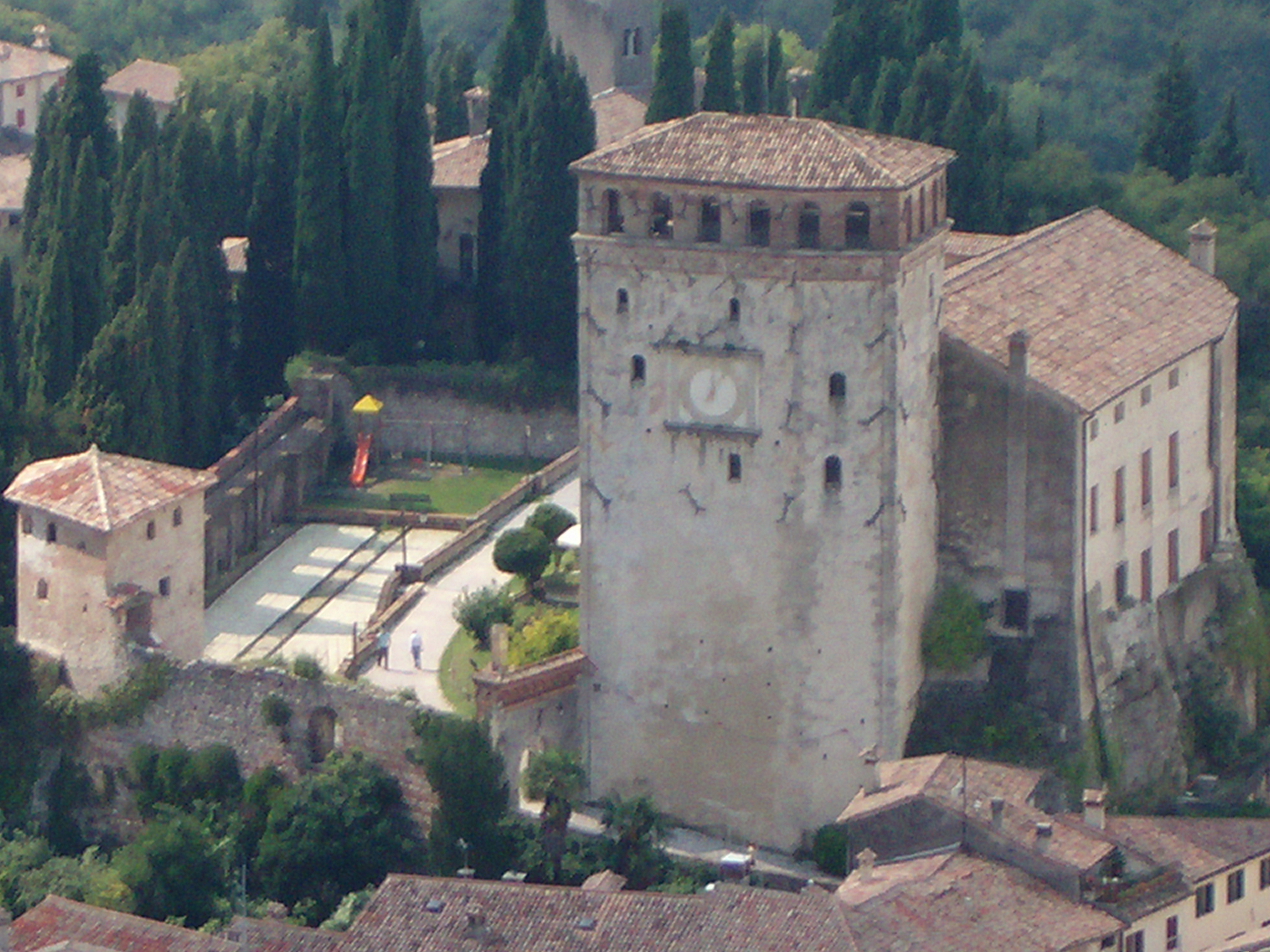
Aerial view of the castle

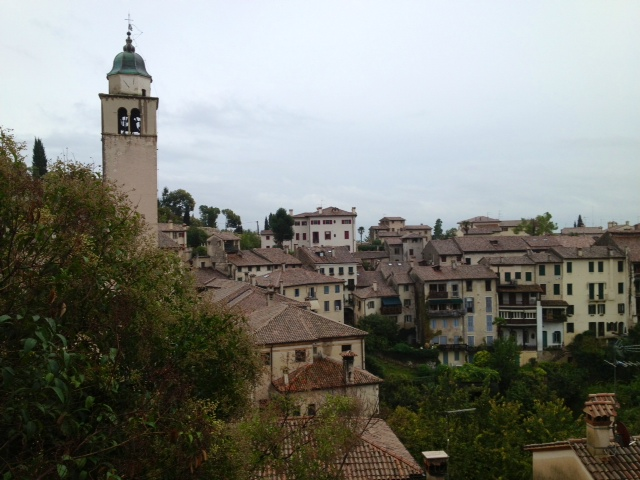
The imposing bell tower of the Duomo

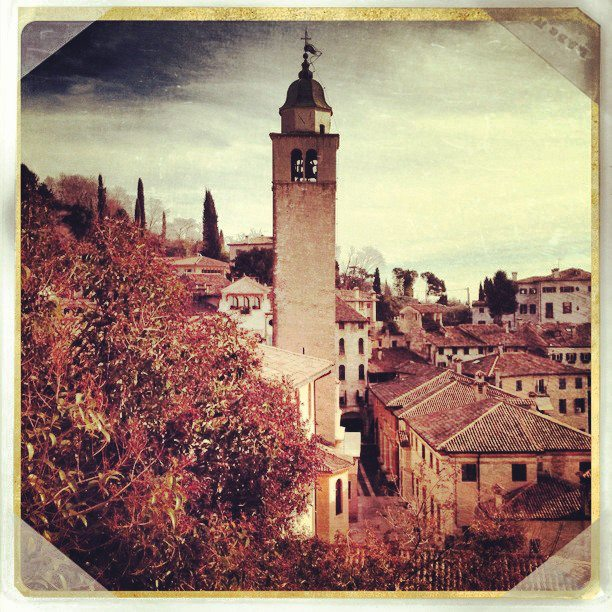
View of the historic center of Asolo from the castle

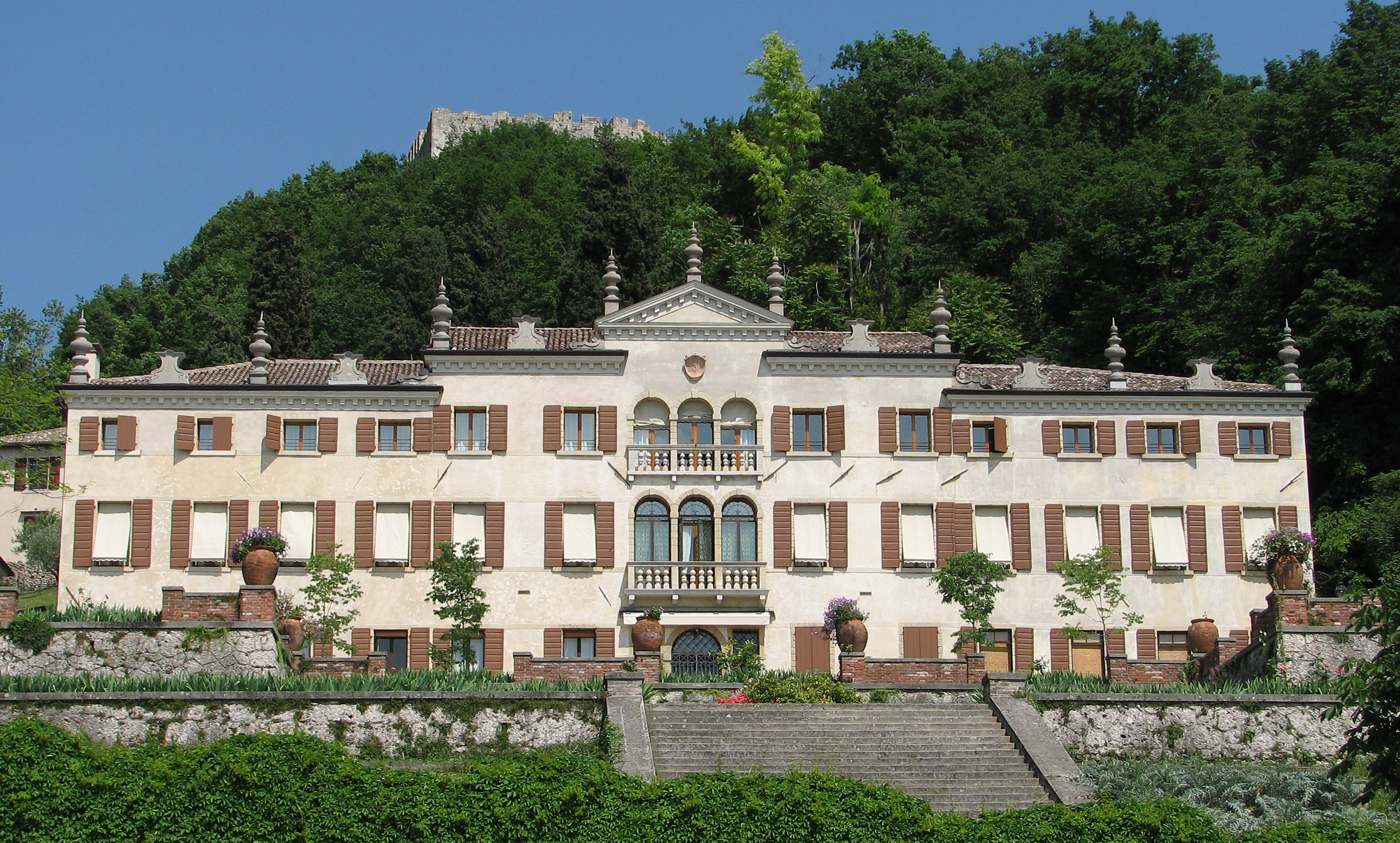
Villa Scotti Pasini, in the center of the city, whose façade overlooks Piazza Garibaldi

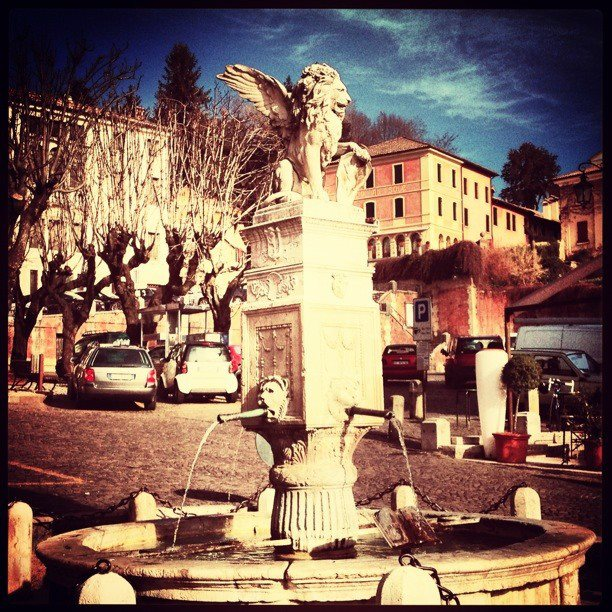
Fountain in Piazza Garibaldi, with the lion of St. Mark

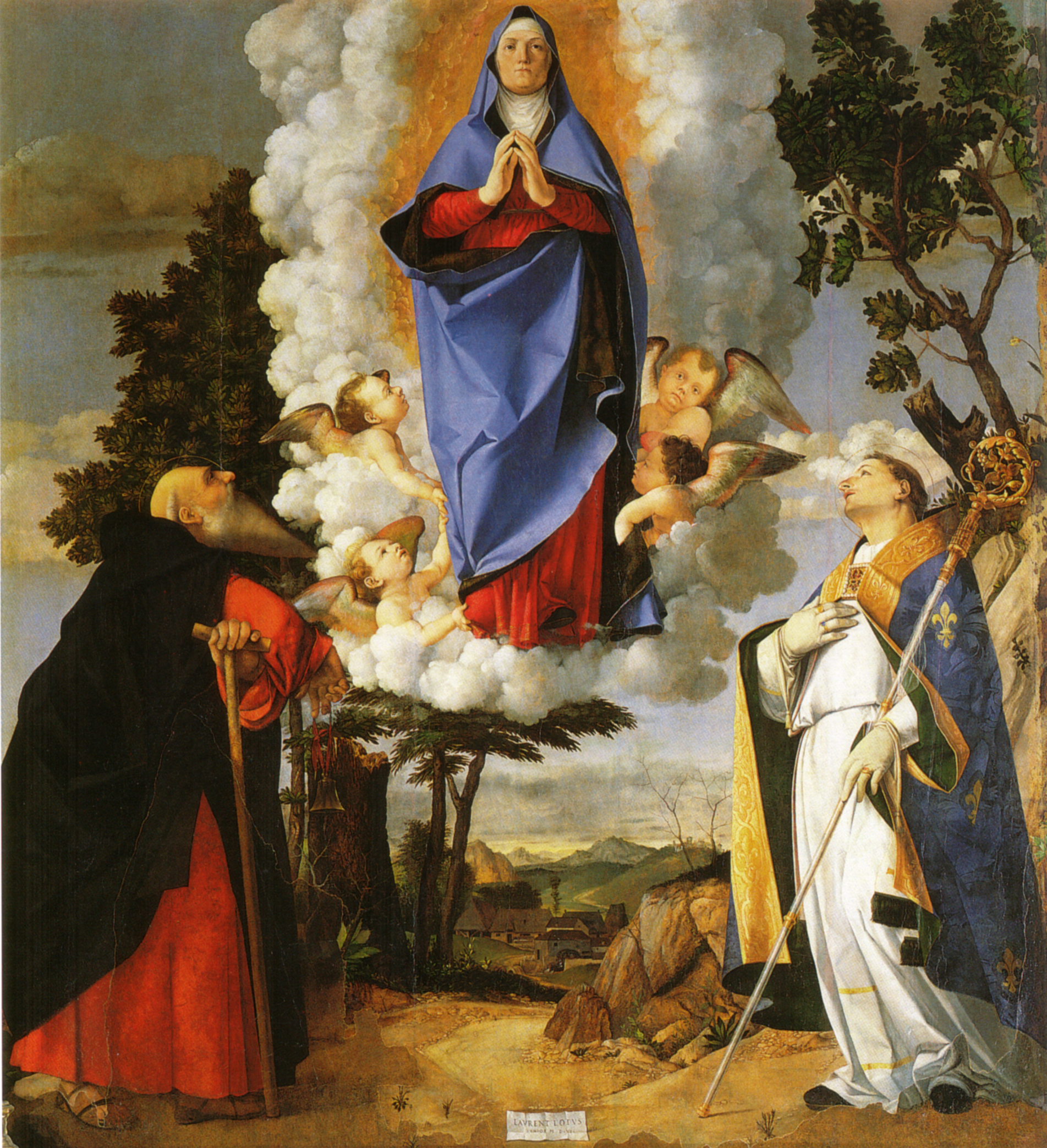
Lorenzo Lotto, the Asolo Altarpiece (1506)

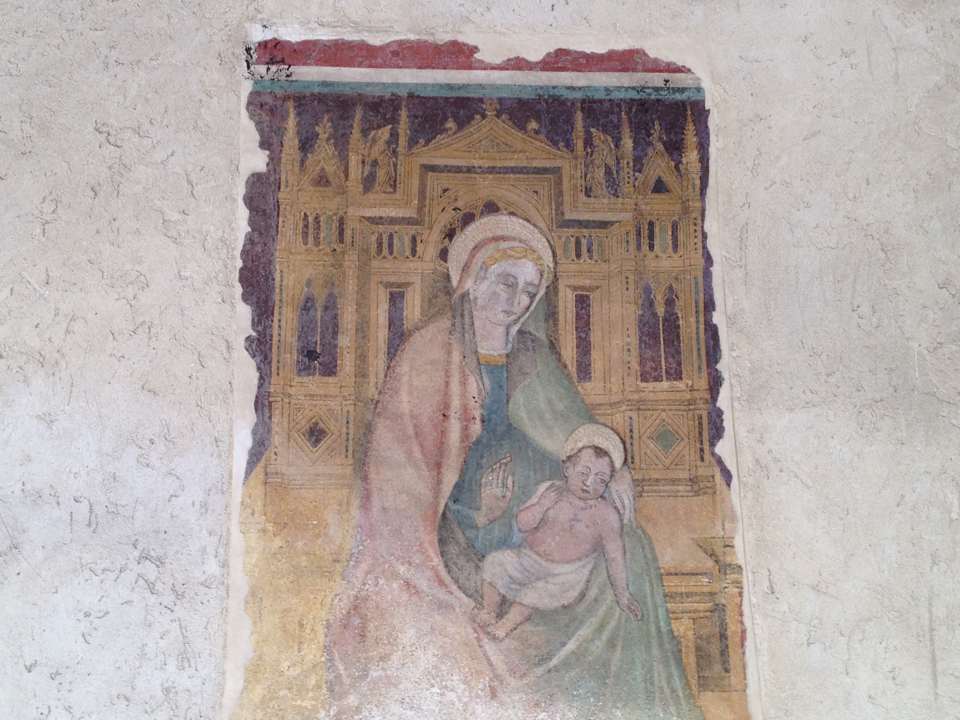
Fresco in the loggia of the civic museum

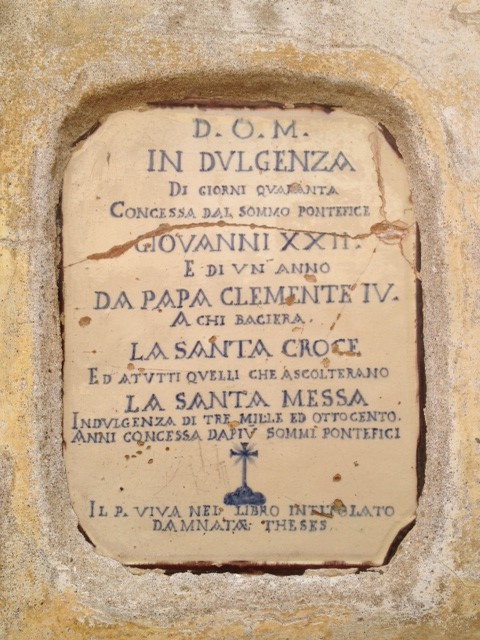
Terracotta plaque walled into the façade of the church of Santa Caterina

== Bibliography ==
- Giorgio Fossaluzza; Museo civico (Asolo, Italy) (2014). Il Museo civico di Asolo : opere dal Quattrocento al Novecento (in Italian). Crocetta del Montello (Tv, Italy): Antiga edizioni. p. 635. ISBN 9788897784395. OCLC 894896525.
