= Arnaldo Casella Tamburini =

Italian painter

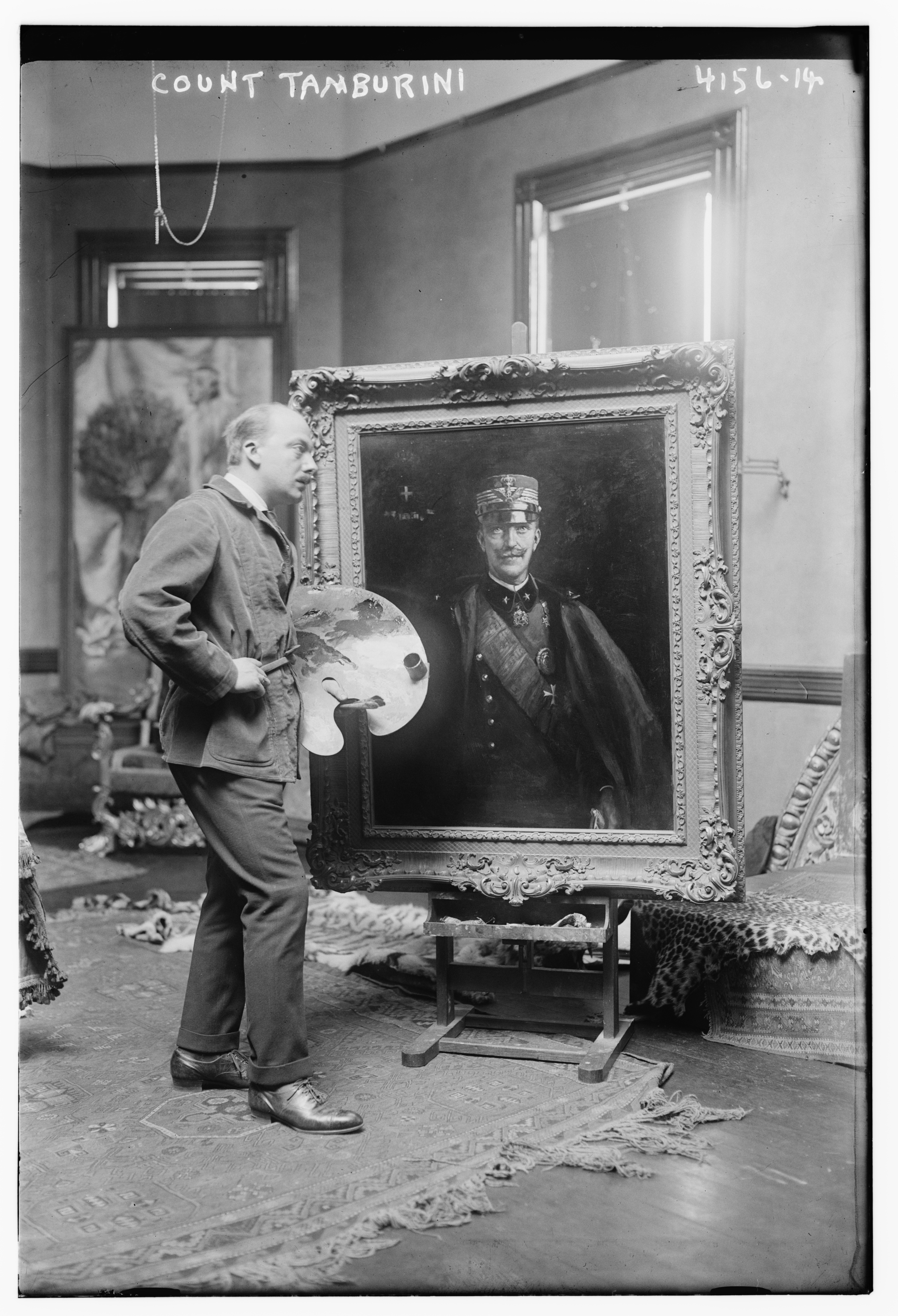
Arnaldo Casella Tamburini in 1917

Count Arnaldo Casella Tamburini, Jr. (January 24, 1885 - September 12, 1936) was an Italian artist who killed himself in Chicago, Illinois.

== Biography ==
He was born in Florence, Italy on January 24, 1885, to Arnaldo Casella Tamburini, Sr.

He killed himself on September 12, 1936, in Chicago, Illinois when he jumped from a second story window at St. Luke's Hospital where he had been hospitalized for mental illness.
