= Tenuta Fernanda Cappello =

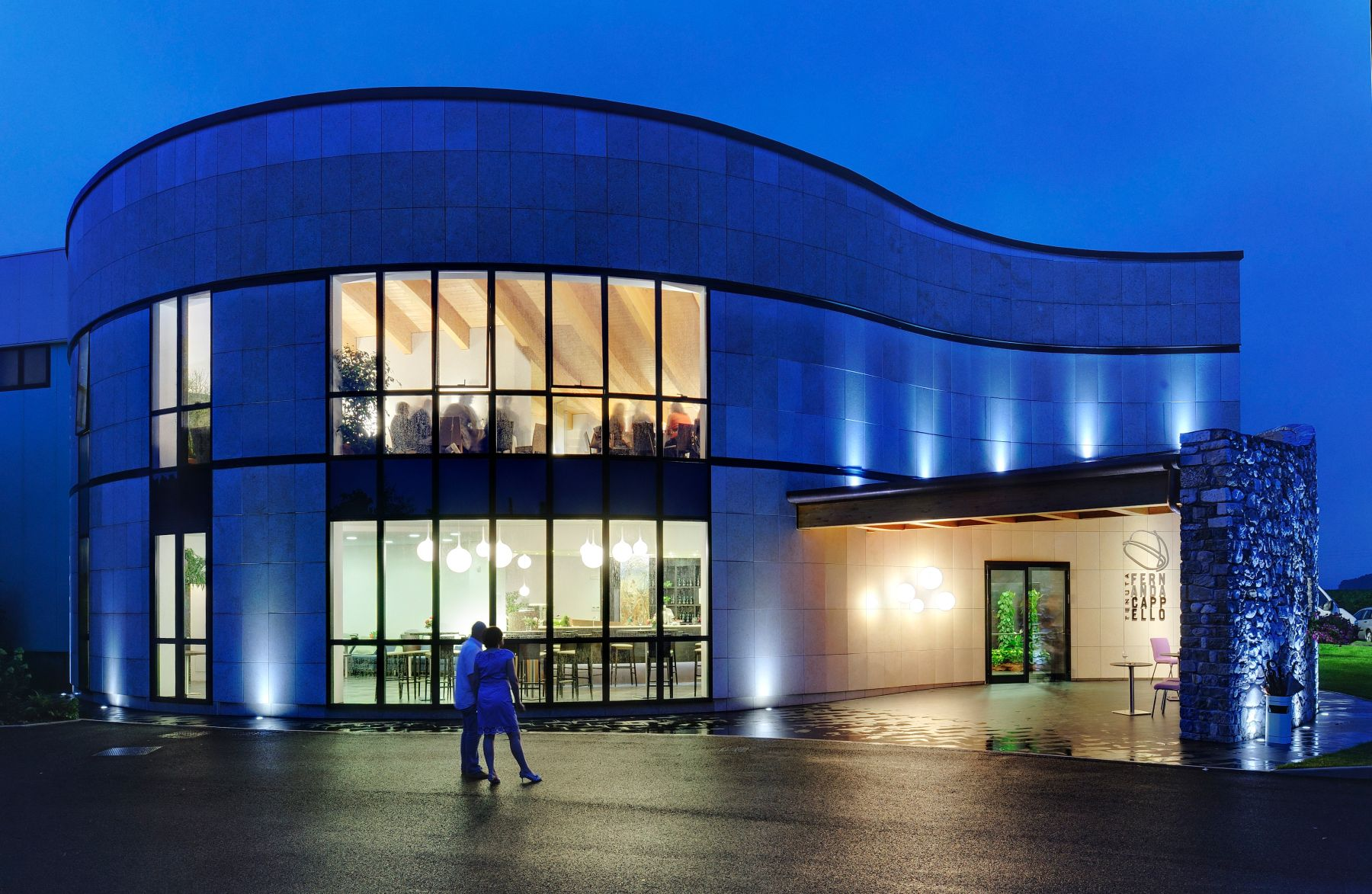
"Tenuta Fernanda Cappello" located Northeast Italy belonging with ALPS mountain of altitude 200 meters, border of Austria & Italy, between two rivers of Meduna River

Tenuta Fernanda Cappello is an Italian wine company that was founded in 1970. It locates in the Friuli region of Northeast Italy. Coming from the Cappello family, Fernanda Cappello currently leads this family business, the estate is in their Third-generation of production, the first release was in 1969.

== The company ==
The current owner of the wine company, lady Fernanda Cappello studied in the Ca' Foscari University of Venice and developed a successful career as an architect. After retirement, she returned to the family’s vineyards to continue her father's path in wine-making.

Nowadays, Tenuta Fernanda Cappello produces a variety of white wines such as Pinot Grigio, Sauvignon, Traminer Aromatico, Chardonnay, Friulano, Ribolla Gialla. Apart from white wines, it produces Cabernet Sauvignon, Cabernet Franc, Merlot, Refosco, some other sparkling wines including Prosecco, as well as a unique brand named Fernanda Spumante Millesimato.
