= Pignolo =

Pignolo (plural pignoli; also pinolo and pinoli) may refer to:

- Pine nut, seed from trees of the genus Pinus
- Any cookie with pine nuts:
  - Biscotto, twice baked cookie (biscuit), when made with pine nuts
  - Pignolo (macaroon), typical of Sicily
- Pignolo (grape), a wine grape typical of Friuli
  - Ribolla Gialla, another Italian/Slovenian wine grape that is also known as Pignolo
  - Bianchetta Trevigiana, Italian wine grape known as Pignolo bianco
- Pignolo, a heritage variety of maize; see Italian traditional maize varieties

== See also ==
- Pignola, a town in southern Italy and a variety of wine grape grown there
- Pinole, maize that is dried, toasted, ground, and cooked in liquid
