= Terrano =

Terrano may refer to:

- Nissan Frontier, a pickup truck
- Nissan Terrano, a restyled Dacia Duster sold in India and CIS countries
- Nissan Mistral (Terrano II), a sport utility vehicle
- Nissan Pathfinder, a sport utility vehicle
- Terrano or Teran, a Croatian, Italian and Slovenian dark-skinned wine grape variety
  - Mondeuse noire, a French wine grape that is also known as Terrano
