= Friuli Grave DOC =

Italian DOC wine region

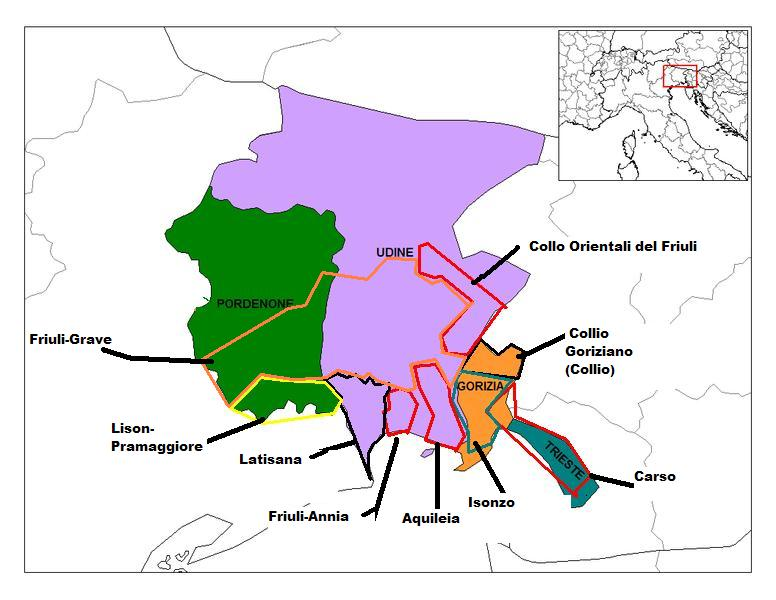
Approximate location of the regions of Friuli-Venezia Giulia wine

Friuli Grave (also Grave del Friuli) is a DOC wine region within Friuli-Venezia Giulia. The area has 16,000 acres (6500ha) of vineyards. The appellation is most known for white wines made from Chardonnay, Sauvignon Blanc, Pinot Grigio and Friulano. Pinot Grigio is the most important wine of the appellation, but some red wines are also produced under the Friuli Grave DOC. Reds include from the Bordeaux wine varieties Cabernet Sauvignon and Merlot, along with local variety Refosco dal Peduncolo Rosso. As in Graves wine, the name of the DOC comes from the gravelly soil.
