= Robola =

Variety of grape

Robola is a white Greek wine grape variety that is grown primarily on the Ionian island of Cephalonia. Historically the vine was thought to be the same variety as the Friuli wine grape Ribolla and was thought to have been brought to northeast Italy by Venetian merchants trading with Cephalonia in the 13th century. However, DNA profiling in the 21st century has cast doubt on that theory and today Robola is classified by the Vitis International Variety Catalogue (VIVC) as a separate variety.

== Viticulture and wine styles ==
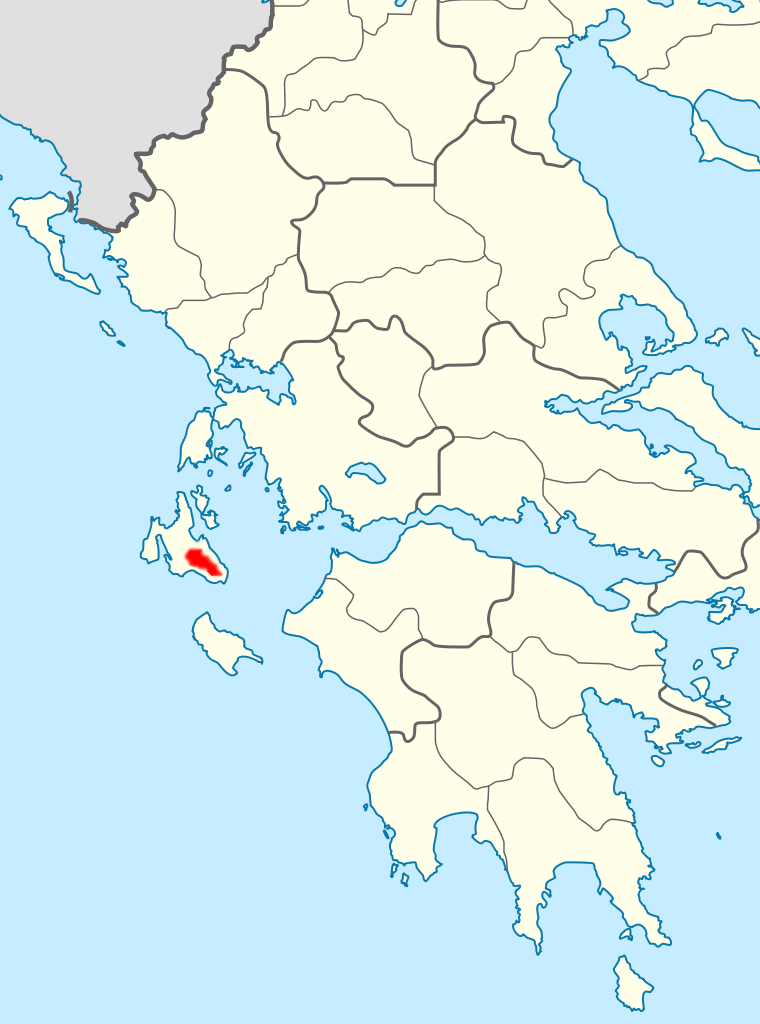
Robola is widely grown in the south eastern parts of the island of Cephalonia (highlighted in red).

On Cephalonia, Robola vines are often ungrafted in the limestone soils of the island. The vine is early ripening and can produce high acid wines with significant phenolic levels. Wines made from this grape tend to be dry, medium bodied with a distinct lemon note. According to wine expert Oz Clarke, Robola wines can have flinty character as well.

== Synonyms ==
Over the years Robola has been known under a variety of synonyms including Asporombola, Asprorobola, Asprorompola, Robbola, Robola Aspri, Robola Kerini, Rombola, Rombola Aspri and Rompola.
