= Ramandolo =

Wine

- Wine region
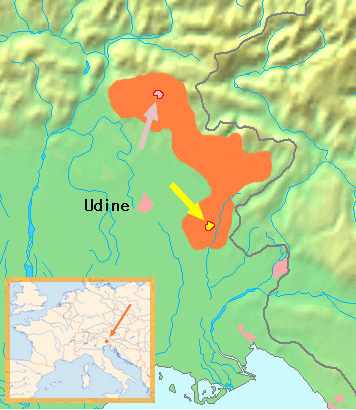
- DOC Colli Orientali del Friuli including DOCG Ramandolo and DOCG Colli Orientali del Friuli Picolit Cialla
- Type: DOCG
- Year established: 2001
- Country: Italy
- Part of: Friuli Colli Orientali
- Size of planted vineyards: 39 ha in 2015
- Varietals produced: Verduzzo
- Wine produced: 920 hl / 10,200 cases in 2016
- Comments: Sweet wines only

Ramandolo is a sweet white Italian wine from the village of the same name which is situated in the hills near Nimis in the Friuli-Venezia Giulia wine region of northeast Italy. It is made from a local variety of the Verduzzo grape. Since 2001, Ramandolo has been produced as a DOCG wine. Prior to this it was a subzone of the Colli Orientali del Friuli DOC.

== DOCG requirements ==
Verduzzo grapes destined for DOCG wine production are limited to a harvest yield no greater than 10 tonnes/ha with the grapes allowed to hang on the vine late in the season and may even receive extra drying after picking. This allows for a greater concentration of sugar which leaves a wine with noticeable residual sweetness even with the high minimum alcohol level of 14% required.

== Wine styles ==
Wine expert Peter Saunders describes well made examples of Ramandolo from favorable vintages as fragrant, full-bodied, slightly tannic and not too sweet. Karen MacNeil describes Ramandolo as having a copper sheen to its deep yellow color with herbal notes.
