= Slovenian wine =

Wine making in Slovenia

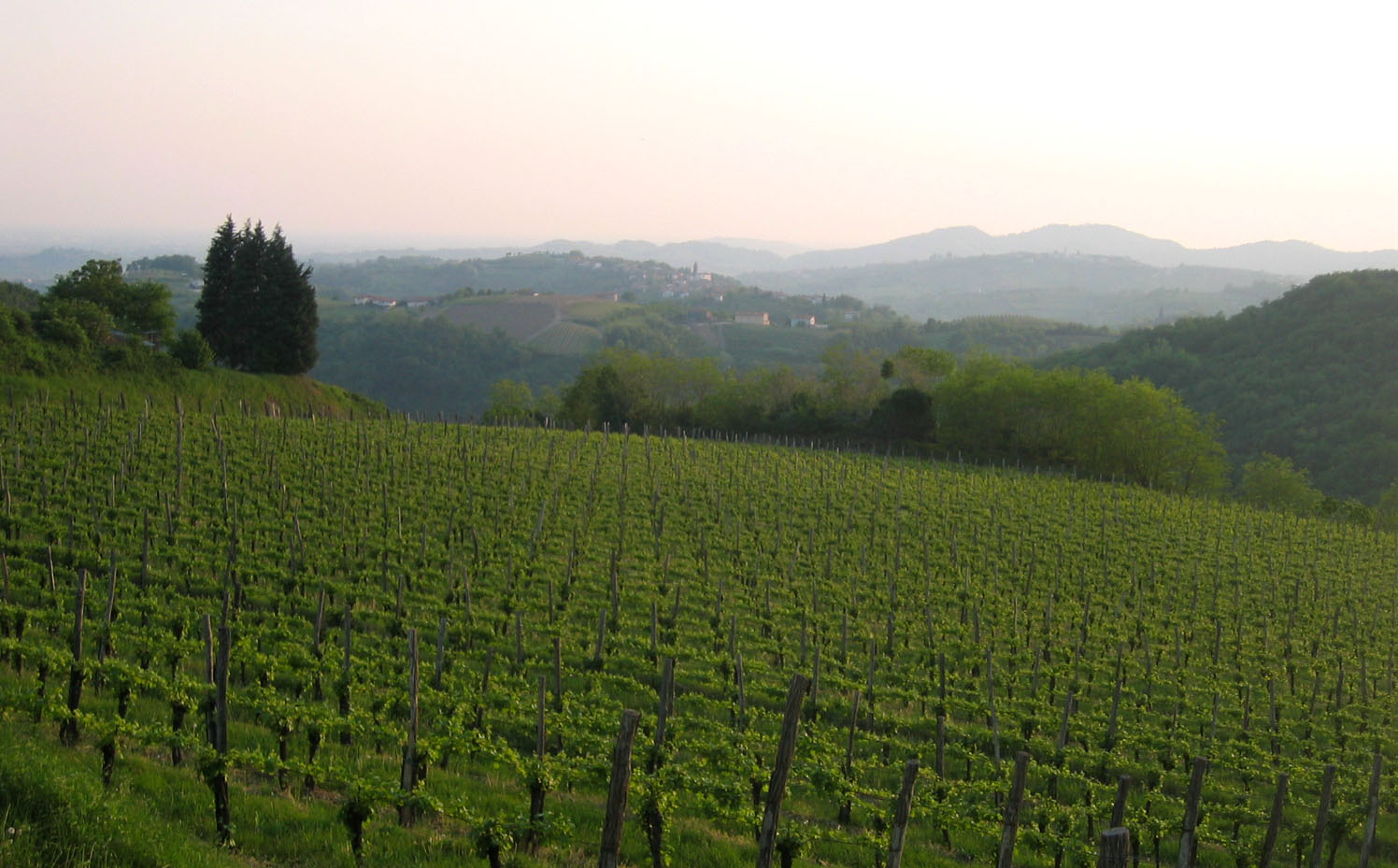
Vineyards in the Brda region

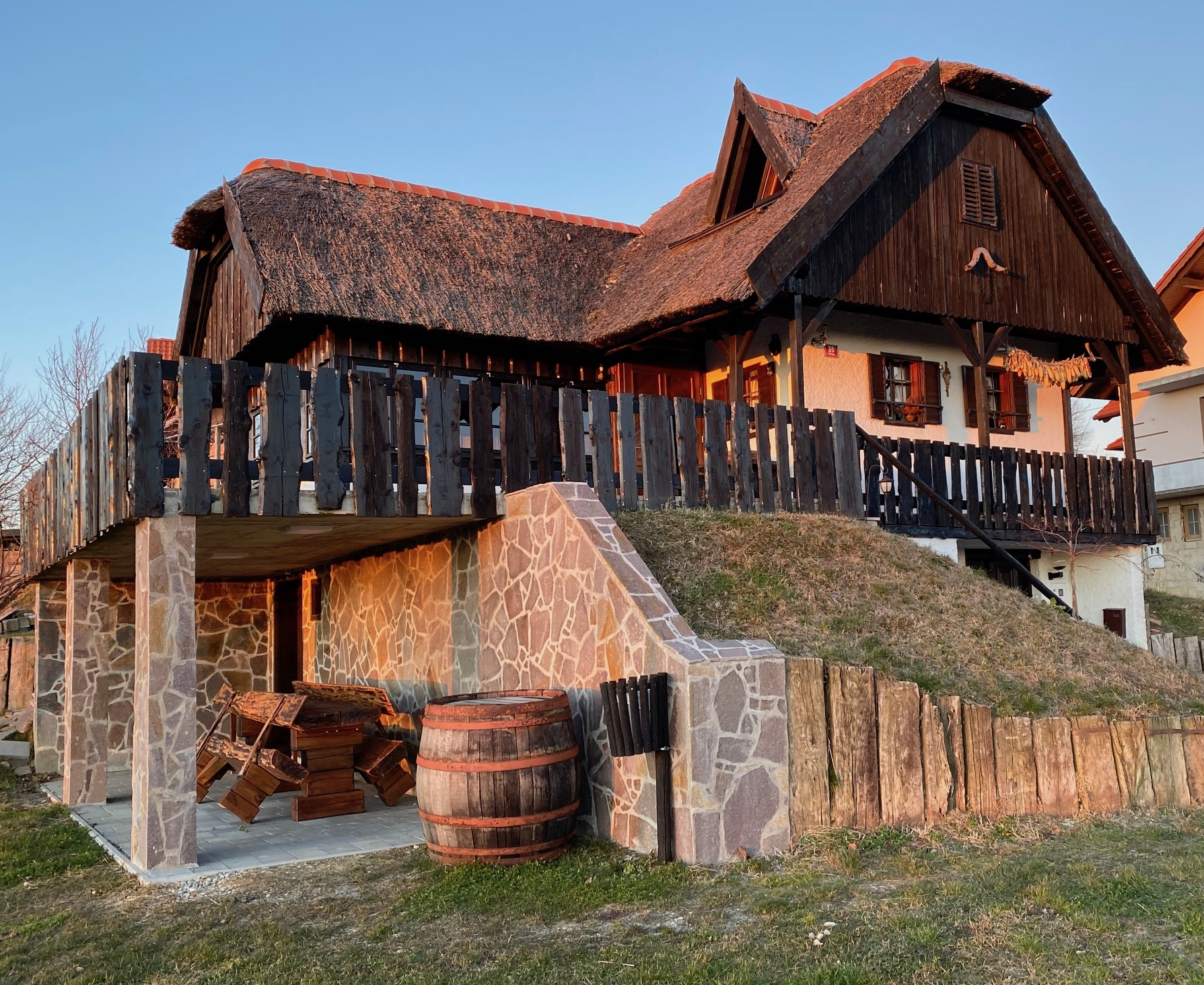
A traditional vineyard cottage in the Ptuj region

Slovenia has more than 28,000 wineries making between 80 and 90 million litres annually from the country's 22,300 hectares of vineyards. About 75% of the country's production is white wine. Almost all of the wine is consumed domestically with only 6.1 million L a year being exported—mostly to the United States, Bosnia and Herzegovina, Croatia, and lately the Czech Republic. Most of the country's wine production falls under the classification of premium (vrhunsko) wine with less than 30% classified as basic table wine (namizno vino). Slovenia has three principal wine regions: the Drava Wine-Growing Region, the Lower Sava Wine-Growing Region, and the Littoral Wine-Growing Region.

Viticulture and winemaking has existed in this region since the time of the Celts and Illyrians tribes, long before the Romans would introduce winemaking to the lands of France, Spain and Germany. In 2016, a research study based on DNA profiling and historical ampelographic sources showed that two international varieties of red grape, the Blaufränkisch and the Blauer Portugieser, likely originate from the Styria region of modern Slovenia.

== History ==
Unlike many of the major European wine regions, Slovenia's viticultural history predates Roman influences and can be traced back to the early Celtic and Illyrian tribes who began cultivating vines for wine production sometime between the 5th and 4th centuries BC. By the Middle Ages, the Christian Church controlled most of the region's wine production through the monasteries. Under the rule of the Austro-Hungarian Empire, privately owned wineries had some presence in the region but steadily declined following the empire's fall and the beginning of Yugoslavia. By the end of the Second World War, co-operatives controlled nearly all of the region's wine production and quality was very low as the emphasis was on the bulk wine production. The exception was the few small private wineries in the Drava Valley region that were able to continue operation.

In 1967, the government established the PSVVS (Business Association for Viticulture and Wine Production) which established testing practices for quality assurance and issued seals of approval for wines that met the organization's standards. In 1991, Slovenia was the first Yugoslav republic to declare independence. While the wine industry, as did other sectors of the Slovenian economy, experienced some decline following the turmoil of the Yugoslav wars, the region's strong ties to the West allowed the industry to quickly rebound. Today the Slovenian wine industry the most advanced and well developed of the former Yugoslav republics and is starting to gain interest in the world's wine market.

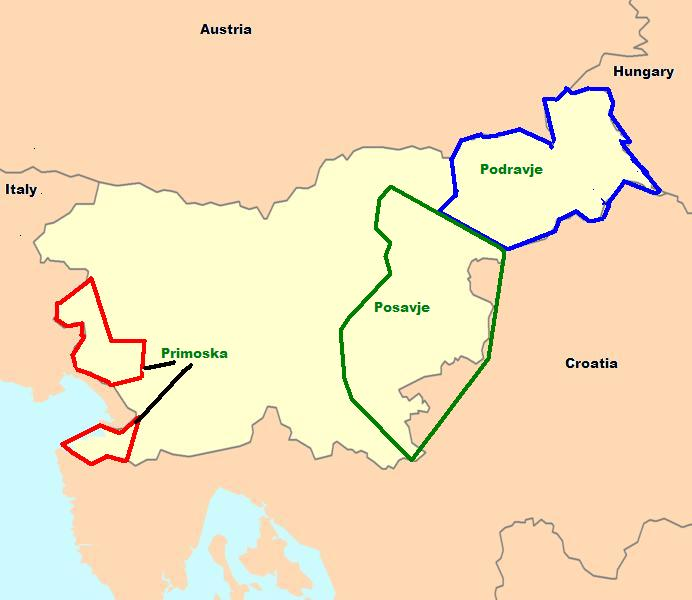
Slovenia's major wine regions

== Climate and geography ==
Slovenia has a diverse geography which provides a wide variety of microclimates. It is bordered to the north by Austria, separated by the Alps. To the west is Italy and the Adriatic Sea, Hungary to the east and Croatia forms the southern border. The region has a continental climate with cold, dry winters and hot summer. The far western regions of the Littoral have some Mediterranean influence. Some common viticultural hazards in the region include spring frost, drought during the growing season and summertime hail. Many of Slovenia's vineyards are located in the foothills of the Julian Alps and Karawanks and the Pannonian Plain. The Drava and Sava Rivers are major influences in the Drava Valley and Lower Sava Valley, respectively.

== Wine-growing regions ==
Slovenia has three main wine-growing regions (Slovene: vinorodne dežele) : the Littoral Region, encompassing the area of the traditional region of Slovene Littoral, the Lower Sava Region, which includes the Lower Sava Valley, the White Carniola, and the Lower Carniola, and the Drava Region, which includes the Drava Valley. The Littoral Region is Slovenia's most internationally known region. Though predominately a white wine producer, it is responsible for most of Slovenia's red wine production.

=== Littoral Region ===
The Littoral Wine-Growing Region (Primorska vinorodna dežela) has two of Slovenia's most widely known and prominent wine districts, the Gorizia Hills (Goriška brda) and Koper districts. It is subdivided into four districts. The Brda district borders the Italian wine region of Friuli-Venezia Giulia with the Gorizia Hills Denominazione di origine controllata (DOC). This region was one of the first in Slovenia to make a concentrated attempt at establishing an international reputation for quality. The area is planted with international varieties of Merlot, Cabernet Sauvignon, Chardonnay, Sauvignon blanc, Pinot gris (Sivi Pinot), and Pinot noir (Modri Pinot) as well as Ribolla Gialla (Rebula), Refosco (Refošk) and Friulano. Brda is best known for its Rebula white wine and Merlot-Cabernet blends.

The Koper district on the Istrian peninsula along the Adriatic coast is the warmest wine region in Slovenia. The Refosco and Malvazija grapes are the most widely planted in Koper. The Karst plateau district, located near the Italian city of Trieste, is known for the wine style Teran which is a very dark, highly acidic red wine made from Refosco planted in the region's red iron-rich soil. Other varieties grown in the region include Piccola nera.

The Vipava Valley district specializes in light, crisp white wines made from the local Pinela and Zelen grapes. Other grapes found throughout the Littoral region include Barbera, Pinot blanc (Beli Burgundec), Cabernet Franc, Cipro, Glera, Klarnica, Laški Rizling, Maločrn, Muscat, Syrah, and Vitovska Grganja.

=== Lower Sava Region ===
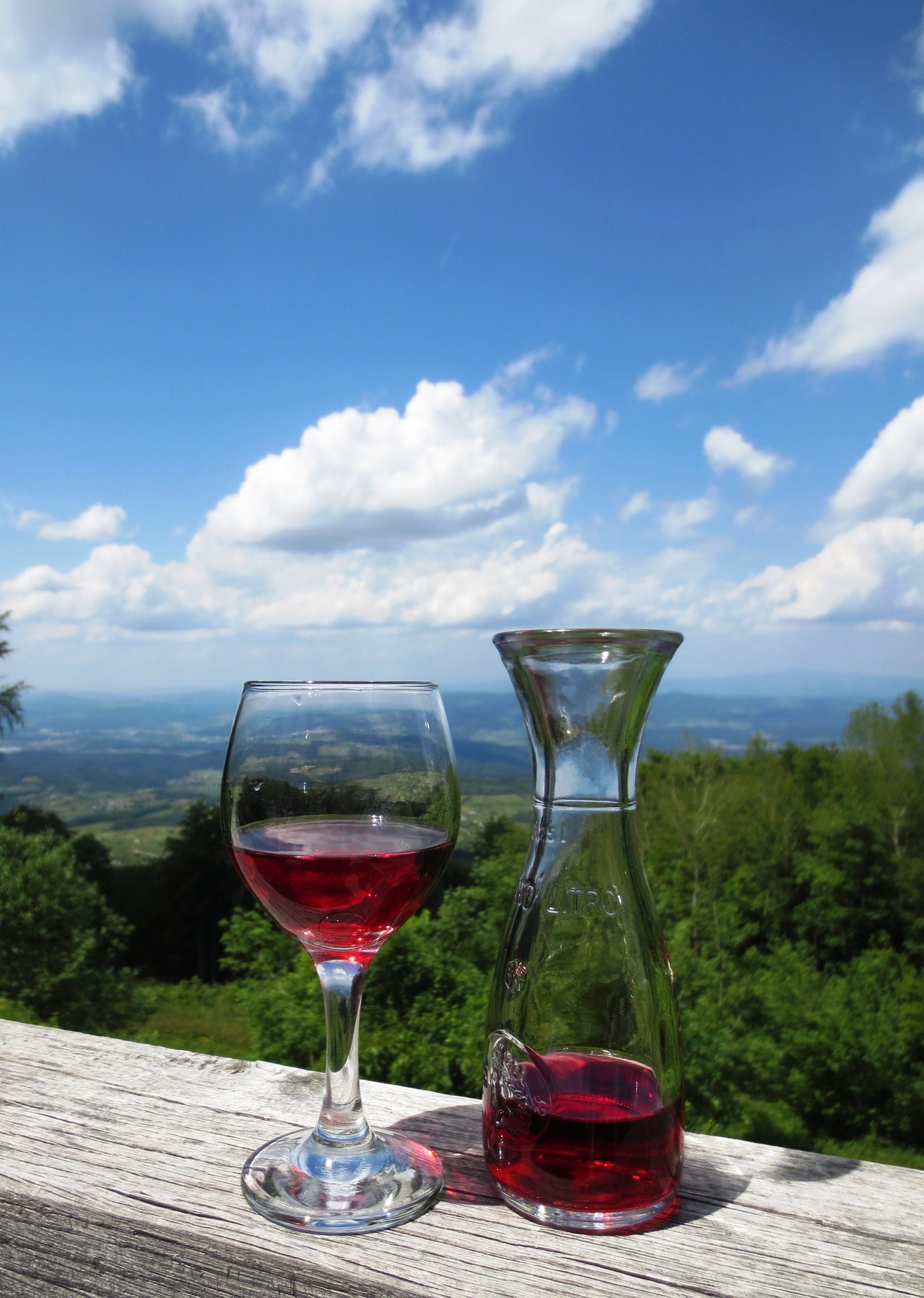
Wine of the Gorjanci region at Žumberak Mountains

The Lower Sava Wine-Growing Region (Posavska vinorodna dežela) is the only Slovenian wine region that produces more red wine than white, though not by a large margin. The area is subdivided into three districts. The Bizeljsko-Brežice district is known for its sparkling wine production and acidic white wines made from the Rumeni Plavec grape. The Lower Carniola district is known for its production of Cviček made from a blend of white and red wine grapes, most commonly Kraljevina and Žametovka. The White Carniola district is known for its red wine made from Blaufränkisch and Muscat. Other grapes found planted throughout The Lower Sava Valley include Pinot blanc, Cabernet Sauvignon, Chardonnay, Gamay, Pinot noir, Neuburger, Ranina, Rdeča Zlahtnina, Riesling, Šentlovrenka, Šipon, Sivi Pinot, Traminec, and Zweigelt. Currently the Lower Sava Valley region is dominated more by bulk wine, rather than premium wine, production.

=== Drava Region ===
The Drava Wine-Growing Region (Podravska vinorodna dežela) is the largest wine region in Slovenia and is subdivided into 7 districts. The Radgona-Kapela district was the first Slovenia wine region to produce sparkling (penina) wine using the méthode champenoise in 1852. The Ljutomer-Ormož district includes the village of Jeruzalem which is known for white wine made from Dišeči Traminec and Ranina. Along with Radgona-Kapela and the Maribor district, Ljutomer-Ormož produces some of the best examples of Drava Valley wine. While the Haloze district is improving in quality, that district along with the Prekmurje, Central Slovene Hills, and Šmarje-Virštanj districts have small production that is consumed locally. Nearly 97% of the wine made in the Drava Valley region is white wine. Other grape varieties found in the Drava Valley include Chasselas, Gamay, Kerner, Kraljevina, Muscat Ottonel, Blauer Portugieser, Ranfol, Rizvanec, Muscat, Zeleni Silvanec, Zlahtnina, and Zweigelt.

== Viticulture and winemaking ==
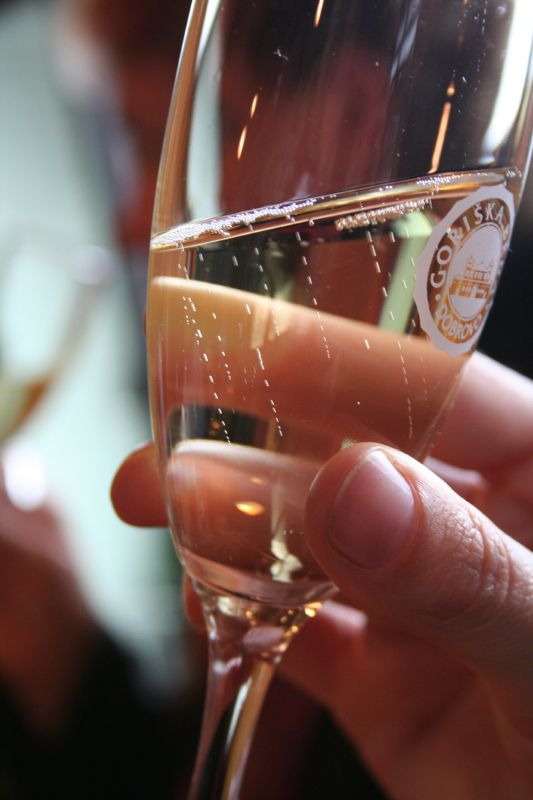
A sparkling wine from Brda

In Slovenia, many vineyards are located along slopes or hillsides in terraced rows. Historically vines were trained in a pergola style that optimizes fruit yields. However the emphasis on higher quality wine production has encouraged more vineyards to switch to a Guyot style of vine training. The steep terrain of most vineyards encourages the using of manual harvesting over mechanical.

Wines in Slovenia have traditionally followed the Austrian preference of single varietal over blended wines but the production of blended wines are on the rise. While wines were historically aged in large Slovenian or Slavonian wooden cask, the trend has been to use small and varying sizes of French and Slovenian oak barrels. In the Littoral both red and white wines often go through Malolactic fermentation with the Drava Valley and the Sava Valley typically using that technique only for red wine production. In the Littoral, dessert wines are made in a passito style with the Brda region specialize in wines made from Verduc and Pikolit. In the Drava Valley region, botrytized wines are produced from Welschriesling, Riesling, and Šipon and classified in a system similar to the German wine classification based on sweetness-ranging from pozna trgatev (Spätlese), izbor (Auslese), jagodni izbor (Beerenauslese), ledeno vino (Eiswein) and suhi jagodni izbor (Trockenbeerenauslese).

Slovenian wine acts stipulate that all wines must be submitted to chemical analysis and tastings prior to being released on the market. After testing the wines are assigned a quality level according to a system similar to the European Union's QWPSR system-Quality Wines Produced in Specified Regions. The quality categories are the following:

- Table wine (namizno vino)
- Country wine with a certified geographic emblem (deželno vino s priznano geografsko označbo, deželno vino PGO)
- Quality wine with protected geographic origin (kakovostno vino z zaščitenim geografskim poreklom, kakovostno vino ZGP)
- Premium quality wine with protected geographic origin (vrhunsko vino z zaščitenim geografskim poreklom, vrhunsko vino ZGP)

Slovenia wine labels include the sweetness level of the wines ranging from suho (dry), polsuho (medium-dry), polsladko (medium-sweet) and sladko (sweet). The special traditional name (posebno tradicionalno poimenovanje; PTP) designation is applied to a traditional Slovenia wine from a specific region. As of 2009, the PTP wines in Slovenia are the Karst wine Teran from the Slovenian Littoral, the Lower Carniolan wine Cviček, the White Carniolan wines Belokranjec and Metliška Črnina, and both the red and the white Bizeljčan from Bizeljsko-Sremič.

== See also ==
- Winemaking
- Agriculture in Slovenia
