= Tazzelenghe =

Variety of grape

- Grape (Vitis)
- Color of berry skin: Noir
- Species: Vitis vinifera
- Also called: See list of synonyms
- Origin: Friuli-Venezia Giulia
- VIVC number: 12291

Tazzelenghe is a red Italian wine grape variety from the Friuli Venezia Giulia region of northeast Italy. The grape is predominantly found in the Colli Orientali del Friuli Denominazione di origine controllata (DOC). The grape's name means "Tongue stinging" or "Tongue cutting".

== Synonyms ==
Tazzelenghe is also known under the synonyms Tace Lenghe, Tacelenge, Tacelenghe, Tassalinghe, Taze Lenghe, Taze Lunghe, Tazzalenghe, Tazzalenghe Nera, Tazzalenghe Nera Friulana, Tazzalinghe, Tazzalingua, and Tazzelanghe Nera Friulana.
