= Carso DOC =

Italian wine-producing zone

Carso – Kras is an Italian wine-producing zone located in the provinces Trieste and Gorizia in the Friuli-Venezia Giulia region, on the border with Slovenia. It was classified as a Denominazione di Origine Controllata (DOC) in 1985 and produces both red and white wine. It takes its name from the Karst Plateau and covers 57 hectares. It has produced 1, 080 hl total 2013/2014, with an average of 11, 240 cases bottled annually.

== Varieties and wine types ==
Traditionally, most of the red wine is produced from Terrano grapes, and the white wine primarily from Malvasia Istriana grapes. However, a number of international varieties are also in cultivation.

Carso DOC wine can be produced either as Carso Rosso, with a minimum of 70% Terrano and a maximum of 30% of other local grape varieties, such as Piccola nera, or as varietal Carso, with a minimum of 85% of the variety indicated and a maximum of 15% of other varieties allowed within the DOC zone. The following varietal Carso wines are allowed:

- Red wines
  - Carso Cabernet Sauvignon
  - Carso Cabernet Franc
  - Carso Merlot
  - Carso Refosco dal Peduncolo Rosso
  - Carso Terrano
- Dry white wines
  - Carso Chardonnay
  - Carso Malvasia
  - Carso Pinot grigio
  - Carso Sauvignon
  - Carso Traminer
  - Carso Vitovska
