= Piccola nera =

Variety of grape

Piccola nera is a red Italian and Slovenian wine grape variety that is grown in the province of Trieste within the Friuli-Venezia Giulia wine region and across the border in neighboring Slovenia where ampelographers believe that the grape originated. Piccola nera, whose name means "little black", tends to produce to light bodied red and rosé wines that are meant to be consumed young. It is a permitted variety in the Denominazione di origine controllata (DOC) wines of Carso where it is usually blended with Terrano and in Venezia Indicazione geografica tipica IGT classification where the grape can be used to make varietal wines.

== History and name origins ==
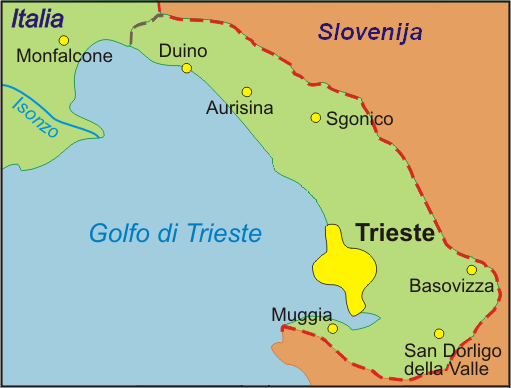
Piccola nera is believed to have originated along the border of Italy and Slovenia which includes the province of Trieste (map pictured).

Ampelographers believe that Piccola nera originated in the border region between Italy and Slovenia in what is now the province of Trieste in Italy and the Coastal–Karst Statistical Region of Slovenia. In Italian, the name Piccola nera means 'little black', which describes the small black-skinned berries of the grape vine.

== Viticulture and confusion with other grapes ==
Piccola nera is a late ripening grape variety that can be very vigorous and high yielding if not kept in check by winter pruning and later green harvesting during the growing season. In the Trentino-Alto Adige/Südtirol wine region of Italy, the grape is sometimes confused for the German/Italian wine grape Trollinger.

== Wine regions ==
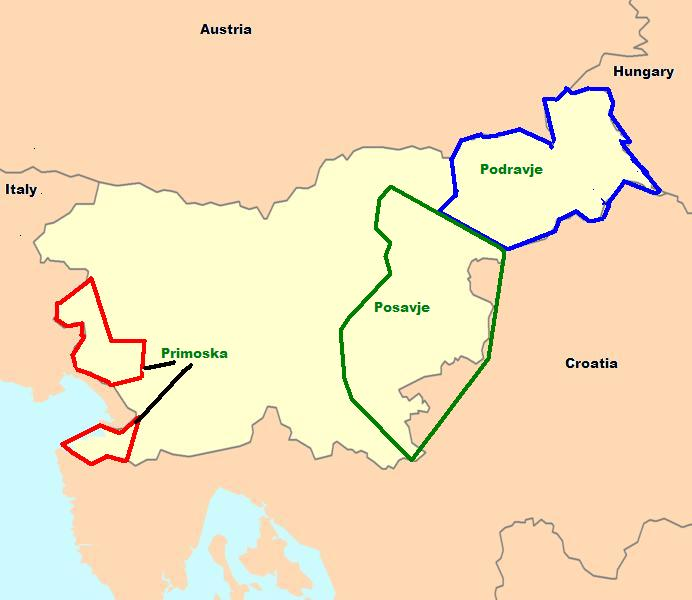
Outside of Italy, some plantings of Piccola nera can be found across the border in Slovenia in the Coastal–Karst Statistical Region, which makes up part of the Littoral wine region.

In 2000, there were 20 hectares (49 acres) of Piccola nera planted in Italy, the vast majority in the Trieste region with some plantings also found in the province of Trento where the grape is sometimes confused with Trollinger/Schiava Grossa. In Italy, Piccola nera is a permitted variety in the DOC red wines of the Carso DOC in the Friuli-Venezia Giulia region where it is usually blended with Terrano. The grape can be used to make varietal wines under the Venezia IGT classification.

Outside of Italy, Piccola nera can be found across the border in Slovenia.

== Styles ==
According to Master of Wine Jancis Robinson, Piccola nera tends to produce light-bodied and lightly colored red and rosé wines. These wines often have very little aging potential and are usually meant to be consumed young soon after the vintage.

== Synonyms ==
Over the years, Piccola nera has been known under a variety of synonyms including: Cerni Klescec, Drobna Cernina, Mala Cerna (in Slovenia), Naimenska Slaska, Negra Tenera, Nera Tener, Nera Tenera, Petit Raisin and Plavi Klescec.
