= Cagnina di Romagna =

Italian wine-producing zone

Cagnina di Romagna was an Italian wine-producing zone in Emilia-Romagna region, in northeastern Italy. In 2011 it was incorporated into the Romagna Denominazione di Origine Controllata (DOC) alongside the denominations of Pagadebit di Romagna, Romagna Albana Spumante, Sangiovese di Romagna, and Trebbiano di Romagna.

The local name of the Terrano, a grape of the Refosco family, is Cagnina. The term can still be found on wine labels from Romagna DOC provided a minimum of 85% of Terrano/Cagnina is used in the wine.

It makes a purple and red, fruit-scented, soft, slightly sweet red wine that is low in alcohol, low in acidity, and easy to sip.

Cagnina di Romagna is often served with Ciambella and roast chestnuts.
