= Friuli-Venezia Giulia wine =

Wine made in the northeastern Italian region of Friuli-Venezia Giulia

Coordinates: 45.6410°N 13.8070°E

Friuli Venezia Giulia
- Wine region
- Type: Italian wine
- Year established: 1968
- Years of wine industry: 1968–present
- Country: Italy
- Soil conditions: Mostly alluvial, clay, limestone, marl, sand
- Grapes produced: 60% white varieties, 40% red varieties
- Varietals produced: Red: Merlot, Cabernet Sauvignon, Cabernet Franc, Refosco, Schioppettino, Pignolo; White: Friulano, Ribolla Gialla, Pinot Grigio, Chardonnay, Sauvignon Blanc, Verduzzo
- Official designations: 2 DOCGs: Picolit, Ramandolo; 20+ DOCs including Collio, Colli Orientali del Friuli, Carso, Friuli Grave; Several IGTs including Friuli Venezia Giulia IGT

Location of Friuli Venezia Giulia wine region in Italy

Friuli-Venezia Giulia wine (or Friuli wine) is wine made in the northeastern Italian region of Friuli-Venezia Giulia. There are 11 denominazione di origine controllata (DOC) and 3 denominazione di origine controllata e garantita (DOCG) in the Friuli-Venezia Giulia area. The region has 3 indicazione geografica tipica (IGT) designations Alto Livenza, delle Venezie and Venezia Giulia. Nearly 62% of the wine produced in the region falls under a DOC designation. The area is known predominantly for its white wines, which are considered some of the best examples of Italian wine in that style. Along with the Veneto and Trentino-Alto Adige, the Friuli-Venezia Giulia forms the Tre Venezie wine region, which ranks with Tuscany and Piedmont as Italy's world class wine regions.

== History ==
The winemaking history of the Friuli-Venezia Giulia has been strongly influenced by the history of the Friuli and Venezia Giulia regions, that were important stops along the Mediterranean spice route from the Byzantine Empire to the trading center of Venice. During the Middle Ages, travelers passing through this area brought grapevines from Macedonia and Anatolia. Under the Habsburg reign, the French grape varieties were introduced. Prior to the phylloxera epidemic, over 350 grape varieties were grown in the region.

Following the phylloxera epidemic of the 19th century, winemaking in the Friuli region was very muted and did not begin to garner much attention till the 1970s. The international popularity of Pinot grigio in the 1980s and 1990s help to change the dynamic of Friuli-Venezia Giulia winemaking. Prior to this time, vineyard owners sold their grapes in bulk to co-ops and négociant-like wineries that would blend the grapes together. With the success of Mario Schiopetto in bottling and marketing the product of his own vineyard, other vineyard owners followed suit and began opening up small wineries of their own.

== Climate and geography ==
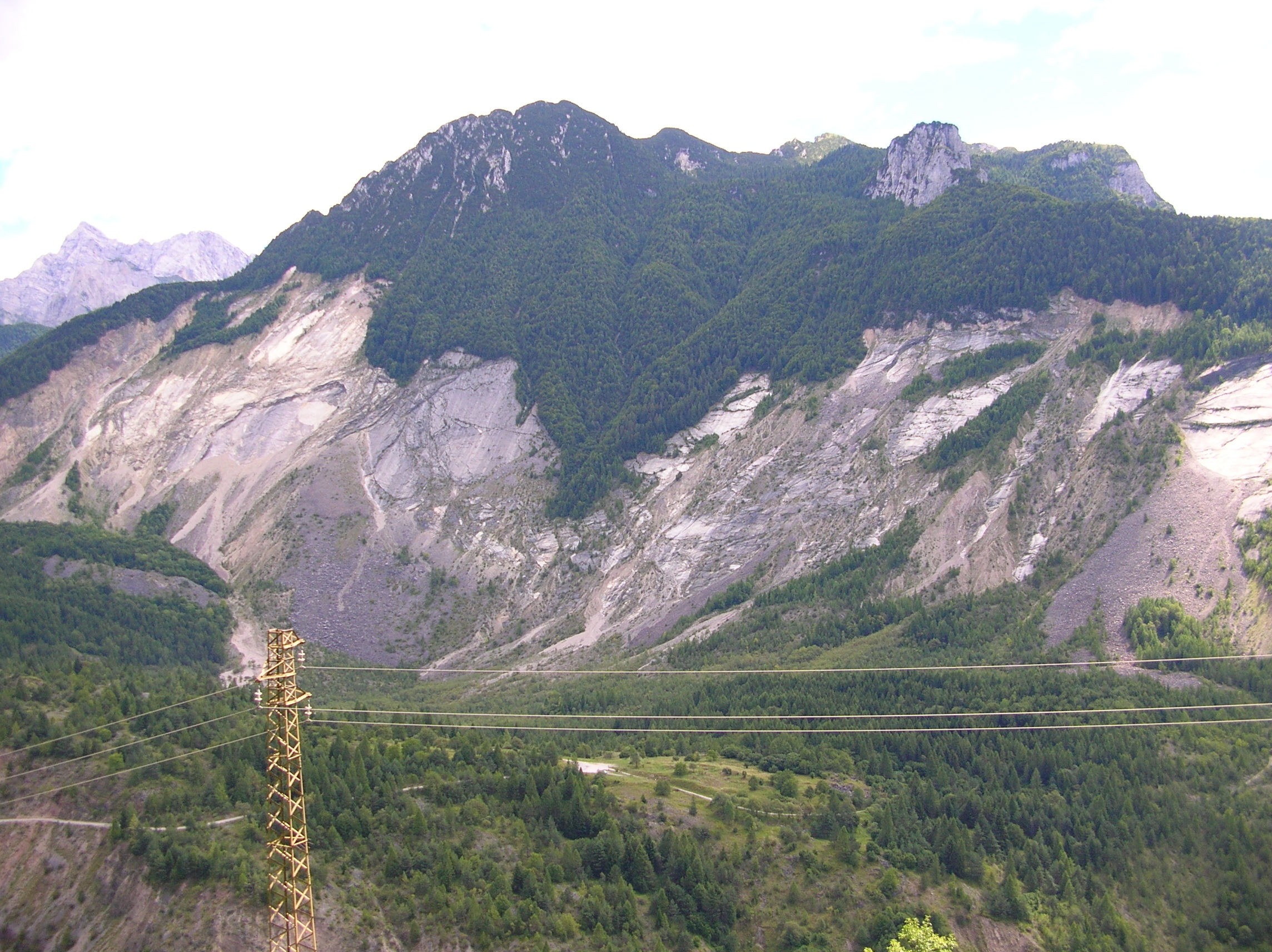
Monte Toc along the border between Friuli-Venezia Giulia and the Veneto

The Friuli-Venezia Giulia region is bordered by the Alps to the north separating it from Austria. Slovenia borders the region on the east and the Italian region of Veneto forms the western border and part of the southern border with the Adriatic Sea. The northern half is very mountainous and gives way to flatter terrain and plains on the way to the sea. The climate is distinguished with very warm days and chilly nights, that help maintain a balance in the grape between acidity and sugar levels and allows the grapes a long, slow growing season. In summertime the mean temperature is around 73 °F (22.8 °C) with rainfall averaging 60 inches (1,530 mm). Harvest normally takes place in September. The soils of the region vary from the calcium rich marl and flysch sandstone in the more hilly regions to clay, sand and gravel in the valley. The names of Friuli vineyards and wine estates often include the word ronco (plural ronchi), which is the Friulian word for a terraced hillside.

== Wine regions ==
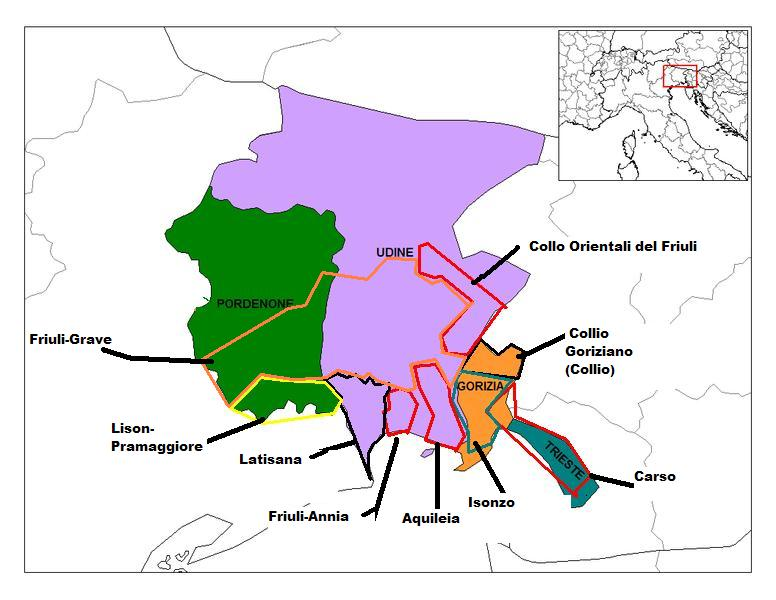
Approximate location of the wine regions of the Friuli-Venezia Giulia

Most of the vineyards of the Friuli-Venezia Giulia are located in the southern half of the region, including the large wine regions of Collio Goriziano, Colli Orientali del Friuli, Isonzo and Carso. The Lison-Pramaggiore region is shared with the Veneto. Smaller regions such as the Annia, Aquileia, Grave and Latisana are located in the central and western part of the region, around the city of Pordenone. These smaller regions are located on alluvial plains with soils composed of gravel and sand. The wines made here are lighter and less elegant than the Friuli wines made in the major southern wine regions. Unlike other Friuli regions which require 100%, a varietal wine in the Graves and Aquileia zones only need 85% of the grape variety, with the Latisana and Annia zones requiring 90%. More red wine is produced in these zones than in the rest of the Friuli, with Merlot, Cabernet Franc and Cabernet Sauvignon being the leading varietals. With wine production still, frizzante and spumante styles are produced from Chardonnay, Pinot bianco, Pinot grigio, Friulano and Verduzzo.

=== Collio and Colli Orientali del Friuli ===
The southeast province of Gorizia is home to the DOCs of the Collio region, most notably Collio Goriziano. Part of the region's vineyards extend over the border with Slovenia, but none of the Slovenian Wines can bear the designation Collio. The area benefits from its location among the foothills of the Alps, where the cool winds that come off the Adriatic moderate the climate. The cool air helps maintain the acidity levels in the grape. The region's best vineyards are found in the clay and sandstone soil around the comune of Cormons. The region is dominated by white wine production, making five times more white than red wine. Collio wine is typically full bodied and rich, made as a varietal or blend of Friulano, Ribolla Gialla, Malvasia Istriana, Chardonnay, Pinot bianco, Pinot grigio and Sauvignon blanc. Red wine under the designation Collio Rosso is made from a blend of Merlot, Cabernet Franc and Cabernet Sauvignon. The general Collio Bianco designation can also include the white grapes Müller-Thurgau, Picolit, Riesling, Traminer and Welschriesling, as well as the white juice from the red wine grapes of Cabernet Sauvignon and pinot noir.

Located to the northwest of the Collio Goriziano, the Colli Orientali del Friuli DOC shares similar vineyard soils and climate as the Collio region. The grape varieties are also similar, though Ribolla Gialla and Picolit takes a more prominent role, here as does the local grape Verduzzo. The three grapes are used to make varietal wines under the Colli Orientali del Friuli DOC. Picolit is known particularly for the quality of the dessert wine it produces and has 2 DOCG dedicated to its production in Udine. Red wine production is also more prominent in this region, though it is still less than half the production of white wine. The red wines include varietal forms of Merlot, Cabernet Franc and Cabernet Sauvignon, as well as red wines made from the local Pignolo, Refosco, Refosco dal Peduncolo Rosso, Schioppettino and Tazzelenghe. The region is divided into 3 sub districts which include Ramandolo in the north and the DOCG of the same name, as well as the dessert wine Verduzzo di Ramandolo. In the center of the zone is the Cialla district, which makes dry wines under the designation Cialla Bianco and Cialla Rosso, as well as sweet and off dry wines made from Picolit and Verduzzo. Other notable wines from this district include Refosco dal Peduncolo Rosso and Cialla Schioppettino. The far southern district is the Corno di Rosazzo, which is heavily planted with Ribolla Gialla, that is believed to have originated in the vineyards of the local abbey over 1,000 years ago. The area is also known for its off-dry to sweet Rosazzo Picolit and dry Rosazzo Pignolo.

=== Isonzo and Carso ===
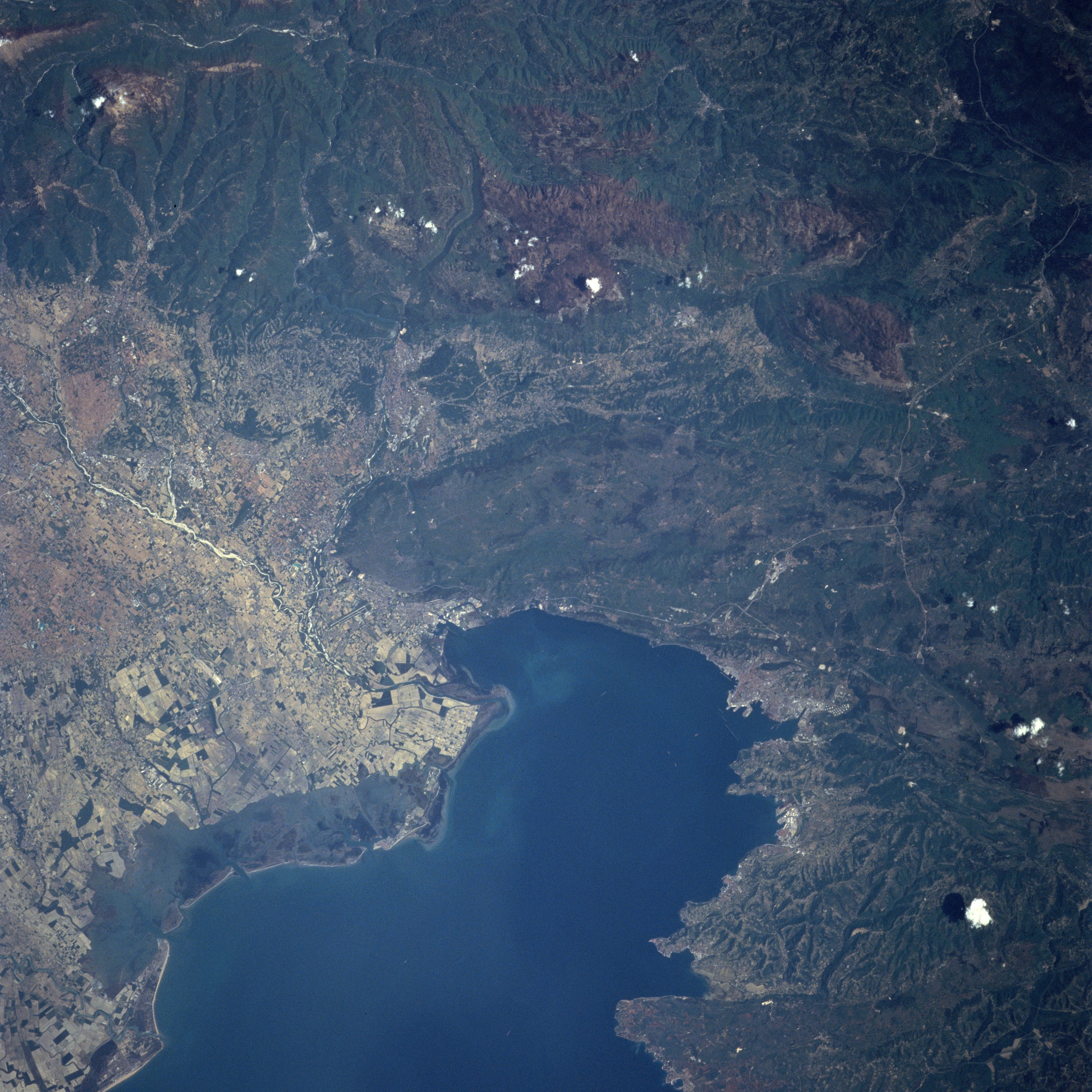
The Gulf of Trieste borders the western half of the Carso wine region and the southern portion of Isonzo.

The Isonzo and Carso wine regions are located in the far southeastern part of Friuli-Venezia Giulia, bordering Slovenia. The Isonzo region is located on a plain of alluvial deposits directly south of Collio, along the Isonzo River. The best vineyards are located in the northeast, close to Cormons. The wine regions predominately have a maritime climate with more rainfall than other Friuli regions. The region is known for its sparkling Pinot bianco as well as dry white wines made from Chardonnay, Malvasia Istriana and Sauvignon blanc. Other Isonzo DOC designated wines include dry, off dry and sparkling wines made from Gewürztraminer, Cabernet franc, Cabernet Sauvignon, Franconia, Moscato Giallo, Moscato Rosa, Pinot grigio, Pinot nero, Refosco, Riesling, Schioppettino, Friulano, Verduzzo and Welschriesling. The Vendemmia Tardiva is a late harvest wine made from a varietal style or blend of Chardonnay, Pinot bianco, Friulano and Verduzzo.

Located south of the Isonzo zone, near the city of Trieste, is the Carso zone. Situated on the Istrian Peninsula, the wine region has a maritime climate that is well suited to production of the local Terrano, used to make red wine. Wines made from this grape are known for their high acidity and good food pairing with Slavic cuisine. The white wines made from the Malvasia Istriana are highly regarded for their honey-almond notes. Other Carso wines can be made from the following grapes; Vitovska, Cabernet Franc, Cabernet Sauvignon, Chardonnay, Merlot, Pinot grigio, Sauvignon blanc, Traminer and Piccola nera.

== Viticulture and winemaking ==
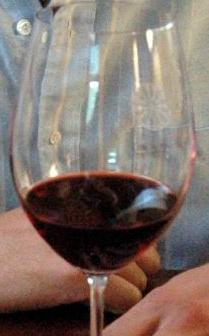
A glass of Refosco from Friuli

The best vineyards in the Friuli-Venezia Giulia are located on the south facing slopes of the Alps foothills, in the southern part of the region, where they can benefit from the most direct sunlight to go along with the night-time cool breezes from the Adriatic. The vineyard yields of the Friuli are among the lowest in Italy averaging 3.5 tons an acre. This is a result of the Friuli quest for high quality over quantity in their wines and also a reason why these wines tend to be more costly than other Italian whites.

While white wine dominates Friuli wine production, nearly 40% of the production is red with Merlot being the leading red wine grape. In the 1960s, winemakers of the Friuli-Venezia Giulia pioneered modern techniques for white winemaking in Italy, by quickly getting juice off the grape skins and taking extra measures to prevent oxidation. Through Italy these techniques came to be known as the metodo friulano or "Friuli method". Most Friuli wines are made in varietal form, with most appellations in the region requiring wines to be made with 100% of one grape, but distinguished blends are also made. The general philosophy of Friuli winemakers (especially in regards to their white wines) is to emphasise the grape's pure fruitiness and acidity without the masking effects of oak. To this extent, the Friulians more closely resemble the Alsatians and winemakers of the Loire Valley than their counterparts in Burgundy, Spain and other parts of Italy.

From the mid-1990s there has been a revival of amber wine production in the Friuli, which involves leaving the white wine grapes in extended maceration with their grape skins. The resulting wines have a hint of color pigments that give them an orange hue.

=== Grapes and wines ===
Over 30 different grapes varieties are grown in the Friuli-Venezia Giulia, including international varieties such as Chardonnay, Cabernet Sauvignon and Merlot, as well as local varieties like Refosco dal Peduncolo Rosso, Schioppettino, Friulano, Ribolla Gialla and Verduzzo. Of the local varieties, Friulano is the most well known and important variety, producing crisp, floral wines that develop notes of nuts and fennel as it ages. The grape was widely known as Tocai Friulano, but in 2006 the European Union banned names that have some similarity or association with the Hungarian wine Tokaji. Now Tocai Friulano is called Friulano. The very acidic Ribolla Gialla grape was primarily used as a blending component until winemakers started to apply the techniques used with Chardonnay (such as malolactic fermentation) to produce softer, more buttery wines, that still retain the crisp, lemon edge of the grape. Wines made from Verduzzo have peach and nutty flavors in their youth, but develop more honeyed flavors as the wine ages. The high acidity of the grape works well in sweet production and in regions like Ramandolo it is often dried to make a passito wine. The Picolit grape also does well in sweet wines, where it can produce elegant, floral wines that have a dry finish. In contrast to the thin, sometimes bland Pinot grigio produced in other parts of the Tre Venezie, well made examples of Friuli Pinot grigio are known for their fuller body and delicate peach, almond and green apple flavors. Sauvignon blancs are made in a style reminiscent of Sancerre with smoke, herbs and elements of honey and hazelnut. Some of the most expensive Friuli wines are made from the Picolit grape, which is prone to grape diseases and mutations which cause the vine to lose its flowers and grape clusters. In most years, less than half of a vineyard Picolit crop will survive and be able to make wine. The light, honeyed dessert wine that it can produce is often in high demand because of restricted supply.

Along with the internationally styled Merlots, Friuli produces some distinctive red wines from the local grape varieties. Tazzelenghe (meaning "tonguecutter") produces a very tannic and fruity wine, that mellows as it ages but maintains a good amount of its fruitiness. The Schioppettino (meaning "gunshot" and sometimes called Ribolla Nera) also produces very tannic wines with spice and pepper notes behind the ripe fruit flavors. The best known local red wine variety is the Refosco dal Peduncolo Rosso (different from regular Refosco), which produces a herbal full-bodied wine that ages well. Refosco is noted for its high acidity with blueberry and blackberry notes.

In 2008, DNA analysis showed that the Friuli table grape Refosco di Guarnieri was identical to the Venetian wine grape Trevisana nera.

== See also ==
- Vini Lunardelli – Friuli winery known for their controversial wine labels
