= Schioppettino =

Variety of grape

- Grape (Vitis)
- Species: Vitis vinifera
- Also called: Pokalza, Ribolla Nera (more)
- Origin: Slovenia/Italian border region
- Notable regions: Friuli-Venezia Giulia
- Notable wines: Colli Orientali del Friuli Rosso, Cialla Schioppettino, Isonzo Rosso
- VIVC number: 10830

Schioppettino (pronounced [skjoppetˈtiːno]; meaning "gunshot" or "little crack", also known as "Ribolla Nera") is a red Italian wine grape grown predominantly in the Friuli Venezia Giulia region of northeast Italy. The grape is believed to have originated between the comune of Prepotto and the Slovenian border, where records of the Schiopettino wine being used in marriage ceremonies date to 1282. The grape was nearly lost to extinction following the phylloxera epidemic of the late 19th century, when vineyard owners decided against replanting the variety in favor of French wine grapes like Cabernet franc, Cabernet Sauvignon, Pinot gris, Sauvignon blanc and Merlot. Some isolated plantings continued to exist until a 1978 European Union decree encouraged its planting in the province of Udine.

== Viticulture and wine ==
Today the Vitis vinifera grape is a prominent planting in the Colli Orientali del Friuli Denominazione di origine controllata (DOC), where it produces very aromatic, medium bodied wines, with Rhône-like qualities of deep dark coloring, with violet, raspberry and pepper notes. In addition to thriving in the Prepotto area, the grape also seems to do well in the Buttrio-Manzano area. The grape's high acidity and low alcohol levels bodes well for a semi-sparkling style that is mostly consumed domestically and rarely exported.

== Wine regions ==
Today the grape is found mostly in the Friuli-Venezia Giulia region and Slovenia. It is used most notably in the wines from Prepotto, Colli Orientali del Friuli Rosso, Cialla Schioppettino and Isonzo Rosso.

=== United States ===
The grape was first planted in the United States in the Russian River Valley wine region of California. The first Schioppettino varietal wine in North America was made in 2004 by Holdredge Wines in Healdsburg, California. In addition, Matthiasson Wines in Napa, Orsi Family Vineyards in Healdsburg, Preston Farm and Winery in Healdsburg, and Andis Wines in the Sierra Foolhills (Plymouth) grow and produce Schioppettino.

=== Australia ===
Schioppettino was introduced into Australia in 2005 by Chalmers Nurseries in Heathcote, and first commercially vinified in 2016. Schioppettino wines are being produced by several producers in Australia, including as low alcohol and natural wines.

== Synonyms ==
Schioppettino has been known under a variety of synonyms: Pocalza, Ribolla Nera, Schioccoletto, Schiopetino and Scoppiettino.
