= Refosco dal Peduncolo Rosso =

Variety of grape

- Grape (Vitis)
- Color of berry skin: Noir
- Species: Vitis vinifera
- Also called: See list of synonyms
- Origin: Member of the Refosco family. Believed to have originated in Italy.
- Notable regions: Friuli-Venezia Giulia, Slovenia, Veneto
- Hazards: Late ripening
- VIVC number: 9987

Refosco dal Peduncolo Rosso is a red Italian wine grape grown predominantly in the Friuli Venezia Giulia region of northeast Italy. The grape is a variety in the Refosco family (which also includes e.g. Terrano) and derives its name from its red stems. It is found in the Denominazione di origine controllata (DOC) of Colli Orientali del Friuli, Friuli Aquileia, Friuli Grave and Friuli Latisana. It is also found in the Veneto portion of the Lison Pramaggiore and in the Slovenian wine region of Koper. In Slovenia, Refosco dal Peduncolo Rosso and Refosco are both called Terrano and are commonly used in a field blend.

== History ==
Like the other Refosco grapes, the origins of Refosco dal Peduncolo Rosso are not completely known but current evidence suggest that it is indigenous to Italy. The grape was well known in antiquity and it or a similar variety was praised by the Roman writer Pliny the Elder in the first century for the quality of wine it produced. In 1390, the Italian writer Francesco di Manzano noted that wine made from Refosco dal Peduncolo Rosso was the favorite of Augustus's wife Livia. Beginning in the 1980s, the grape experienced a revival in interest along with other Friuli-Venezia Giulia grapes, and more wines made from the grape were exported internationally. Ampelographers have long thought Refosco dal Peduncolo Rosso was related to the Marzemino grape of the San Michele all'Adige region of Trentino. In the early 21st century, DNA profiling confirmed that Refosco dal Peduncolo Rosso was a parent of Marzemino.

== Viticulture and wine ==
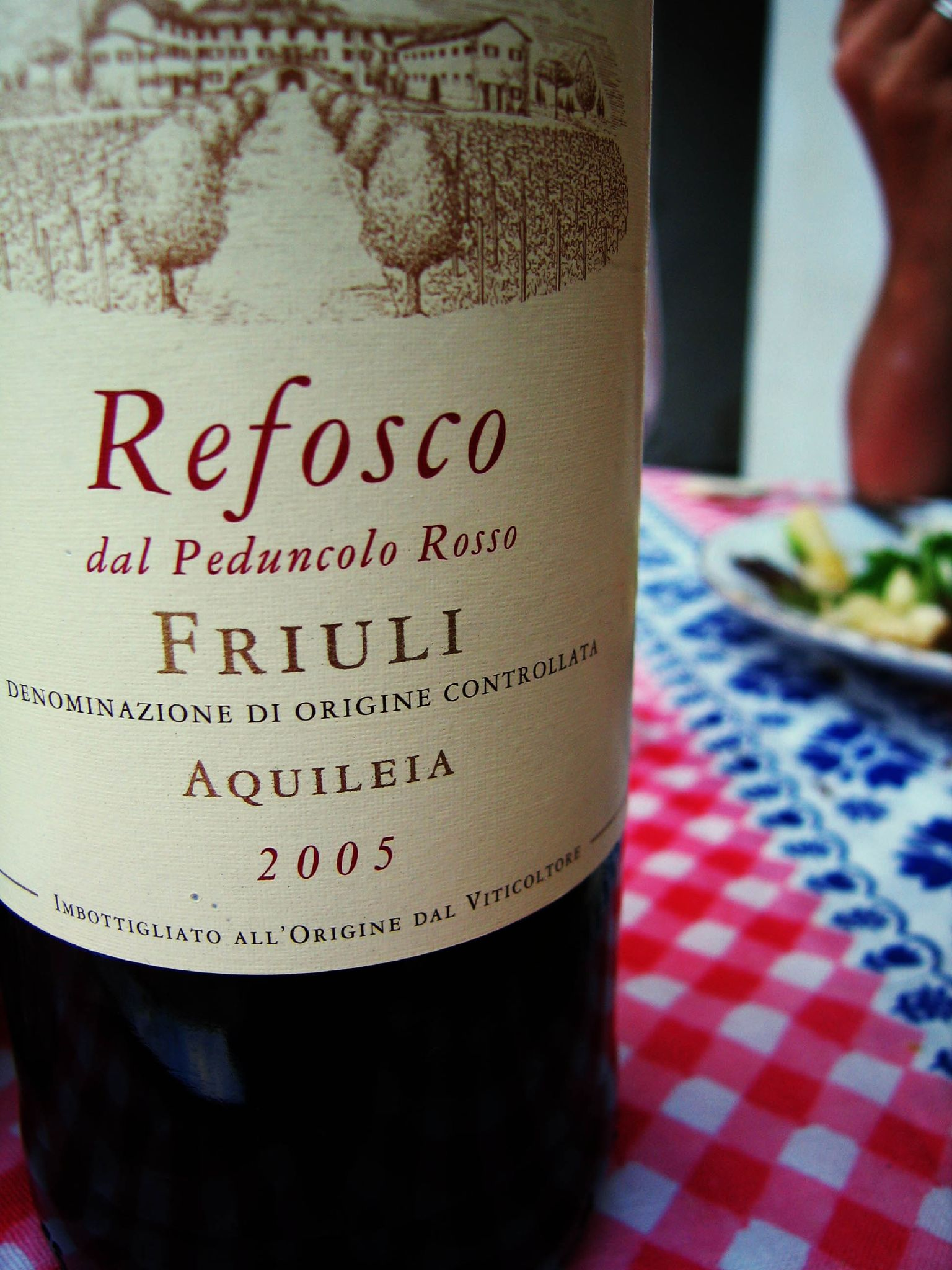
A bottle of Refosco dal Peduncolo Rosso from Friuli Aquileia DOC.

In Friuli, Refosco dal Peduncolo Rosso vines are planted in both hillside and level terrain. Ripening is a concern and the grape requires sufficient access to warmth and sunlight, which play a major role in deciding where to plant the grape. Despite being a slow ripener, the grape does have good resistance to rot that can develop during autumn rains. The deeply colored wine produced from the grape tends to be full-bodied with high acidity levels and flavors of plum & almond notes. Since the renewed interest in the grape of the 1980s, winemakers have experimented with producing more internationally recognizable styles of the grape with techniques like malolactic fermentation and new oak aging to mix results.

== Synonyms ==
Refosco dal Peduncolo Rosso is also known under the synonyms Peteljcice, Refosc dal Pecol Rosso, Refosco, Refosco Nostrano, Refosco Penduncolo Rosso, Rifosc, Rifosco, Teran Crvene, and Teran Crvene Peteljcice.
