= Fabio Asquini =

Italian rural economist and agronomist

Count Fabio Asquini (1726–1818) was an Italian rural economist and agronomist who did much to promote silk culture in Italy. Near the end of his life he lived in the Austrian Empire.

Asquini also pioneered wine making with the Picolit grape in the Friuli region of Italy and sold his wines all over Italy and Europe in green blown-glass bottles. His wines were, after tasting, deemed by the Emperor of Austria, "… finer than any other wine" and served in Rome at the table of the pope.
