= Collio Goriziano =

Italian wine and winemaking region

Coordinates: 45°59′11″N 13°29′33″E

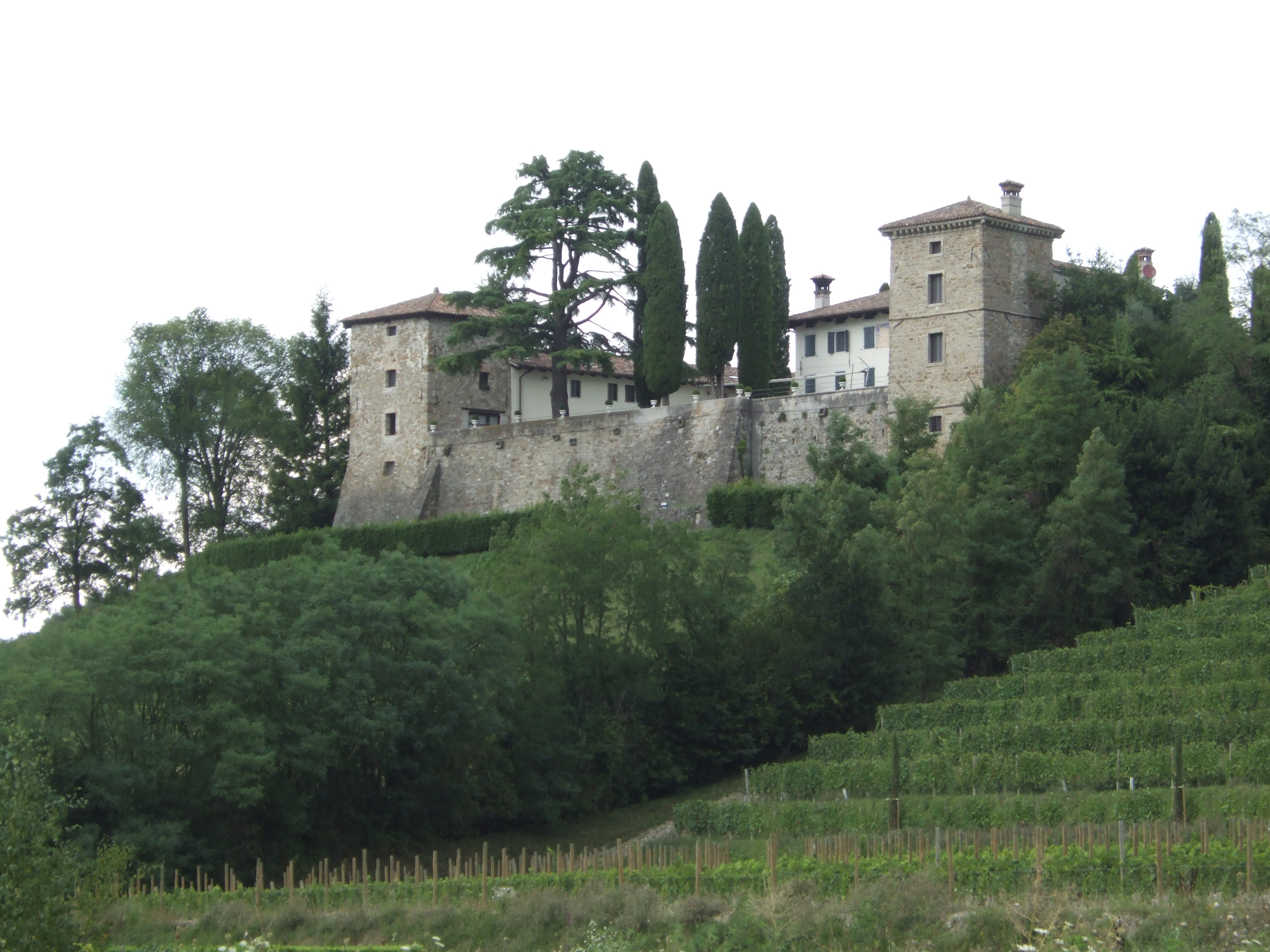

Collio Goriziano (sometimes designated simply as Collio or Collio DOC) is an Italian wine and winemaking region in northeast Italian region of Friuli-Venezia Giulia, located in the northernmost part of the Province of Gorizia, in the Italian part of the Gorizia Hills, which extend to neighboring Slovenia. It has been recognized with the official the status of DOC. Colli Goriziano predominantly produces white wines with Friulano, Ribolla Gialla, Malvasia Istriana, Chardonnay, Pinot bianco, Pinot grigio, and Sauvignon blanc being the leading varietals. Red wine is also produced under the Collio Rosso designation and is usually a blend of Merlot, Cabernet Franc, and Cabernet Sauvignon.

The name "Collio" is taken from the Italian word colli which means hillsides and describes the terrain of the Collio Goriziano region. The Collio extends from the Judrio river in the west, where it borders the Colli Orientali del Friuli DOC, to the Slovenian border on the east. To the south, it is bordered by the Isonzo del Friuli DOC. Most of the region's vineyards are centered on the comune of Cormons. The soil of the region is composed of calcareous marl and flysch sandstone.

The 4th largest DOC in the Friuli-Venezia Giulia in terms of areas planted, it is also the 4th leading producer in terms of volume, trailing the Friuli Grave, Isonzo and Colli Orientali del Friuli region in production. Over 85% of the Collio production is in white wine grape varieties. While still low in comparison to the rest of Italy, the yields in the Collio Goriziano are higher than the 3.5 tons an acre average of the Friuli-Venezia Giulia. In the Collio, the yields average around 4.4 tons/acre (77hectolitres/hectare), though some quality conscious producers have lower yields.

Winemaker Mario Schiopetto was one of the first to incorporate German wine-making techniques, like cold fermentation, to white wine production in the Collio Goriziano. Today, winemaking on the region is very technologically advanced, with refrigerated fermentation tanks, pneumatic winepress, and centrifugal bottling systems. The objective of most Collio Goriziano winemakers is to maximize the fresh fruit and pure varietal characteristic of the grape. To that extent, oak influence is not widely used in this region, though some winemaking are experimenting with its use and different blends of grape varieties to produce more complex wine.
