= Refosco =

Variety of grape

- Grape (Vitis)
- Color of berry skin: Noir
- Species: Vitis vinifera
- Origin: Italy, Slovenia
- VIVC number: 9989

Refosco is a very old family of dark-skinned grape varieties native to the Venetian zone and neighbouring areas of Friuli Venezia Giulia, Gavi, Trentino, Istria, and Karst Plateau. It is considered autochthonous in these regions.

The wines this grape yields can be quite powerful and tannic, with a deep violet color and a slight bitterness. On the palate, there are strong currant, wild berry and plum flavors. The wine can stand some aging (depending on variety), and after a period of four-to-ten years, it achieves a floral quality as well. Refosco should be served at 16 °C (60.8 °F), or if it is particularly rich in tannin, at 18 °C (64.4 °F). It goes best with charcuterie, game, and grilled poultry.

== Varieties ==
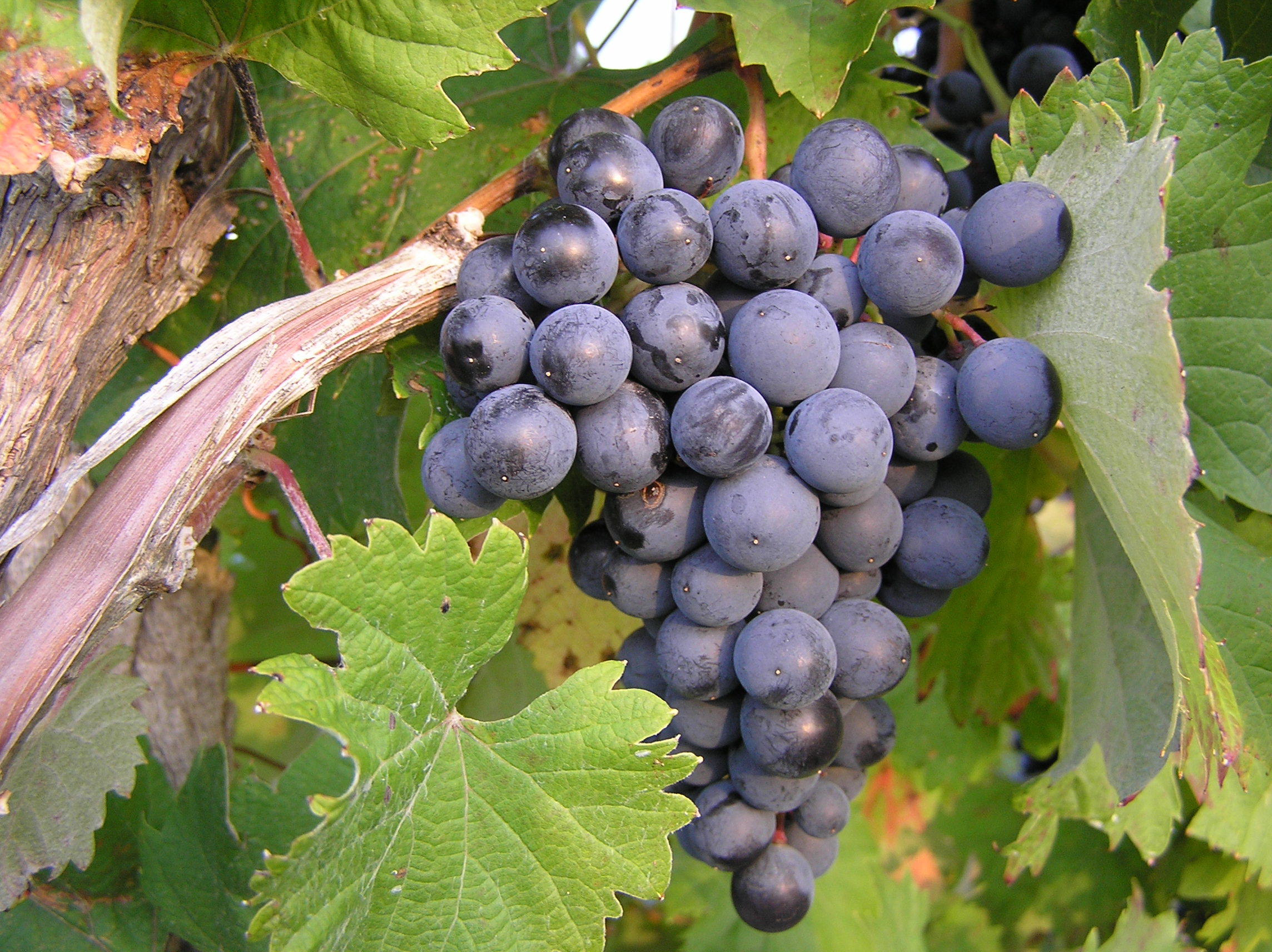
Slovenian refosco grapes

There are several varieties of the refosco family:

- Refosco dal peduncolo rosso - probably the most internationally recognizable refosco wine. Cluster has the red stalk (peduncle), referring to the red stem that holds the grapes to the vine. In the attempt of making the wine more approachable to an international palate, recent versions have taken well to new oak and cold fermentation. The most well known examples of Refosco come from the Colli Orientali region of Friuli.
- Refosco d'Istria (Refosko Istriano or Refosco dal pedunculo verde) - this variety is grown in Slovenian and Croatian parts of Istria, and around Trieste in Italy under the name of Refošk or Refosco d'Istria.
- Teran or Terrano - this refosko variety (and wine) is typical for Carso DOC and Slovenian Karst region under the name Terrano Carso or Kraški teran respectively. It is also grown in Croatian Istria on a very similar red soil under the name Istarski Teran or Teran–Croatian Istria. Some say that Teran is just other refosko varieties grown on Terra Rossa, while others consider it its own variety.
- Refosco di Faedis - a variety cultivated in Faedis region, Torreano di Cividale, Povoletto, Attimis, Nimis in northeast region of Province of Udine. It is very rare and produced in small quantities. It is said to be the parent of all other refosko grapes in the region as it has many characteristics of all other refosco varieties (including high levels of acids and iron typical for Teran)
- Refosco di Rauscedo
- Refosco nostrano
- Refoscone - some say that this is just Refosco di Faedis.
- Refosco di Guarnieri, another name for the Veneto wine grape Trevisana nera.

== Origin and history ==
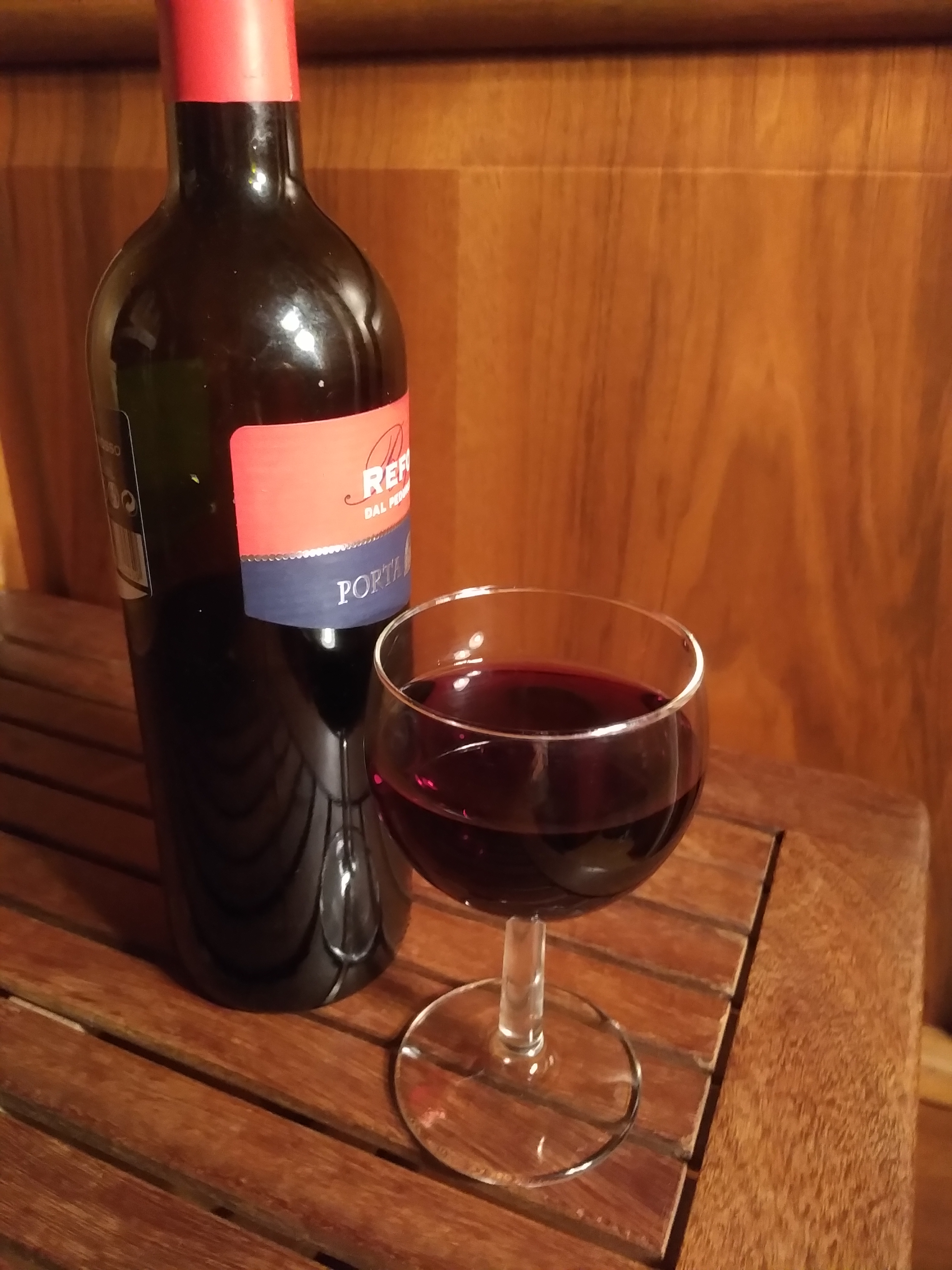
Refosco dal peduncolo rosso (IGT wine "Tre Venezie")

The Refosco family have a very long history, but details of the early history are not clear. DNA analysis of Refosco dal Pedunculo Rosso has revealed a relationship with Marzemino, another ancient variety of northern Italy.

Some authorities have previously suggested that Mondeuse noire, which is primarily found in the Savoy region in eastern France, is identical to Refosco dal Pedunculo Rosso due to the similarity of the wines. DNA analysis has shown that this is not the case, and that the two varieties are unrelated.

Several oenologists believe that wines made from Refosco family grapes are the old Roman puccinum. The grapes were well known in antiquity and a variety of Refosco wine was praised by the Roman writer Pliny the Elder in the first century for its quality. In his work Naturalis Historia he mentioned that puccinum was made of grapes grown in the north Adriatic near the spring of Timavo - a typical Karst river:

... This is the Region of the Carni, joining that of Japides : the River Timavus, and the Castle Pucinum, famous for good Wine. ...
Pliniy, Natural History, CHAPTER XVIII. Venetia, the tenth Region.)

Puccinum was the favorite of Augustus's wife Livia.

There is also a contrary theory that puccinum could be a sweet white prosecco. This theory was supported by Italian Prof. Gianni Dalmasso who claimed that Livia could not like the bitter taste of Refosco wine and that the only possible wine she could like was a sweet variety of prosecco grown in the Trieste region. There is also a comment on the medieval map Prosecho ol:Pucinum, hinc vina a Plinio | tantopere laudata (Prosecho, once called Pucinum. From here comes wine highly praised by Plinius), from Gregorio Amaseo, (1464–1541).

Even the famous Giacomo Casanova liked the Refosco wine, as he describes it in his book of memories:

... His Refosco, which was even better than my devout hostess's had been, made me forget all my troubles. ...:
Giacomo Casanova. History of my life. Volume 1, Chapter 8, p. 207. Translated by Willard R. Trask. JHU Press. 1966

It is believed that one of the reasons the Habsburgs built the Parenzana railway from Trieste to Poreč was because they liked the wines from the region (Refosco, Malvasia and Teran). That is also why the railway was often referred to as a wine railroad or vineyard railway.

== See also ==
- Terrano (grape)
- List of grape varieties
