= Sauvignonasse =

Wine

- Grape (Vitis)
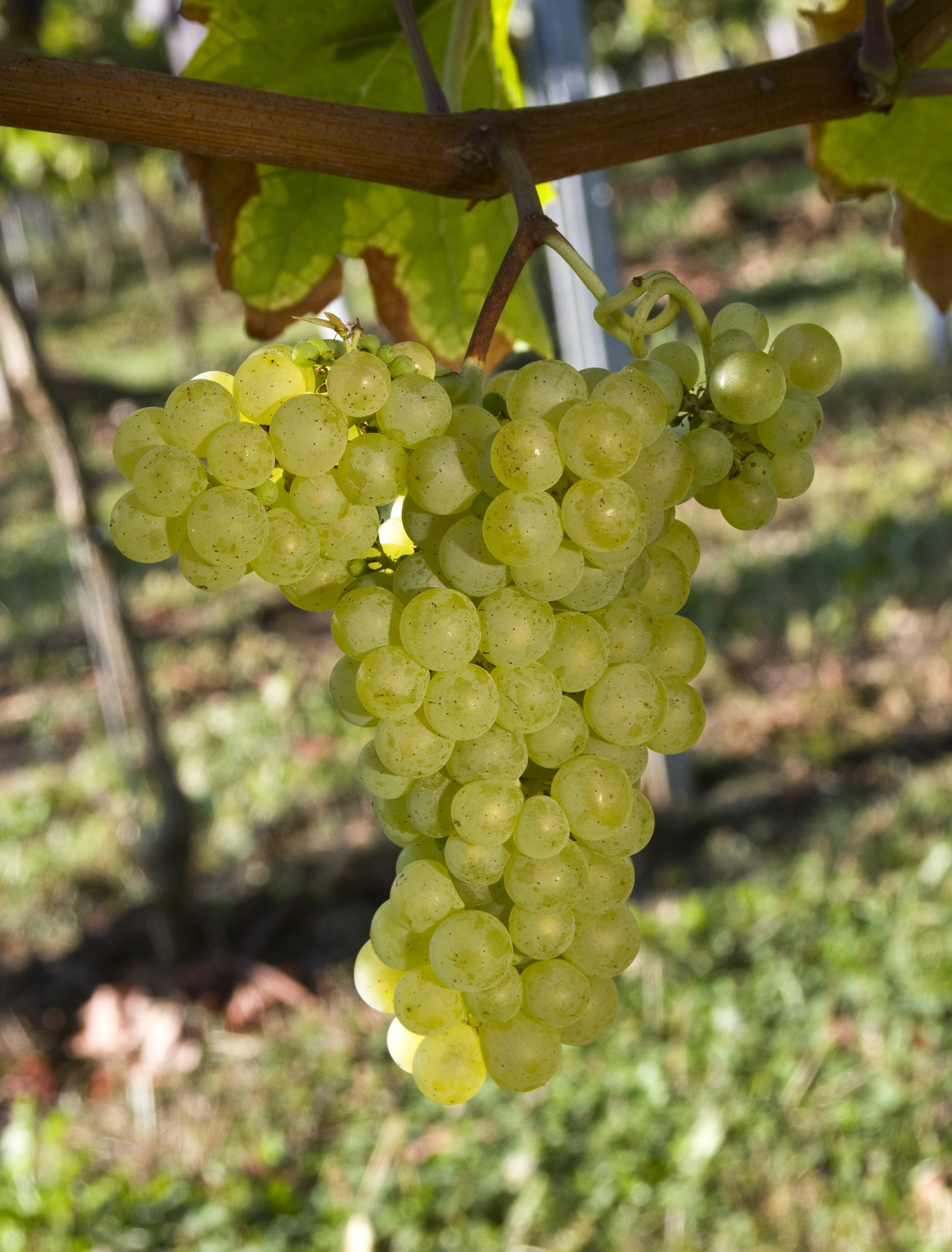
- Species: Vitis vinifera
- Also called: Friulano, Tocai Friulano, Tokaj, Točaj, Sauvignon Vert (more)
- Origin: Italy
- Notable regions: Friuli, Chile, Slovenian Littoral
- VIVC number: 12543

Sauvignonasse (also known as Friulano, Tocai Friulano or Sauvignon Vert) is a white wine grape of the species Vitis vinifera prevalent in the Italian region of Friuli, and adjacent territories of Slovenia. It is widely planted in Chile, where it was historically mistaken for Sauvignon blanc.

Friulano from Friuli-Venezia Giulia was known as "Tocai" Friulano until March 31, 2007, when the European Court of Justice of Luxembourg set the prohibition of using the name "Tocai" in the name of the wine (as stipulated in a 1993 agreement between the European Union and Hungary). Since 2007 wines made from Tocai Friulano have been labeled as Friulano in Friuli.

Despite the fact that the word Tocai is no longer permitted on Italian wine labels, the grape is still officially named Tocai Friulano in Italy's National Catalog of Grape Varieties. In addition, wineries outside of Europe are permitted to label wines made with this grape as Tocai Friulano.

The main confusion in Europe of the name Tocai Friulano is due to the Hungarian wine known as Tokaji (Hungarian of Tokaj), which does not have any Tocai Friulano in it at all, and is composed typically of the following grapes: Furmint (70%), Hárslevelű (20–25%), and Muscat Blanc à Petits Grains (5–10%). Hungary does not want anyone confusing the dry and aromatic Italian Tocai Friulano (which is a unique wine in itself) with their wine called Tokaji. Some believe that early editions of Tocai Friulano in Italy were most likely made of the grape Furmint. The first record of a "new" Tocai, probably made from Sauvignonasse, is documented only in 1932.

The Pinot grigio vine, which is also prevalent in the Friuli-Venezia Giulia region, was once known by the synonym Tokay d'Alsace in Alsace, and may have also been the grape used in some Italian Tokai wines. There is, however, no close genetic link between Tocai Friulano (Sauvignonasse) and Pinot grigio.

== History ==
The grape is believed to have originated in the Veneto region and from there traveled to other Italian regions, especially to the Friuli region, where it was cultivated since 1600. In Italy the grape was historically known as Tocai or Tocai Friulano for centuries. The grape has no known relation to any of the grapes used in the Hungarian wine Tokaji, even though evidence suggests that following the wedding of the Venetian princess Aurora Formentini to the Hungarian Count Batthyány in 1632, some vines of Tocai Friulano were brought with the princess to Hungary. To better distinguish the wines and to protect the Tokaji name, the European Union established regulations prohibiting the use of names too closely associated and easily confused with Tokaji. Winemakers in the Friuli have elected to just refer to the grape as simply Friulano.

The grapes were also planted outside Italy in the Goriška region of Slovenia, especially in the Vipava Valley and Goriška Brda, and was known as "Tokaj". After the European Union prohibition, the Slovenian wine producers have first changed the name of the wine in Sauvignonasse or Zeleni sauvignon (Green Sauvignon). After a few years, in 2013 the name of "Tokaj" was changed to "Jakot", now the official name for the grapes and wine from Slovenia wine regions.

From Italy the grape is believed to have spread to France, where it was transported to Chile as "Sauvignon blanc". Only in the 1990s did ampelographers determine that the Chilean "Sauvignon blanc" was actually Sauvignonasse, which they called Sauvignon vert in Chile. Once the discovery was made, plantings of "true" Sauvignon blanc increased, as Sauvignon vert decreased. While the grape still remains a popular planting in the Friuli-Venezia Giulia and Goriška Brda, it currently has little presence in other parts of the world.

It is unclear why the grape is called Sauvignon vert in Chile; although this has occasionally been used as a synonym in central France, there is a different grape called Sauvignon Vert (or Gros Sauvignon) in the Gironde region that has no known relation to Sauvignonasse. Furthermore, the grape called Sauvignon vert in California is actually Muscadelle, adding additional confusion.

== Confusion with Sauvignon blanc ==
Unlike Sauvignon gris, which is a clonal mutation of Sauvignon blanc also found in Chile, Sauvignonasse (which means "Sauvignon-like") has no known genetic relationship with Sauvignon blanc. The vines were believed to be interspersed together in Bordeaux during the 19th century, when the cuttings were brought to Chile labeled as just "Sauvignon blanc". The leaves and berry clusters of the Sauvignonasse and Sauvignon blanc are very similar, which explains part of the confusion between the two vines. The two vines also have similar susceptibility to Botrytis. The wines made from the two grapes are noticeably different when compared together: Sauvignon blanc being much more aromatic, with notes of ripe fruit like gooseberries and black currant, that Sauvignonasse lacks in favor of softer, floral flavors. Sauvignon blanc also has more acidity than Sauvignonasse and retains much of its vibrancy and flavors longer.

== Viticulture and wine ==
Sauvignonasse is a late budding vine, with high sensitivity to downy mildew and oidium. The vine is prone to producing high yields which must be controlled in order to make premium quality wine. With Sauvignonasse, the quality of the wine depends greatly on the grapes being harvested at the right point. If picked too early, the resulting wine will be dull and lack any varietal character. The grape also has the potential for very high levels of alcohol, with 14.5% ABV not being uncommon.

The wine made from Sauvignonasse varies depending on the area in which it is produced. In the Friuli region, Friuilano and in Goriška Brda region, Jakot wine is typically full bodied, with moderate acidity, floral aromas and delicate fruit flavors. In Chile, Sauvignon vert typically starts with aromas of green apples in its youth that fade as it ages and is more medium bodied.

== Wine regions ==
The grape's most noted homes are in the Friuli-Venezia Giulia and Goriška Brda, where it is one of the regions' most widely planted grape varieties. In the Friuli it is the main white grape of the Denominazione di origine controllata (DOC) zones of Colli Orientali del Friuli, Collio Goriziano, Friuli Grave and Friuli Isonzo, where the grape accounts for more than 20% of those areas' total vineyard plantings. The grape is believed to be related to the Tocai Italico vine, which is planted throughout the Veneto region. The only doubt involves the Tocai Italico plantings around the town of Breganze, which ampelographers believe is a different vine altogether. Argentina, with its close ties to Italian viticulture, also has a small amount of Friulano vines planted.

== Synonyms ==
Over the years, Sauvignonasse has been known under a variety of synonyms: Tocai Friulano, Friulano, Tokaj, Jakot, Sauvignon Vert, Sauvignon de la Corrèze and Sauvignon à Gros Grains.

== See also ==
Carménère – another Chilean wine grape with a similar story to Sauvignon vert
