= Colli Orientali del Friuli =

Italian controlled wine origin in Friuli-Venezia Giulia

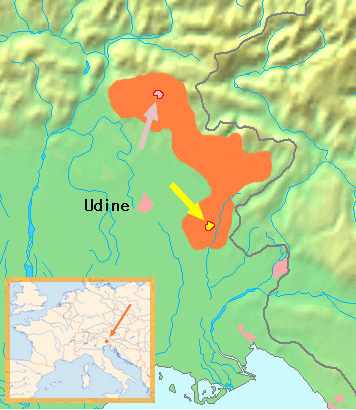
Map of Colli Orientali del Friuli

The Colli Orientali del Friuli is a Denominazione di origine controllata (DOC) located in the Italian wine region of Friuli-Venezia Giulia. The region is located in the province of Udine and is sub-divided into three main sections; Ramandolo in the north, Cialla and Corno di Rosazzo. The climate and soil is very similar to the neighboring DOC of Collio Goriziano and the two region share many winemaking similarities as well. The main distinction between the Colli Orientali del Friuli and Collio Goriziano lie in the increased red and dessert wine production of the Colli Orientali del Friuli. The region also includes within its boundaries the three Denominazione di origine controllata e garantita (DOCG) of the Friuli-Venezia Giulia Ramandolo and the two passito wine DOCGs of Colli Orientali del Friuli Picolit and Colli Orientali del Friuli Picolit-Cialla.

== History ==
Viticulture has existed in the area since the time of the Romans. In 1866, during the Risorgimento, the region was united with Italy. In the 1970s, the white wines of the region began to receive international attention due to innovations in winemaking techniques that produced fresher, more vibrant white wines. In the 1980s, winemakers in the Colli Orientali del Friuli focused on increasing the quality of their red wine production. Following in the footsteps of the "Super Tuscan" producers, Friuli winemakers decided to produce red wines outside of DOC regulations, under the vino da tavola designation. Fuller bodied white wines, made from Chardonnay and Pinot bianco fermented in oak, were also sold under vino da tavola, to distinguish them from the crisp, lighter white wines that Colli Orientali del Friuli is typically associated with.

== Grapes and wine ==
The white wine production of the Colli Orientali del Friuli is dominated by the Friulano grape, which accounts for nearly a third of the region's vineyard plantings. Other important white wine varieties include Sauvignon blanc, Pinot grigio, Verduzzo, Pinot bianco and Ribolla Gialla. The Picolit grape is the primary grape for sweet wines and is the main grape behind two of the regions DOCGs. Red wines account for around 35% of the region's entire production and is centered on the towns of Buttrio, Cividale del Friuli and Manzano, Friuli. Merlot is the leading red wine variety, followed by Cabernet Sauvignon, Pinot noir, Pignolo, Refosco, Refosco dal Peduncolo Rosso and Schioppettino.

== Other DOCs and DOCGs ==
In addition to the main Colli Orientali del Friuli DOC, there are two smaller DOCs centered on the sub-regions of Cialla and Corno di Rosazzo. The Colli Orientali del Friuli Cialla DOC is noted for its dry white wines and produces sweet and off dry wines from the Picolit and Verduzzo grapes. Dry red wines are produced in this region from the Refosco dal Peduncolo Rosso and Schioppettino grapes. The Colli Orientali del Friuli Rosazzo DOC of Corno di Rosazzo is noted for its significant plantings of Ribolla Gialla, which is believed to have originated in the region in the vineyard of the local abbey over 1,000 years ago. Sweet wines made from the Picolit and dry wines from the Pignolo grapes are also common in this region. The dessert wines from the Picolit grape made in the passito style has two DOCG regions in the Colli Orientali del Friuli; the Colli Orientali del Friuli Picolit-Cialla DOCG is centered on the commune of Cialla, while the Colli Orientali del Friuli Picolit DOCG encompasses most of the region.
