= Pignolo (grape) =

Variety of grape

Pignolo (Italian: [piɲˈɲɔːlo]) is a red Italian wine grape grown predominantly in the Friuli Venezia Giulia region of northeast Italy. Believed to have been cultivated in the hills of Rosazzo, the grape is now a prominent variety in the Colli Orientali del Friuli Denominazione di origine controllata (DOC). In Italian the grape's name originates from pigna (pine cone), because the grapes are dense like pine cones. The first recorded mention of the grape was in Abbot Giobatta Michieli's late 17th century book Bacchus in Friuli in which he described the grape making "excellent black wine". Today the grape is used to make rich, deep colored, full bodied wine that does well with some time in oak. Well made examples of the wine have good balance between the grape's acidity and tannins with flavor notes of plum and blackberry. Most experts believe that it is not related to the Lombardy Pignola grape of the Valtellina region.
