= Vini Lunardelli =

Italian winery

Coordinates: 46°03′05.6″N 13°08′47.6″E

Vini Lunardelli (formally Alessandro Lunardelli) is a winery in the Italian region of Friuli-Venezia Giulia, notorious for selling wine bottles featuring an image of Adolf Hitler and Nazi slogans, and bottles with an image of Stalin and communist slogans, but the trademark's owner decided to stop this form of marketing from 2023.

== History ==
It was founded in Pasian di Prato in 1968 by Alessandro Lunardelli, who came from a Veneto family with wine industry traditions. Initially, the winery sold its wine in bulk, but has been selling its own bottlings since 1990. In 1987, Alessandro's son Andrea Lunardelli joined the company, and has been in charge of Vini Lunardelli's marketing, which has been successful but have sparked significant controversy.

Annual production is around 100,000 bottles, and include several different white and red varieties produced in different DOC areas within Friuli-Venezia Giulia.

== Controversial labels ==
In 1995 Vini Lunardelli started to sell bottles with pictures of historical personalities, including highly controversial persons, under the name "Historical line" (Linea della storia). Many of their labels seem to be taken from historical posters and sometimes include propaganda slogans. The around 60 different labels are not tied to specific wines, but can be bought on any of Vini Lunardelli's wine bottles. Separate collection of motifs of the "Historical line" include:

- Il ventennio, featuring pictures of Benito Mussolini.
- Communist Collection, with Che Guevara, Joseph Stalin, Josip Broz Tito, Karl Marx and others.
- Der Führer, with pictures of Adolf Hitler, Eva Braun, Rudolf Hess, Hermann Göring and others, some of them including Nazi slogans.
- Miscellaneous other images, such as Napoleon I of France and Winston Churchill.

Especially the Hitler labels, and to some extent the Mussolini labels, have been the subject of outrage and accusations of spreading fascist propaganda, especially from Germany, where the use of such images and slogans is strictly regulated. However, the historical line seems also to have been a commercial success for Vini Lunardelli, which claims to sell around 50% of their production with labels from this line.

In September 2007, 20,000 of Vini Lunardelli's bottles bearing labels from "Der Führer" line were confiscated by the Italian police, but were returned in October 2007 after a court decision.
