= Picolit =

Variety of grape

- Grape (Vitis)
- Color of berry skin: Blanc
- Species: Vitis vinifera
- Also called: see list of synonyms
- Origin: Italy
- Notable regions: Friuli-Venezia Giulia
- Notable wines: Colli Orientali del Friuli
- VIVC number: 9236

Picolit (also known as Piccolit and Piccolito) is a white Italian wine grape grown in the Friuli-Venezia Giulia region of northeast Italy. The grape is allowed in the Denominazione di origine controllata e garantita (DOCG) wines of Colli Orientali del Friuli. The grape is most commonly associated with sweet dessert wines often made in the passito style. Historically planted in poor and infertile vineyards, the grape gets its name from the very small stalk, which in friulian language is called pecolèt or pecolùt. The grape had a worldwide reputation in the 18th century when it was featured in royal courts from Great Britain to the Russian Empire. While experiencing cult wine popularity in the 1960s & 1970s, Picolit's extremely small yields have made it economically difficult to grow and has limited the number of plantings.

It was assumed to be identical with the Hungarian grape variety Kéknyelű. But in 2006 isoenzymes and microsatellite analyses have confirmed that these two cultivars are different.

== History ==
While the exact origins of the grape are not clear, Picolit was well known internationally during the 18th century as a favorite of Count Fabio Asquini. The Count oversaw production of more than 100,000 bottles that was exported to the royal courts of the Holy Roman Empire, Great Britain, France, the Netherlands, Russia, Saxony and Tuscany as well as the Vatican. Asquini was a pioneer who left diligent notes on his growing and winemaking methods to coax the most out of the limited resources that the Picolit vine produces, but the difficulty in growing the vine led to a sharp decline in plantings. The Perusini family invested many resources during the 20th century to develop new clones that would be easier to cultivate but still retain the desirable characteristics of the grape. While a brief spike in popularity in the 1960s & 1970s did elevate the Picolit wine to cult wine status, the work of the Perusini family is credited with keeping the grape from extinction. The popularity of Picolit wine has led to the illegal practice of blending it with inferior quality Verduzzo to stretch the supply.

== Wine styles ==
The Picolit grape balance of acidity and sugar lends itself well to dessert wine production. Both late harvest and passito styles are made. With passito wines, the Picolit grapes are normally harvested in mid-October and then dried to raisins on straw mats before pressing. The late harvest styles are picked several weeks later, just before the grapes raisin on the vine. After fermentation, the wine is aged-often in oak barrels. In addition to being served after dinner, the wine is also considered a vino da meditazione or apéritif that can be served alone. Picolit wines tend to be characterized by soft floral aromas with peach and apricot flavors.

== Synonyms ==
Picolit is also known under the synonyms Balafan, Balafant, Blaustengler, Blaustingl Weiss, Kel'ner, Peccoleto Bianco, Piccolet, Piccoletta, Piccolit, Piccoliti Bianco, Piccolito, Piccolito Bianco, Piccolito del Friuli, Piccolitt, Piccolitto, Piccolitto Friulano, Picoleto Bianco, Piculit, Pikolit, Pikolit Weiss, Piros Keknyelü, Ranful Weiss, Szabo Istvan, Szod Bajor, Uva del Friuli, Weisser Blaustingl, Weisser Ranful, and Wisellertraube Weiss, but none of these is present in Friuli and Italy, except "Picolit" which is the only guaranteed and protected name.
