= Vitovska =

Variety of grape

Vitovska or Vitouska, also known in Slovene as Vitovska Grganja or Garganja, is an Italian and Slovene wine grape predominantly planted in the Friuli-Venezia Giulia region and the Karst Plateau in the Slovenian Littoral. The name vitovska is of Slovene origin, from Vitovlje, and grganja is of Friulian origin, from gargànie (nere). The grape is now mostly found in the lower Isonzo and Carso regions of northeast Italy. The grape produces a dry white wine.

Vitovska is a cross between Prosecco Tondo and Malvasia Bianca Lunga.
