= Trevisana nera =

Variety of grape

Trevisana nera is a red Italian wine grape variety that is grown in the Veneto region of northeast Italy. While ampelographers believe that the name Trevisana suggest that the grape originated in the province of Treviso, today the grape is almost exclusively found in the northern province of Belluno, particularly around the comune of Feltre, where the grape is a permitted variety in the Indicazione geografica tipica (IGT) zone of Vigneti delle Dolomiti.

== History ==
The Belluno province, in the Veneto, region where Trevisana nera is grown

The history of Trevisana nera is relatively recent with the grape's first documented appearance in viticultural documents dating to mid-20th century. While the grape has almost exclusively been found in the province of Belluno, ampelographers believe that the name Trevisana suggest an origin in the more southern Venetian province of Treviso, though DNA profiling has so far not shown any relationship between Trevisana and any other grapes from Treviso.

From 2003 to 2008, DNA analysis showed that the Gattera and Borgogna grapes from the commune of Castelcucco in the province of Treviso and the Refosco di Guarnieri grape from the Friuli-Venezia Giulia wine region were identical to Trevisana nera.

== Viticulture ==
Trevisana nera is mid to late ripening grapevine that can be very vigorous and high yielding if not kept in check by winter pruning and later leaf pulling and green harvesting during the growing season.

== Wine regions ==
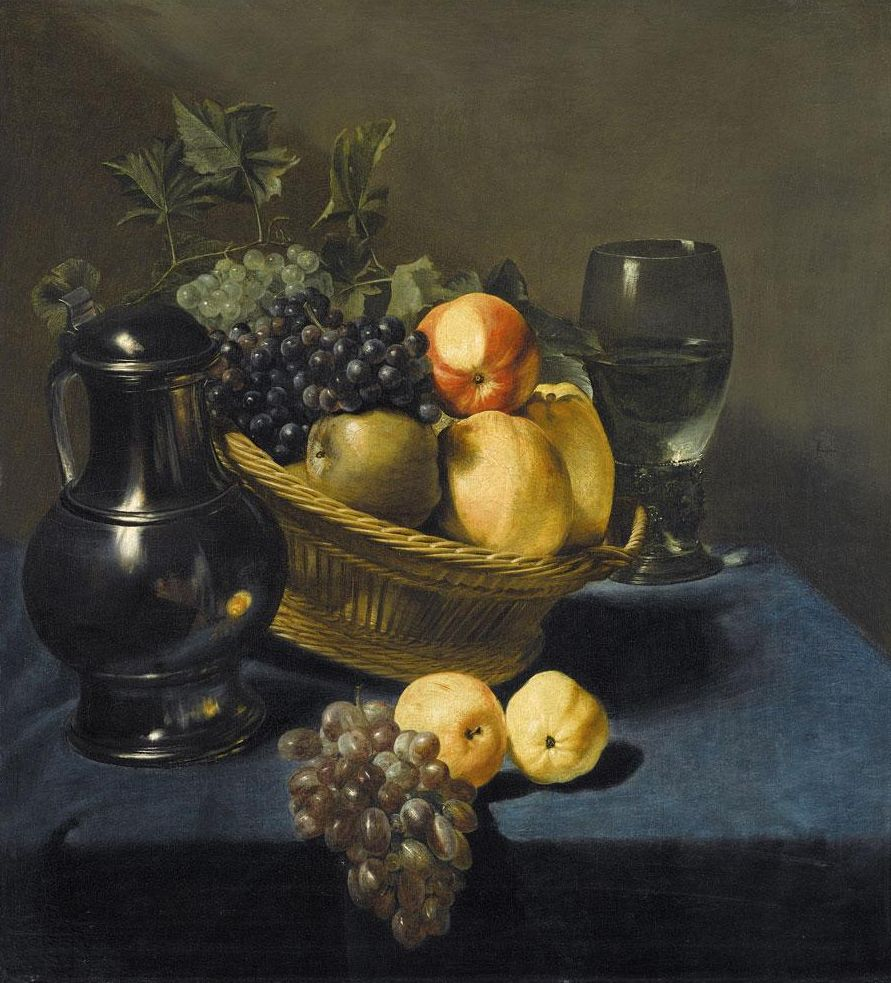
While Trevisana nera can be used for wine grape production, in the Friuli-Venezia Giulia it is often used as a table or eating grape.

In 2000, there were 37 hectares (91 acres)of Trevisana nera planted almost exclusively around the commune of Feltre, in the province of Belluno, located between the province of Udine to the east, in the Friuli-Venezia Giulia, and the province of Trentino, in the Trentino-Alto Adige/Südtirol, to the northwest. Outside of Feltre, there are some limited plantings of the grape around the commune of Castelcucco, in Treviso, where the grape is known as Borgogna and Gattera, and in the Friuli-Venezia Giulia, where the grape is known as Refosco di Guarnieri and is mainly used as a table grape variety.

== Synonyms ==
Over the years, Trevisana nera has been known under a variety of synonyms, including: Borgogna (in the province of Treviso), Gattera and Refosco di Guarnieri (in the province of Friuli).
