= Typicity =

Typicity (French typicité, Italian tipicità) is a term in wine tasting used to describe the degree to which a wine reflects its varietal origins and thus demonstrates the signature characteristics of the grape from which it was produced, e.g., how much a Merlot wine “tastes like a Merlot”. It is an important component in judging wine competition when wines of the same variety are judged against each other.

In some countries, such as Austria, typicity is used as part of a qualitative hierarchy that takes into consideration soil, climate and vintage. A similar concept to the French terroir, though slightly less controversial, Austrian Qualitätswein (literally "quality wine") is tested for typicity with the classification printed on the wine label.

As a concept, typicity relies on both historical precedent and a sentiment of what the present-day majority view how a certain variety should “taste”. This can be considered a subjective and unreliable way to measure wine, opening the door to elitism with what has been criticized by some, such as Sean Thackrey, viticultural racism.
