= Terrano (grape) =

Variety of grape

- Grape (Vitis)
- Color of berry skin: Noir
- Species: Vitis vinifera
- Also called: Teran and other synonyms
- Origin: Member of the Refosco family. Believed to have originated in Italy.

Terrano (Slovene: Teran) is a Slovenian and Italian wine variety (not to be confused with a completely different grape variety also called Teran, which is indigenous to the Croatian part of the Istrian peninsula), bearing the mark of recognized traditional denomination. It is a member of the Refosco family of grape varieties, which also includes Refosco dal Peduncolo Rosso. Since 2006 it is a wine with a protected designation of origin (PDO) within European Union under the protected designation "Teran".

Traditional Slovene Kraški teran does not age well—notably, chemical analyses have confirmed that the content of bivalent iron starts to diminish radically two years after fermentation—and should be consumed within its first year. After that, the wine quickly loses its attractive vitality and can even become bitter and flat.

== Regions ==
Terrano wine is primarily grown on the Karst Plateau within the Slovene Littoral wine region (where it is called Kraški teran 'Karst Terrano') and Italian Carso DOC (with two main varieties called Terrano del Carso 'Karst Terrano' and Carso Rosso 'Karst Red'). Terrano is the principal red wine grape in these regions. In the Carso DOC, the grape is sometimes blended with Piccola nera. In Italy it is also used in the DOC Cagnina di Romagna in Emilia-Romagna.

The Italian and Slovene parts of the Karst Plateau (Carso and Kras, respectively) are located on either side of the Italian–Slovene border. In this area the Terra Rossa is present in part of the municipalities of Sežana, Komen and Kostanjevica, around the villages of Tomaj and Dutovlje. In Italy, it is present in the area of Monrupino, Sgonico, Duino-Aurisina and in a very limited part of the municipality of Trieste (between Opicina and the Slovenian border). In Croatia, it is found in Western Istria.

== History, properties and food matching ==
Roman naturalist Pliny the Elder wrote that puccinum was the favorite of Augustus's wife Livia.

Kraški teran is traditionally well paired together with pršut (prosciutto or dry-cured ham). However, it matches also with other pork dishes, sausages, pancetta or cooked ham with horseradish (traditional foods of the Karst Plateau and Istria). Kraski teran should be served at 15–16 °C (59–61 °F).

== Synonyms ==
Indigenous Terrano wine is produced exclusively from Terrano grapes, a wine under the same name is made of Refosco grapes grown on Terra Rossa, which is the Slovenian-produced Kraški teran, therefore it is often a misnomer when different synonyms may be used: Cagnina (in Emilia-Romagna), Crodarina, Gallizio, Gallizza, Istranin, Istranyun, Istrianka, Istrijanac, Istrijanka, Magnacan, Refosco, Refosca, Refosco D'Istria, Refosco del Carso, Refosco Magnacan, Refoscone, Refošk, Refošk Istarski and Rifosco.
