= Reichenau, Carinthia =

Municipality in Austria

Reichenau
- Municipality
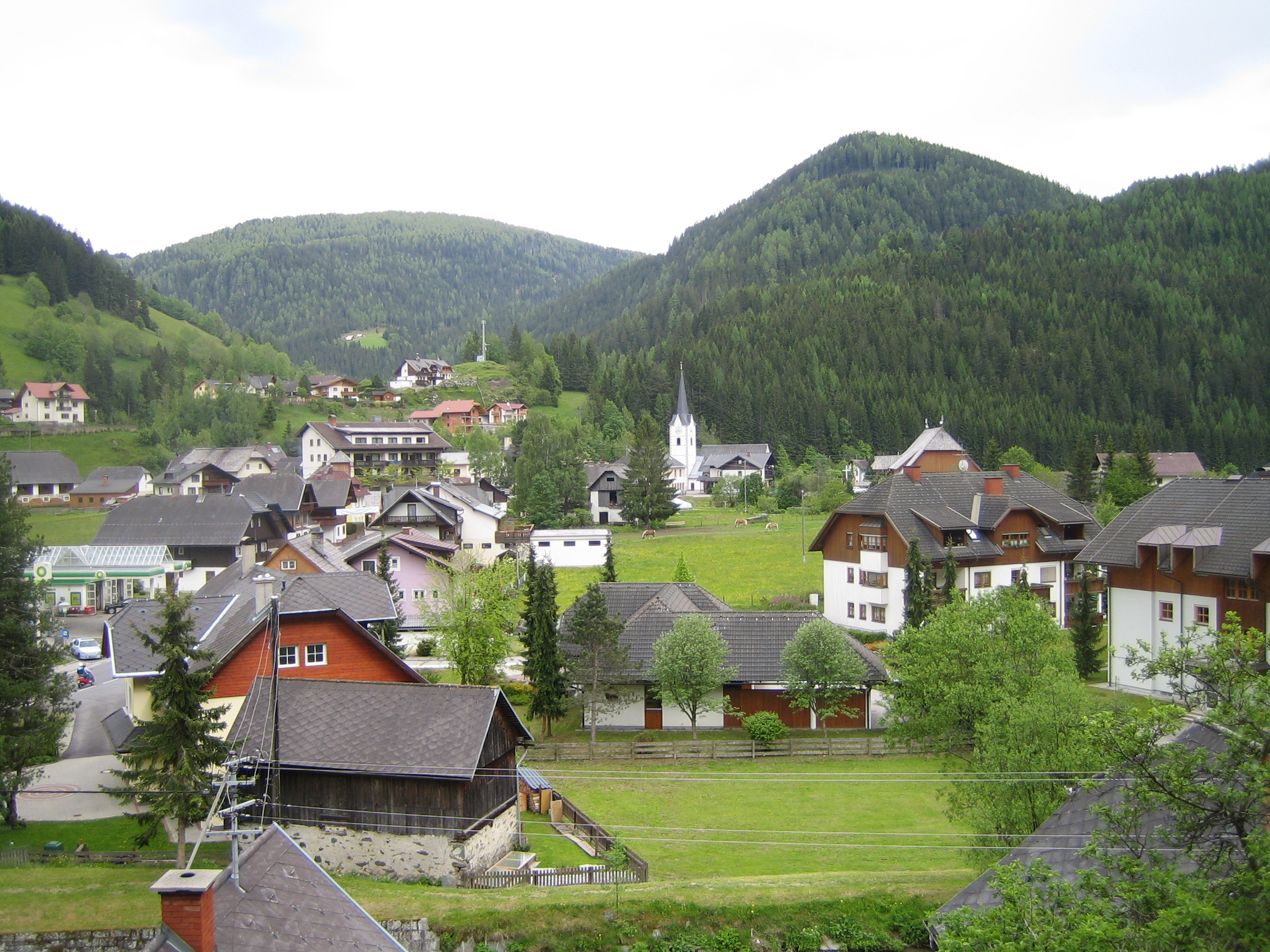
- Ebene Reichenau with St Martin Church

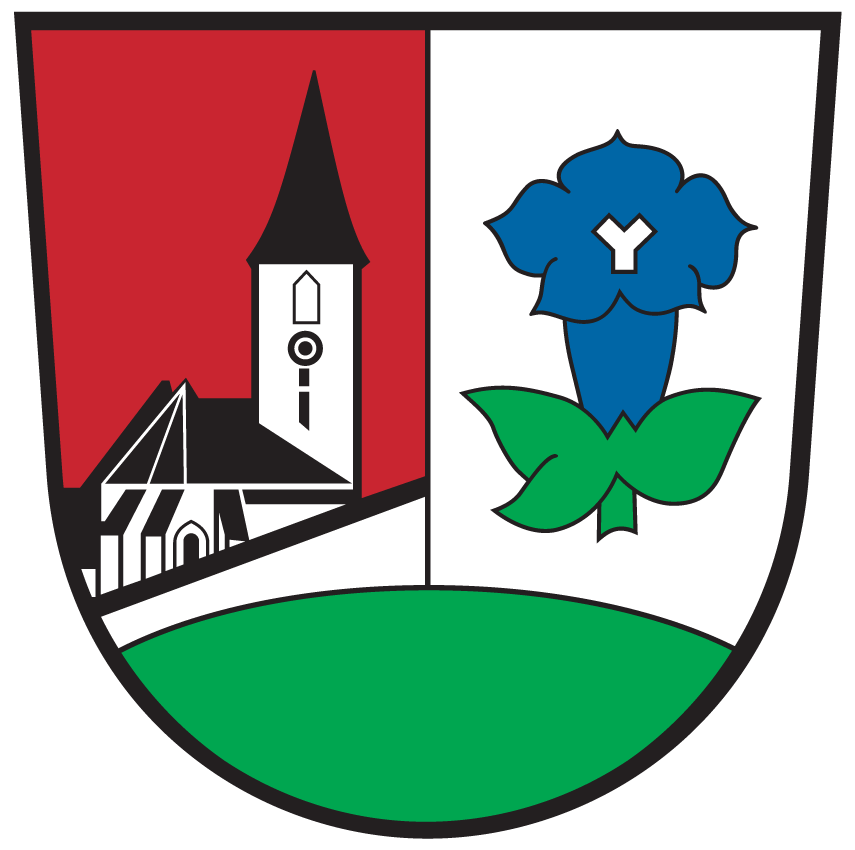
- Coat of arms

- Location within Austria
- Coordinates: 46°51′N 13°55′E
- Country: Austria
- State: Carinthia
- District: Feldkirchen

Government
  - Mayor: Karl Lessiak (SPÖ)

Area
  - Total: 113.99 km^{2} (44.01 sq mi)
- Elevation: 1,095 m (3,593 ft)

Population (2018-01-01)
  - Total: 1,822
  - Density: 15.98/km^{2} (41.40/sq mi)
- Time zone: UTC+1 (CET)
  - Summer (DST): UTC+2 (CEST)
- Postal code: 9564, 9565
- Website: reichenau.gv.at

Reichenau (Austrian German pronunciation: [ˈraɪçənaʊ]; Slovene: Rajnava) is a municipality in the district of Feldkirchen in the Austrian state of Carinthia.

== Geography ==
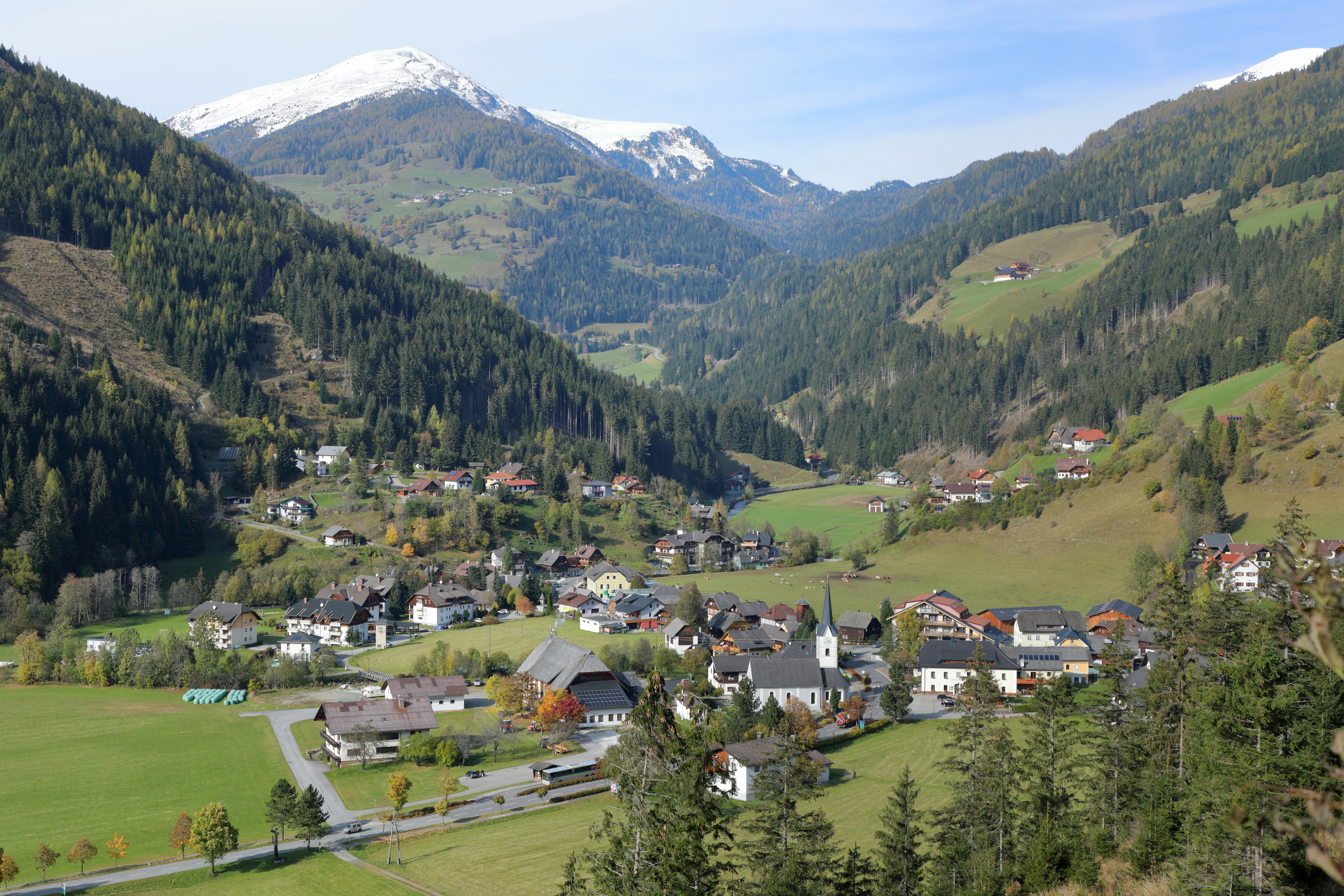
South-southeast view of Reichenau

The municipal area is situated in the upper valley of the Gurk River within the Nock Mountains range (part of the Gurktal Alps). In the north, the road from Feldkirchen leads up to Turracher Höhe Pass and Turracher See at a height of 1,763 m (5,784 ft) AA on the border with Predlitz-Turrach in Styria and further down into the Mur Valley. Another small mountain lake is Falkertsee at 1,872 m (6,142 ft) in the west. Reichenau is the eastern terminus of the Nockalmstraße scenic route through the Nock Mountains to Krems.

Reichenau consists of the cadastral communities Ebene Reichenau, Sankt Lorenzen, Sankt Margarethen, Wiedweg, and Winkl.

=== Neighboring municipalities ===
	Predlitz-Turrach
Bad Kleinkirchheim		Albeck, Carinthia
Feld am See; Afritz am See	Arriach	Gnesau

== History ==
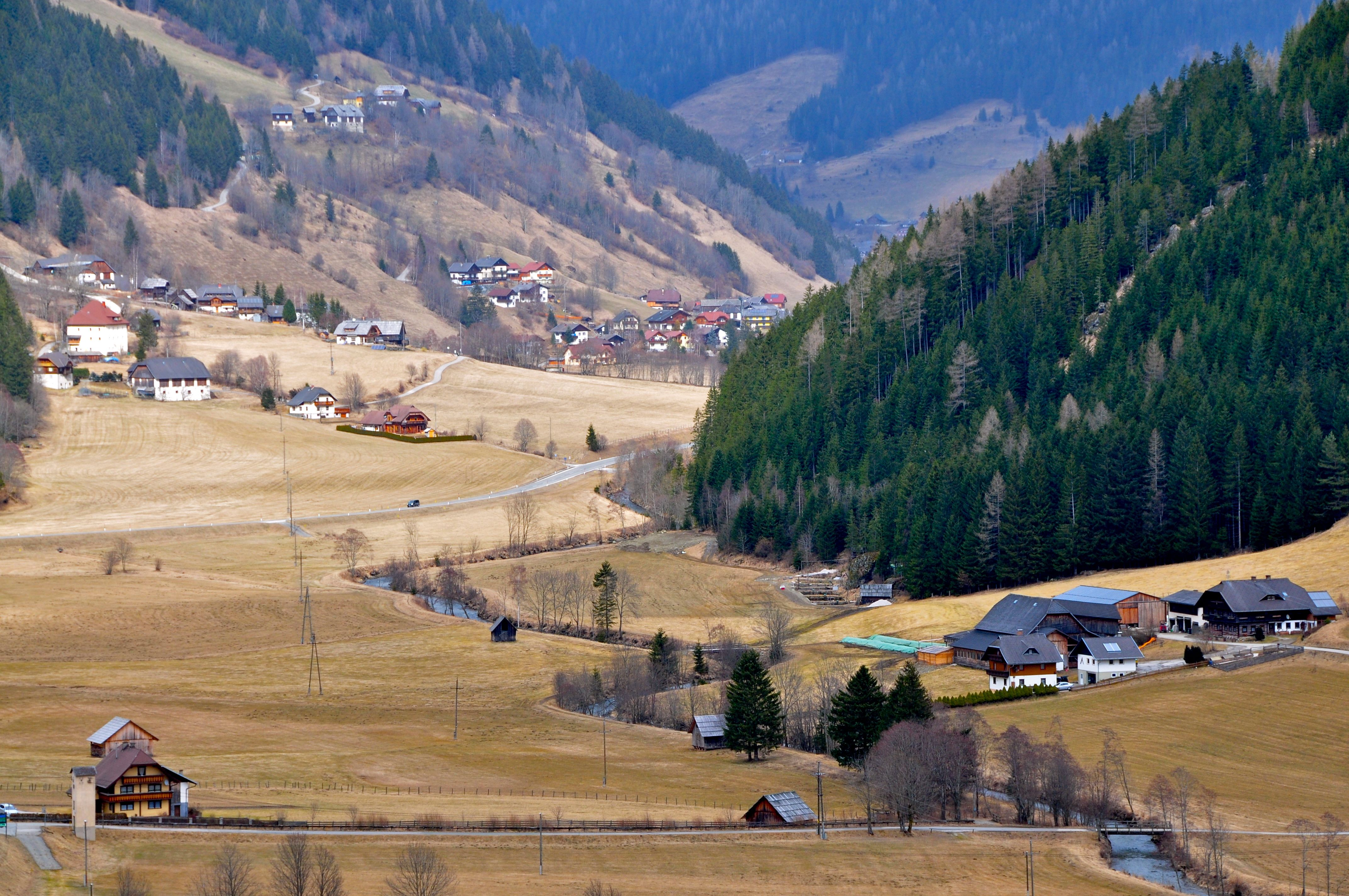
Farmsteads in Gurk Valley

The remote and densely forested area of the upper Gurk Valley was settled by Celtic colonists when the region was part of the Noricum kingdom, which in 15 BC was incorporated as a province of the Roman Empire. From about 590 Alpine Slavs immigrated into the lower parts of the valley, followed by Bavarian settlers in the 10th century.

In the High Middle Ages, when the area was part of the Duchy of Carinthia, the valley belonged to the estates of Millstatt Abbey. From about 1300 the Benedictine monks had large parts of the woodland cleared. The village of Reichenau (possibly derived from German: Rauch, "smoke" referring to slash-and-burn agriculture) was first mentioned in a 1332 deed. A chapel in the neighbouring village of Sankt Lorenzen at a height of 1,477 m (4,846 ft) (today the highest situated parish church in Carinthia) was already documented in 1216.

A Protestant prayer house (Toleranzbethaus) in Wiedweg was first mentioned in 1787. About 16% of the local population confess to the Protestant Church.

== Politics ==
Seats in the municipal assembly (Gemeinderat) as of 2009 elections:

- Freedom Party of Austria (FPÖ): 9
- Social Democratic Party of Austria (SPÖ): 7
- Austrian People's Party (ÖVP): 3

=== Twin towns — sister cities ===
Reichenau is twinned with:

- Nersingen, Germany, since 2009

== Notable people ==
- Siegfried Grabner (born 1975), snowboarder

== Gallery ==
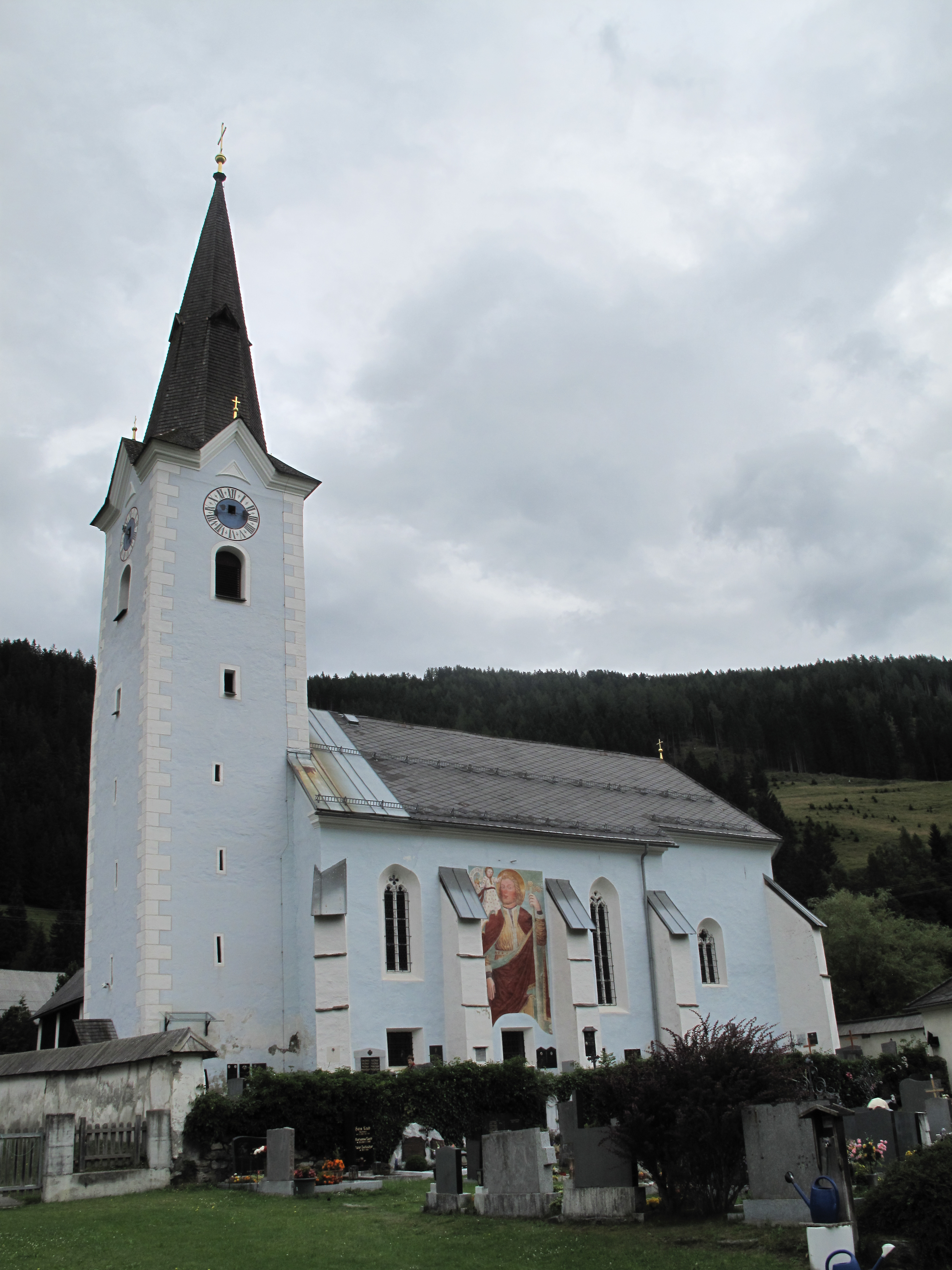
Sankt Margarethen, church

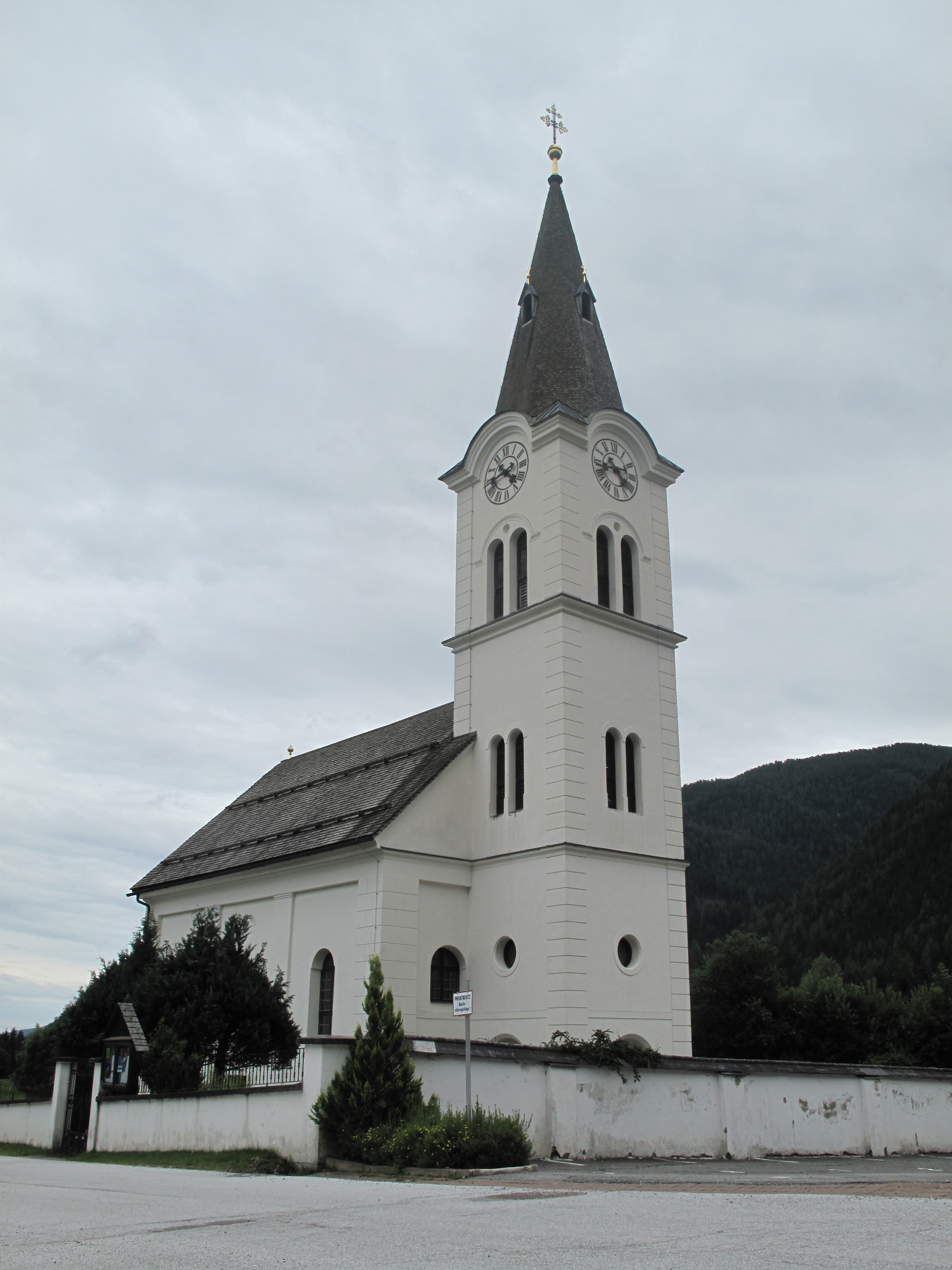
Wiedweg, church
