= Turracher See =

Turracher See Lake Turrach
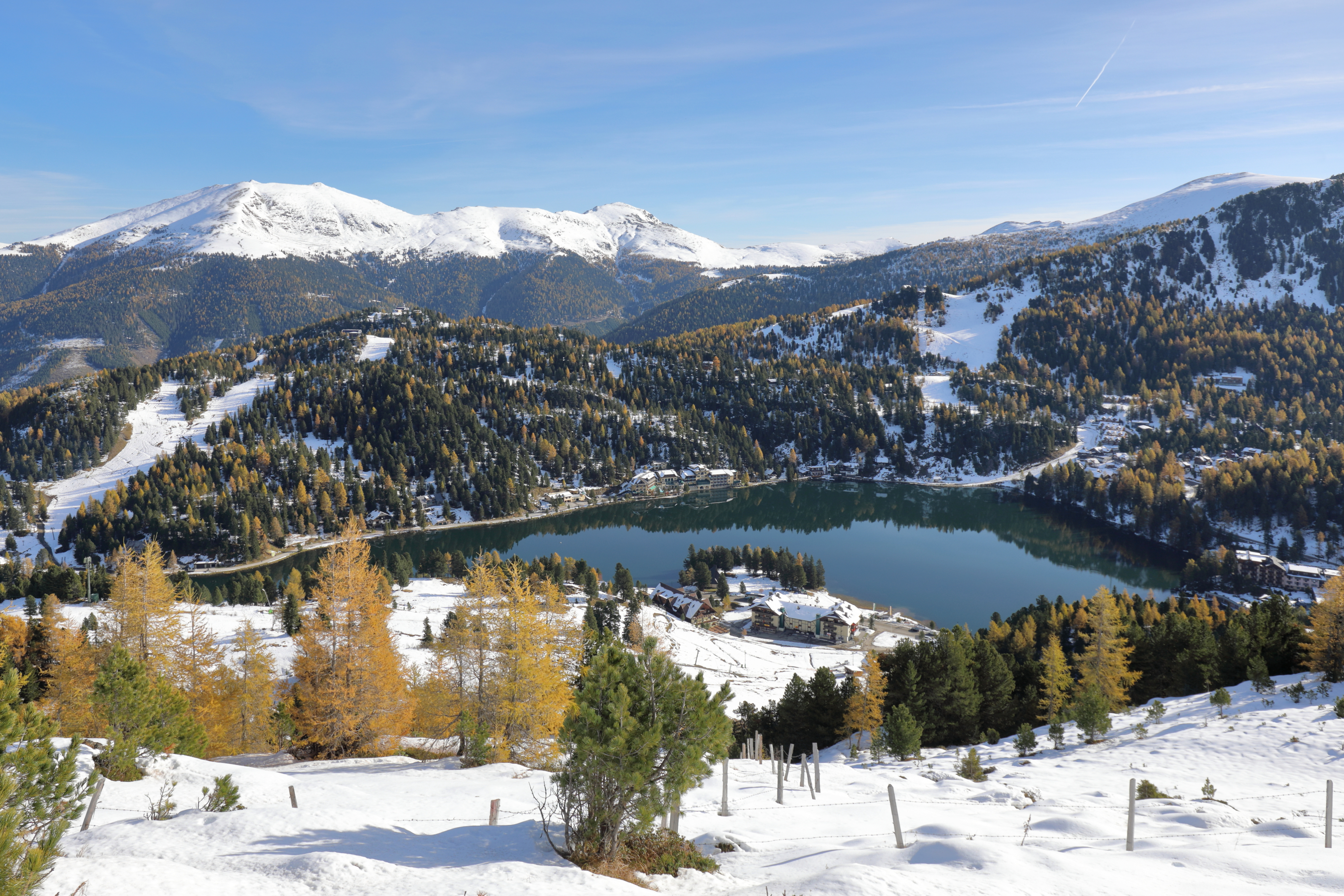
- Autumn view of the Turracher See

- Location within Kärnten
- Location: Carinthia, Styria
- Coordinates: 46°55′8″N 13°52′35″E
- Type: Alpine lake
- Primary outflows: Seebach to Turrach and Mur river
- Catchment area: 2.2 km^{2} (0.85 sq mi)
- Basin countries: Austria
- Surface area: 0.19 km^{2} (0.073 sq mi)
- Average depth: 13.6 m (45 ft)
- Max. depth: 33 m (108 ft)
- Water volume: 2,644,477 m^{3} (2,143.912 acre⋅ft)
- Residence time: 1.1 years
- Surface elevation: 1,763 m (5,784 ft)
- Settlements: Predlitz-Turrach, Reichenau

Lake Turrach (German: Turracher See) is an Alpine lake at Turracher Höhe Pass, on the state border of Carinthia and Styria in Austria.

== Geography ==
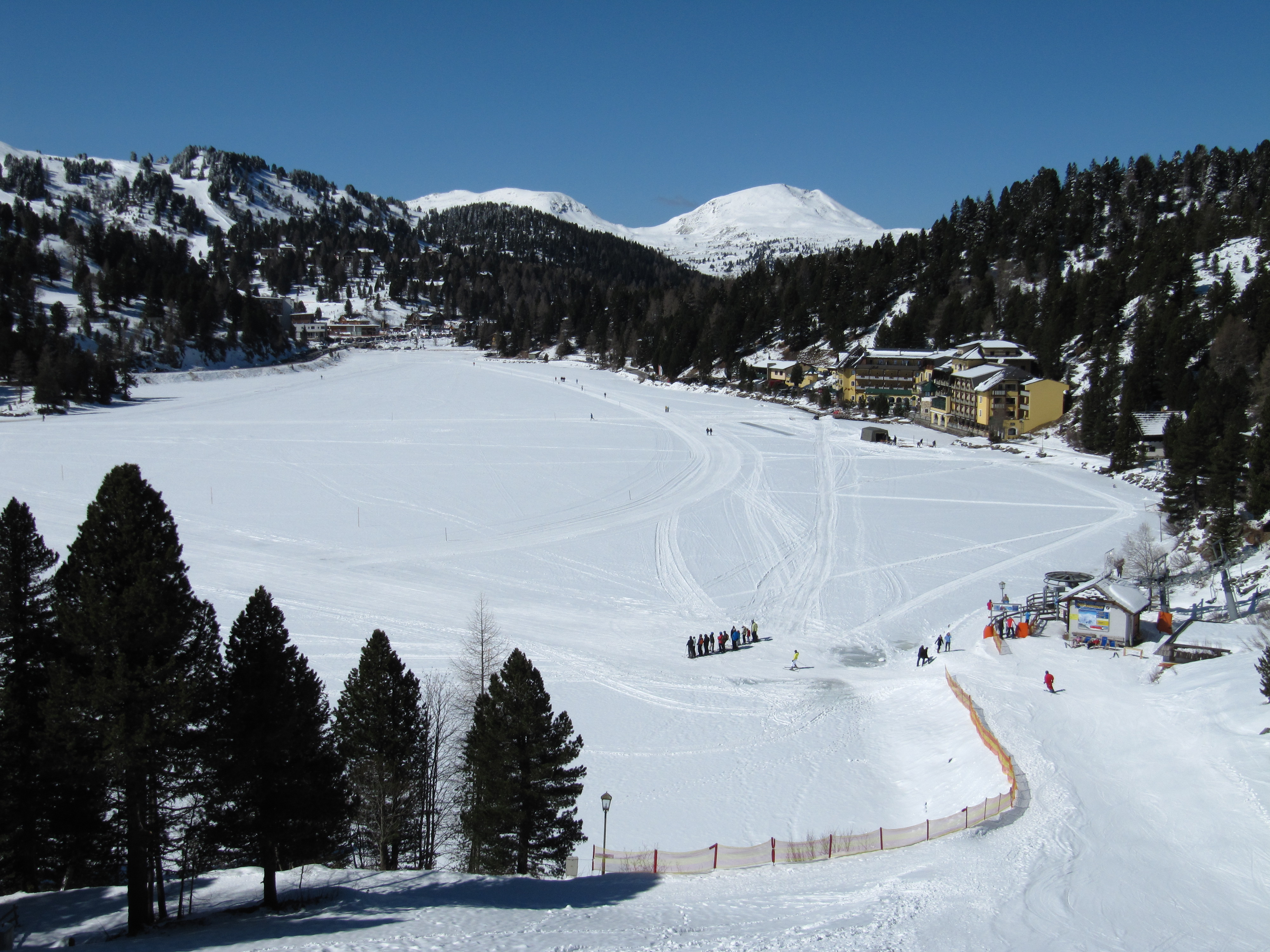
Lake Turrach in winter

The lake is located within the Gurktal Alps (Nock Mountains) at a height of 1,763 m (5,784 ft) above sea-level. Due to the altitude, it frequently freezes over in winter. In summer, the water temperature can reach a maximum of 18 °C (64 °F); the waters therefore are hardly used for bathing, except for a hotel beach on the southern shore equipped with thermal pumps.

Lake Turrach is fed by a mountain stream and several marshy meadows, the water drains northwards into the Styrian Mur valley at Predlitz. It was the first Carinthian lake to be protected from the discharge of wastewater by a sewage system. Today, several species of fish occur, among them brown trout and arctic char.

Since 2012 the Carinthian part of the lake belongs to the UNESCO Salzburg Lungau and Nock Mountains biosphere reserve.
