= Nockberge National Park =

Biosphere reserve in Austria

Coordinates: 46.87699°N 13.74948°E

Nockberge National Park was a 184 km^{2} / 23.3 km national park in Upper Carinthia, Nockberge in Austria. It was established in 1987 and dissolved in 2012. In July 2012, it was converted into Salzburger Lungau und Kärntner Nockberge, a UNESCO designated biosphere reserve.

== History ==
Originally, a ski area had been planned in what is now the core zone of the Nockberge since the early 1970s, when the region was opened up with the Tauern Autobahn. In 1979 the construction of the Nockalm Road, which connected the Liesertal with the uppermost Gurktal, began. It was supposed to open up the Nockberge for tourism and was expanded to a continuously paved, toll tourist road by 1981.

The plans to develop what is now the core area of Carinthia with, among other things, 18 cable cars and lifts as well as two hotel villages with a total of 3,000 beds on both sides of the Nockalmstrasse met with little approval from the population. A citizens' initiative carried out a referendum, which on December 7, 1980 resulted in a 94% vote against this type of tourism. Instead, ski areas emerged in Innerkrems and on the Turracher Höhe.

The Nockberge National Park was established on January 1, 1987. In the ordinance of the Carinthian provincial government of 1987 it said among other things:

- The national park should be preserved in its complete or extensive originality for the benefit of the population of the region and the Republic of Austria, for the benefit of science and to promote the regional economy.
- The flora and fauna characteristic of the national park, including their habitats and its historically significant objects and parts of the landscape, should be preserved.
- The national park should enable as large a group of people as possible an impressive natural experience in the future.

It covered 184 km^{2} (47% Krems, 23% Bad Kleinkirchheim, 21% Radenthein, 9% Reichenau), of which 77.3 km^{2} core zone with alpine areas and summit zones and 106.7 km^{2} outer zone with the extensive mountain forest level (these were divided into core and Care zone of the biosphere reserve converted).

Although it was established as a national park, the protected area was not classified by the IUCN as IUCN Category II ( English National Park ), but as Protected Landscape (Category V), because the Nockberg area has only minimal non-anthropogenic landscapes and the national park management is on preservation traditional alpine farming throughout the area. The protected area therefore did not fit into the IUCN scheme of Category II, which focused on species and ecosystem protection (making it publicly accessible).

On November 16, 2004, the Carinthia National Park Committee passed the unanimous decision to convert the National Park into a biosphere reserve based on the UNESCO concept. In these areas, a close connection between people and nature and sustainable development are paramount, and the protection goals are extended to include cultural assets much more comprehensively.
