= Großer Rosennock =

Mountain in the Gurktal Alps in Carinthia

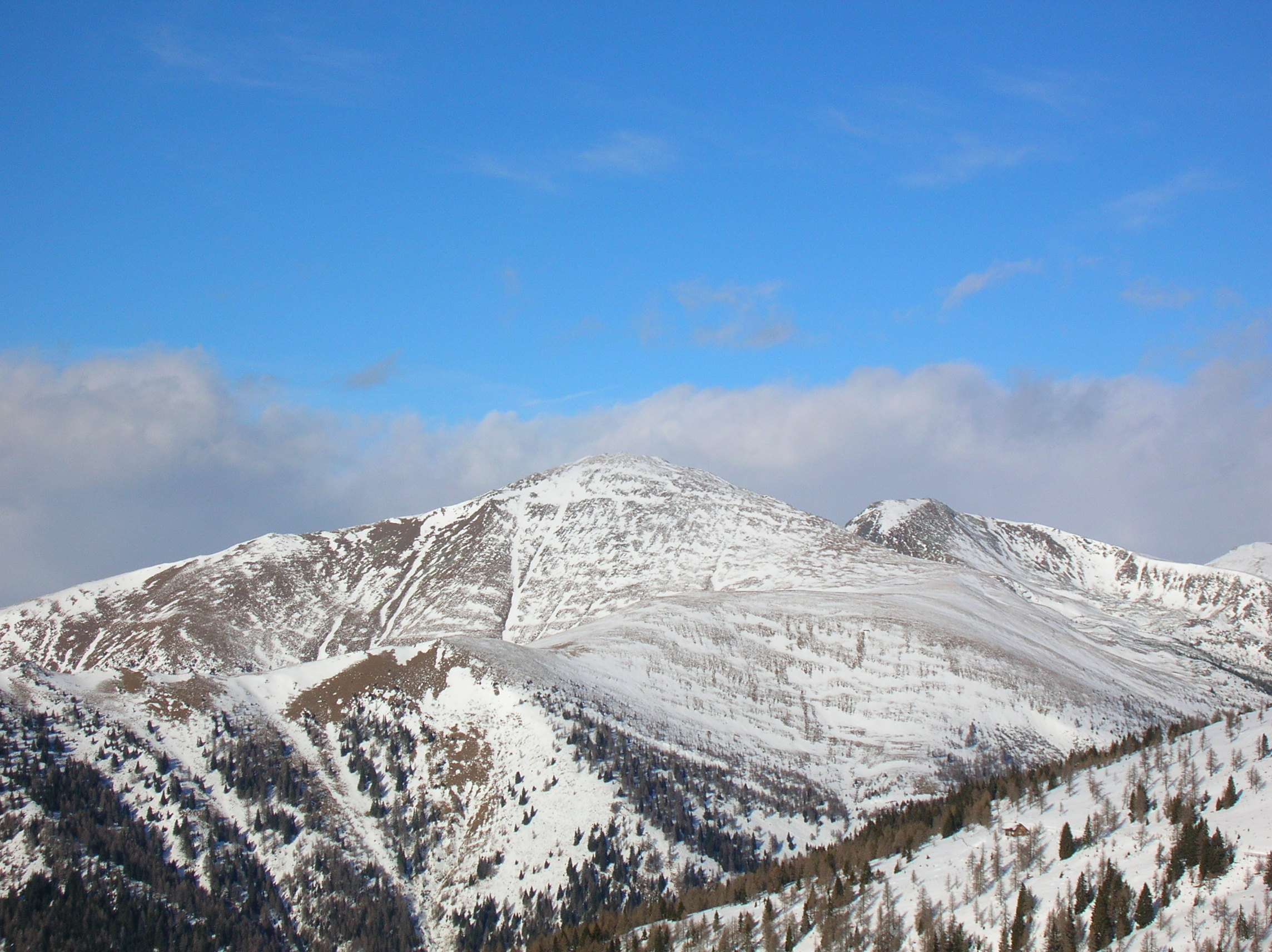
- Großer Rosennock (centre) with Kleiner Rosennock, right

Highest point
- Elevation: 2,440 m (8,010 ft)
- Prominence: 657 m (2,156 ft)
- Coordinates: 46°52′37″N 13°42′45″E

Geography
- Location within Alps
- Location: Carinthia, Austria
- Parent range: Gurktal Alps; Nock Mountains

The Großer Rosennock is, at 2,440 m AA (8,010 ft), the second highest of the Gurktal Alps in Carinthia, Austria, after the Eisenhut, which is just one meter higher.

The peak belongs to the southwestern Nock Mountains sub-range, and is located near Radenthein and the spa town of Bad Kleinkirchheim. East of the Rosennock massif, the Turracher Höhe Pass road leads to Upper Styria. As is typical of the Nock Mountains, the peak is smooth and grassy- It is a relatively easy climb to the summit, where one can find a panoramic view of many of the ranges of the Eastern Alps.
