= Rinsennock =

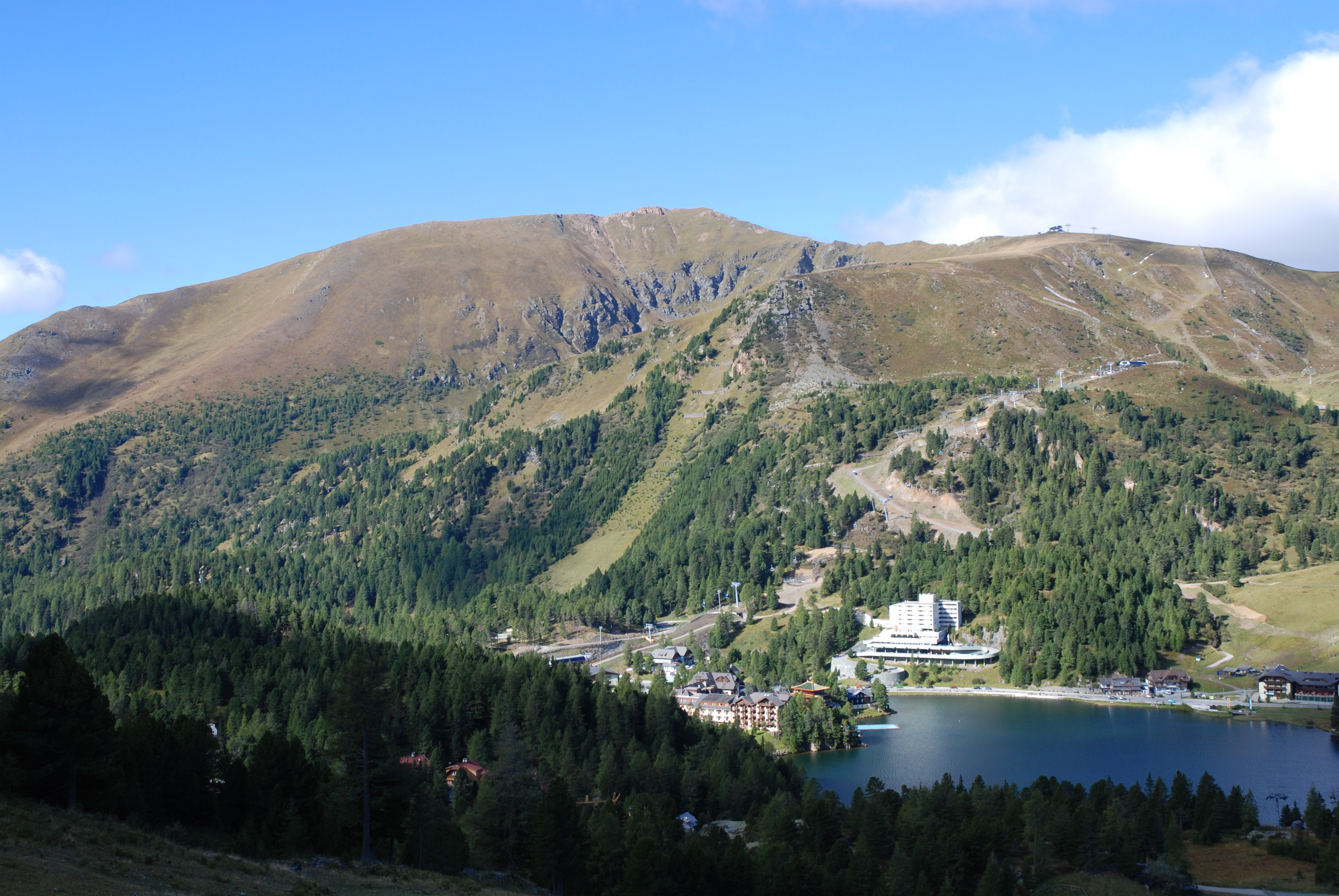
- Rinsennock (left) and Kornock (right)

Highest point
- Elevation: 2,334 m (7,657 ft)
- Prominence: 435 m (1,427 ft)
- Coordinates: 46°54′32″N 13°51′2″E

Geography
- Location within Alps
- Location: Carinthia, Styria, Austria
- Parent range: Gurktal Alps; Nock Mountains

The Rinsennock is a mountain in the Gurktal Alps in Austria. It is part of the Nock Mountains sub-range and located at the border of the state of Carinthia with Upper Styria, immediately west of Turracher Höhe Pass. The summit, at 2,334 metres above the Adriatic (7,657 ft), is a popular destination for hikers.
