= Turracher Höhe Pass =

Mountain pass in Austria

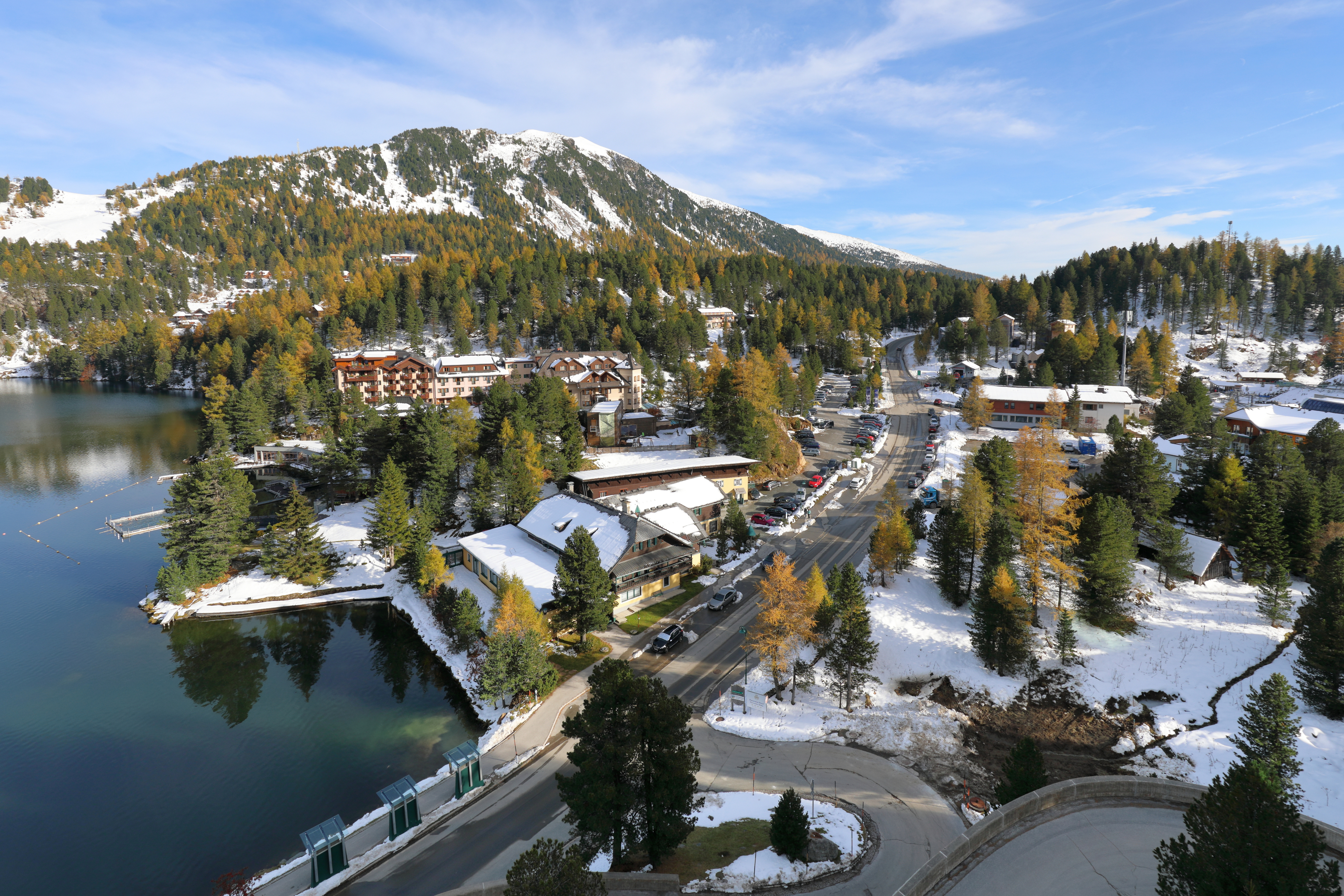

- Location within Alps
- Elevation: 1,795 m (5,889 ft)

Location
- Location: Austria
- Range: Alps
- Coordinates: 46°54′52″N 13°52′30″E

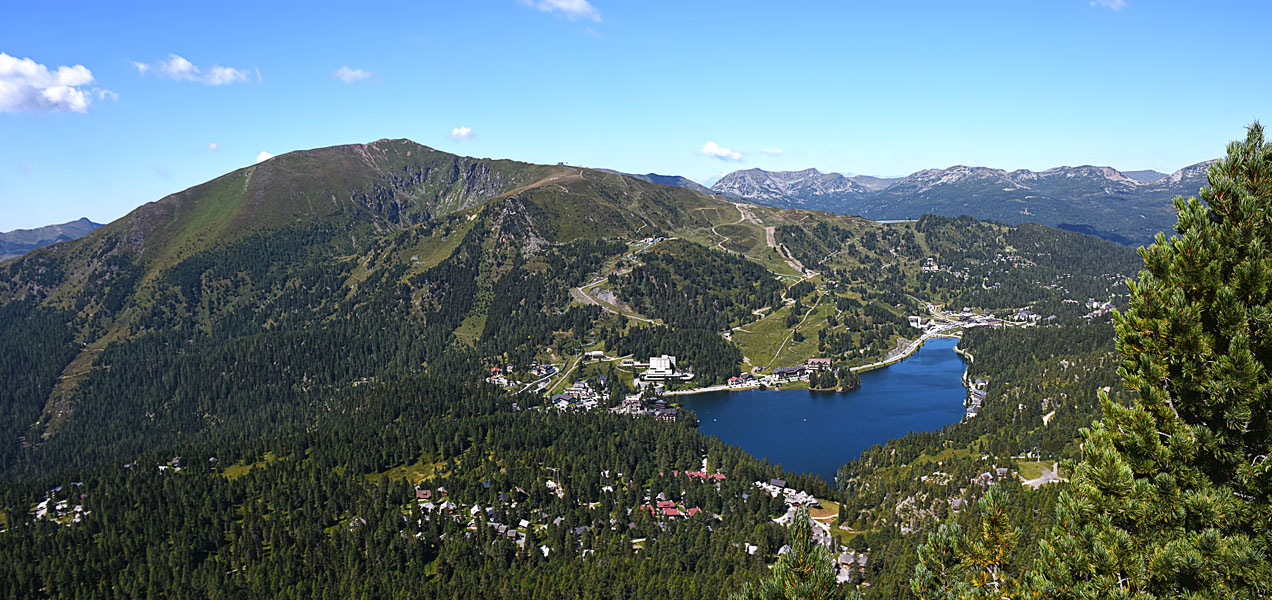
Turracher Höhe

Turracher Höhe, also called Turracherhöhe, refers to a village, a pass across the Alps, and a countryside in the Gurktal Alps in Austria. The village and the Turracher Lake at the pass, which both share the same name, are separated by the border of the two federal states of Styria and Carinthia. Because of its distance to early settlement areas and its high location, the region was not settled until relatively late. In the 17th century, mining was started below the Turracherhöhe. The opening up of the top of the pass by a paved road did not occur until later. During the 20th century, the region was gradually developed for tourism. Efforts are being made to maintain the diversity of flora and fauna of the Turracherhöhe by means of landscape conservation areas and careful and nature-oriented extension of the tourist facilities.

== Geography ==
=== Geographical location ===
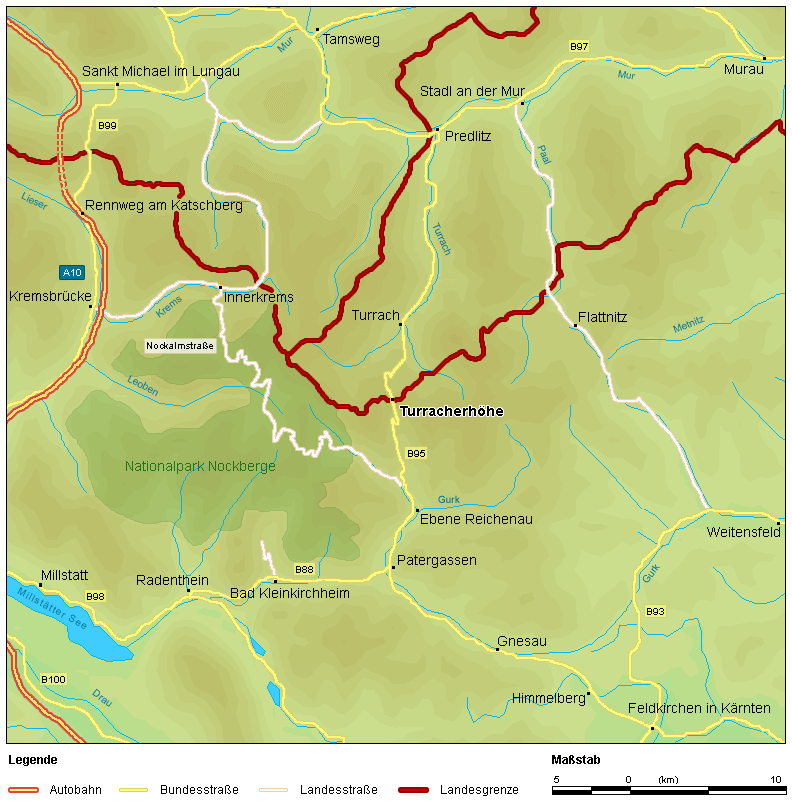
Streets and villages surrounding the Turracherhöhe

The Turracherhöhe is situated in the Nock mountains, the western part of the Gurktal Alps. The area extends from the peaks of the Rinsennock (2,334 m) in the west to the Lattersteighöhe (2,264 m) in the east; in the north-south direction, it extends from the village of Turrach to the plain of Reichenau in the south. Somewhat farther away are the peaks of Eisenhut (2,441 m), Großer Königstuhl (2,331 m), and Gruft (2,232 m).

The highest point of the approx. two km long pass summit has an altitude of 1,795 m above sea level south of the Turracher Lake. The lake has a water level of 1,763 m above sea (Adria) level and is connected to the village. The Turracher Höhe, as a "classic" pass summit, is also part of a drainage divide between the Mura valley and the Upper Gurk River, whose source is beneath the Lattersteighöhe at approx. 2,000 m above sea level.

The Turracher Road (B95), which goes from Salzburg along the western shore of Turracher Lake, connects the Styrian Upper Mura valley in the north with the Upper Gurk valley in Carinthia, and it continues further to Feldkirchen and the basin of Klagenfurt in the south. The road on the pass (from Turrach to the Reichenau plain) has a length of 16 km; the section between the junctions to the Murauer Road (B97) in Predlitz and the Kleinkirchheimer Road (B88) near Patergassen is 35 km long.

A total of three municipalities share the region of Turracher Höhe: Styrian Predlitz-Turrach in the north and the Carinthian municipalities of Reichenau and Albeck in the south. There are no direct roads onto the pass summit from Albeck.

=== The "divided" village ===
For a long time, there were only single farmsteads and accommodations for lumberjacks who chopped wood for the mines and smelting works in Turrach, as well as for the seasonal miners and stonemasons, on the Turracher Höhe. A compact settlement did not develop until tourism emerged in the second half of the 20th century.

Today, the village on the pass summit has around 100 inhabitants, and there are more than 400 secondary residences. Like the Turracher Lake, it belongs partly to the Styrian municipality of Predlitz-Turrach and partly to the Carinthian municipality of Reichenau. The border of the federal states runs roughly through the middle of the village and the lake. The northern part, which belongs to Styria, has the postal code 8864, the southern part on Carinthian territory has the postal code 9565; on the other hand, the telephone area code is the same for the whole village (04275).

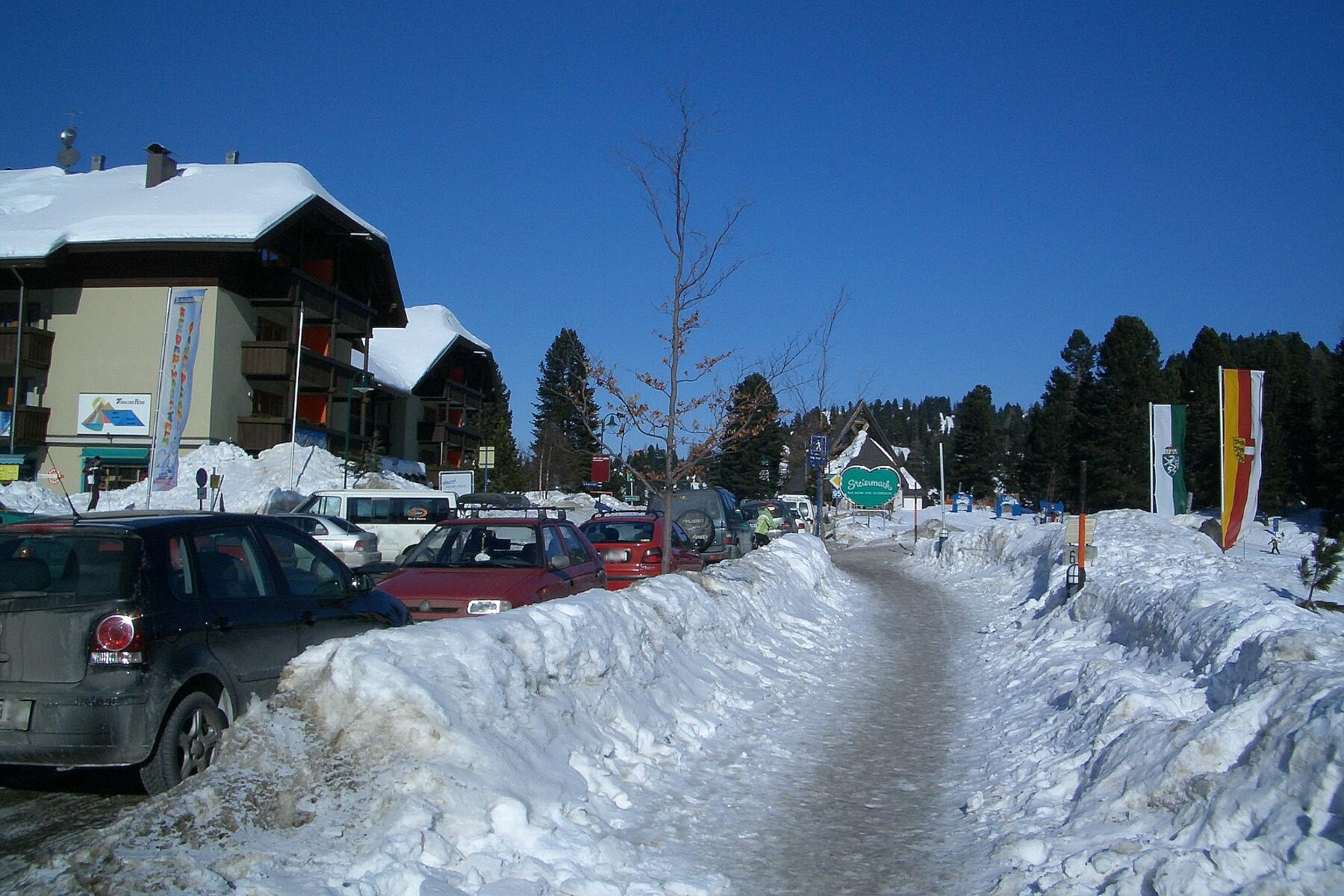
Turracherhöhe village centre. The state flags of Styria and Carinthia on the right

Thus, there are formally two villages on Turracher Höhe, where the Styrian part belongs to the district of Turrach in the municipality of Predlitz-Turrach, and the village of Turracherhöhe (official spelling) on the Carinthian side is a district of the municipality of Reichenau. But no town signs were installed within the village; a town sign at the entrance of the village announces the Reichenau district of "Turracherhöhe" on the Carinthian side, and a sign bears the inscription "Fremdenverkehrsgebiet Turracher Höhe" (Tourist Region Turracher Höhe) at the entrance to the Styrian village. Those who are not aware of the division of the village due to administrative politics can only suspect that the border between the two states runs here because of the two state flags along the former federal road.

In the wide saddle of the pass summit, where the road runs horizontally for two kilometres, there are two luxury hotels, a resort belonging to the German trade union IG Bau and over 30 small and medium-sized hotels and guest houses. There are many vacation houses in the southern and western stone pine forest, as well as the eastern side of the lake. However, these houses are predominantly concealed by trees or are situated in hollows, so they barely stand out from the natural surroundings.

The facilities include a bank and some shops for athletic items and souvenirs. But there is no grocery store or gasoline station in Turracher Höhe, for example. For a long time, there was also no church or chapel. An ecumenical place of worship was not built until 1985, at the suggestion of the inhabitants. It is administered by the parish of Stadl an der Mur and is available for all Christian creeds.

=== Climate ===
There is plenty of sunshine during the entire year. Due to the high altitude, there is significantly less cloudiness and fog than in the Drau valley, for example. Thus, the average prevailing temperatures are also favorable: the average temperature in January is between -5.9 and -8.2 °C, in July it is between 10.6 and 11.0 °C, and the yearly median is 1.9 to 2.2 °C. By comparison, Klagenfurt, with a height of 447 m above sea level, is 1300 m lower than Turracher Höhe. Its average temperature in January is -5.8 °C, its average temperature in July is 18.3 °C, and its yearly median is 7.7 °C.

The precipitation of 1,218 mm is rather low for the mountains. Snowfall normally starts in October at the latest, and a dense blanket of snow quickly forms, which remains until April or sometimes even until May. On average, there is snow for 158 days on Turracher Höhe.

== History ==
=== First settlements ===
The name Turrach is derived from the old term, "Durrach", which was used for a forest, where there are a lot of fallen, dried up ("dürr") trees lying around. The term is widely used in Carinthia, as well as in the rest of Austria.

While the region around today's Predlitz and the Mur was already colonised by Slavs in the 6th century, the first clearings and settlements south of Turracher Höhe are known to be from the early 14th century. Politically, the region was initially part of the duchy of Carinthia, but it was already divided among three territories in the 12th and 13th centuries, due to the splitting off of the Lungau to Salzburg and Murau to the duchy of Styria. Until tourism began to develop in the late 1920s, there had only been a few farmsteads north and south of the pass summit since the late Middle Ages, but no compact settlement. Also Turracher Höhe played no role as a traffic route for a long time. During the Middle Ages and early modern times, connections over the Katschberg in the west and over the Flattnitz in the east were the main traffic routes in the north-south direction, while routes over Turrach had only local importance, e.g. for the transport of salt from the Salzkammergut to Reichenau (first documented mention in 1332), where there was a branch of the toll office.

In the upper Mura valley north of Turracher Höhe, the region around Predlitz (first documented mention in 1311) was sparsely populated because the slopes to the right of the Mura were less suitable for cultivation. During the Middle Ages, the dominant settlement of this region was Murau, which belonged to Liechtenstein. But south of Turracher Höhe, rural colonization around Reichenau, where there was also a regional court in 1520, provided more compact settlements and single farms.

=== Mining ===
With a certificate issued in Moosheim dating from the year 1256, the Carinthian duke Ulrich III gave the minstrel and poet, Ulrich von Liechtenstein, the sovereign right for mining in the district of Murau, which contains the region around Turracher Höhe. However, concrete indications of mining in the Turrach region cannot be found either in this document or in the following centuries.

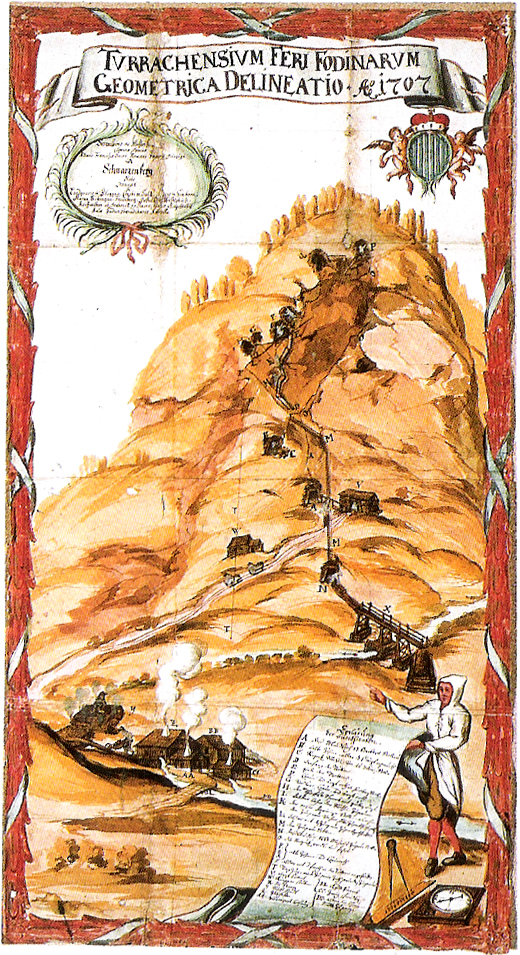
Map of the iron mine from 1707

In 1657, Johann Adolf Count Schwarzenberg, who ruled Murau, initiated the search for copper ore. In the Steinbachgraben, huge amounts of limonite (a type of iron ore) were found, whereupon the count asked Emperor Leopold I for a license for mining and smelting, which was issued on January 31, 1660. Already in the same year, Johann Adolf ordered the building of a bloomery for smelting iron in Turrach, and in 1662, the first tapping was performed. Initially the mining and smelting took place mainly on the Styrian side around the village at the northern foothill. In 1783, Count Johann Nepomuk Anton of Schwarzenberg ordered the extension of the road, which was 15 km long, from Predlitz to his factory in Turrach, in order to facilitate the ore transport. But there were routes for transporting wood and charcoal above the village, too, which reached today's pass summit.

The general economic crisis resulting from the Napoleonic Wars and their consequences also reached Turrach's mining in the first two decades of the 19th century. Following that, the iron business—under Peter Tunner senior (the father of Peter Tunner), who led the company from 1823 to 1844—underwent a considerable advancement, due to the streamlining of working methods and the introduction of modern technologies. In the middle of the 19th century, the annual quantity of ore delivered by the approximately 60 miners amounted to about 100 to 120,000 quintals (approx. 5,600 to 6,700 t). At that time, mining was only done during the winter, because the ore had to be pulled to the smelting facilities in bags.

As of 1863, a rocking Bessemer converter, which made the steel production more efficient, was used in Turrach. In 1865, three converters with a capacity of 35 to 40 quintals and two blast furnaces were available. At that time, the iron smelting facility was Styria's largest and was considered to be one of the most modern in Europe. In spite of the technical innovations, there was soon an economic decline. As of the 1870s, the sales worsened; the production of raw iron decreased from 3,800 to 1,500 t between 1869 and 1885. Besides increasing coal prices, Turrach's disadvantageous location off the major transport routes caused high transportation costs, which were responsible for the decreasing competitiveness of the iron companies. In 1899, the iron smelting facility was leased out, which brought no improvement, so the furnace in Turrach was finally shut down in the spring of 1909.

Besides iron mining, copper mining occasionally played a role. Other natural resources are small amounts of high-grade anthracite coal, which was mined until the 1950s and 1960s. The mining of cinnabar at the Kornock can already be proven in the 17th century. A former stone pit at Lake Turrach, as well as a magnesium carbonate and a slate pit, are evidence of the mining activities around Turracher Höhe, which however were entirely given up in the course of the 20th century for economic reasons.

=== Development of tourism ===
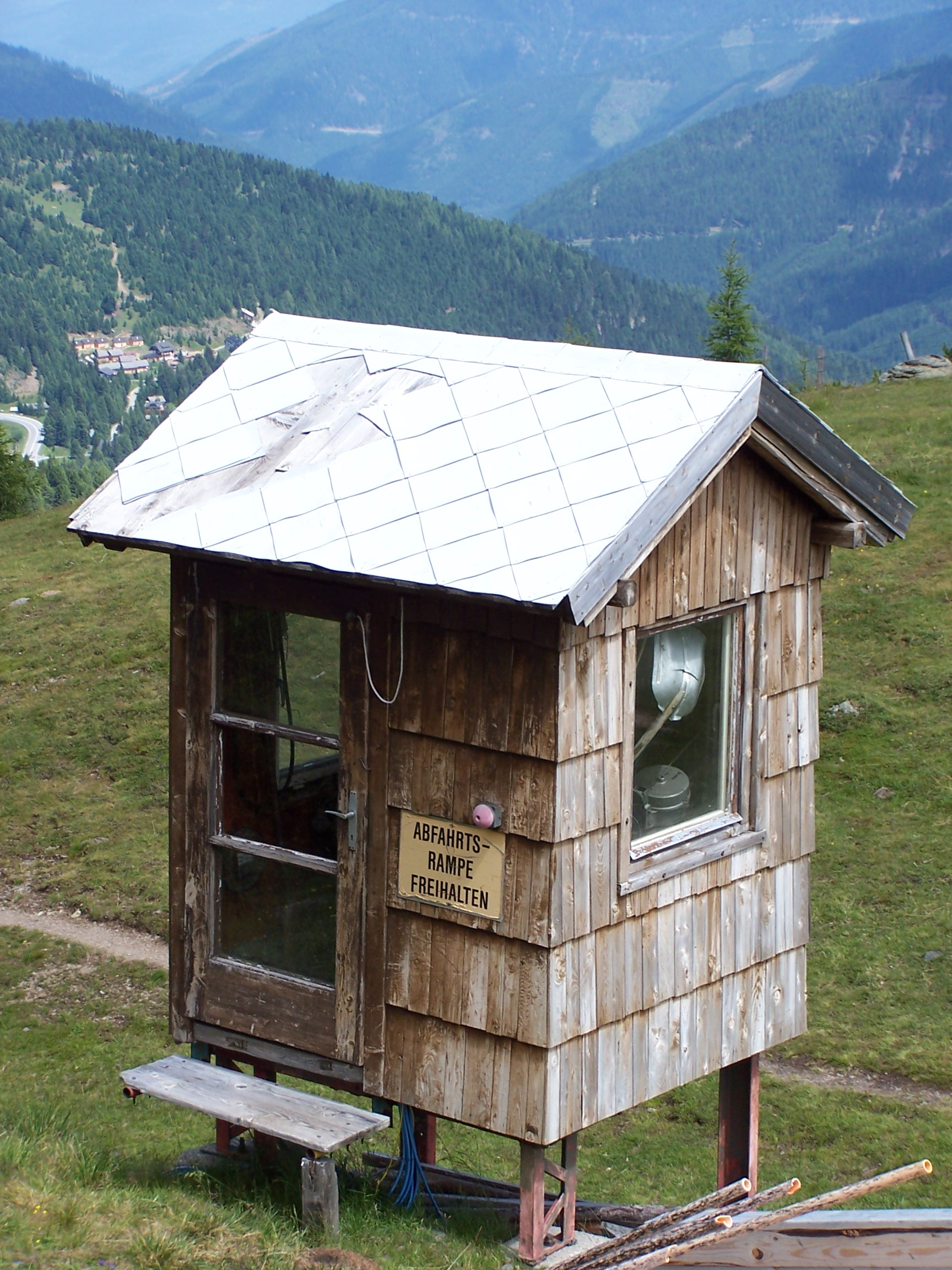
Ski lift attendant's hut at the end of a T-bar lift

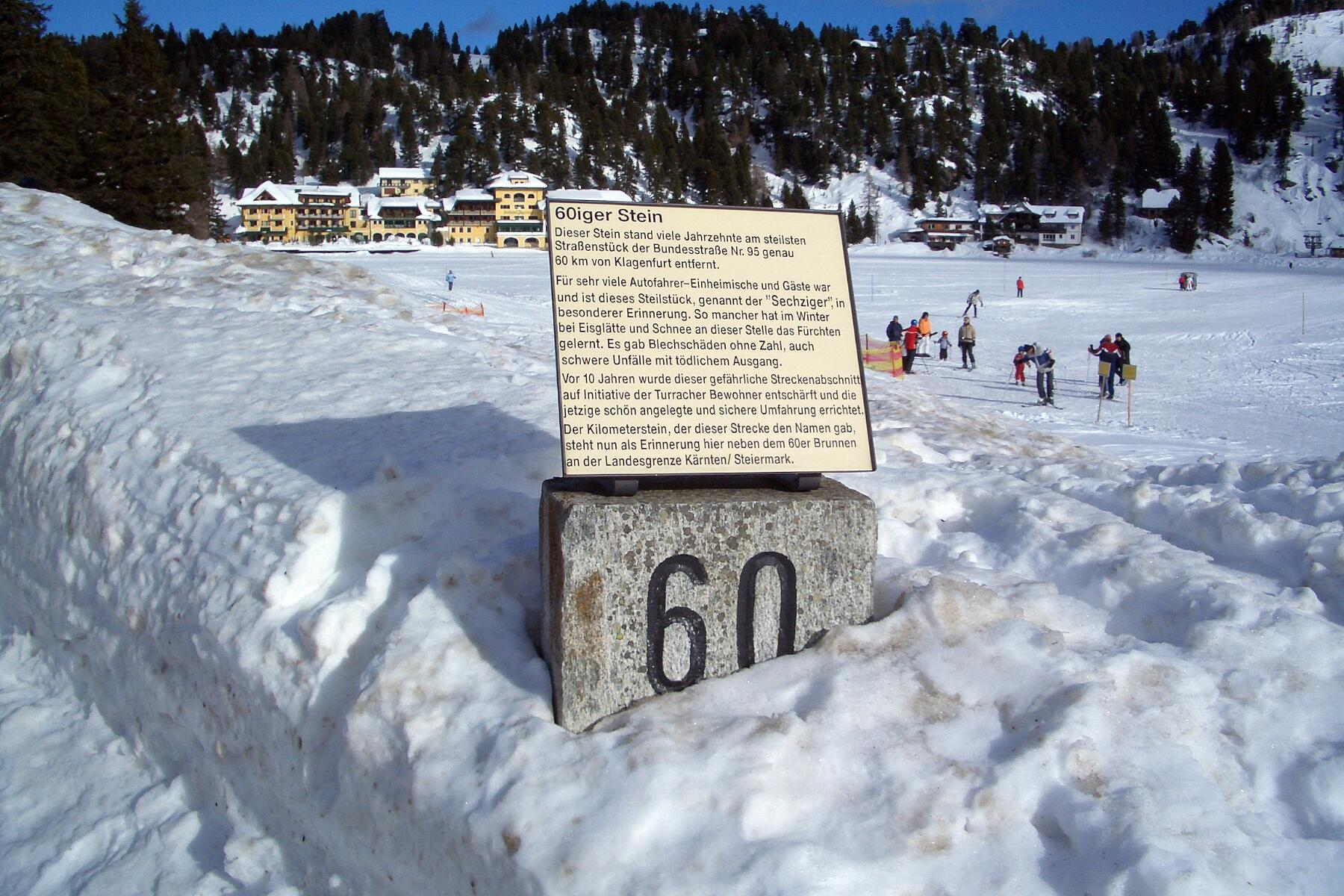
Sixty-kilometre stone, moved to the middle of the village

In the 19th century, the first housing was built on the pass summit at the Turracher Lake. It served as accommodations, as well as for serving the lumberjacks, stonemasons and miners. Thus, it is known that at the provably oldest inn still existing today on the Turracher Höhe, the "Seewirt", there was already an Alpine public house in operation in 1830. Already at the end of the 19th century, the first tourists came for hiking on the Turrach and shortly before the First World War, the first skiers came for extended ski trips. Little by little, other hotels and inns also opened, among which are the "Jägerwirt" (1905), "Siegel" (1911) and "Hochschober" (1929), which still exist today.

It has not been recorded when an old mountain track was converted into a road. On the south side, it is known that the stone "Teufelsbrücke" (Devil's Bridge) was built over the ravine of the Stangenbach in 1893. Between the wars, the streets, which already at that time essentially had the same course they have today, were adapted to the demands of modern automobile traffic. On the south side, bus service was established in 1928, and the bus line Predlitz–Passhöhe followed in the north in 1929. However, the first tourists were nevertheless forced to walk for kilometres to their quarters on the Turracher Höhe in the winter, since the buses could not manage the steep climb under winter conditions. The first private holiday home was erected on a small hill on the north side of Turracher Lake in 1936.

In the winter after the Second World War, the first English tourists already came to Carinthia, which was occupied by the British troops. They were quartered in the seized businesses of Siegel, Hochschober, Jägerwirt and in the small holiday home. In 1946, a T-bar lift was built at about the same height as today's Kornockbahn and it was at first reserved for use by the English. Because of that, a lift on the Turracher Alpe is still called "Engländerlift" (Englishman's Lift) today. In the 1950s, the first single chairlift came, and the Panorambahn, as well. It was replaced in 1983 by a new single chairlift. This was also replaced in September 2006 by a new combination chairlift/cabin-lift. In 1966, the "Pauli Schlepplift" went into operation, named for Paul Pertl, which is still there today. A ski tow on the beginner's meadow was also added. In December 1976, the double chairlift, "Kornockbahn", opened, which was replaced with a six-person chairlift equipped with heated seats. The newest acquisition is the new stone pine forest six-person lift, as of 2006/2007.

As of the 1970s, the crowd of winter athletes on the Turracher Höhe increased and as a result, the gradient of the federal road was evened out little by little by adjustments of the route. From 1978 until 1980, a new section of the road, which had been affected time and again by avalanches, was opened on the Kornock above the old road, with avalanche barriers.

The steepest Alpine road in Europe at times, with a gradient of up to 34% at kilometre 60 (reckoned from Klagenfurt), was also sometimes a test stretch of the automobile manufacturer, Porsche, produced after the Second World War in nearby Gmünd in Carinthia, because of its high demands on automobiles. In January 1978, Audi presented the newly developed Audi Quattro to the company leadership on the Turracher Höhe, where the performance of the new all-wheel drive could be convincingly demonstrated on the steep, curvy and snowy road of the pass.

The pass road has a maximum gradient of "only" 23% today on a short section on the Carinthian side. It is well cleared in the winter and only has to be closed very rarely.

== Economy and infrastructure ==
The dominant branch of the economy on the Turracher Höhe today is tourism. Besides hotels, inns and ski lift operations, as well as a few small shops and the mineral museum, no businesses are based here. After mining was stopped in the 20th century, the timber industry and forestry are the only "traditional" branch of business still existing on the Turracher Höhe, aside from a few small agricultural operations.

=== Lumber and forestry ===
There are still large expanses of woodlands in the Mura valley and in the region between Predlitz and the Turracher Höhe even today in family ownership, which come from the lands acquired by the House of Schwarzenberg in 1623. They are managed by the "Fürstlich Schwarzenberg'schen Familienstiftung" (Prince Schwarzenberg Family Foundation). The area managed by the forest administration in Turrach in the region of the municipality of Predlitz-Turrach is 8,411 ha in total, of which 5,804 ha are commercial forest and barrier woodlands, as well as 2,607 ha of Alpine and miscellaneous areas at an altitude between 930 and 2,434 metre above sea level. The trees felled by the forest administration of Turrach amount to around 24,000 solid cubic metres (or stères) per year, of which 79% is from clearcutting and 21% is from selection cutting.

The woodlands on the southern side of the Turracher Höhe are also privately owned for the most part; 90% of the entire forest land of the municipality of Reichenau is distributed over plots of land of under 200 ha. The yield is mostly sold as logs; there are no sawmills or other wood processing operations in the immediate vicinity of the Turracher Höhe.

=== Water supply ===
Drinking water is supplied from two springs near the Grün Lake and a further one from Kornock. The quality of the drinking water and of the Turrach lakes is very good, since the community is connected to a public sewerage system which was built from 1967 through 1972, so that the accumulated waste water is diverted over the Reichenau plain to purification plants in Feldkirchen. The Turracher Lake was the first lake in Carinthia for which a sewerage plant was entirely completed.

=== Energy ===
The Turracher Höhe was first connected in 1957 to the public electric supply system of KELAG, an Austrian electric company based in Klagenfurt. Up until then, electricity was produced by generators by each piece of property. With the construction of a district heating plant in 1997, hotels and many vacation homes are connected to an environmentally friendly supply of heating.

=== Transportation ===
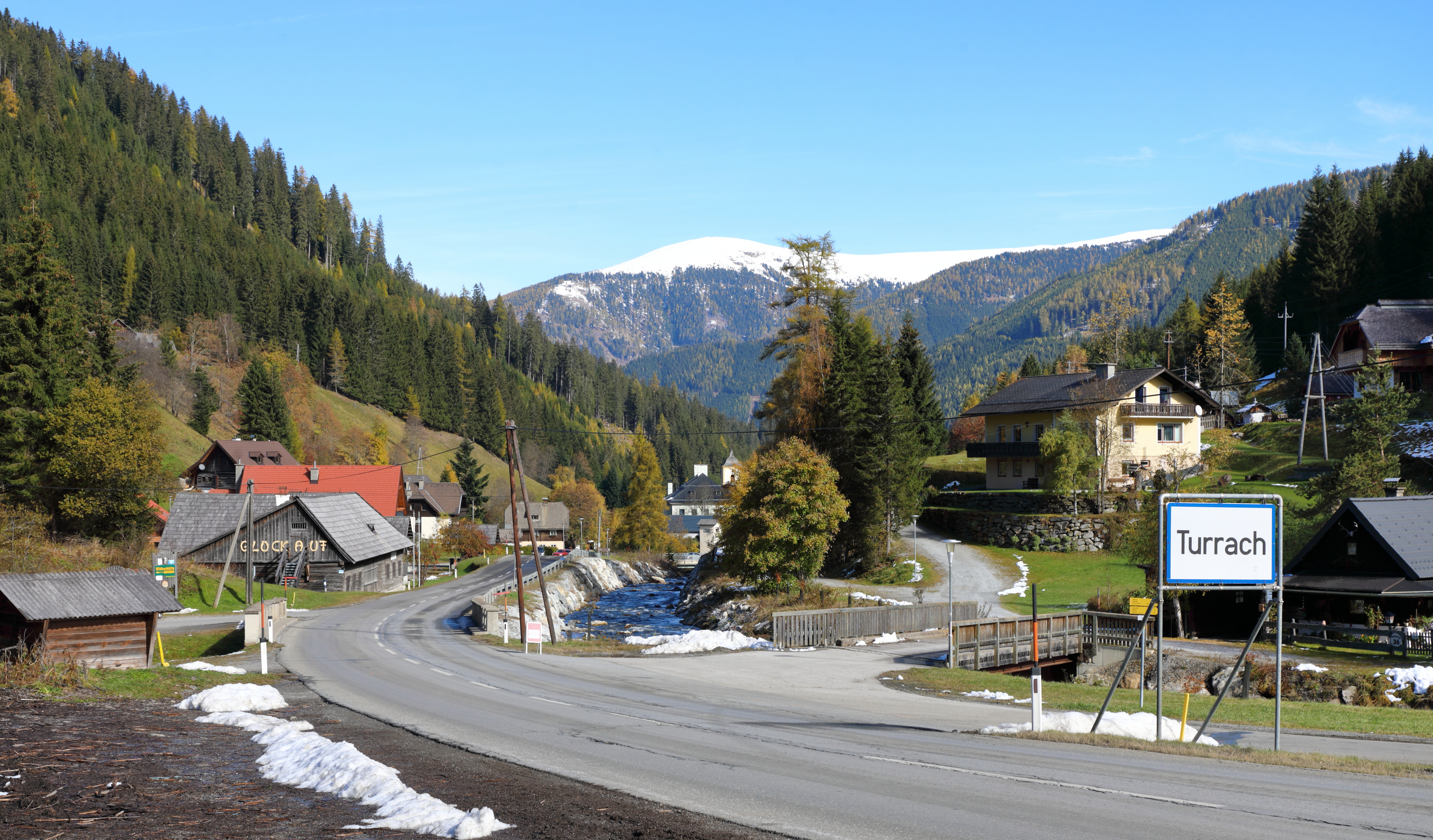
The B95, entering Turrach from the Turracher Höhe

The Turracher Straße (B95) crossing the Turracher Höhe has a comparatively low importance as a national north-south connection between Carinthia and the federal states bordering to the north, Salzburg and Styria. It was known as the steepest Carinthian pass road, however, it is more gentle today because the roadway was moved, so that no escape route is necessary. The roads which are used considerably more by long-distance traffic are the Tauernautobahn (A10) and the Katschberg Straße (B99) from Bischofshofen to Spittal on the west, which runs parallel to the A10, and the Friesacher Straße (B317) from Judenburg to Klagenfurt east of the Turracher Höhe.

The Turracher Höhe is only sparsely served by public transportation. From Predlitz, where the "Predlitz Turracher Höhe" train station of the Murtalbahn is located, a bus line of the Verkehrsverbund Steiermark (Styrian Transport Association) runs to the pass summit a few times a day, and the same for a bus connection of the ÖBB (Österreichischen Bundesbahnen, Austrian Federal Railways) to Reichenau and further to Klagenfurt.

== Tourism ==
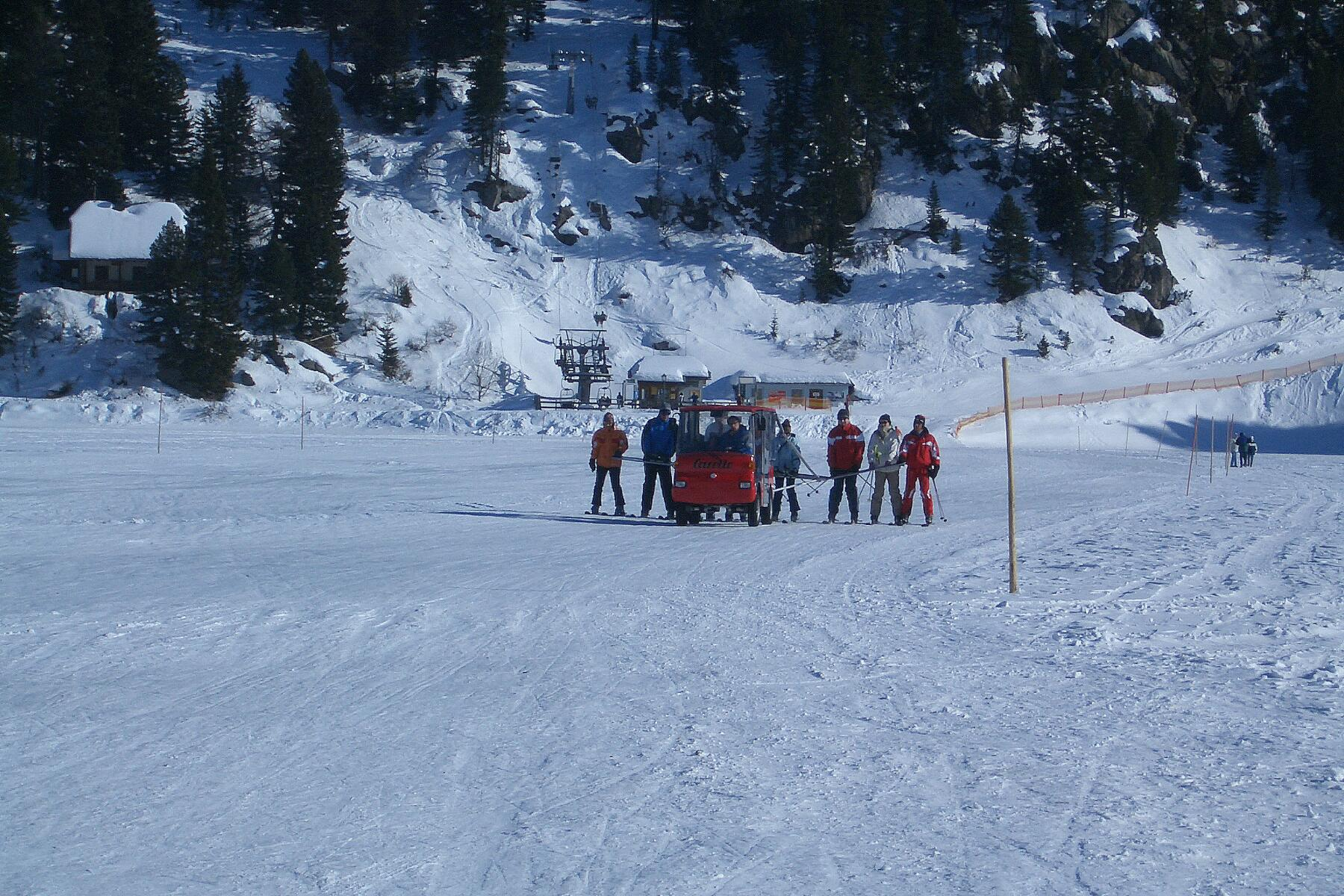
"Seetaxi" (lake taxi) on the frozen lake

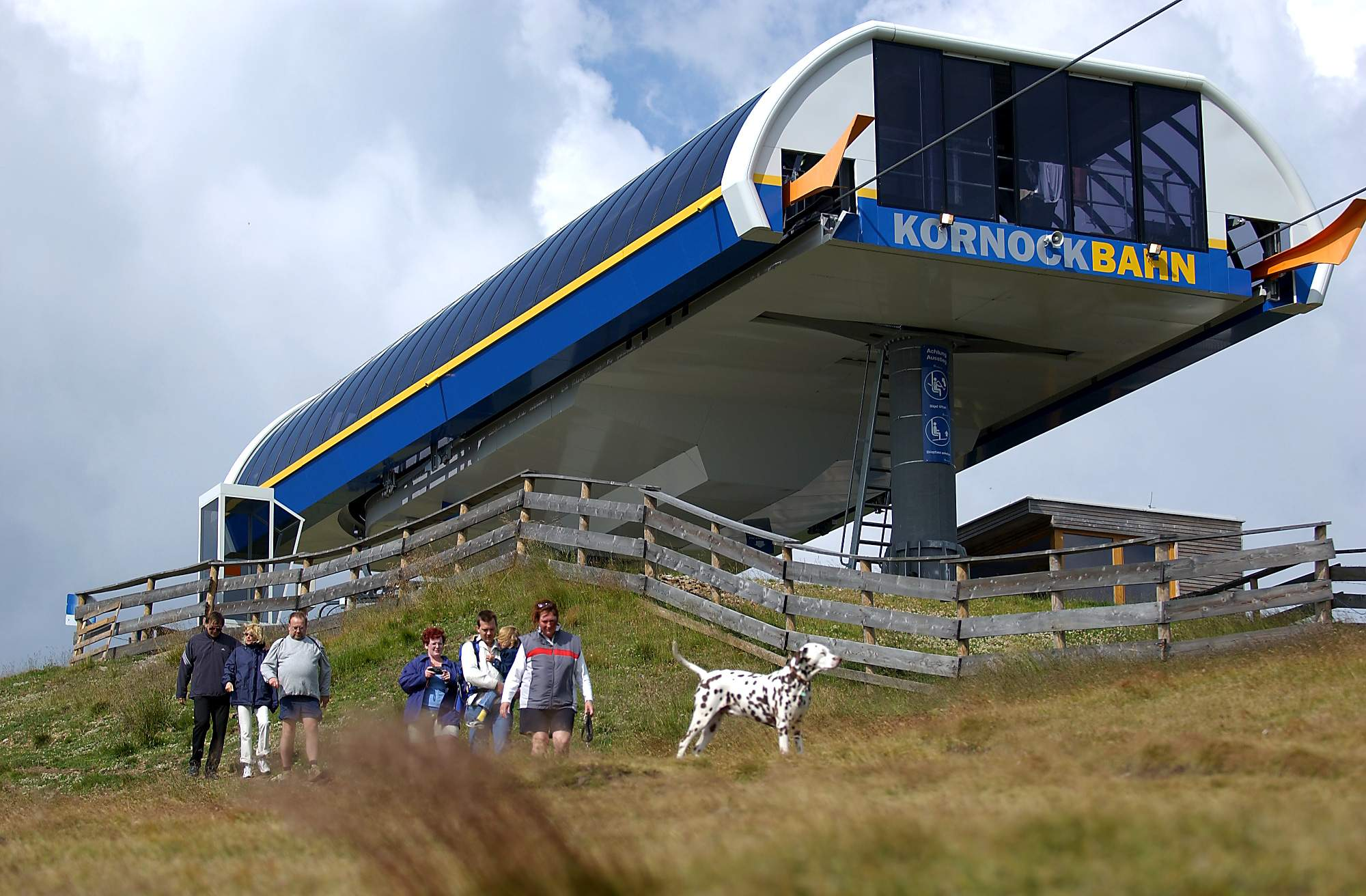
Summit station of the Kornockbahn

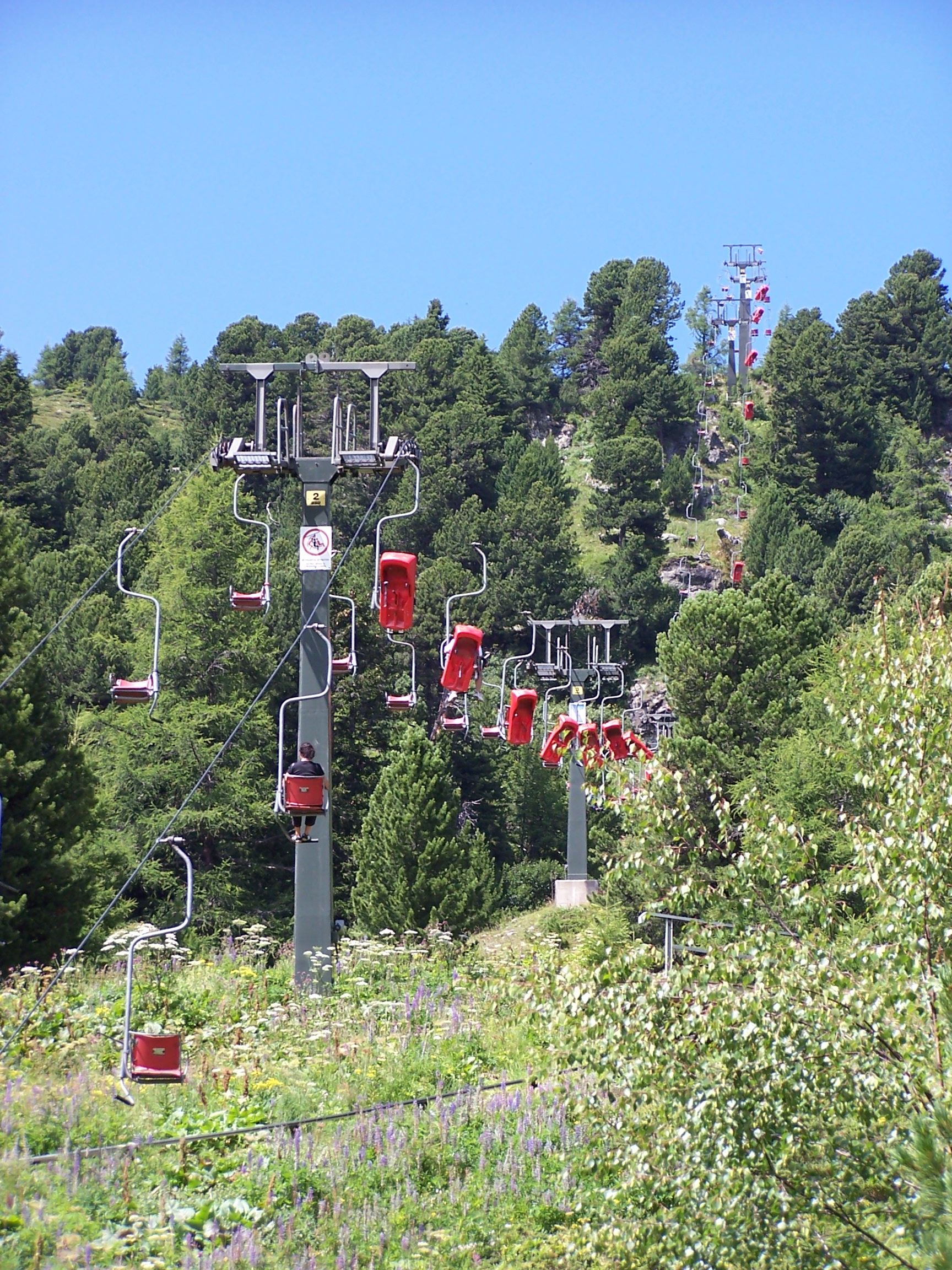
Chair lift for the dry toboggan run (Sommerrodelbahn), since replaced

The Turracher Höhe was developed for summer tourism as well as winter tourism. There were 233,000 overnight stays registered recently, two-thirds of them in the winter season of 2004/05 and one third in the summer season of 2005. A total of 1,350 commercial and 570 private beds were offered for guests. On average, 320 people are employed in the tourism trade per year. The extension of the tourist offerings has happened in a careful and natural way since the first national regional development concept of 1963. A development model for the years 2005 through 2015 (see External links) plans further development according to these principles. In summer of 2007, the new 1600 m long year-round toboggan run was opened.

=== Winter tourism ===
In winter, five chairlifts (one of them a combined gondola-chairlift beside the year-round toboggan run) and nine T-bar lifts along the 38 ski runs begin operation. The "Hausberg" is the Kornock (2.193 m), with two chairlifts running along its eastern slope, the Kornockbahn and the Panoramabahn. The station at the bottom of the Kornockbahn lift is in the middle of the village and also runs in the summer. On the northern slope of the Turracher Höhe, there is a demanding FIS ski run into the Turrach valley. In the eastern and western flanks of the saddle, there are longer ski runs of easy to medium difficulty.

In total, 25 km of cross-country ski runs have been laid, with winter hiking paths beside them. On the lake, areas for ice skating and curling are kept free of snow. The "Seetaxi" is unique. It is a snowmobile with holding rods, which shuttles along the border between Styria and Carinthia between the ski lifts east and west of the lake and pulls skiers over the frozen lake without charge.

=== Summer tourism ===
The Turracher Lake is seldom used for swimming in the summer, since the water temperature rarely goes above 18 °C. That is why the offerings for summer tourism, which has only about half as many visitors as during the winter months, is essentially limited to the numerous hiking paths around the lakes and in the surrounding mountainous country. Five hiking trails are marked as so-called "Geopfade" (Geo-paths), with display boards describing places worth noticing ("Geopunkte", Geo-points) along the way. In the summer, two chair lifts and the toboggan run are also in operation.

In addition, the Turracher Höhe is at the eastern edge of the Nationalpark Nockberge. About one kilometre before the Reichenau plain, the Nockalmstraße, a toll road, branches off to the national park from the Turracher Straße.

=== Museums ===
The privately operated museum, "Alpin+Art+Gallery", was founded in 1960 as a small mineral museum and it was expanded and newly conceived in 2000. The original museum was in a converted Troadkåstn, as the grain silos in Carinthia are named. During the expansion, an additional building with 400 m^{2} of exhibition space was added.

In the village of Turrach at the foot of the Turracher Höhe, there is another museum, "Holz und Eisen" (Wood and Iron), which exhibits items from the time of mining in the region and also offers tours of the old buildings and mining tunnels. Additional articles from the mining and smelting operations can be viewed in the "Eisensaal" (Iron Hall) of Castle Murau. The famous Bessemer converter from Turrach is in the Technische Museum in Vienna today.

== Nature ==
=== Geology ===
The geological construction of the Turracher Höhe is characterised by various kinds of rock, as well as the effects of the tectonic movements, which became visible here and finally led to the formation of the Alps in the late Mesozoic era about 100 million years ago. The eastern Central Alps got their current structure at the end of the Tertiary Period.

From the geological viewpoint, the Turracher Höhe and its further surroundings belong to the Gurktal layer, whose Paleozoic rocks slid over the more recent rock layer of the so-called Stangalm Triassic Period. On and under the course of the sliding, there are a whole series of smaller and larger deposits of siderite and limonite. Those are among the ones in Steinbachgraben and Rohrerwald near Turrach, which were the basis for the iron smelting there.

The most commonly appearing minerals on the Turracher Höhe are the Gurktal phyllite (created in the Lower Silurian) and Eisenhutschiefer (Upper Silurian to Middle Devonian), and on the other side of the Gurktal layer also Altkristallin (paragneiss, mica schist, amphibolite), some of which were created in the Ediacaran Period. The narrow strips of the Stangalm Triassic Period, which lie between them, consist of limestone and dolomite.

During the various ice ages of the Quaternary Period, the Turracher Höhe was glaciated. In the Würm glaciation, there were partial currents of the Mura glacier, which flowed out of the feeding area of the Niederen Tauern to the south. About 20,000 years ago, a strong warming within 1,000 to 1,500 years made the glacial net melt off. As a rare relic of the Würm ice age, there is a glacial mill west of Turracher Lake. Further effects of the glaciation can be observed in the shape of the terrain, as well as in many individual places of the Turracher Höhe. The rounded off mountain tops with tub-like depressions between them (cirques) are the results of the tectonic movements as well as the glaciation. One example of that is the Hohe Kor. There is also a further result of ice age glacial activity there, a moraine embankment.

=== Turrach Lakes ===
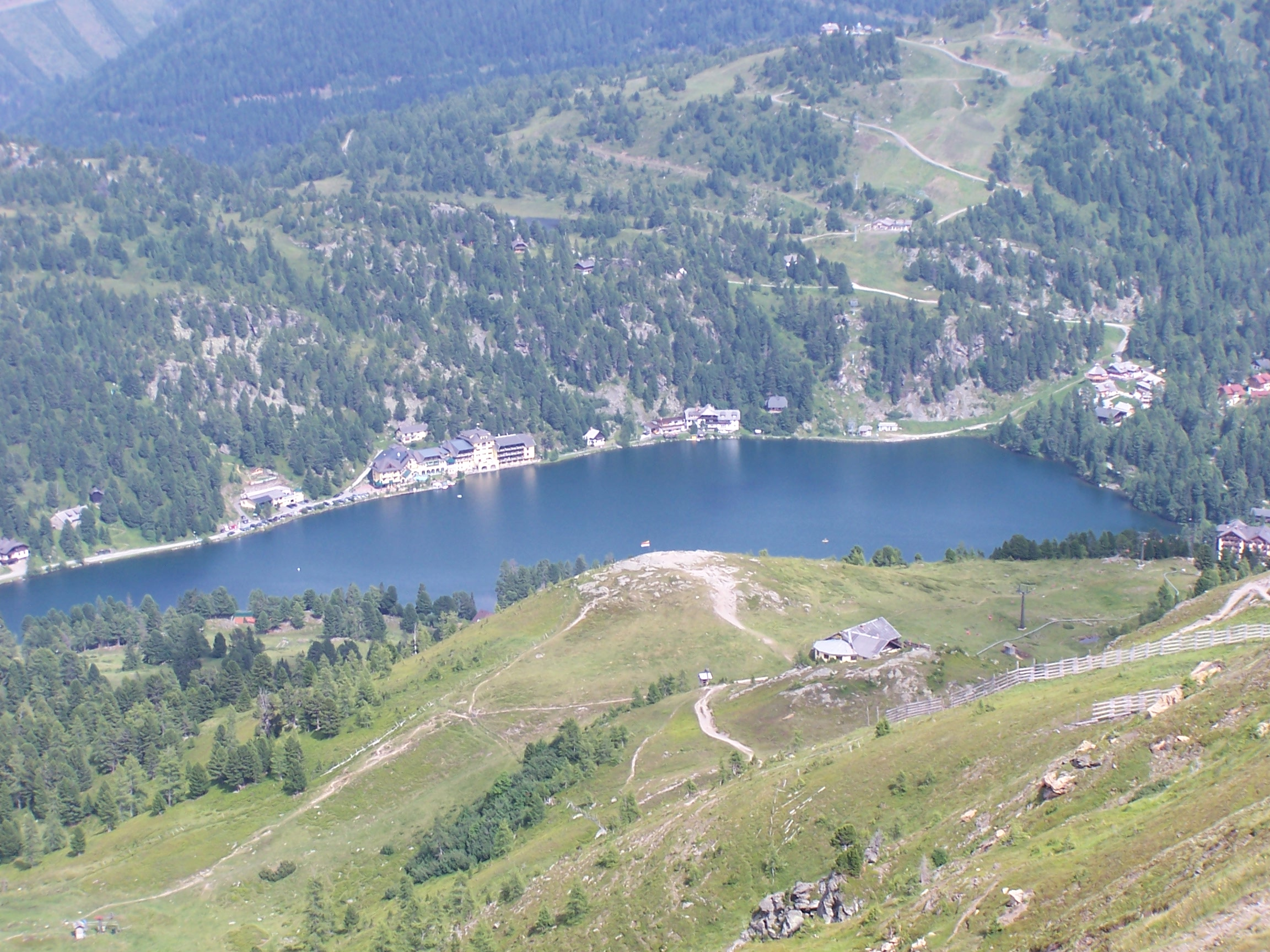
Turracher Lake, view from above, on the east shore

There are three lakes on the Turracher Höhe. According to legend, they were formed from the tears God shed when He saw the beauty He had created. By far the largest of them is the Turracher See (Turracher Lake), with an area of 19.4 ha. About 300 m away towards the east is the Schwarzsee (Black Lake, 2.6 ha). In the southern direction is the Grünsee (Green Lake, 1.48 ha). The two smaller lakes, left to nature, are less well known, since they are in a protected landscape area and no building is allowed on their shores, and because they can only be reached by footpaths.

The surface of the up to 33 metre deep Turracher See is completely frozen over for up to six months of the year. Since water from the lake is used to create artificial snow, the water level in the lake can vary by a few metres in the winter.

Aside from the lakes, marshes and bogs were also formed from the glaciers of the ice age because of the high level of the ground water. In the area of the pass summit, there are various types of bogs. In the area of the pass summit there are mainly fens with some smaller transitional mires and raised bogs. On the Kornock there is a vale moor in more than 2,000 m above sea level. The most important bog area adjoins the Schwarzsee and is probably a part of this body of water which has already silted up.

=== Flora ===
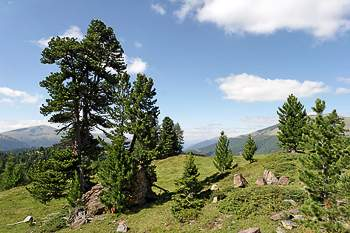
The Turracher Höhe is one of the largest unified areas of stone pine in Austria

The Turracher Höhe is in the area between montane and alpine vegetation. From the lower areas going upwards, there are secondary spruce forests, interrupted by commercial grasslands, spruce-larch forests, stone pine and stone pine-larch forests, then heaths of dwarf shrubs and subalpine and alpine grasses.

The predominant, extensive stands of stone pine (Pinus pinea) here are worth commenting on. They belong to the largest in Carinthia. The subalpine forests are often thinned out like a park, with an undergrowth including the ubiquitous rusty-leaved alpenrose (Rhododendron ferrugineum), as well as the alpine juniper (Juniperus communis subsp. alpina) and the spotted gentian (Gentiana punctata). On the Rauterriegel southeast of the Eisenhut, there is a spruce forest with a lot of stone pines. In the green alder (Alnus viridis) bushes at the avalanche slope southeast of the Rinsennock, there are many herbaceous tall forbs, such as monkshood (Aconitum napellus subsp. tauricum), masterwort (Peucedanum ostruthium), and Austrian doronicum (Doronicum austriacum). On the Kilnprein, there are large fields of mugo pine (Pinus mugo).

On the pass summit, there is a transitional mire: in the mud sedge bog (Caricetum limosae plant community) grow, in addition to the mud sedge (Carex limosa, endangered) which gives the name of the plant community, also the lesser twayblade (Neottia cordata) and the dwarf birch (Betula nana). In the fen south of the Schwarzsee, a brown sedge marsh (Caricetum fuscae subalpinum community) with the endangered species common sedge (or brown sedge, Carex nigra), round-leaved sundew (Drosera rotundifolia) and bastard sundew (D. x obovata), as well as dwarf birch. There is a vale mire on the Kornock. Aside from the dominant deer-hair sedge (Trichophorum cespitosum), there are alpine bartsia (Bartsia alpina), alpine butterwort (Pinguicula alpina) and bog-bean (Menyanthes trifoliata).

In the subalpine mat-grass grasslands (Aveno-Nardetum plant community) are found the spring pasqueflower (Pulsatilla vernalis), the alpine pasqueflower (Pulsatilla alpina) and Scheuchzer's bellflower (Campanula scheuchzeri). In the alpine bent sedge grasslands (Caricetum curvulae), there are red-flowered dwarf primula (Primula minima) and sticky primrose (Primula glutinosa). In the coloured fescue grasslands on the south-facing steep slopes, there are the villous primula (Primula villosa, "red spike") in the dark blue flowered form endemic to the northern alps. In the Polsterfluren, Wulf's androsace (Androsace wulfeniana), endemic to the eastern alps, and Wulf's houseleek (Sempervivum wulfenii) grow.

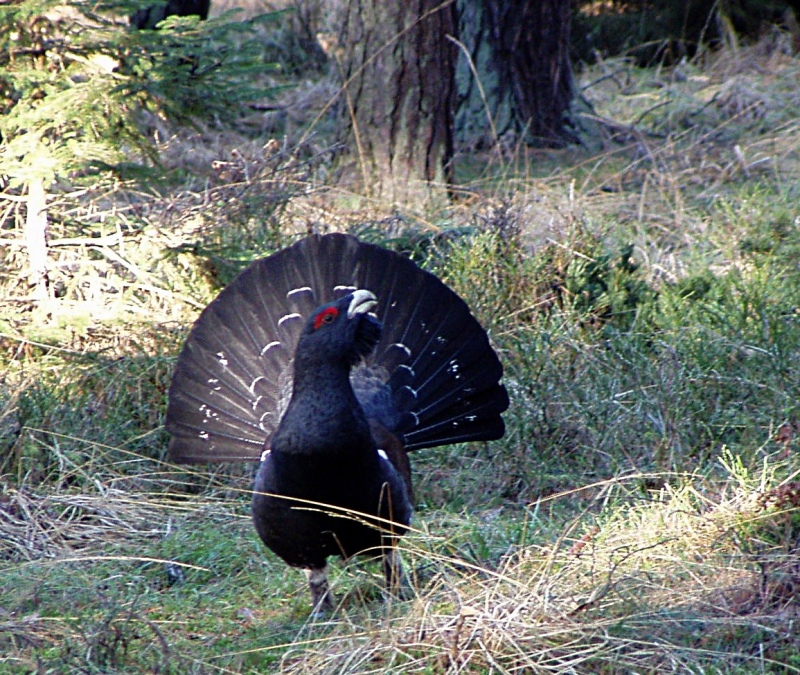
The capercaillie here is the symbolic animal of the adjacent Nationalpark Nockberge

=== Fauna ===
In the region of the Turracher Höhe, the entire spectrum of the Alpine animal world is found, with the exception of the ibex, which was never indigenous here. Besides hoofed game animals (red deer, chamois, roe deer) and the corvids (raven, jackdaw, magpie), there are also four members of the pheasant family (capercaillie, black grouse, willow grouse and hazel grouse) in stable populations. In predatory game animals, there are fox, badger, pine marten, stone marten, European polecat, ermine and least weasel. Birds of prey, such as goshawk, Eurasian sparrowhawk, European kestrel, golden eagle, as well as more rarely Eurasian hobby and peregrine are also seen here. From the nocturnal birds of prey, there are the Eurasian eagle-owl, tawny owl, Tengmalm's owl and Eurasian pygmy-owl. There are also marmots.

=== Carboniferous Period flora of the Stangalpe ===
In the approximately 300 million year old slate from the Carboniferous Period, fossilised plants had already been found in the late 18th century. Scientifically recorded for the first time in 1835 by Ami Boué, there are 72 species of coal forest plants from the Stangalpe known today, among which are the giant horsetails (Calamites), Sigillaria, ferns (Pecopteris), Cordaites and conifers (Dicranophyllum).

== Literature ==
All references are in German.

- A. Fritz, M. Boersma, K. Krainer: Steinkohlenzeitliche Pflanzenfossilien. Carinthia II, Klagenfurt 1990. 189 pp.
- W. J. Jongmans: Die Flora des "Stangalpe"-Gebietes in Steiermark. In: C. R. 2e Congr. Pour l’avancement dea etudes de Stratigraphie Carbonifere, Heerlen 1935. Maestricht 1938, Vol. III, p. 1259–1298.
- Matthias Maierbrugger: Turracherhöhe und Nockalmstrasse. Ein Führer und Ratgeber durch Landschaft und Geschichte. Verlag Johannes Heyn, Klagenfurt 1984, ISBN 3-85366-429-6
- Barbara and Peter Leeb (publ.) / With text by Matthias Maierbrugger. Der Hochschober, die Turracher Höhe und die Nockberge : ein Buch für "Hochschober-Gäste" als Verbindung zwischen Gestern und Heute. Heyn Verlag, Klagenfurt, 2001. [238 pages] ISBN 3-85366-979-4.
- Georg Sterk, Friedrich H Ucik: Die Turracher Höhe. Auf den Spuren der Zeit. Verlag Johannes Heyn, Klagenfurt 2003, ISBN 3-7084-0039-9
