= Hohe Pressing =

Coordinates: 46°56′N 13°42′E

Hohe Pressing is a hill or summit in the Central Eastern Alps. It is 2370 m (7775 ft) high and is one of a subgroup of three peaks in region of the Gurktal Alps, Austria.
