= Falkertsee =

Coordinates: 46.8619°N 13.8282°E

- Location within Kärnten
- Location: Carinthia
- Type: natural freshwater lake
- Basin countries: Austria
- Max. length: 335 metres (1,099 ft)
- Max. width: 215 metres (705 ft)
- Surface area: 4.3179 hectares (10.670 acres)
- Average depth: 5.5 metres (18 ft)
- Max. depth: 13.2 metres (43 ft)
- Water volume: 238.131 cubic metres (62,908 US gal)
- Frozen: part of year

Falkertsee is a lake of Carinthia, Austria.
