= Eisenhut (mountain) =

Mountain in Austria

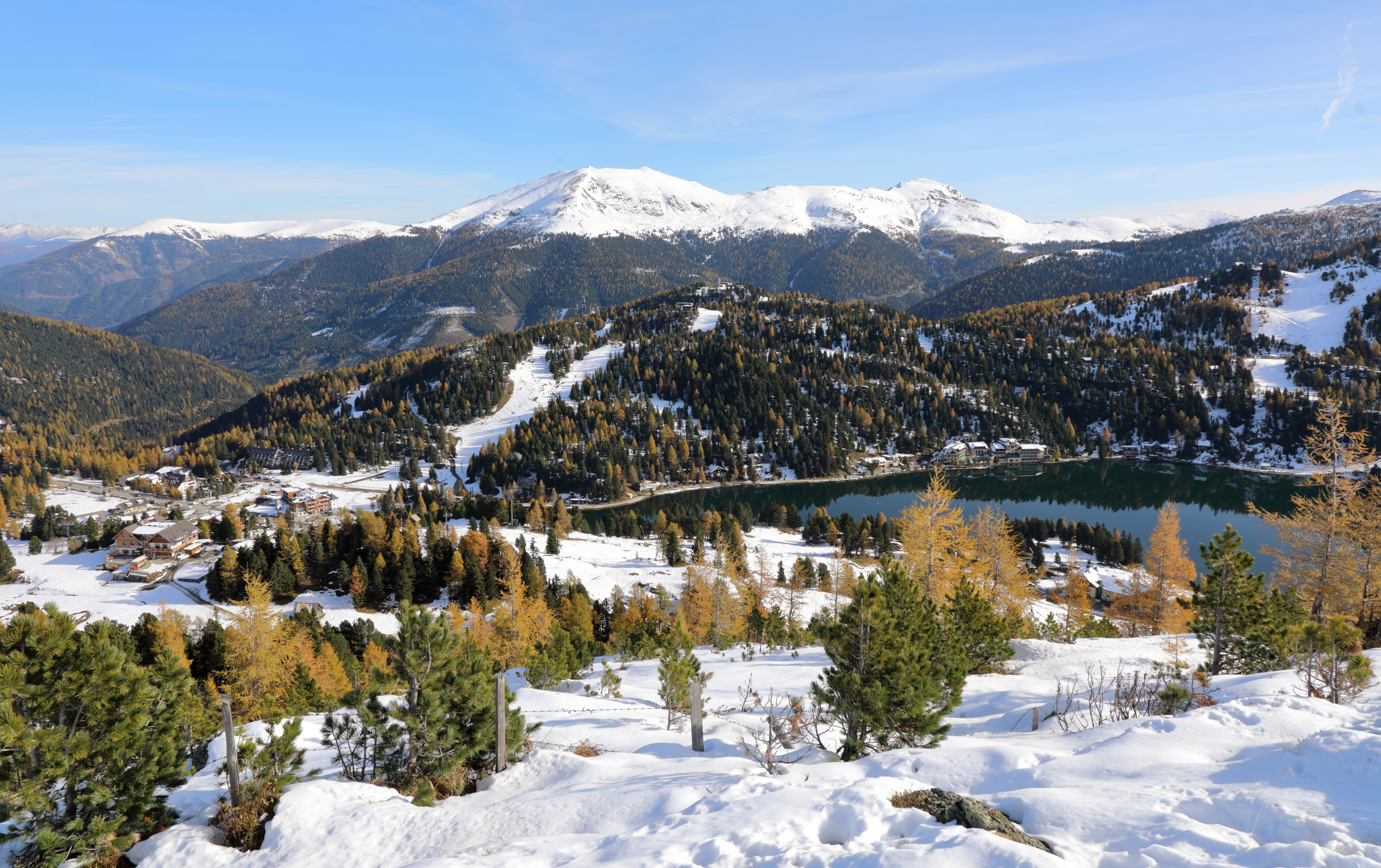
- To the left of centre the Eisenhut and right the Wintertalernock

Highest point
- Elevation: 2,441 m (8,009 ft)
- Prominence: 800 m (2,600 ft)
- Coordinates: 46°57′12″N 13°55′34″E

Geography
- Location within Alps
- Location: Styria, Austria
- Parent range: Carinthian-Styrian Alps; Gurktal Alps

The Eisenhut is a mountain in the Central Eastern Alps located in Austria. At 2,441 metres (8,009 ft), it is the highest peak of the Gurktal Alps and the Carinthian-Styrian Alps.

== Geography ==
It is located northeast of the Turracher Höhe Pass. Administratively the mountain belongs to the Austrian state of Styria, near the tripoint with Carinthia and Salzburg. The name refers to the centuries-long mining for iron (German: Eisen) ore in places like nearby Turrach.
