= Nock Mountains =

Mountain range of the Gurktal Alps in Austria

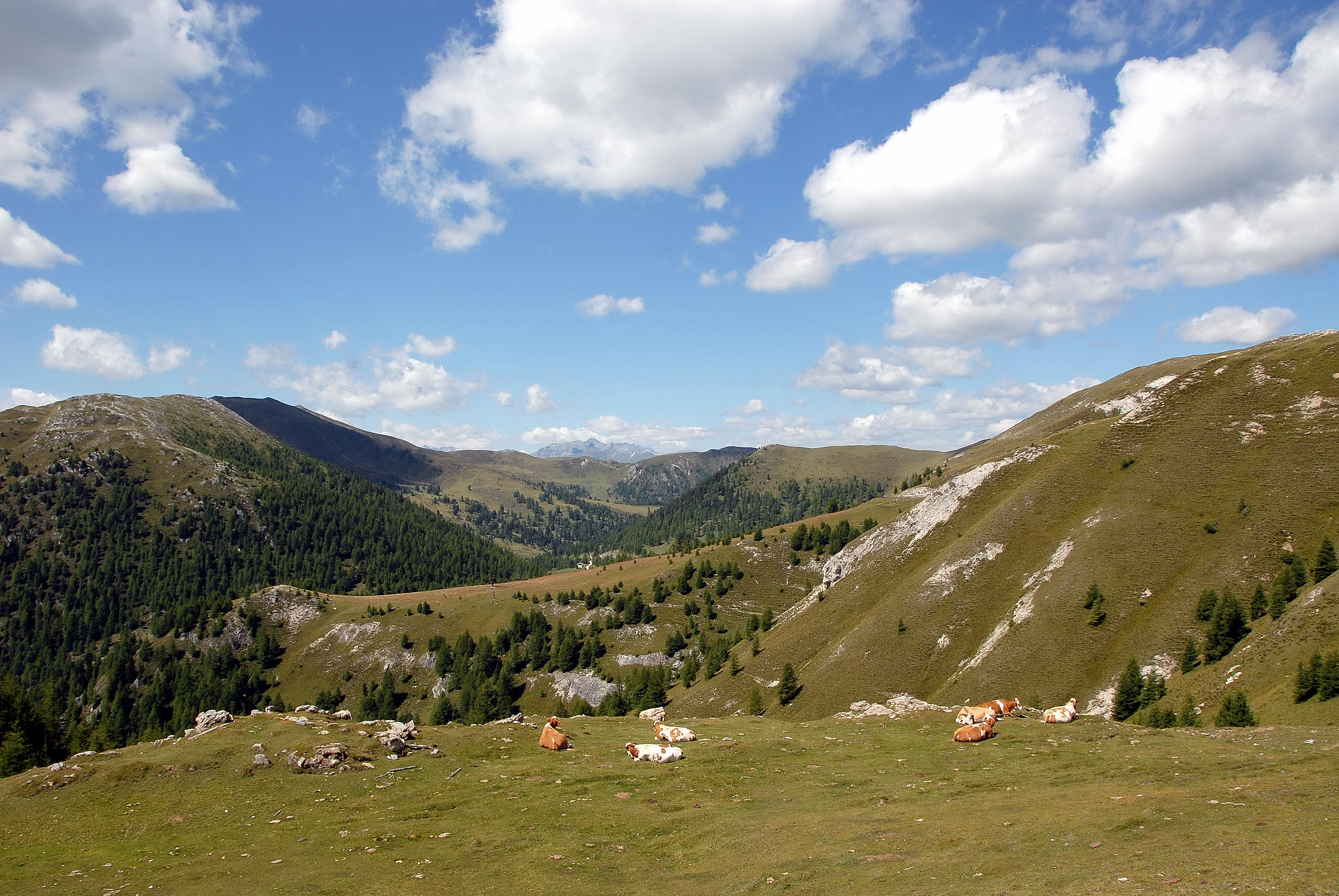
- Alpine landscape in Nock Mountains National Park

Highest point
- Peak: Eisenhut
- Elevation: 2,441 m above sea level (AA)

Dimensions
- Length: 10 km (6.2 mi)

Geography
- Location within Alps
- State(s): Carinthia, Salzburg, Styria
- Range coordinates: 46°54′14″N 13°43′40″E
- Parent range: Gurktal Alps

The Nock Mountains (German: Nockberge or Nockgebirge) are the westernmost and highest mountain range of the Gurktal Alps in Austria, spread over parts of the federal states of Carinthia, Salzburg and Styria. Their appearance is characterised by numerous dome-like and grass-covered summits (Nocken). Their highest peak is the Eisenhut in Styria which reaches an elevation of 2,441 m (8,009 ft) AA.

In July 2012 the Nock Mountains and the adjacent Lungau region were designated a biosphere reserve by UNESCO. They were largely unglaciated in the Ice Age and were a glacial refugium.

== Geography ==
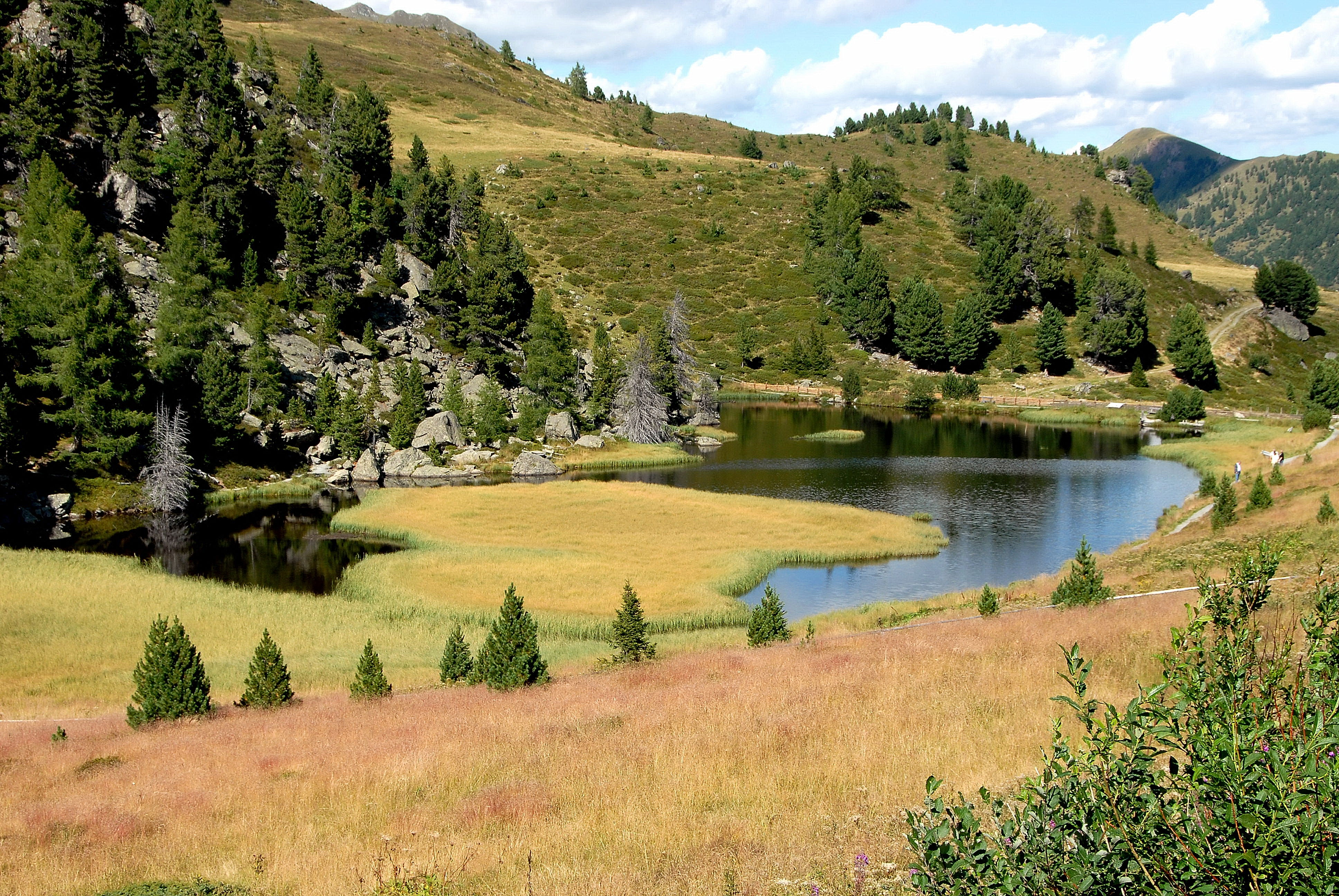
Lake Windeben on the Nockalm Road

As westernmost part of the Gurktal Alps, the Nock Mountains are separated from the Low Tauern in the north, stretching as far as the Katschberg Pass (1,641 m (AA)) in the west, by the Mur River. In the west, the rivers Lieser and Drau separate the Nock Mountains from the Ankogel Group of the High Tauern and from the Gailtal Alps. South of Lake Ossiach they are adjoined by the lower Sattnitz range and the Klagenfurt Basin, another part of the Gurktal Alps. To the east, within the Gurktal Alps they are bounded by a line from Gurk via Flattnitz Pass (1,400 m (AA)) to the Paalbach stream.

The Nock Mountains may be divided into eight subgroups. South of Bad Kleinkirchheim are the stocks of the Mirnock massif (2,110 m (AA)) with a significant topographic prominence of 1,343 m, the Wöllaner Nock (2,145 m (AA)) and the Gerlitzen (1,909 m (AA)) high above Lake Ossiach. The central region of the Nock Mountains is formed by the Millstätter Alpe (2,101 m (AA)) and the Rosennock (2,440 m (AA)), the highest summit in Carinthia. In the north are the stocks of the Schwarzwand (2,241 m (AA)), the Königstuhl (2,406 m (AA)) in Salzburg, which is also a tripoint, and the Eisenhut (2,441 m (AA)).

The range has also been referred to in German language tourist brochures as the "Nocky Mountains", an allusion to the Rocky Mountains.

== National park ==
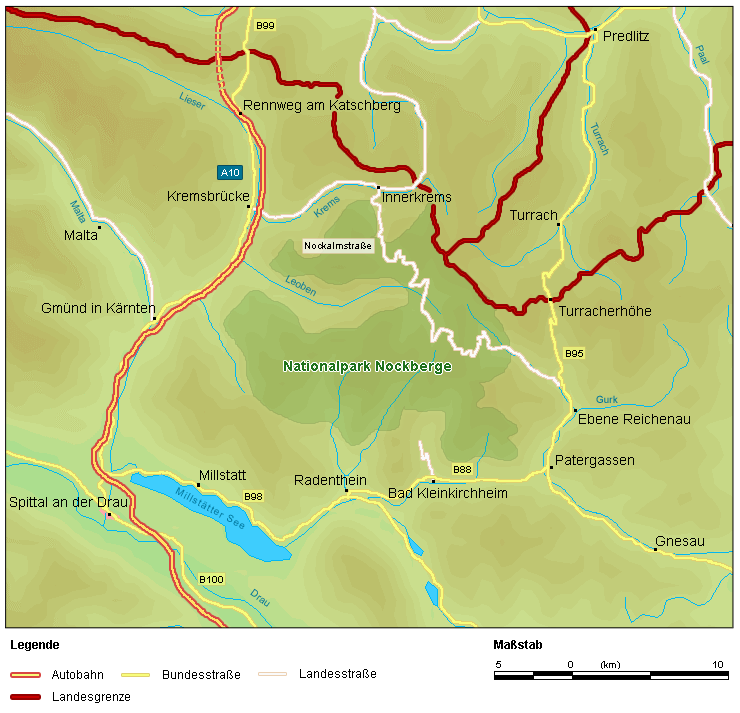
National park map

The central area formed Nock Mountains National Park (German: Nationalpark Nockberge), established by the Carinthian state government on 1 January 1987. The remote area had already been developed with the construction of the scenic Nockalm Road from 1979. Further plans for a skiing region were averted by a citizens' initiative and a referendum in 1980, whereby 94% of the voters declared themselves against the project.

Despite its name, Nock Mountains National Park was designated a protected landscape (Category V) according to IUCN protected area categories. The territory of 184 square kilometres (71 mi^{2}) was entirely located within the Carinthian part of the range, along the border with Salzburg and Styria, stretching from Krems and the Lieser Valley in the west to Reichenau in the east, and down to Bad Kleinkirchheim and Radenthein in the south.
