= Gurktal Alps =

Mountain range in the Central Eastern Alps in Austria

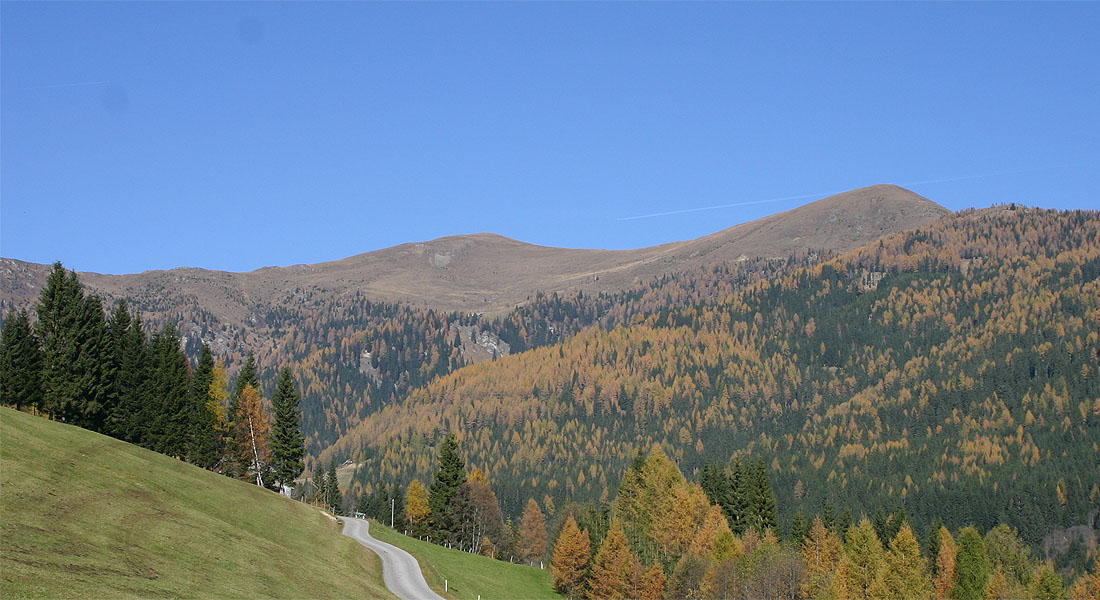
- Wöllaner Nock, 2,145 m (7,037 ft)

Highest point
- Peak: Eisenhut
- Elevation: 2,441 m (8,009 ft)
- Coordinates: 46°57′11″N 13°55′45″E

Geography
- Country: Austria
- States: Carinthia, Styria and Salzburg
- Range coordinates: 46°57′N 13°56′E
- Parent range: Central Eastern Alps; Carinthian-Styrian Alps (Noric Alps)

The Gurktal Alps (German: Gurktaler Alpen, Slovene: Krške Alpe) is a mountain range in the Central Eastern Alps in Austria which is named after the valley of the Gurk river. The range stretches west to Lake Millstatt and east to Neumarkter Sattel (north-northwest of Neumarkt in Steiermark). The highest peak is Eisenhut at 2,441m (8,009 ft).

== Geography ==
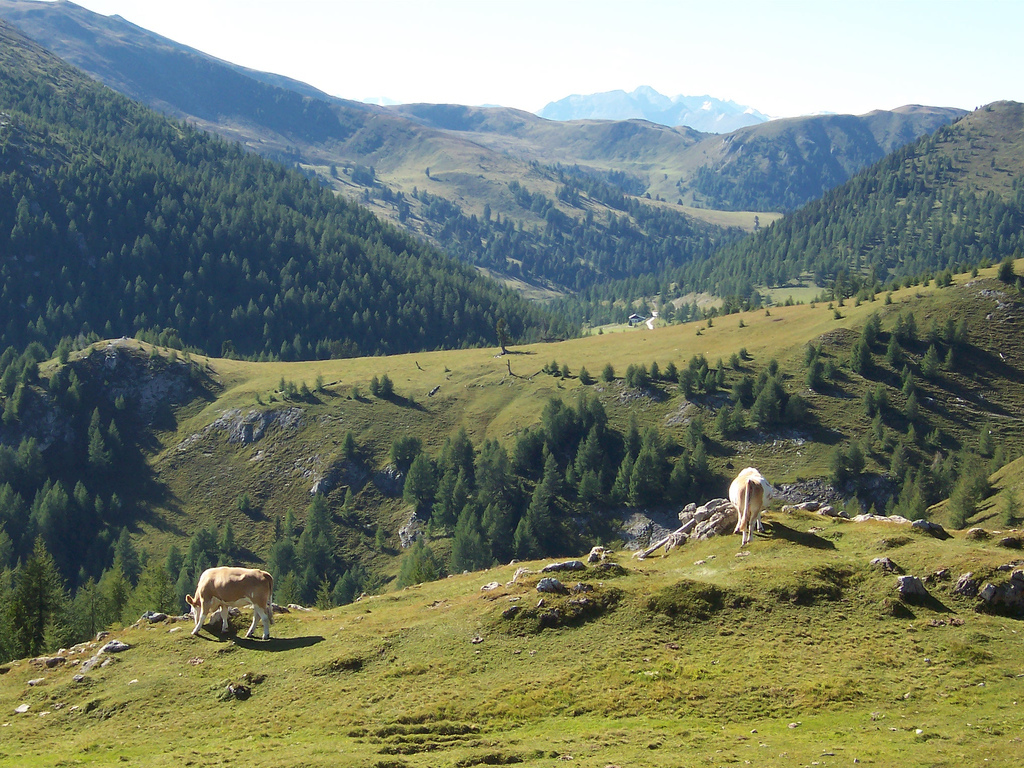
Pastures on Nockalm Road

=== Location ===
The range is located between the Mur Valley to the north (which separates it from the Niedere Tauern range) and the River Drava to the south, where it borders the Gailtal Alps and Karavanke ranges of the Southern Limestone Alps. In the west, the Gurktal Alps reach up to the Katschberg Pass and the Ankogel Group of the Hohe Tauern range. To the east, the Neumarkt Pass in Upper Styria separates it from the adjacent Lavanttal Alps.

=== Subdivisions ===
The Gurktal Alps can be divided into five subgroups:

- The Nock Mountains lie between the Liesertal and Flattnitzer Höhe. Their highest peak is the Eisenhut (2,441 m).
- The Metnitz Mountains lie between the Mur and Metnitz valleys. Their highest peak is the Goldachnock (2,171 m).
- The Mödring Chain lies between the Metnitz and Gurktal valleys. The highest peak is the Dorferecken (1,726 m)
- The Wimitz Mountains lie between the Gurk and Glan valleys through which flows the Wimitz river. Their highest peaks are the Schneebauerberg and the Hocheck (both 1,338 m)

At the southern end of the Gurktal Alps is the Klagenfurt Basin. Here there are seven smaller mountain chains:

- Magdalensberg (Lippekogel, 1,079 m)
- Ossiach Tauern (Taubenbühel 1,069 m)
- Glantal Highlands (Ulrichsberg, 1,022 m)
- Sattnitz (Tanzboden, 929 m)
- Feldkirchen-Moosburg Upland (Freudenberg, 817 m)
- St. Veit Upland (Buchberg, 808 m)
- Maria Saal Upland (Maria Saaler Berg, 746 m)

The Gurktal Alps are, along with the Lavanttal Alps to the east, sometimes classified as part of the Noric Alps. However, this term is not geologically justified.

=== Peaks ===
The highest peaks are located within the Nock Mountains (Nockberge, from Nock meaning "rounded hilltop", cf. Nockerl) subgroup west of Flattnitz Pass, including Mt. Eisenhut, 2,441 m (8,009 ft), in the province of Styria. The Nationalpark Nockberge located along the scenic Nockalm Road in Carinthia has been a protected landscape area (IUCN V) since 1987. The Nock Mountains also stretch down to major Carinthian lakes such as the Millstätter See and Ossiacher See.

Other peaks include:

- Großer Rosennock, 2,440 m (8,010 ft)
- Hohe Pressing, 2,370 m (7,780 ft)
- Rinsennock, 2,334 m (7,657 ft)

== Geology ==
The Gurktal Alps consist mainly of three nappes: at the bottom, the "mica schist nappe", in the middle the "Murau nappe", and the "Stolzalpen nappe" at the top.

The lowest nappe is made of mica schist, the middle nappe is made of greenschist, phyllite, and marble. The top nappe, the Stolzalpen nappe, consisted of slates of originally similar age, but which have been transformed and now appear with clay slates, volcanic rocks, and limestone.

== Economy and tourism ==
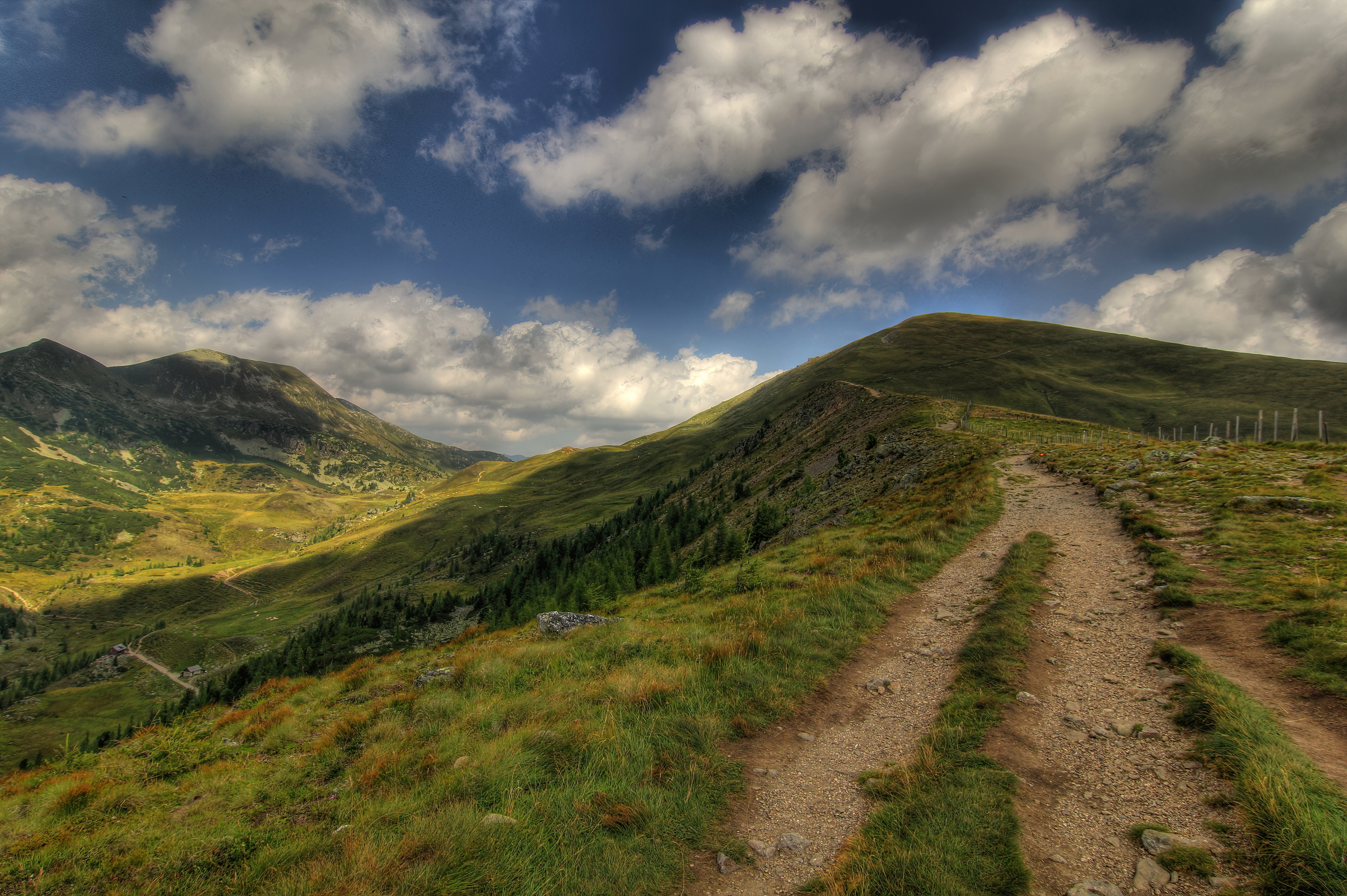
Hiking trail near Bad Kleinkirchheim

The landscape has numerous mountain pastures and was the site of transhumance agriculture. The Gurktal Alps were also a mining area for iron and silver. Magnesite deposits are still being exploited near Radenthein.

Tourism is the now most important economic sector. The valleys of the Gurktal Alps cater for tourists in summer and winter. The leading tourist area is Bad Kleinkirchheim, followed by Turracher Höhe (Predlitz-Turrach and Reichenau), Falkert (Reichenau), Innerkrems (Krems in Kärnten), Flattnitz, Afritz and Katschberg (Rennweg am Katschberg). The largest ski areas are Katschberg-Aineck, Innerkrems-Schönfeld-Karneralm, Turracher Höhe and Gerlitzen in the Nock Mountains and Kreischberg in the Metnitz Mountains.

The Nock Mountain region is well known for its spas. The Karlbad along the Nockalmstraße is the oldest farmers' healing spring in Austria. The method of creating the baths (with spring water and hot rocks) has remained unchanged since the 17th century.
