= Predlitz-Turrach =

- Former municipality
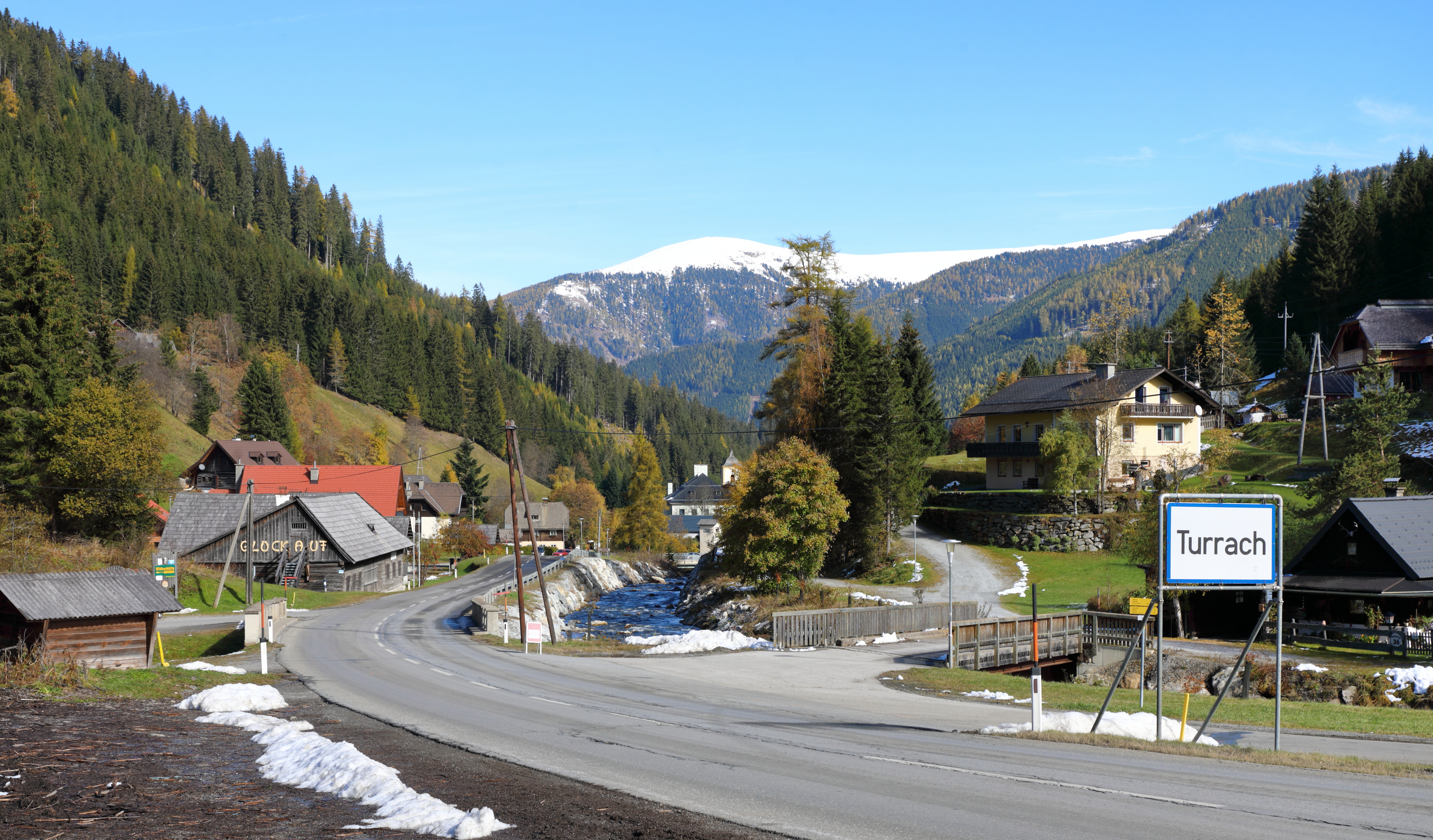
- View of Turrach

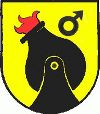
- Coat of arms

- Location within Austria
- Coordinates: 47°04′00″N 13°55′00″E
- Country: Austria
- State: Styria
- District: Murau

Area
  - Total: 150.12 km^{2} (57.96 sq mi)
- Elevation: 971 m (3,186 ft)

Population (1 January 2016)
  - Total: 822
  - Density: 5.48/km^{2} (14.2/sq mi)
- Time zone: UTC+1 (CET)
  - Summer (DST): UTC+2 (CEST)
- Postal code: 8863
- Area code: 03534
- Vehicle registration: MU
- Website: www.predlitz-turrach.steiermark.at

Predlitz-Turrach is a former municipality in the district of Murau in Styria, Austria. Since the 2015 Styria municipal structural reform, it is part of the municipality Stadl-Predlitz.

== Geography ==
The municipality lies in the upper valley of the Mur in the Gurktal Alps.
