= Carnic and Gailtal Alps =

Grouping of mountain ranges in Austria and Italy

- Italian: Alpi Carniche e della Gail; German: Karnische und Gailtaler Alpen
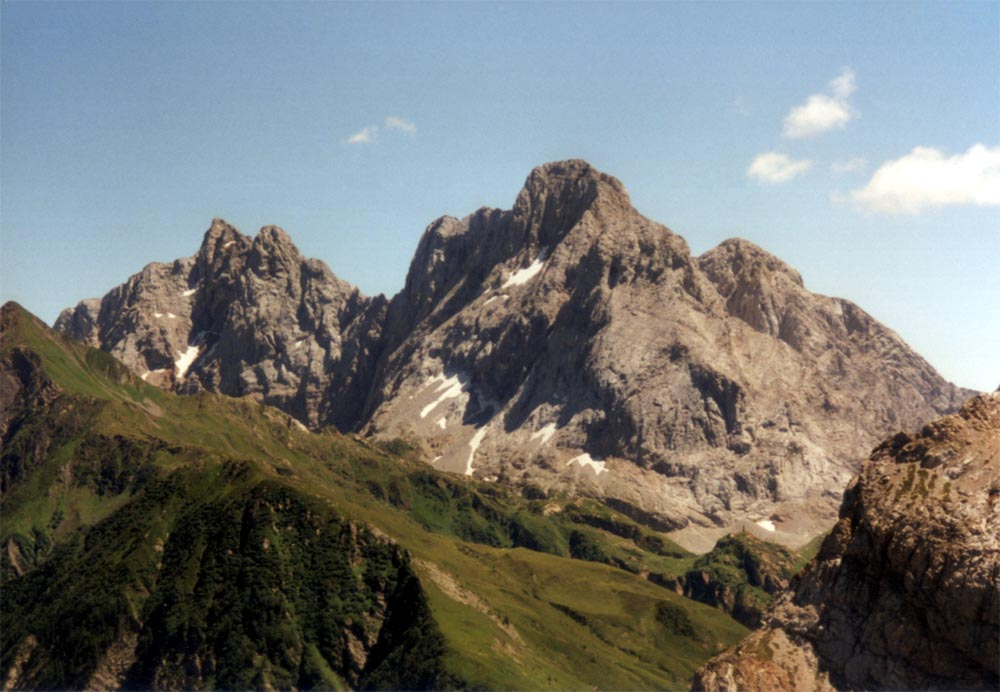
- Hohe Warte/ Monte Coglians, the highest summit of the range, on the right, and Kellerspitzen on the left, viewed from the northwest.

Highest point
- Peak: Coglians
- Elevation: 2,780 m (9,120 ft)
- Coordinates: 46°36′25″N 12°52′56″E

Geography
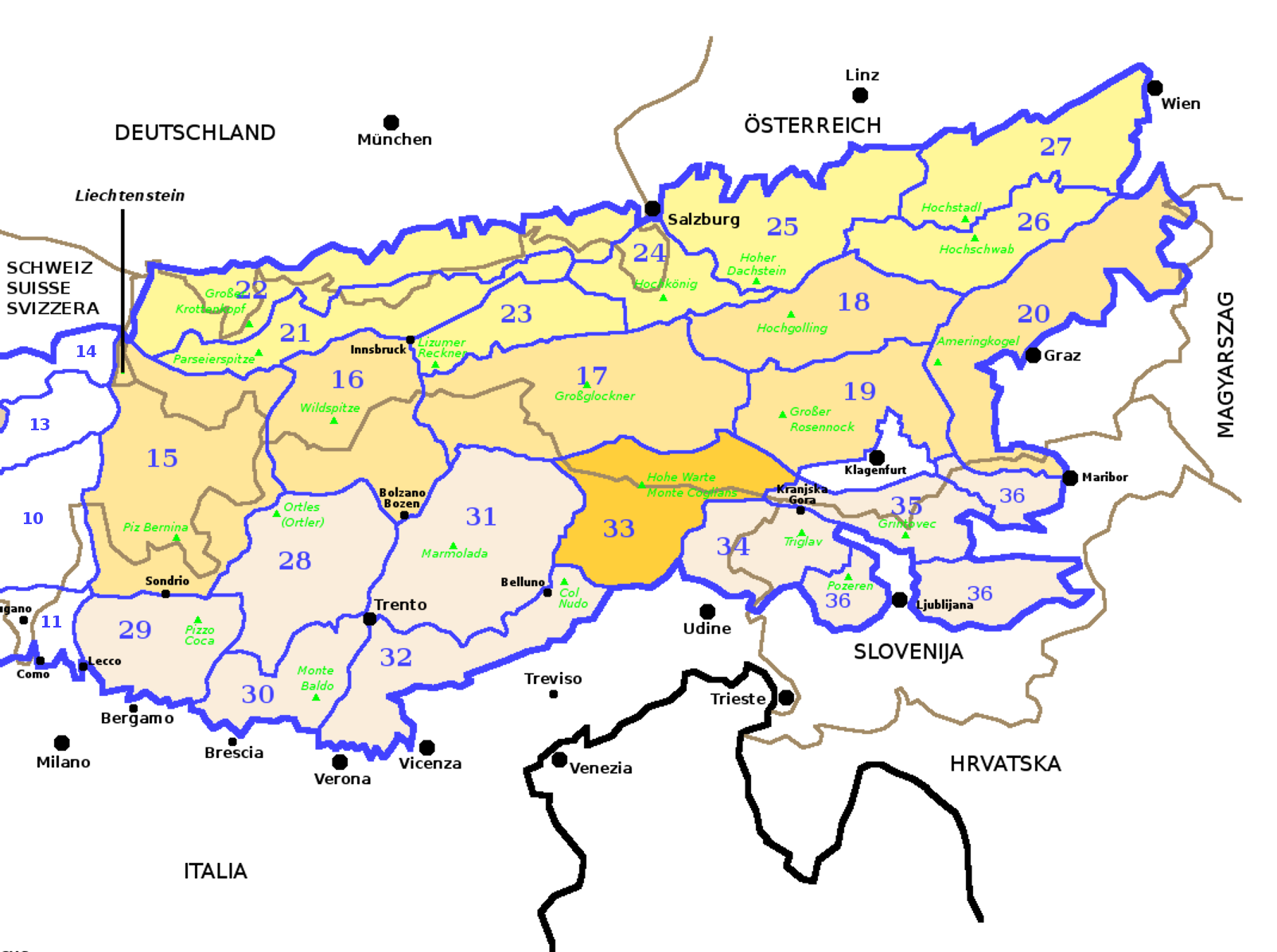
- Carnic and Gailtal Alps (33) within the Eastern Alps
- Countries: Austria and Italy
- States: Tyrol, Carinthia and Friuli-Venezia Giulia
- Parent range: Southern Limestone Alps
- Borders on: Venetian Prealps, Dolomites, Western Tauern Alps, Carinthian-Styrian Alps, Carinthian-Slovenian Alps, Julian Alps and Prealps and Venetian Plain

Geology
- Orogeny: Alpine orogeny

The Carnic and Gailtal Alps (Italian: Alpi Carniche e della Gail, German: Karnische und Gailtaler Alpen) is a geographic grouping of mountain ranges belonging to the Southern Limestone Alps. They are located in Austria and Italy.

== Geography ==
The range is bound by the Drau River in the north, separating it from the Western Tauern section of the Central Eastern Alps. The northern, entirely Austrian range is called the Gailtal Alps or Drauzug, bordered by the Gail River in the south. The Gail Valley is on the Periadriatic Seam, so that from a tectonic perspective the Gailtal Alps belong to the Central Eastern Alps. The Gailtal Alps are divided by the very deep Gailbergsattel (981 m) into a higher western section called the Lienzer Dolomites and a lower eastern section, to which the name Gailtal Alps is sometimes restricted. Passes in the eastern section include the Kreuzbergsattel and Windische Höhe.

The main ridge of the Carnic Alps forms the Austrian-Italian border and stretches from prominent Mt. Helm near Sexten at the tripoint of East Tyrol, South Tyrol and Veneto to the Canal Valley at Tarvisio in the east. It includes several peaks reaching nearly 2,800 m (9,200 ft) as well as the Plöcken and Naßfeld passes.

In the south, the Carnic Prealps stretch between the Piave and Tagliamento rivers down to the Padan Plain.

Administratively, the range is divided between the Italian Region of Friuli-Venezia Giulia, and the Austrian states Tyrol and Carinthia.

=== SOIUSA classification ===
According to SOIUSA (International Standardized Mountain Subdivision of the Alps), the Carnic and Gailtal Alps are an Alpine section, classified in the following way:

- main part = Eastern Alps
- major sector = Southern Limestone Alps
- section = Carnic and Gailtal Alps
- code = II/C-33

=== Subdivision ===
The Carnic and Gailtal Alps are divided into three subsections:

- Carnic Alps (IT: Alpi Carniche; DE: Karnischer Hauptkamm) - SOIUSA code:II/C-33.I;
- Gailtal Alps (DE: Gailtaler Alpen or Drauzug) - SOIUSA code:II/C-33.II;
- Carnic Prealps (IT: Prealpi Carniche) - SOIUSA code:II/C-33.III.

== Notable summits ==
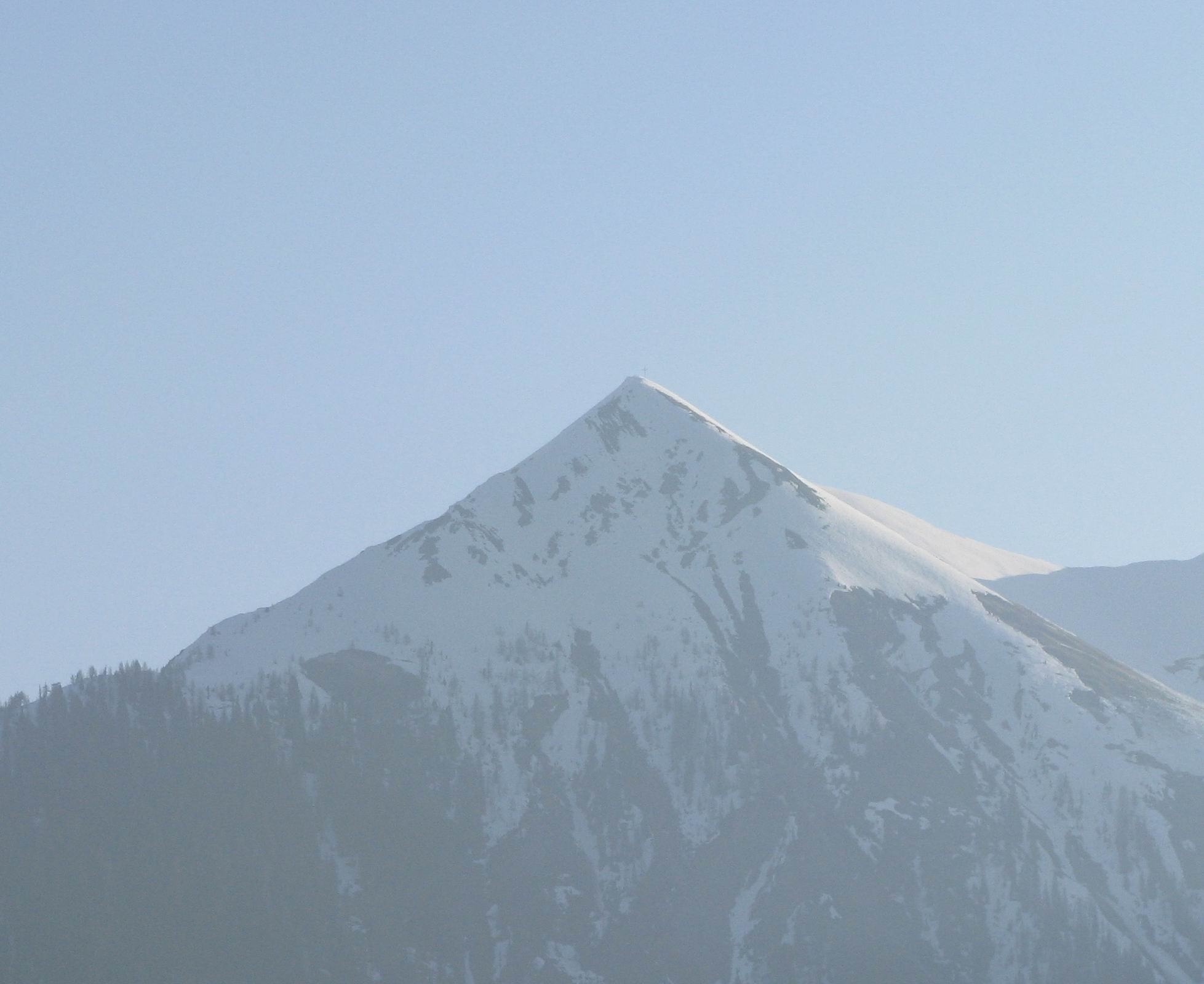
Mount Lumkofel (2,287 m), in the Gailtal Alps

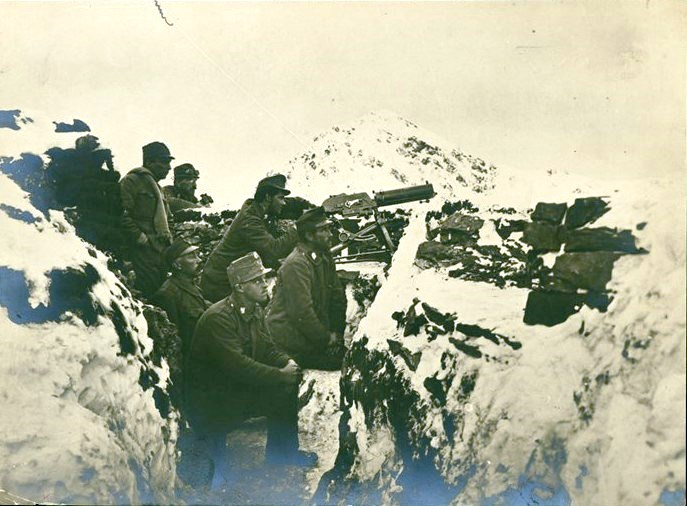
WWI. Austro-Hungarian machine gun team at Mount Gamskofel, c.1916

Some notable summits of the range are:

Name	metres	subsection
Coglians / Hohe Warte	2,782	Carnic Alps
Kellerspitzen / Creta delle Chianevate	2,774	Carnic Alps
Große Sandspitze	2,770	Lienzer Dolomites
Spitzkofel	2,717	Lienzer Dolomites
Cima dei Preti	2,703	Carnic Prealps
Monte Peralba	2,694	Carnic Alps
Monte Cavallino / Große Kinigat	2,689	Carnic Alps
Hochstadel	2,681	Lienzer Dolomites
Monte Duranno	2,668	Carnic Prealps
Rosskopf	2,603	Carnic Alps
Zwölferspitz	2,592	Carnic Alps
Eggenkofel	2,591	Lienzer Dolomites
Monte Terza Grande	2,586	Carnic Alps
Monte Cridola	2,581	Carnic Prealps
Hochspitz	2,581	Carnic Alps
Torrione dei Longerin	2,571	Carnic Alps
Wolayer Seekopf	2,551	Carnic Alps
Monte Brentoni	2,548	Carnic Alps
Cima Monfalcon di Montanaia	2,548	Carnic Prealps
Gamskofel	2,526	Carnic Alps
Steinwand	2,520	Carnic Alps
Monte Chiadenis	2,459	Carnic Prealps
Gamswiesenspitze	2,486	Lienzer Dolomites
Helm	2,434	Carnic Alps
Reißkofel	2,371	Gailtal Alps
Lumkofel	2,287	Gailtal Alps
Trogkofel / Creta di Aip	2,195	Carnic Alps
Jauken	2,276	Gailtal Alps
Gartnerkofel	2,195	Carnic Alps
Dobratsch	2,166	Gailtal Alps (Villach Alps)
