= Carinthian–Slovenian Alps =

- Slovene: Koroško–Slovenske Alpe; German: Kärntnerisch–Slowenische Alpen
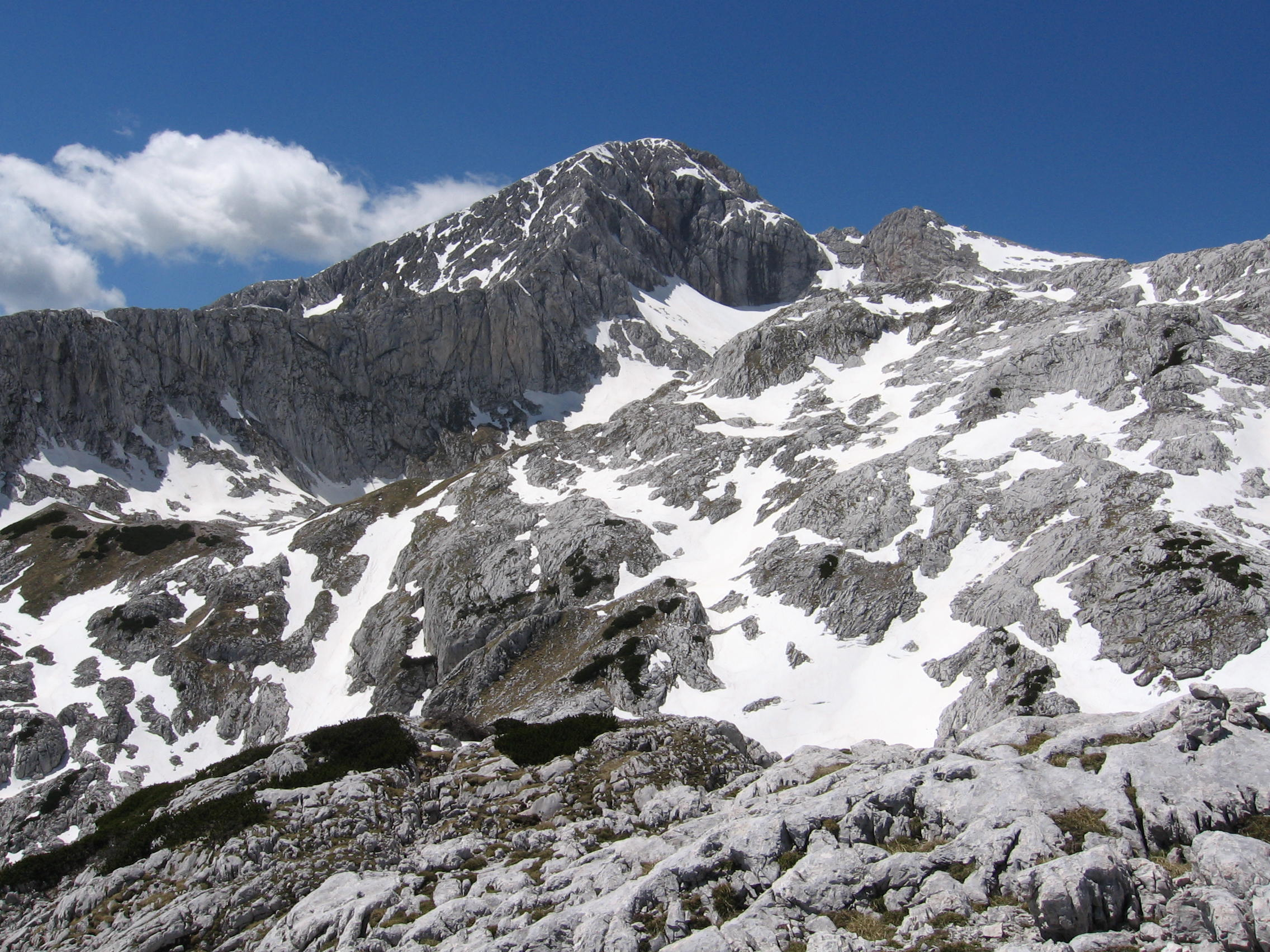
- Mount Grintovec (2,558 m)

Highest point
- Peak: Grintovec
- Elevation: 2,558 m (8,392 ft)
- Coordinates: 46°21′25″N 14°32′10″E

Geography
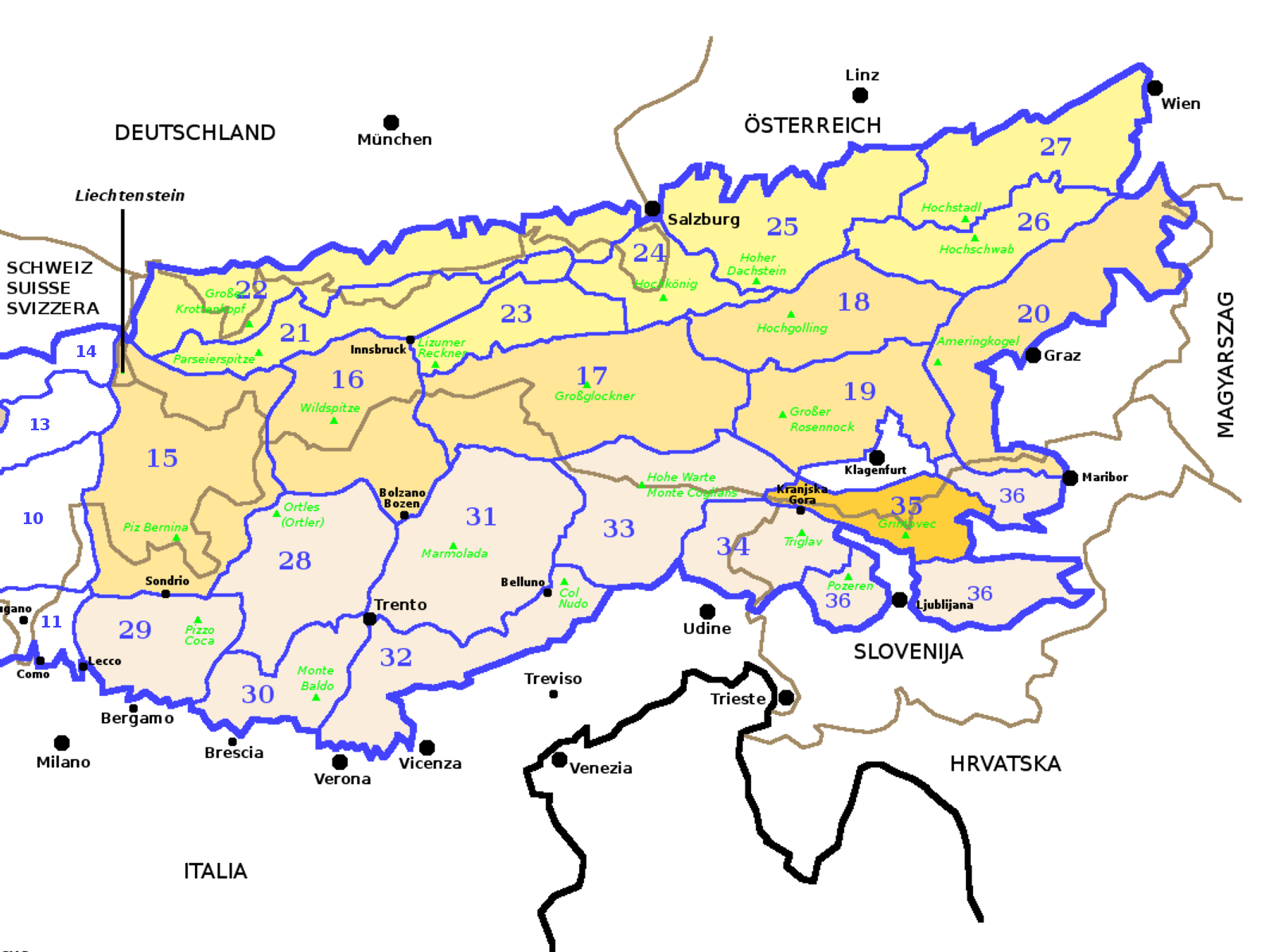
- Carinthian–Slovenian Alps (section no. 35) within the Eastern Alps
- Countries: Slovenia, Austria and Italy
- Parent range: Alps
- Borders on: Carnic and Gailtal Alps, Julian Alps and Prealps and Slovenian Prealps

Geology
- Orogeny: Alpine orogeny

The Carinthian–Slovenian Alps (Slovene: Koroško–Slovenske Alpe; German: Kärntnerisch–Slowenische Alpen) are a mountain range in the eastern part of the Alps. They are located in Slovenia, Austria and, for a very small area in westernmost part of the range, in Italy.

== Geography ==
The range belongs to the drainage basin of the Danube River.

=== SOIUSA classification ===
According to SOIUSA (International Standardized Mountain Subdivision of the Alps) the Carinthian–Slovenian Alps are an Alpine section, classified in the following way:

- main part = Eastern Alps
- major sector = Southern Limestone Alps
- section = Carinthian–Slovenian Alps
- code = II/C-35

=== Subdivision ===
The Carinthian–Slovenian Alps are divided in two subsections:

- Karawanks (SL: Karavanke; DE: Karawanken) - SOIUSA code:II/C-35.I;
- Kamnik–Savinja Alps (SL: Kamniško-Savinjske Alpe; DE: Steiner Alpen) - SOIUSA code:II/C-35.II.

== Notable summits ==
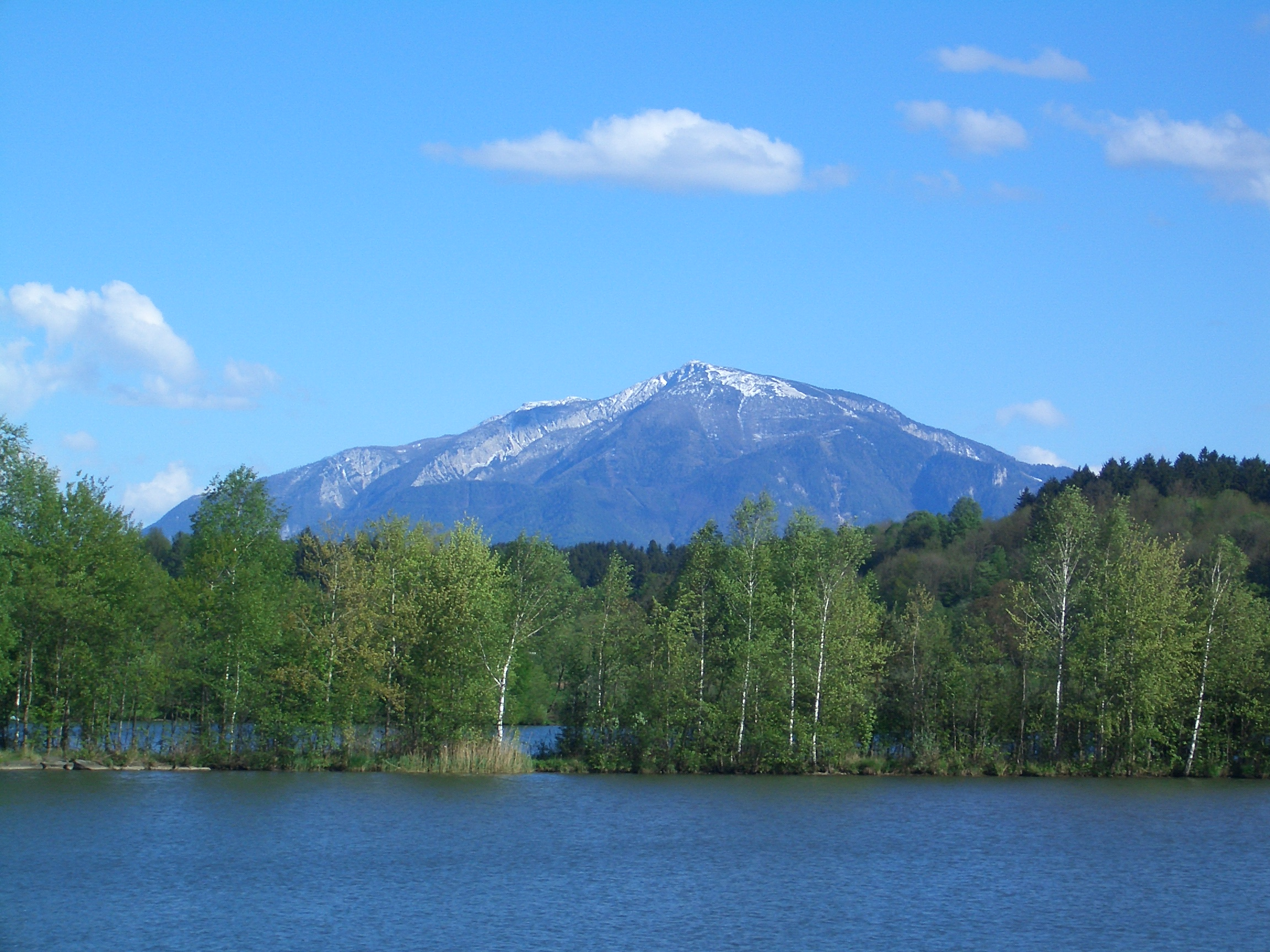
Mount Peca (2,125 m), in the eastern Karawanks range

Some notable summits of the Carinthian–Slovenian Alps are:

Name	metres	feet
Grintovec / Grintavec	2,588	8,392
Skuta	1,836	6,024
Veliki Stol / Hochstuhl	2,532	8,307
Kepa / Mittagskogel	2,139	7,018
Golica / Kahlkogel	1,836	6,024
Peca / Petzen	2,125	6,971
