= Monfalcon di Montanaia =

Mountain in Italy

- Cima Monfalcon di Montanaia
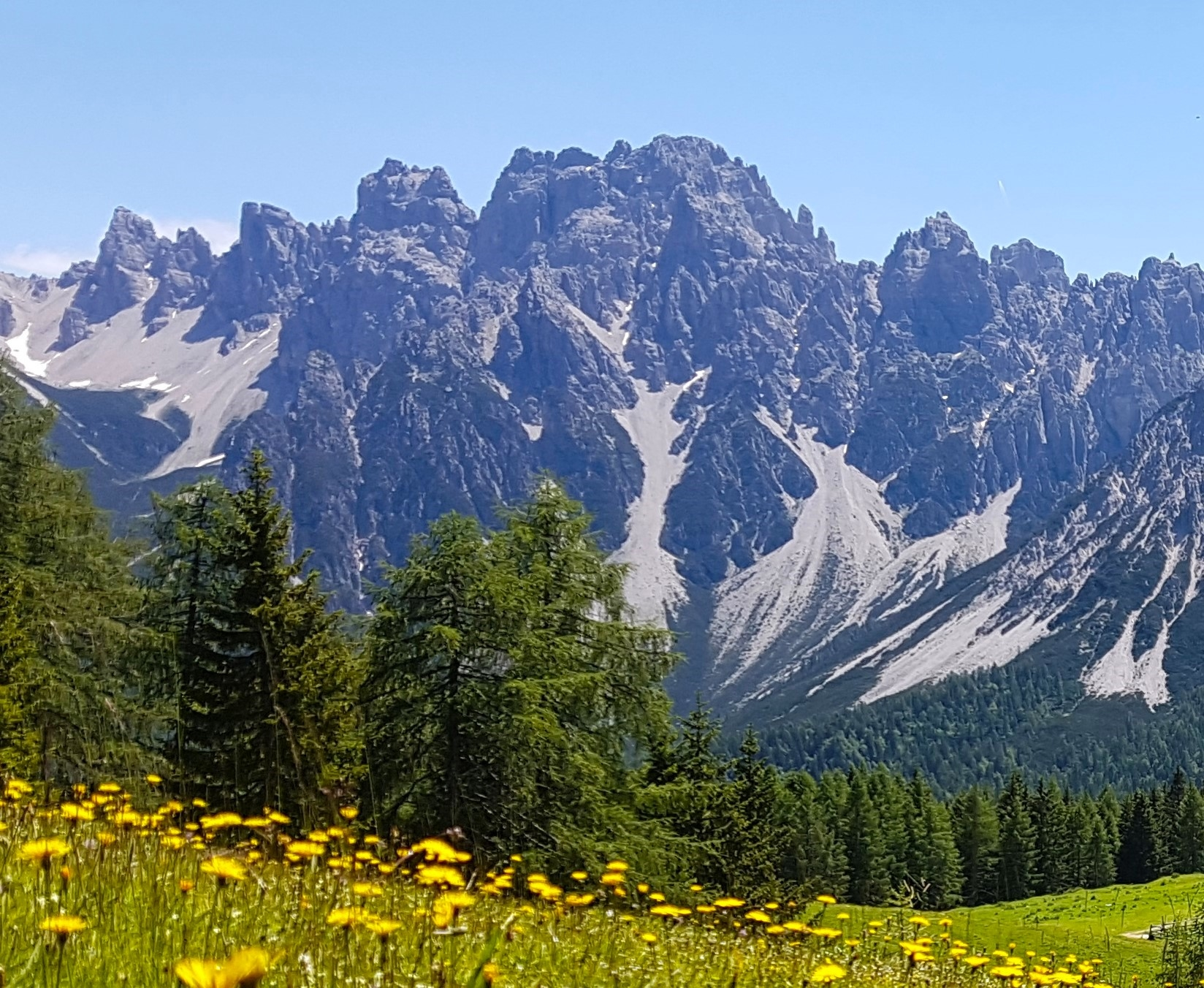
- West aspect

Highest point
- Elevation: 2,548 m (8,360 ft)
- Prominence: 506 m (1,660 ft)
- Parent peak: Monte Cridola
- Isolation: 2.45 km (1.52 mi)
- Listing: Prominent mountains of the Alps
- Coordinates: 46°24′14″N 12°29′10″E

Naming
- Etymology: Falcon Peak

Geography
- Location within Italy Location within Alps
- Country: Italy
- Region: Friuli-Venezia Giulia / Veneto
- Protected area: Friulian Dolomites Natural Park
- Parent range: Alps; Carnic and Gailtal Alps; Carnic Alps
- Topo map: Tabacco 021 Dolomiti di Sinistra Piave

Climbing
- First ascent: 1891

Monfalcon di Montanaia is a mountain on the shared boundary between the Province of Belluno and the Province of Pordenone in northeast Italy.

== Description ==
Monfalcon di Montanaia, or Cima Monfalcon di Montanaia, is a 2,548-meter-elevation (8,360-foot) summit in the Carnic and Gailtal Alps which are a subrange of the Alps. Set on the boundary shared by the Friuli-Venezia Giulia and Veneto regions, the mountain is located eight kilometers (5 miles) east-southeast of the municipality of Pieve di Cadore and is situated on the boundary of Friulian Dolomites Natural Park. Precipitation runoff from the mountain's northwest slope drains to Cadore Lake on the Piave, whereas the other slopes drain into tributaries of the Livenza. Topographic relief is significant as the summit rises 1,370 meters (4,495 feet) above the Meluzzo Valley in approximately two kilometers (1.24 miles). The nearest higher mountain is Monte Cridola, 2.4 kilometers (1.5 miles) to the north. The first ascent of Monfalcon di Montanaia was accomplished on August 4, 1891, by Arturo Ferrucci, Fabio Luzzatto, Alessandro Giordani (guide), with porters Giovanni Maria Martini and Luigi Bressa. The toponym translates as "Falcon Mountain of the Mountainous area."

== Climate ==
Based on the Köppen climate classification, Monfalcon di Montanaia is located in an alpine climate zone with long, cold winters, and short, mild summers. Weather systems are forced upwards by the mountains (orographic lift), causing moisture to drop in the form of rain and snow. The months of July and August offer the most favorable weather for visiting or climbing this mountain.

== See also ==
- Geography of the Alps
