= Julian Alps and Prealps =

- Slovene: Julijske Alpe v širšem smislu Italian: Alpi e Prealpi Giulie
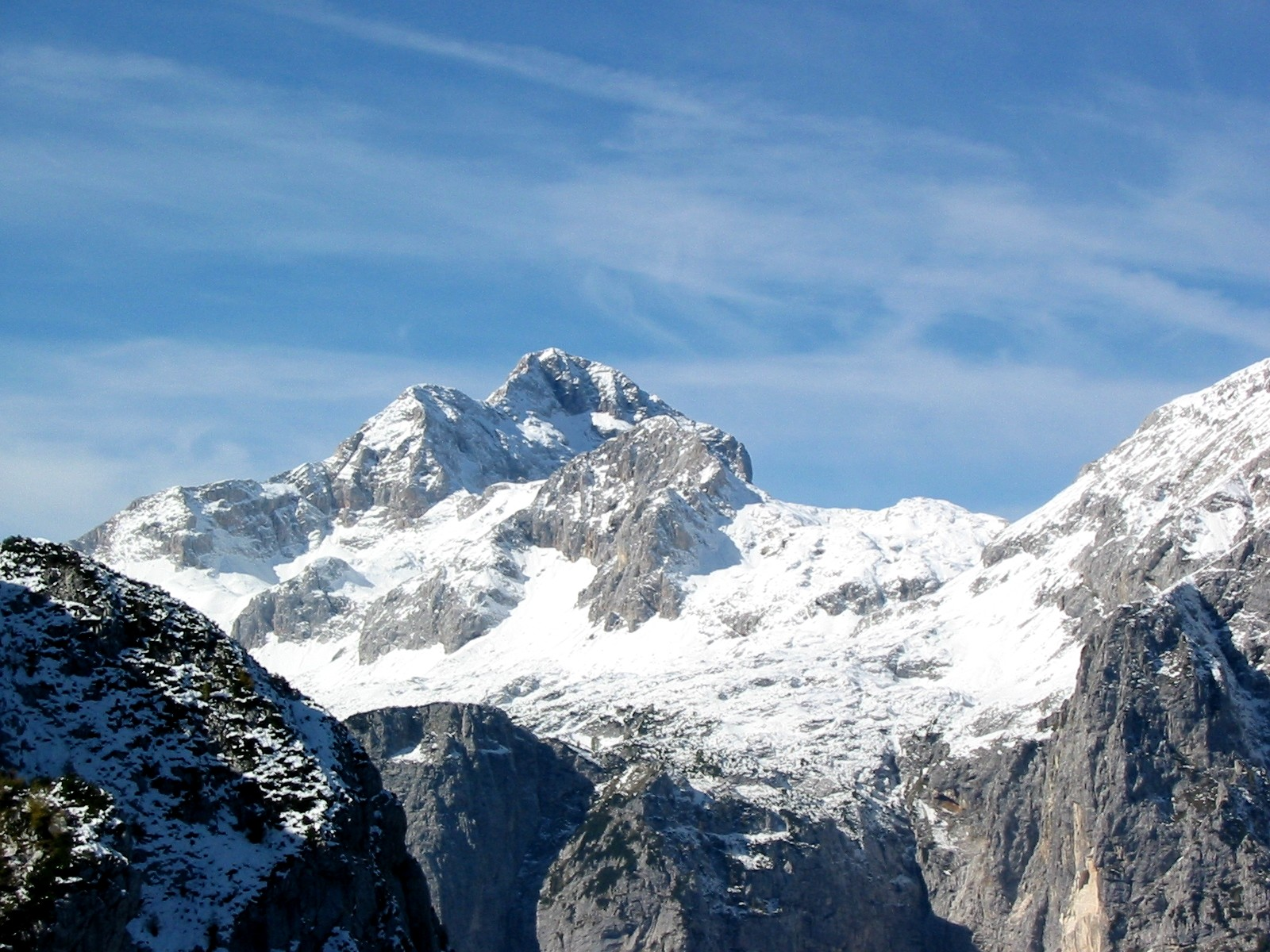
- Mount Triglav, the highest summit of the range

Highest point
- Peak: Triglav
- Elevation: 2,864 m (9,396 ft)
- Coordinates: 46°23′00″N 13°53′00″E

Geography
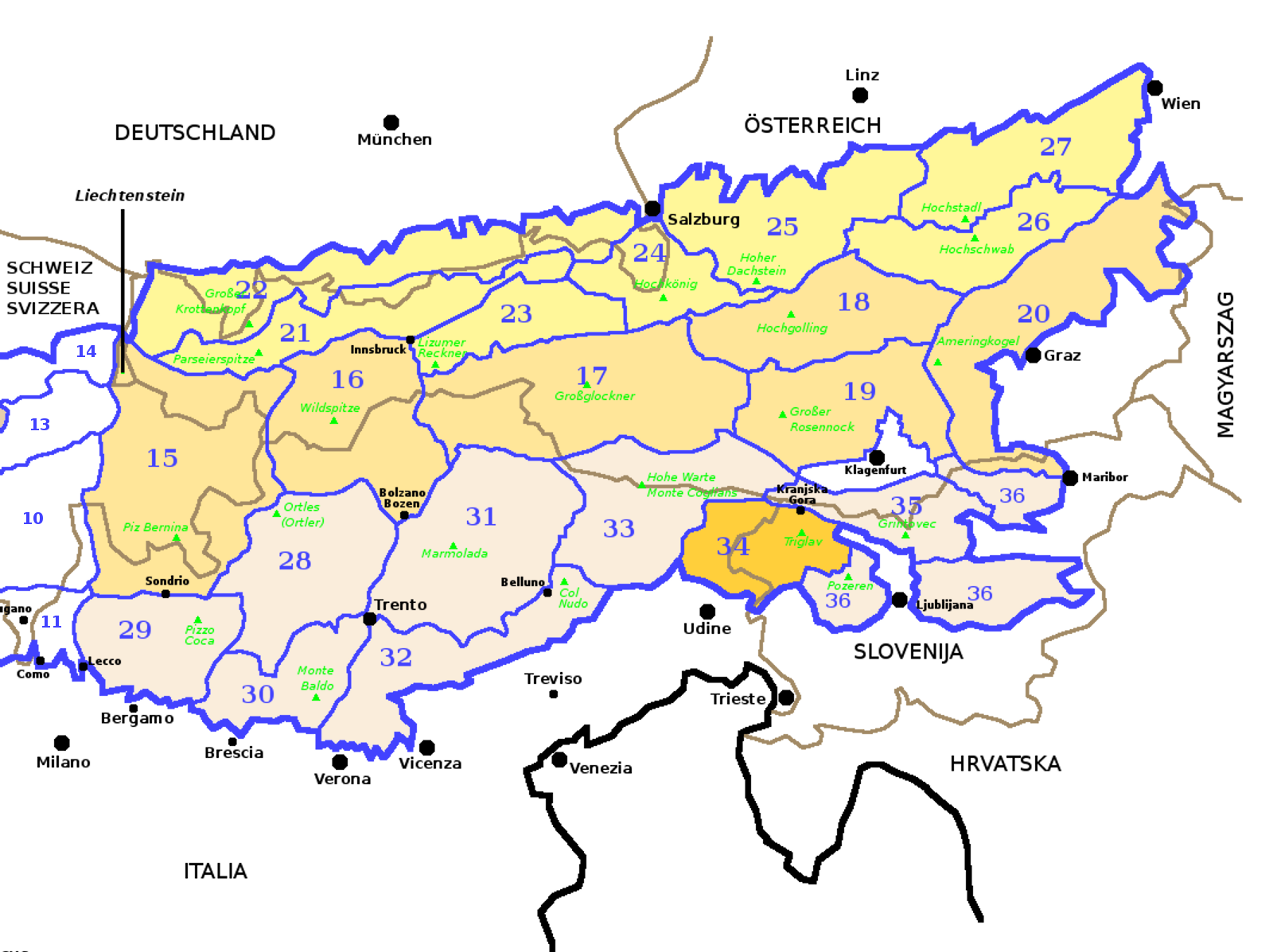
- Julian Alps and Prealps (section no. 34) within the Eastern Alps
- Countries: Slovenia and Italy
- Parent range: Alps
- Borders on: Slovenian Prealps, Carnic and Gailtal Alps, Julian Alps, Dinaric Alps and Venetian Plain

Geology
- Orogeny: Alpine orogeny

The Julian Alps and Prealps (in Slovenian Julijske Alpe v širšem smislu, in Italian Alpi e Prealpi Giulie) are a mountain range in the eastern part of the Alps. They are located in Slovenia and in Italy.

== Geography ==
=== SOIUSA classification ===
According to SOIUSA (International Standardized Mountain Subdivision of the Alps) the Julian Alps and Prealps are an Alpine section, classified in the following way:

- main part = Eastern Alps
- major sector = Southern Limestone Alps
- section = Julian Alps
- code = II/C-34

=== Subdivision ===
The range are divided in two subsections:

- Julian Alps (SL: Julijskih Alp; IT: Alpi Giulie) - SOIUSA code:II/C-34.I;
- Julian Prealps (SL: Julijske Predalpe; IT: Prealpi Giulie) - SOIUSA code:II/C-34.II.

== Notable summits ==
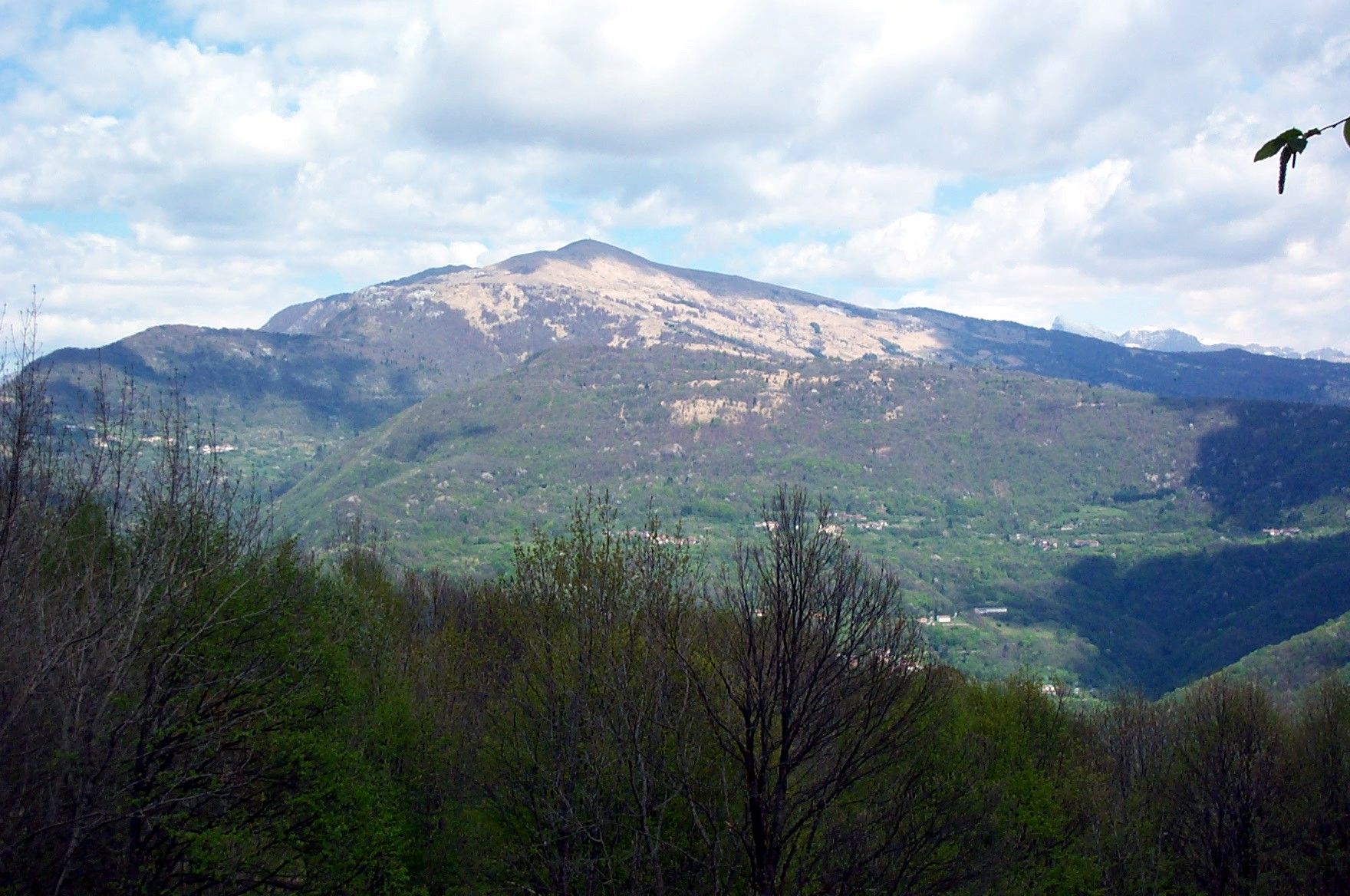
Mount Matajur (on the right), in the Julian Prealps

Some notable summits of the Julian Alps and Prealps are:

| Name | metres | feet |
|---|---|---|
| Triglav | 2,864 | 9,396 |
| Jôf di Montasio | 2,755 | 9,039 |
| Škrlatica | 2,740 | 8,990 |
| Mangart | 2,679 | 8,789 |
| Jalovec | 2,645 | 8,678 |
| Razor | 2,601 | 8,533 |
| Kanin / Canin | 2,582 | 8,471 |
| Prisojnik | 2,546 | 8,353 |
| Rjavina | 2,532 | 7,651 |
| Špik | 2,472 | 8,100 |
| Monte Plauris | 1,958 | 6,422 |
| Cima Musi | 1,878 | 6,160 |
| Monte Cadin | 1,818 | 5,963 |
| Matajur / Baba | 1,643 | 5,389 |
