= Crode dei Longerin =

Mountain in Italy

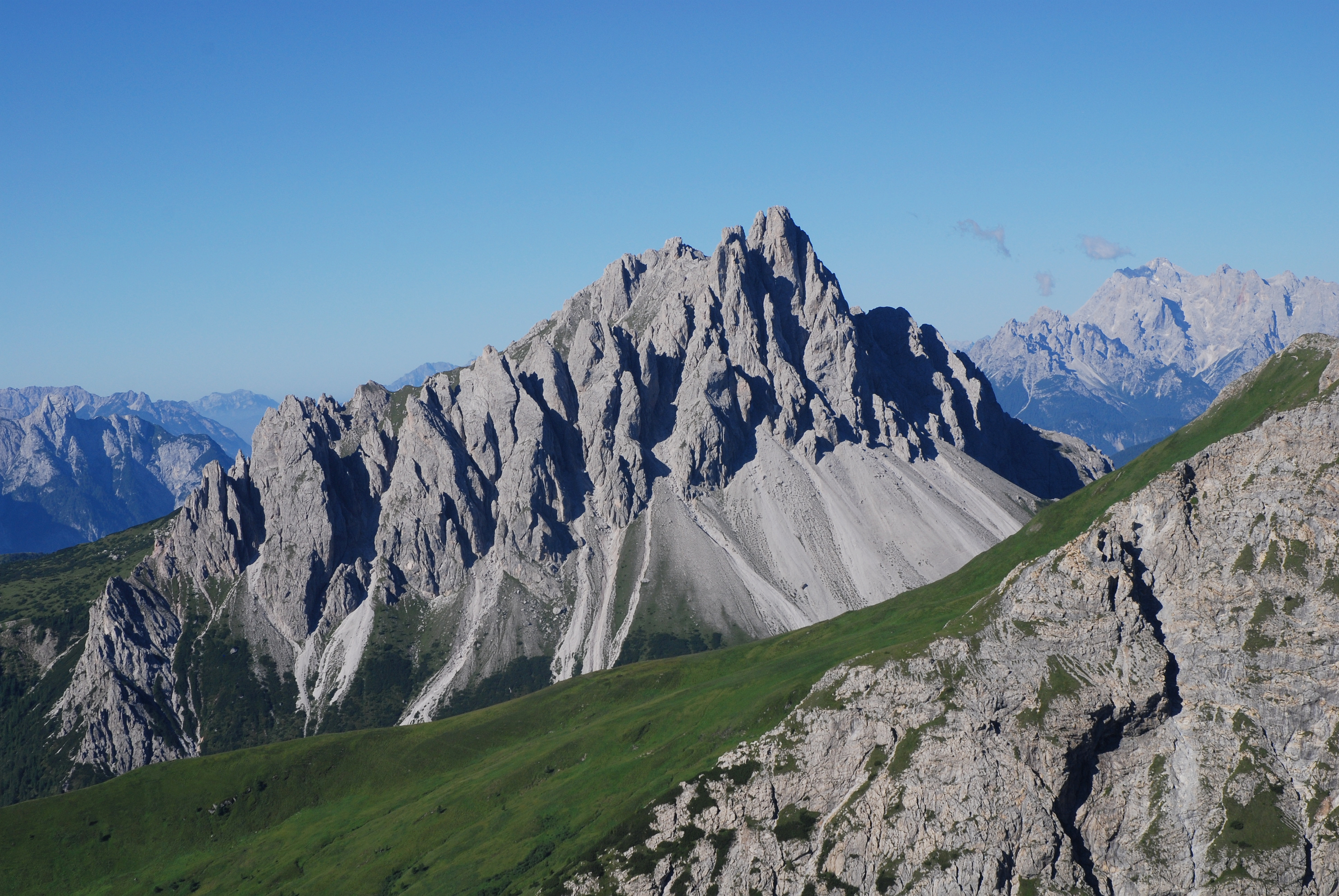
- North aspect

Highest point
- Elevation: 2,571 m (8,435 ft)
- Prominence: 536 m (1,759 ft)
- Parent peak: Monte Peralba
- Isolation: 2.53 km (1.57 mi)
- Coordinates: 46°37′45″N 12°33′41″E

Geography
- Location within Italy
- Country: Italy
- Province: Belluno
- Parent range: Southern Limestone Alps; Carnic Alps
- Topo map: Tabacco 017 Dolomiti di Sesto / Sextener Dolomiten

Geology
- Rock age: Triassic
- Rock type: Sedimentary rock

Crode dei Longerin is a mountain in the province of Belluno in northern Italy.

== Description ==
Crode dei Longerin is a 2,571-metre-elevation (8,435-foot) summit in the Carnic Alps which are a subrange of the Southern Limestone Alps. Set in the Veneto region, the mountain is located five kilometres (3.1 miles) northeast of the municipality of Comelico Superiore. Precipitation runoff from the mountain's slopes drains into tributaries of the Piave. Topographic relief is significant as the summit rises over 1,300 m (4,300 ft) above the Digon Valley in approximately 2.5 km (1.6 mi). The north peak is the true summit, but the south peak (2,523 m) is a more accessible climb. The nearest higher mountain is Porze, 2.6 km (1.6 mi) to the north. The mountain's toponym translates as "Crags of Longerin."

== Climate ==
Based on the Köppen climate classification, Crode dei Longerin is located in an alpine climate zone with long, cold winters, and short, mild summers. Weather systems are forced upwards by the mountains (orographic lift), causing moisture to drop in the form of rain and snow. The months of June through September offer the most favorable weather for visiting or climbing this mountain.

== Gallery ==
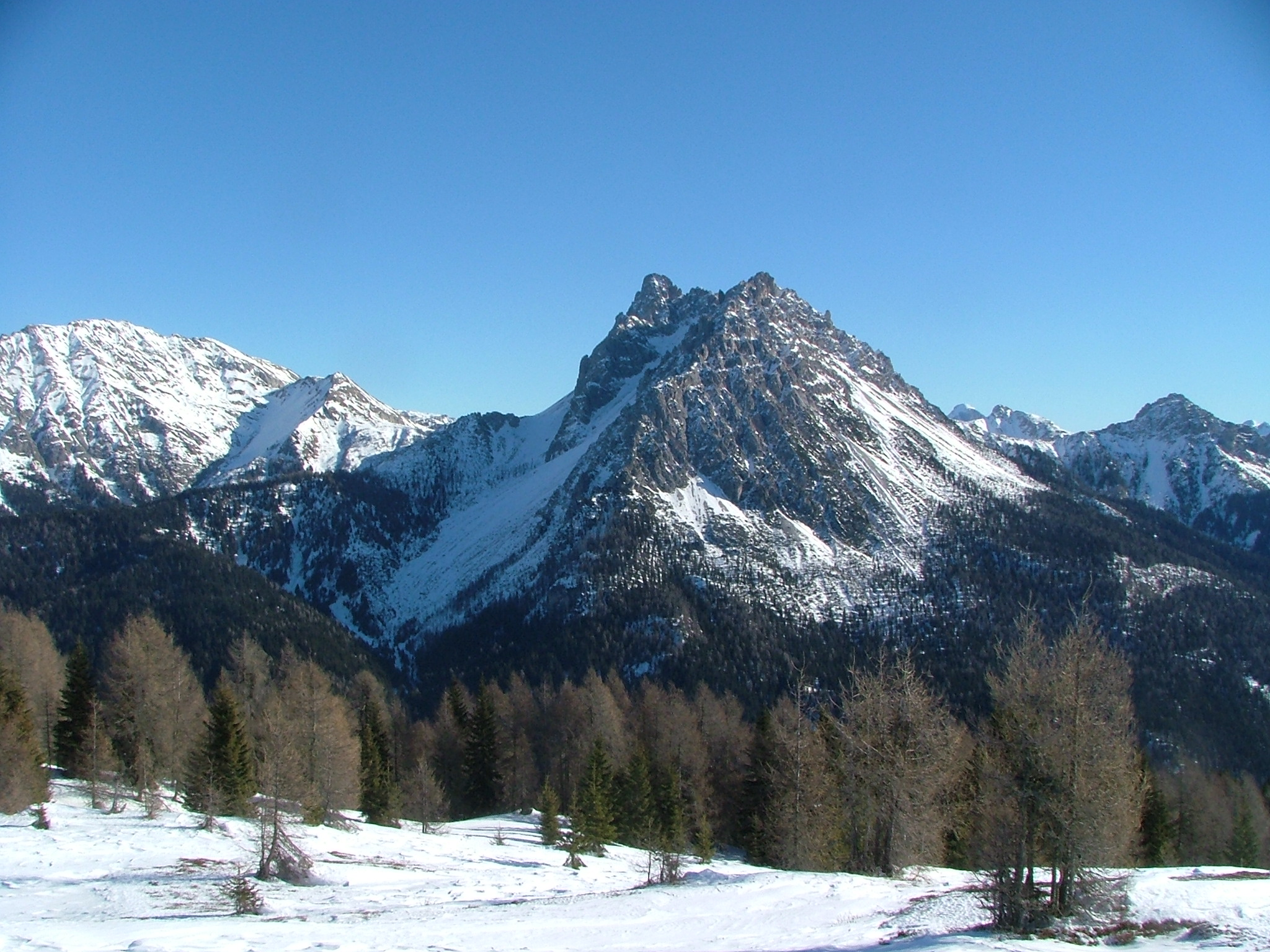
Southwest aspect centered. Porze to left.

== See also ==
- Carnic and Gailtal Alps
- Geography of the Alps
