= SOIUSA =

Orographic classification system of the Alps

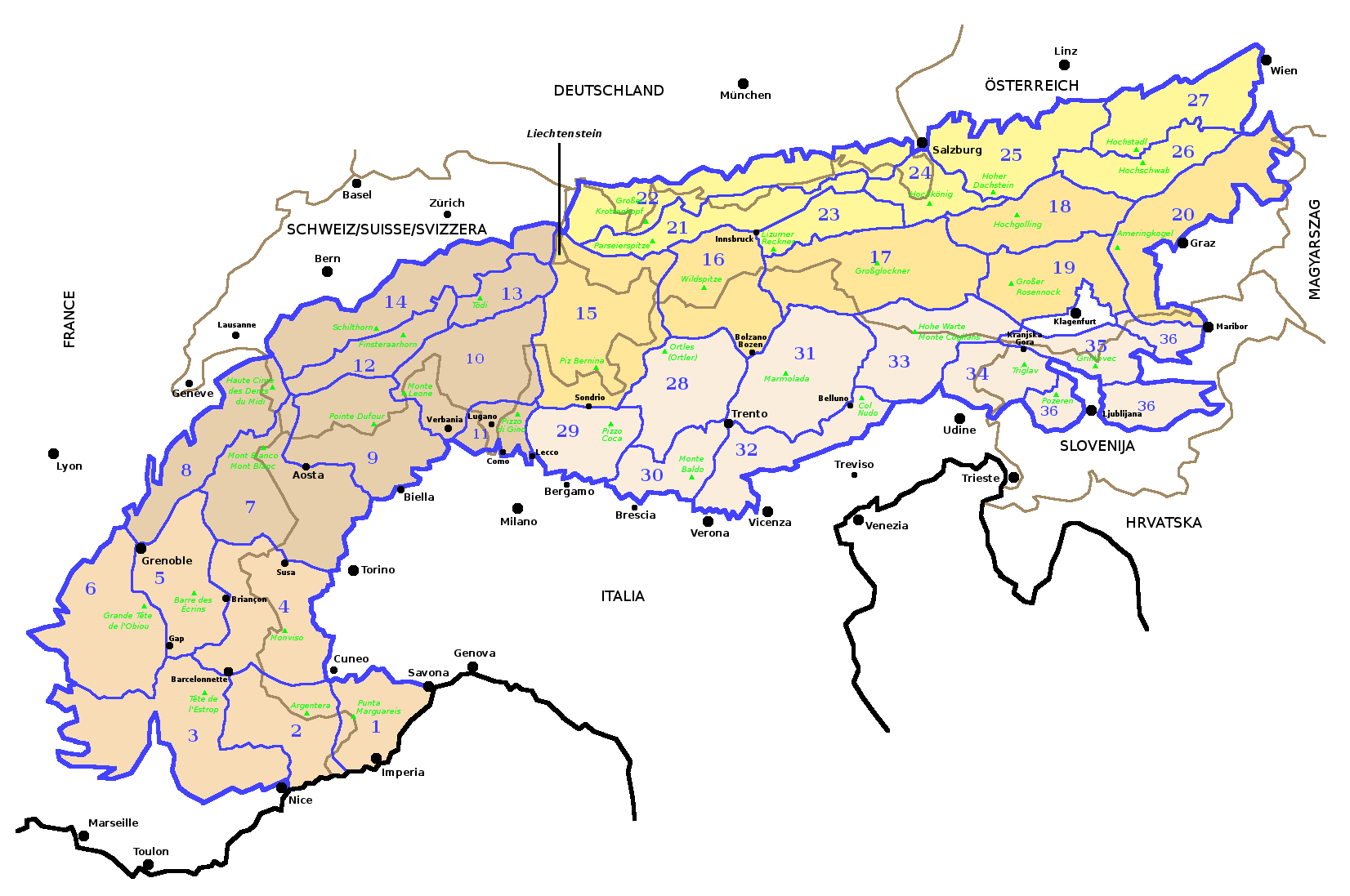
Alps by SOIUSA.

SOIUSA (an acronym for Suddivisione Orografica Internazionale Unificata del Sistema Alpino - English: International Standardized Mountain Subdivision of the Alps-ISMSA) is a classification system of the Alps from the geographic and toponomastic point of view. It was designed by Sergio Marazzi, Italian researcher and author of the Orographic Atlas of the Alps SOIUSA. His book was presented with the patronage of the Italian Alpine Club on 23 Jan 2006, but has yet to receive any formal acceptance.

== History ==
The SOIUSA is an interpretation by Marazzi of the terrain of the Alps aiming to replace the traditional way the Alps were partitioned in Italy, the Partizione delle Alpi, which was adopted in 1926 by the Italian National Geographic Committee (Comitato Geografico Nazionale) after the IX Italian Geographic Congress (Congresso Geografico Italiano). SOIUSA takes into account the European geographic literature normalizing and standardizing the different national classification systems in use. It was publicly presented in a lecture organized by the Italian Alpine Club's Milan conference on 6 April 2006, following the publication of Marazzi's book.

== Structure ==
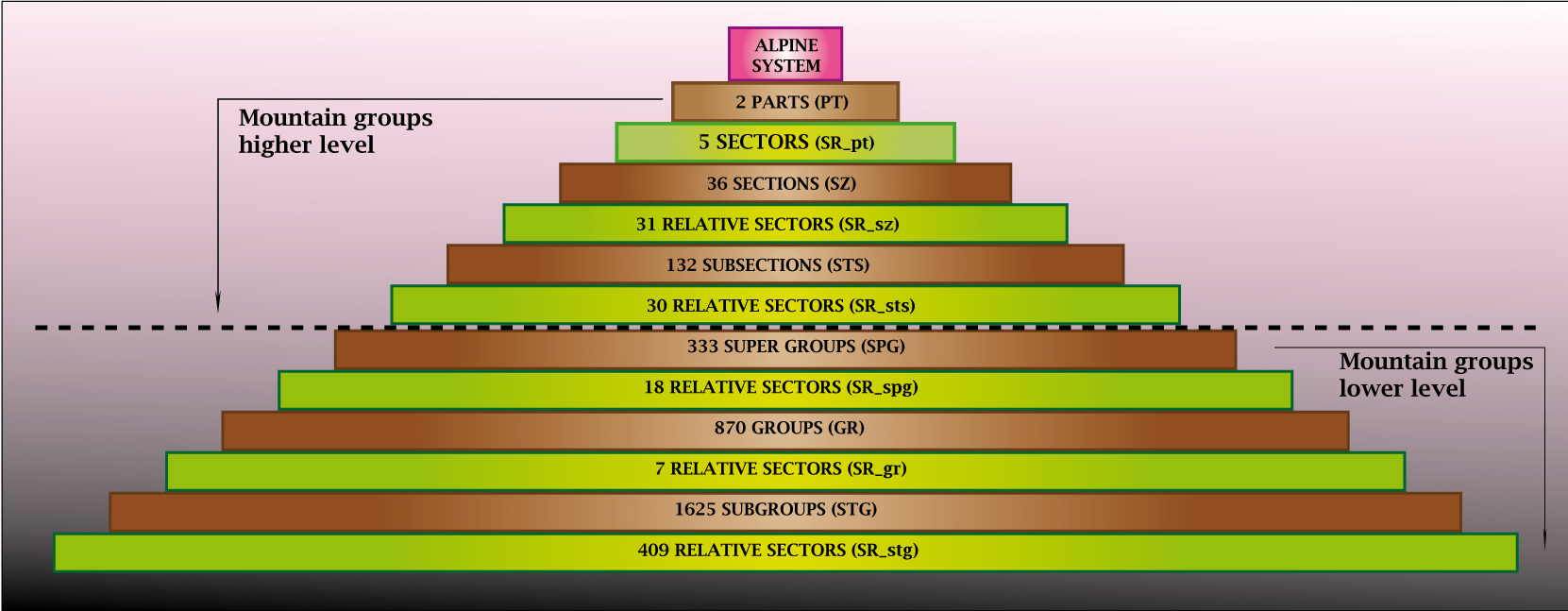
Pyramid by SOIUSA.

The SOIUSA introduces the bipartition of the Alpine System (Western Alps and Eastern Alps) replacing the old tripartite division (Western Alps, Central Alps and Eastern Alps) by a multilevel pyramidal hierarchy according to identical scales and rules.

Mountain groups higher level: fractionated with morphological and altimetric benchmark taking into account the historical and geographical regions in the Alps.

- 2 main parts (PT) (de:Teile; fr:grandes parties; it:parti; sl:dela):
  - Western Alps and Eastern Alps.
- 5 major sectors (SR) (de:Sektoren; fr:grands secteurs; it:settori; sl:velikih sektorjev):
  - the occidental part is divided into two areas from south to north and then northeast: Southwestern Alps and Northwestern Alps;
  - the oriental part is divided into three areas from west to east: Central Eastern Alps, North Eastern Alps, South Eastern Alps.
- 36 sections (SZ) (de:Sektionen; fr:sections; it:sezioni; sl:sekcij).
- 132 subsections (STS) (de:Untersektionen; fr:sous-sections; it:sottosezioni; sl:podsekcij).

Mountain groups lower level: divided with a benchmark mountaineering.

- 333 supergroups (SPG) (de:Supergruppen; fr:super-groupes; it:supergruppi; sl:nadskupina).
- 870 groups (GR) (de:Gruppen; fr:groupes; it:gruppi; sl:skupine).
- 1625 subgroups (STG) (de:Untergruppen; fr:sous-groupes; it:sottogruppi; sl:podskupine).

Relative sectors (SR) intermediate to the groups above are also defined:

- 31 sectors of sections (SR of SZ)
- 30 sectors of subsections (SR of STS)
- 18 sectors of supergroups (SR of SPG)
- 7 sectors of groups (SR of GR)
- 409 sectors of subgroups (SR of STG)

To any alpine mountain can be assigned a SOIUSA code, which shows to what part, sector, section, subsection, supergroup, group and subgroup the mountain belongs.

Example:

SOIUSA parametres for Pointe Sommeiller (Fr) / Punta Sommeiller (It) are:

Main part:Western Alps
 Major sector:Southwestern Alps
  Section:Cottian Alps
   Subsection:Northern Cottian Alps
    Supergroup:chaîne Bernaude-Pierre Menue-Ambin (Fr) /
               catena Bernauda-Pierre Menue-Ambin (It) 
     Group:groupe d'Ambin (Fr) /
           gruppo d'Ambin (It) 
      Subgroup:crête Sommeiller-Vallonetto (Fr) /
               sottogruppo Sommeiller-Vallonetto (It) 
Code:I/A-4.III-B.6.b

=== Naming ===
Names of higher level groups are given in the four main languages spoken in the Alps (German, French, Italian, Slovene) and in English, while lower level groups are just named in the language/languages of the concerned country/countries.

Examples:

Northern Cottian Alps subsection (STS.4.III ) is also called:

Nördliche Cottishche Alpen (De),
Alpes du Mont Cenis (Fr),
Alpi del Moncenisio (It),
Severne Kotijske Alpe (Sl).

Ambin group, located on the French-Italian border, is just referred as:

Groupe d'Ambin (Fr) and
Gruppo d'Ambin (It).

== Western Alps ==
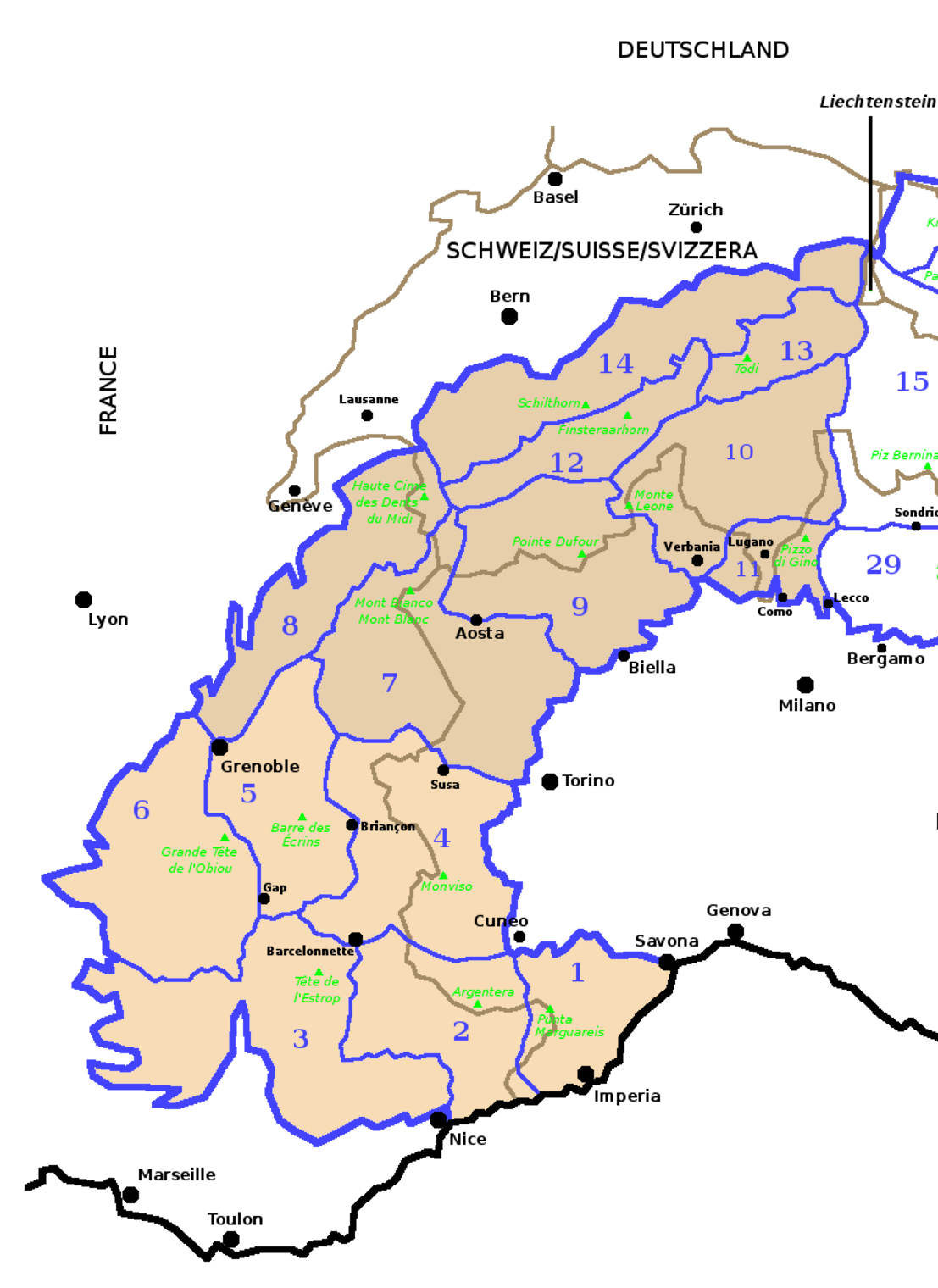
SOIUSA western Alps' sections.

From the line Savona - Bocchetta di Altare - Montezemolo - Mondovì to the line Rhine - Splügen Pass - Lake Como - Lake Lecco; they are divided in 14 sections (in brackets their highest summit).

=== Southwestern Alps ===
- 1. Ligurian Alps (Punta Marguareis, 2,661 metres (8,730 ft))
- 2. Maritime Alps (Monte Argentera, 3,297 metres (10,817 ft))
- 3. Provence Alps and Prealps (Tête de l'Estrop, 2,961 metres (9,715 ft))
- 4. Cottian Alps (Monviso, 3,841 metres (12,602 ft))
- 5. Dauphiné Alps (Barre des Écrins, 4,102 metres (13,458 ft))
- 6. Dauphiné Prealps (Grande Tête de l'Obiou, 2,790 metres (9,150 ft))

=== Northwestern Alps ===
- 7. Graian Alps (Mont Blanc, 4,810 metres (15,780 ft))
- 8. Savoy Prealps (Haute Cime des Dents du Midi, 3,257 metres (10,686 ft))
- 9. Pennine Alps (Monte Rosa, 4,634 metres (15,203 ft))
- 10. Lepontine Alps (Monte Leone, 3,552 metres (11,654 ft))
- 11. Lugano Prealps (Pizzo di Gino, 2,245 metres (7,365 ft))
- 12. Bernese Alps i.t.w.m. (Finsteraarhorn, 4,274 metres (14,022 ft))
- 13. Glarus Alps i.t.w.m. (Tödi, 3,620 metres (11,880 ft))
- 14. Swiss Prealps (Schilthorn, 2,970 metres (9,740 ft))

== Eastern Alps ==
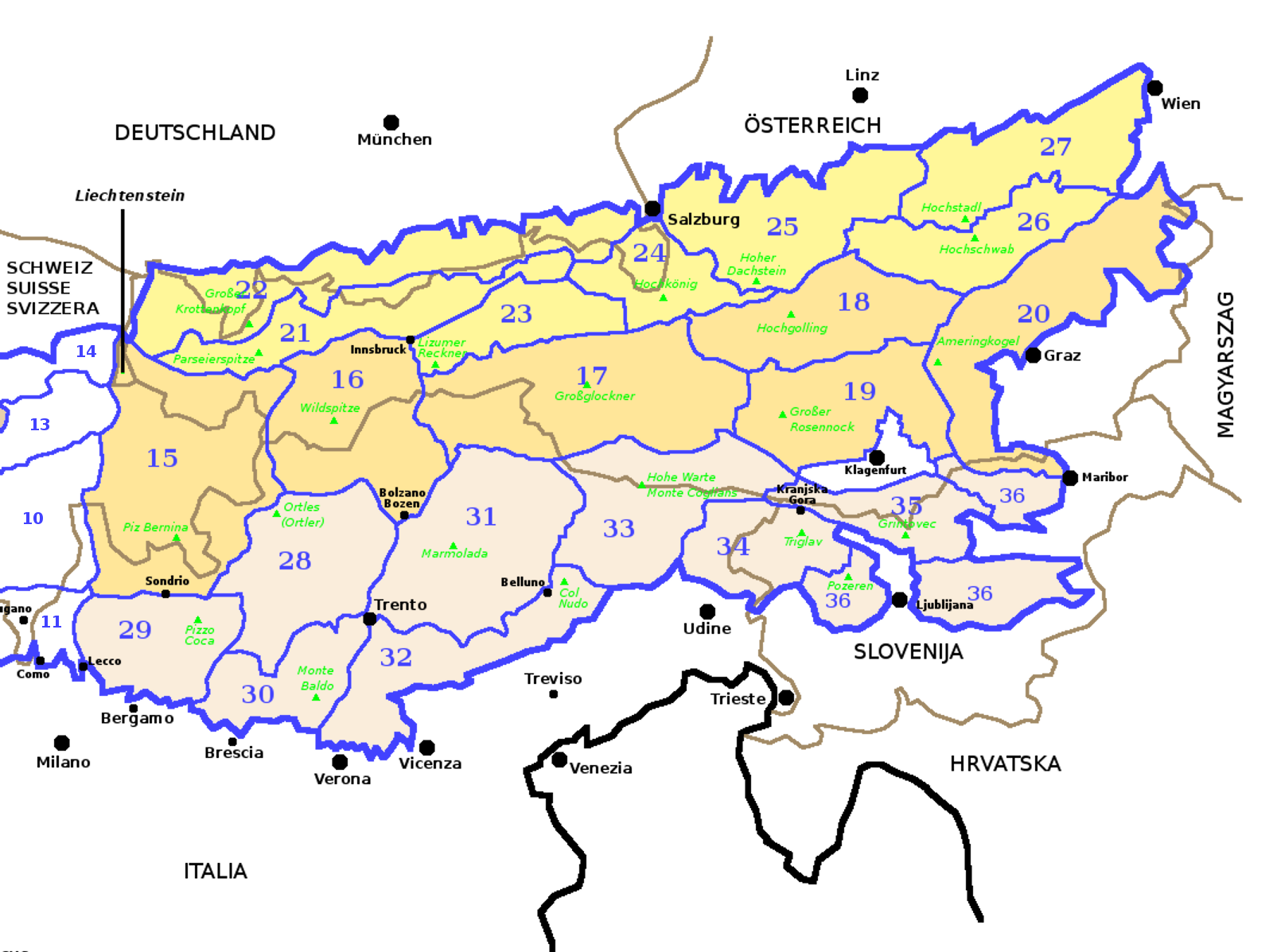
SOIUSA eastern Alps' sections.

From the line Rhine - Splügen Pass - Lake Como - Lake Lecco to the line Vienna-Sopron-Köszeg-Graz-Maribor and Godovič Pass; they are divided in 22 sections (in brackets their highest summit).

=== Central-eastern Alps ===
- 15. Western Rhaetian Alps (Piz Bernina, 4,049 metres (13,284 ft))
- 16. Eastern Rhaetian Alps (Wildspitze, 3,772 metres (12,375 ft))
- 17 Western Tauern Alps (Großglockner, 3,798 metres (12,461 ft))
- 18. Eastern Tauern Alps (Hochgolling, 2,863 metres (9,393 ft))
- 19. Carinthian-Styrian Alps (Eisenhut, 2,441 metres (8,009 ft))
- 20. Styrian Prealps (Ameringkogel, 2,184 metres (7,165 ft))

=== Northeastern Alps ===
- 21. North Tyrol Limestone Alps (Parseierspitze, 3,040 metres (9,970 ft))
- 22. Bavarian Alps (Großer Krottenkopf, 2,657 metres (8,717 ft))
- 23. Tyrol Schistose Alps (Lizumer Reckner, 2,884 metres (9,462 ft))
- 24. Northern Salzburg Alps (Hochkönig, 2,941 metres (9,649 ft))
- 25. Salzkammergut and Upper Austria Alps (Hoher Dachstein, 2,993 metres (9,820 ft))
- 26. Northern Styrian Alps (Hochtor, 2,369 metres (7,772 ft))
- 27. Northern Lower Austria Alps (Hochstadl, 1,919 metres (6,296 ft))

=== Southeastern Alps ===
- 28. Southern Rhaetian Alps (Ortler, 3,905 metres (12,812 ft))
- 29. Bergamasque Alps and Prealps (Pizzo di Coca, 3,052 metres (10,013 ft))
- 30. Brescia and Garda Prealps (Monte Cadria, 2,254 metres (7,395 ft))
- 31. Dolomites (Marmolada, 3,342 metres (10,965 ft))
- 32. Venetian Prealps (Col Nudo, 2,472 metres (8,110 ft))
- 33. Carnic and Gailtal Alps (Monte Coglians, 2,780 metres (9,120 ft))
- 34. Julian Alps and Prealps (Triglav, 2,864 metres (9,396 ft))
- 35. Carinthian-Slovenian Alps (Grintovec, 2,558 metres (8,392 ft))
- 36. Slovenian Prealps (Porezen, 1,630 metres (5,350 ft))

== See also ==
- Alpine Club classification of the Eastern Alps
- SOIUSA code

== Sources ==
- Marazzi, Sergio; Grimm, Peter; Mattmüller, Claus R; Zahn, Paul; Jurgalski, Eberhard (2004), Die Gebirgsgruppen der Alpen:Ansichten, Systematiken und Methoden zur Einteilung der Alpen. Die orographischen einteilungen der Alpen und die IVOEA, German and Austrian Alpine Clubs, (German/English) Munich, pp. 69–96 .
- Marazzi, Sergio (1991). Atlante orografico del monte Bianco, Priuli & Verlucca.
- Marazzi, Sergio (2005). Atlante Orografico delle Alpi. SOIUSA, Priuli & Verlucca, ISBN 978-88-8068-273-8.
- Marazzi, Sergio (2012). SOIUSA - Suddivisione orografica internazionale unificata del Sistema Alpino , on-line article at www.fioridimontagna.it, accessed on 7 Feb 2012
- "Dataset: Unified International Orographic Subdivision of the Alpine System — SOIUSA". European Data. European Union. 2016-09-20.
