= Carinthian-Styrian Alps =

Mountain range in Austria

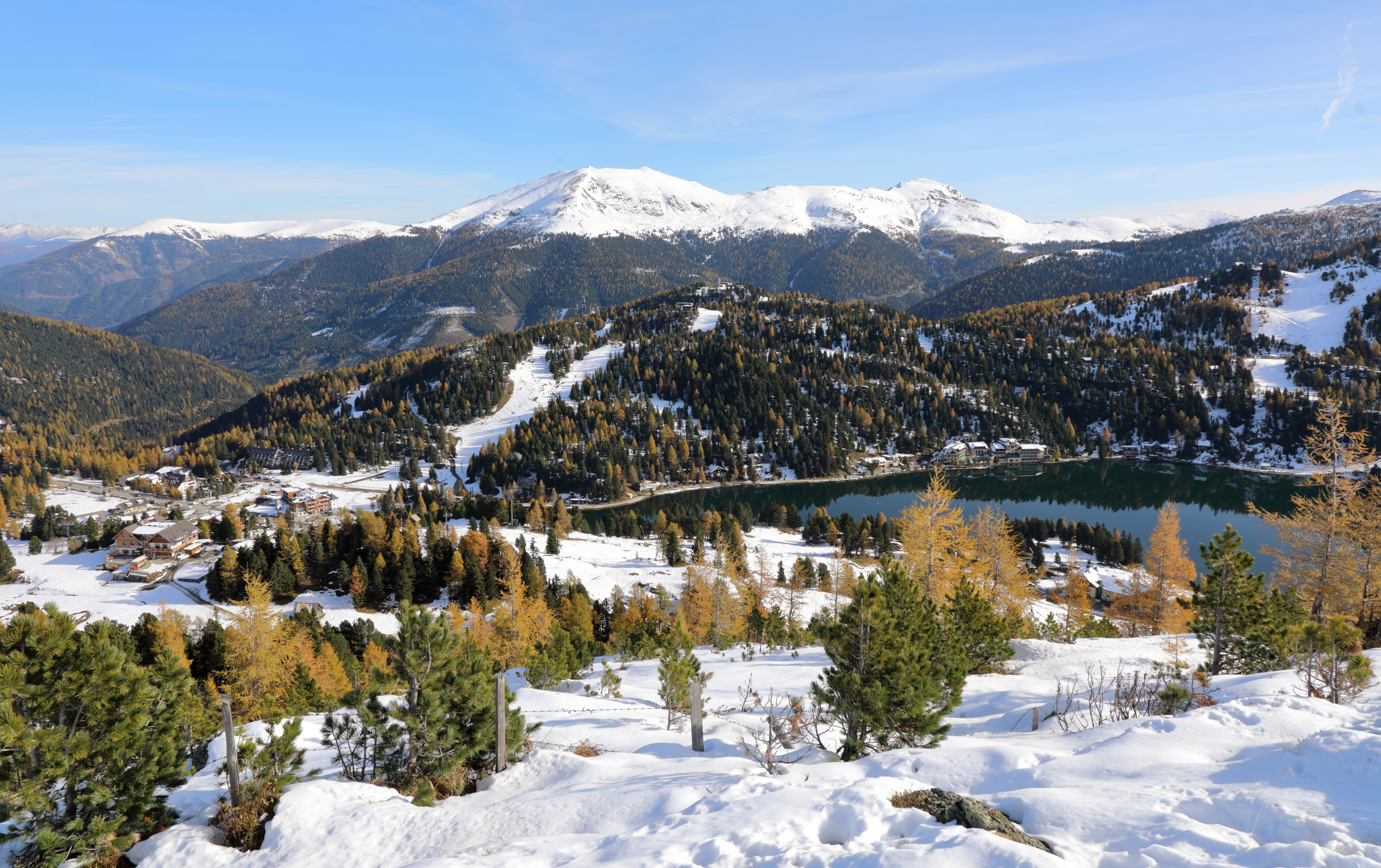
- The mountains Eisenhut and Wintertalernock in autumn

Highest point
- Peak: Eisenhut
- Elevation: 2,441 m (8,009 ft)
- Coordinates: 46°57′12″N 13°55′34″E

Naming
- Native name: Steirisch-Kärntnerische Alpen, Gurk-und Lavanttaler Alpen; (German)

Geography
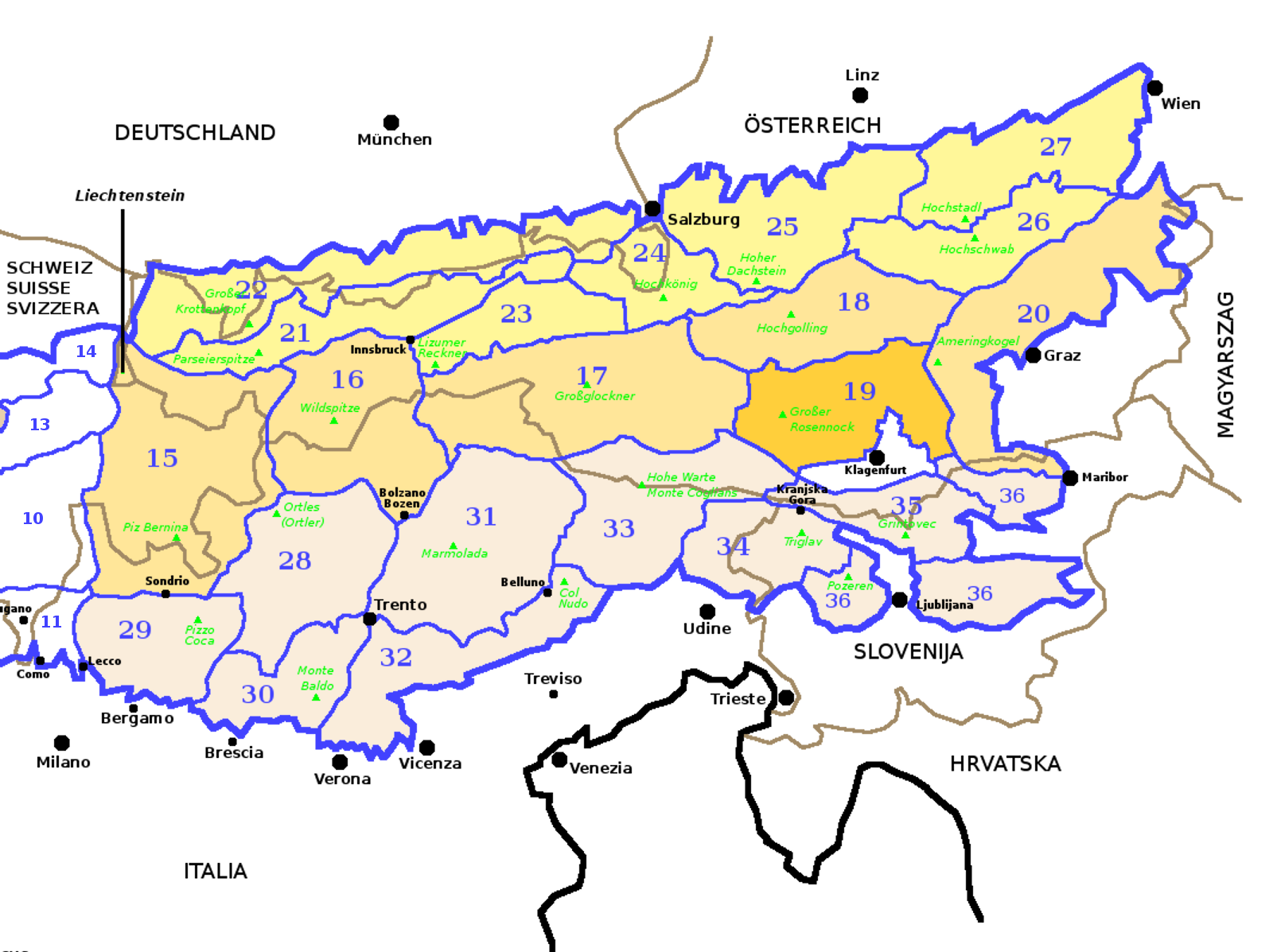
- Carinthian-Styrian Alps (section nr.19) within Eastern Alps
- Country: Austria
- States of Austria: Styria, Carinthia, Salzburg
- Parent range: Alps
- Borders on: Styrian Prealps, Eastern Tauern Alps, Western Tauern Alps, Carnic and Gailtal Alps and Slovenian Prealps

Geology
- Orogeny: Alpine orogeny

The Carinthian-Styrian Alps (in German Steirisch-Kärntnerische Alpen or Gurk-und Lavanttaler Alpen) are a mountain range in the eastern part of the Alps. They are located in Austria.

== Geography ==
Administratively the range belongs to the Austrian state of Styria, Carinthia and, marginally, to Salzburg. Its whole area is drained by the tributaries of the Danube river.

=== SOIUSA classification ===
According to SOIUSA (International Standardized Mountain Subdivision of the Alps) the Carinthian-Styrian Alps are an Alpine section, classified in the following way:

- main part = Eastern Alps
- major sector = Central Eastern Alps
- section = Carinthian-Styrian Alps
- SOIUSA code = II/A-19

=== Subdivision ===
The Carinthian-Styrian Alps are divided in two subsections:

- Gurktal Alps - SOIUSA code: II/A-19.I
- Lavanttal Alps - SOIUSA code: II/A-19.II

== Notable summits ==
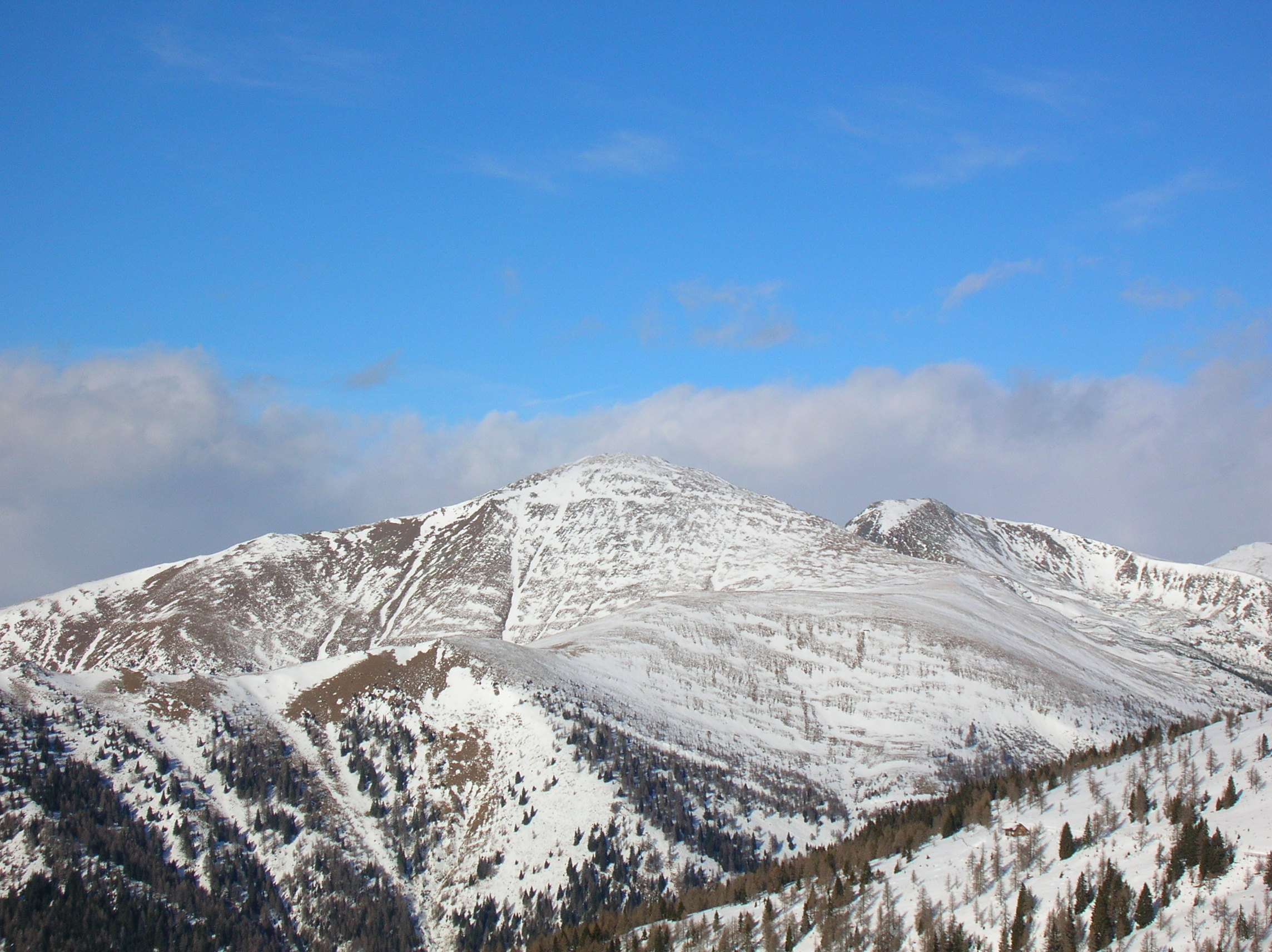
Mount Großer Rosennock

Some notable summits of the Carinthian-Styrian Alps are:

Name	metres	feet
Eisenhut	2,441	8,006
Großer Rosennock	2,440	8,003
Kilnprein	2,408	7,898
Zirbitzkogel	2,396	7,858
Mirnock	2,110	6,920
Ulrichsberg	1,022	3,352
