= Monte Cridola =

Mountain in Italy

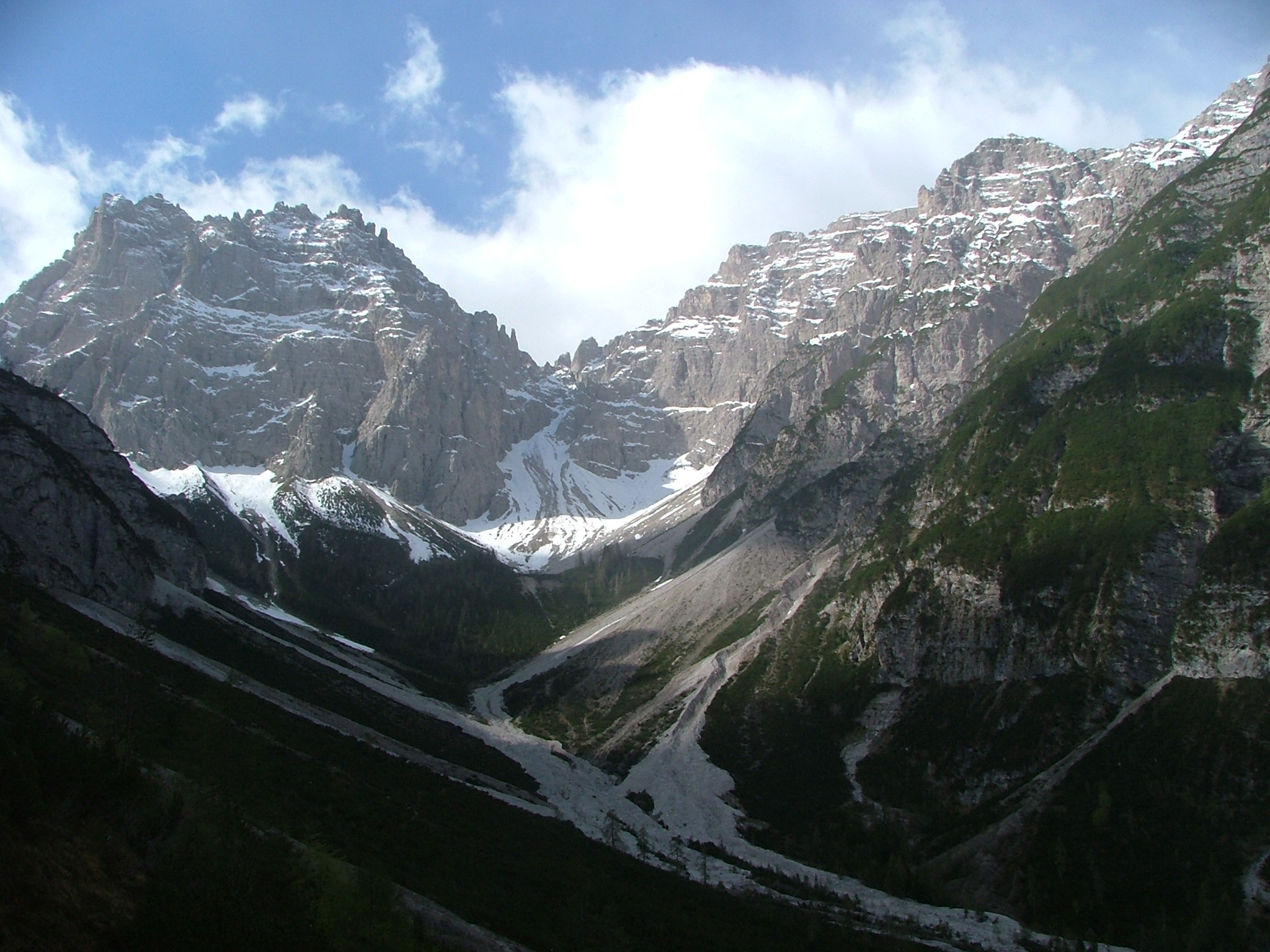

Highest point
- Elevation: 2,581 m (8,468 ft)
- Listing: Alpine mountains 2500-2999 m
- Coordinates: 46°26′00″N 12°29′00″E

Geography
- Location within Alps
- Location: Veneto, Friuli-Venezia Giulia - Italy
- Parent range: Carnic Prealps

Climbing
- First ascent: Julius Kugy and Pacifico Zandegiacomo Orsolina (guide)

Monte Cridola (Friulian: Mont Cridule) is a mountain of the Veneto, Italy. It has an elevation of 2581 metres. It is located on the border between the provinces of Belluno and Udine.

== SOIUSA classification ==
According to the SOIUSA (International Standardized Mountain Subdivision of the Alps) the mountain can be classified in the following way:

- main part = Eastern Alps
- major sector = Southern Limestone Alps
- section = Carnic and Gailtal Alps
- subsection = Carnic Prealps
- supergroup =Catena Duranno-Monfalconi-Pramaggiore
- group = Gruppo della Cridola
- code = II/C-33.III-A.1
