= Godovič Pass =

- Location within Alps
- Elevation: 850 metres (2,790 ft)
- Traversed by: Road no. 207

Third Approach
- Location: Goriška, Slovenia
- Range: Alps; Dinaric Alps
- Coordinates: 45°54′50″N 14°01′48″E

The Godovič Pass is a mountain pass in Slovenia's traditional Inner Carniola region between Ajdovščina and Črni Vrh. It connects the Slovenian Prealps with the Dinaric Alps and conventionally represents the southeastern end of the Alps, as the Bocchetta di Altare represents the opposite end of the range.

== See also ==
- Godovič
