= Padola (stream) =

River in South Tyrol and Veneto, Italy

Coordinates: 46°33′09″N 12°32′37″E

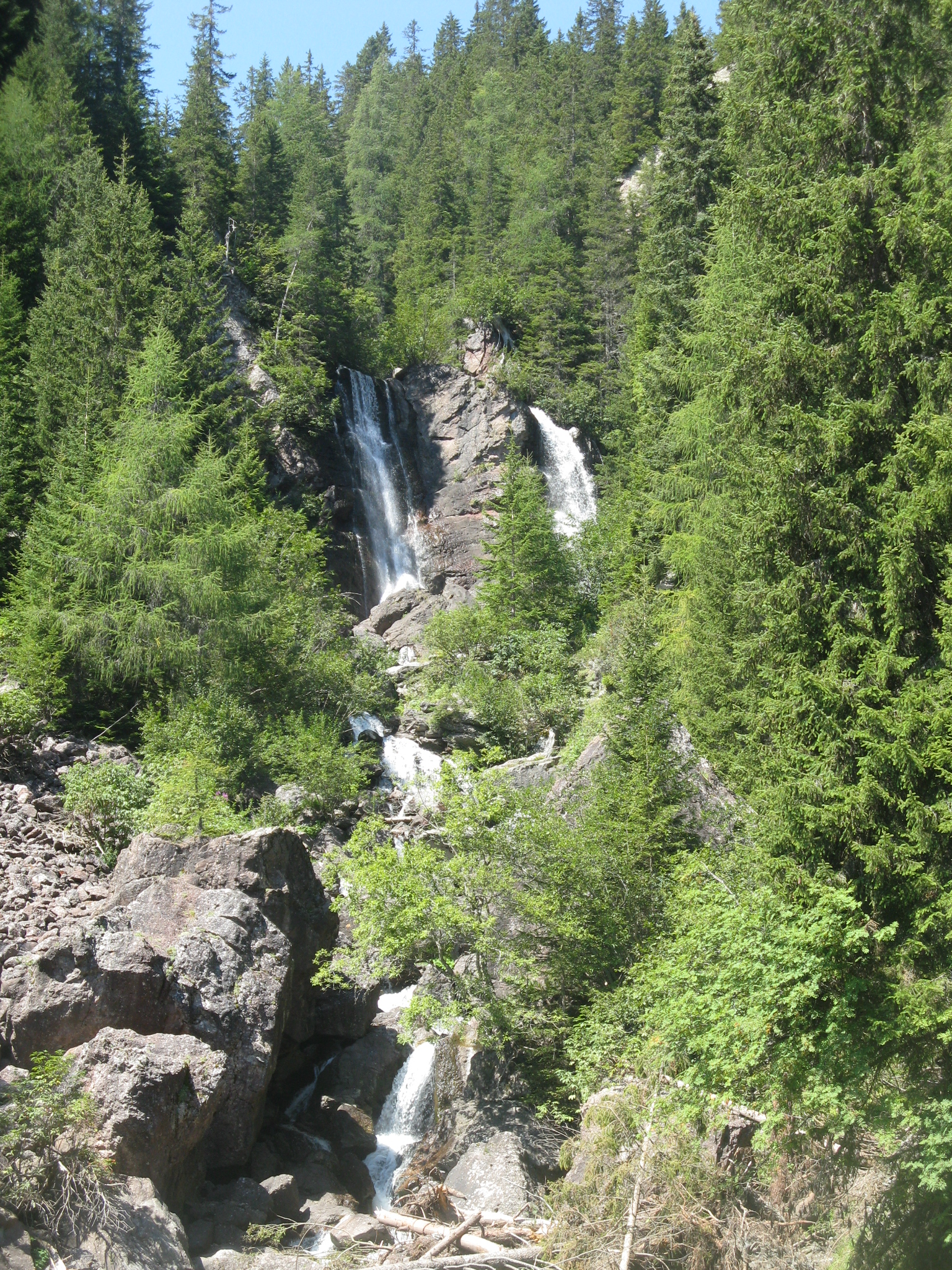
- Waterfall along the Padola stream south of the Monte Croce di Comelico pass

Location
- Country: Italy
- Region: Veneto Trentino-Alto Adige

Physical characteristics
- Mouth: Piave
- Length: 18,84 km
- Basin size: 134 km²
- Discharge
  - average: 3.7 m^{3}/s (130 cu ft/s)

Basin features
- Tributaries
  - right: Risena, Digon.

The Padola is a torrential watercourse in the Province of Belluno that originates north-east of the Monte Croce di Comelico pass in South Tyrolean territory.

It first flows in a south-west direction and then, downstream of the aforementioned pass, it points decisively in a south-easterly direction, up to Santo Stefano di Cadore, where it flows into the Piave at an altitude of 900 m a.s.l. The main tributaries are the Risena stream (right tributary 4.88 km long, flows into the Padola upstream of the homonymous village) and Digon (the most important, 11.40 km long, flows from the left at Gera).

== The cidolo ==
Downstream of the town of Padola there is built a stua, that is an artificial barrier designed to collect the timber that was drained from the areas of the Alto Piave towards the valley (in particular Venice). We have news of this work as early as 1521; originally it was built in wood, in 1818/19 it was rebuilt in stone. This stua is probably the oldest built in the Piave basin, certainly the longest-lived and the only one still existing.

Another cidolo, of greater importance, was located in Perarolo di Cadore, a strategic place as it is located at the confluence of the Boite with the Piave (therefore a place where all the timber coming from the Ampezzo, Val Boite, Centro Cadore, Val d 'Ansiei and Comelico converged).

== Other projects ==
- Wikimedia Commons contains images or other files about Padola
