= Godovič =

Godovič Godovič
- Village
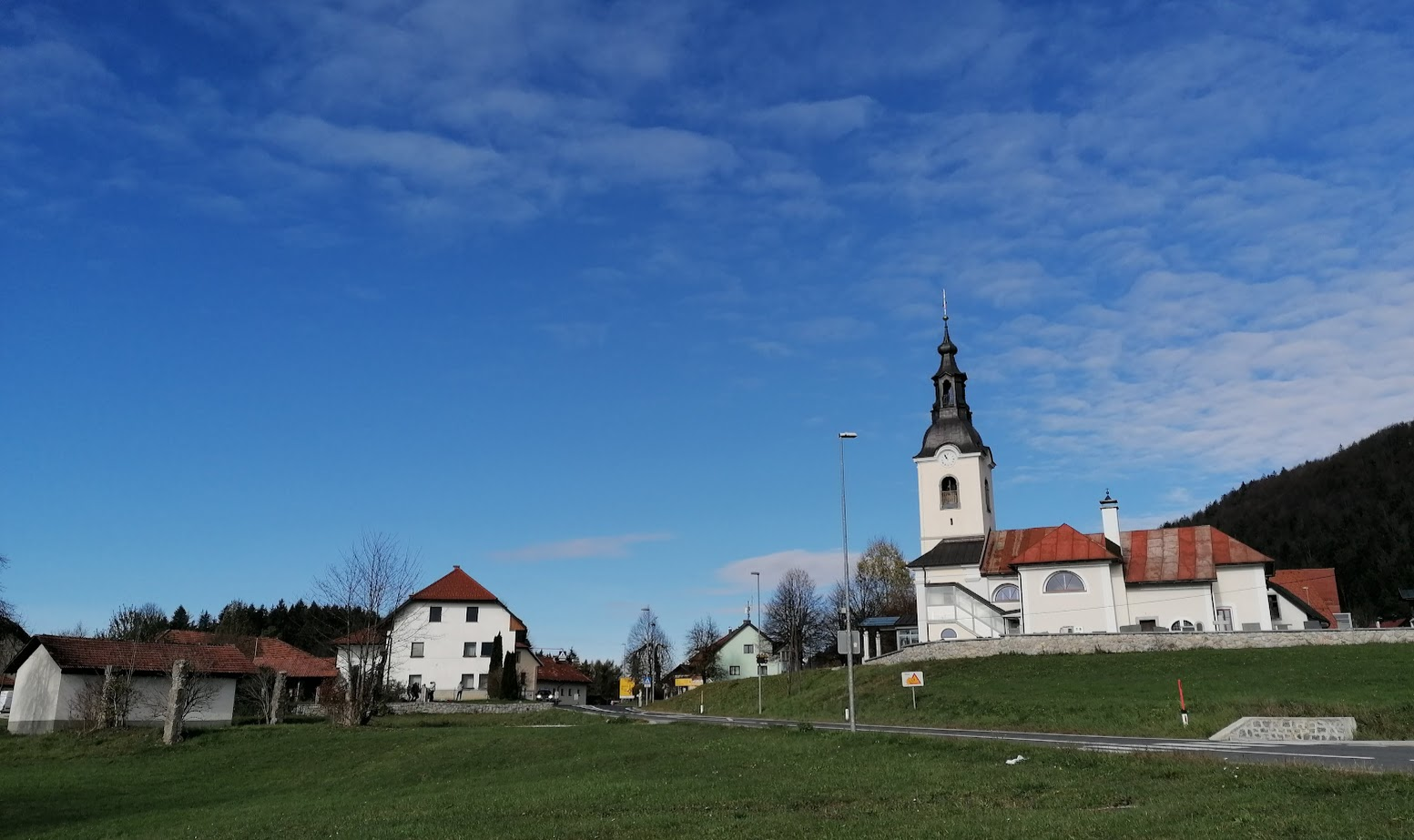
- Godovič

- Location in Slovenia
- Coordinates: 45°57′52.4″N 14°4′52.33″E
- Country: Slovenia
- Traditional region: Inner Carniola
- Statistical region: Gorizia
- Municipality: Idrija

Area
  - Total: 15.13 km^{2} (5.84 sq mi)
- Elevation: 580.4 m (1,904 ft)

Population (2022)
  - Total: ▲708
  - Density: 46.9/km^{2} (121/sq mi)
- Time zone: UTC+1 (UTC)
  - Summer (DST): UTC+2 (UTC)
- Postal codes: 5275
- Area code: 05 (+386 5 if calling from abroad)
- Vehicle registration: GO
- Website: godovic.si

Godovič (pronounced [ɡɔdɔˈʋiːtʃ] or [ɡɔdɔˈʋitʃ]; German: Godowitsch) is a settlement in the hills southeast of Idrija in the traditional Inner Carniola region of Slovenia.

== Geography ==
Godovič includes several hamlets and isolated farms: Šebalk, Andrejač, and Dol to the south; Česnik, Gabrovšek, Zala, and Brda to the west; Log, Anžič, Menart, and Lenart to the north; and Ivanje Doline (in older sources Ivanja Dolina, German: Johannsthal) and Cesar to the east.

== Name ==
Godovič was mentioned in historical sources as Godawitz in 1450. The name Godovič is based on a personal name with the root *god- (e.g., *Godislavъ, *Godimirъ, etc.), most likely referring to something good or favourable. It is related to place names such as Godič, Godemarci, and Godeninci. Locally, the name of the settlement has a mobile accent, pronounced [ɡɔˈdɔːʋitʃ], genitive [ɡɔdɔˈʋiːtʃa].

== Attractions ==
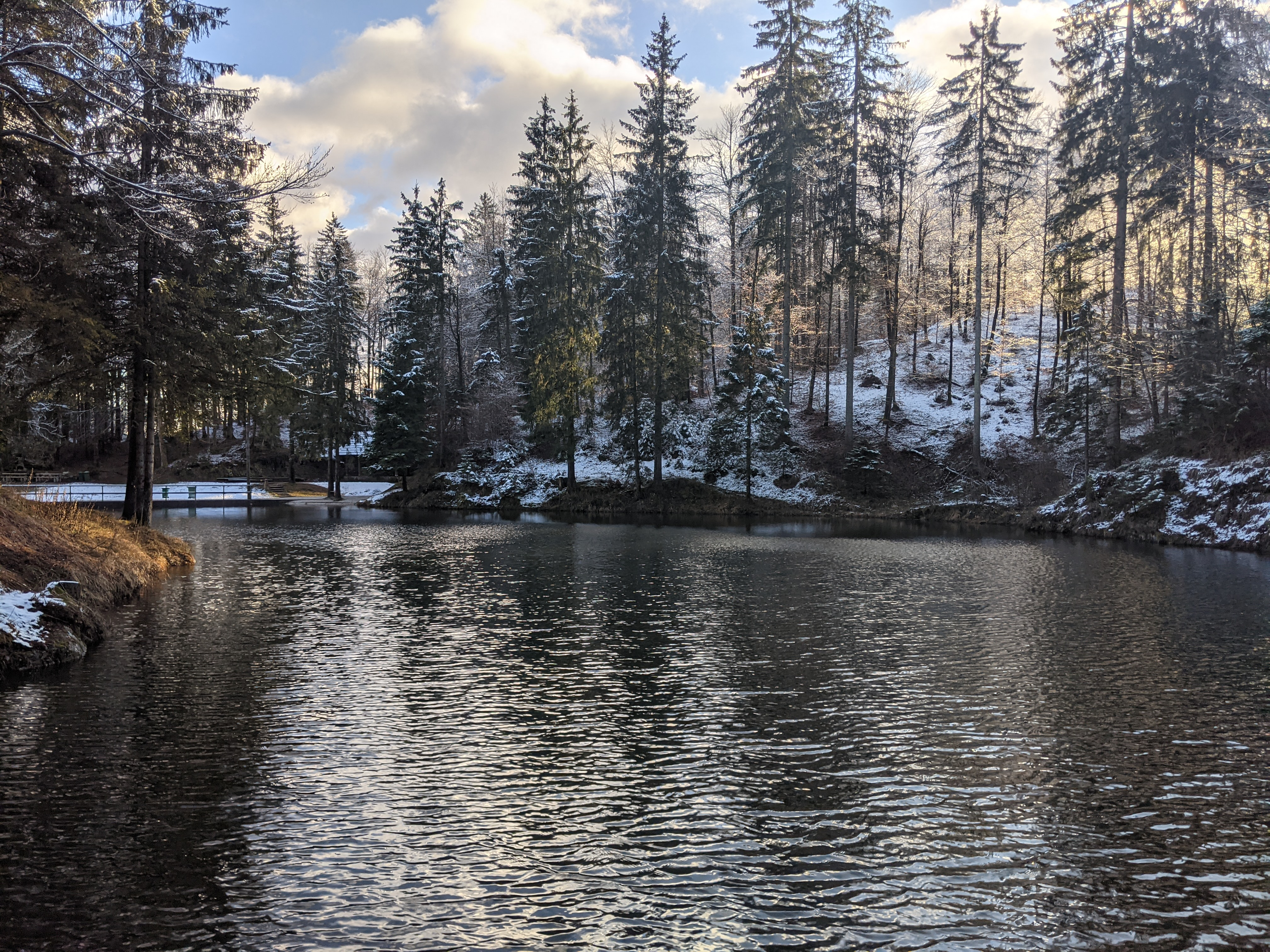
Godovič Pond (Godoviški bajer)

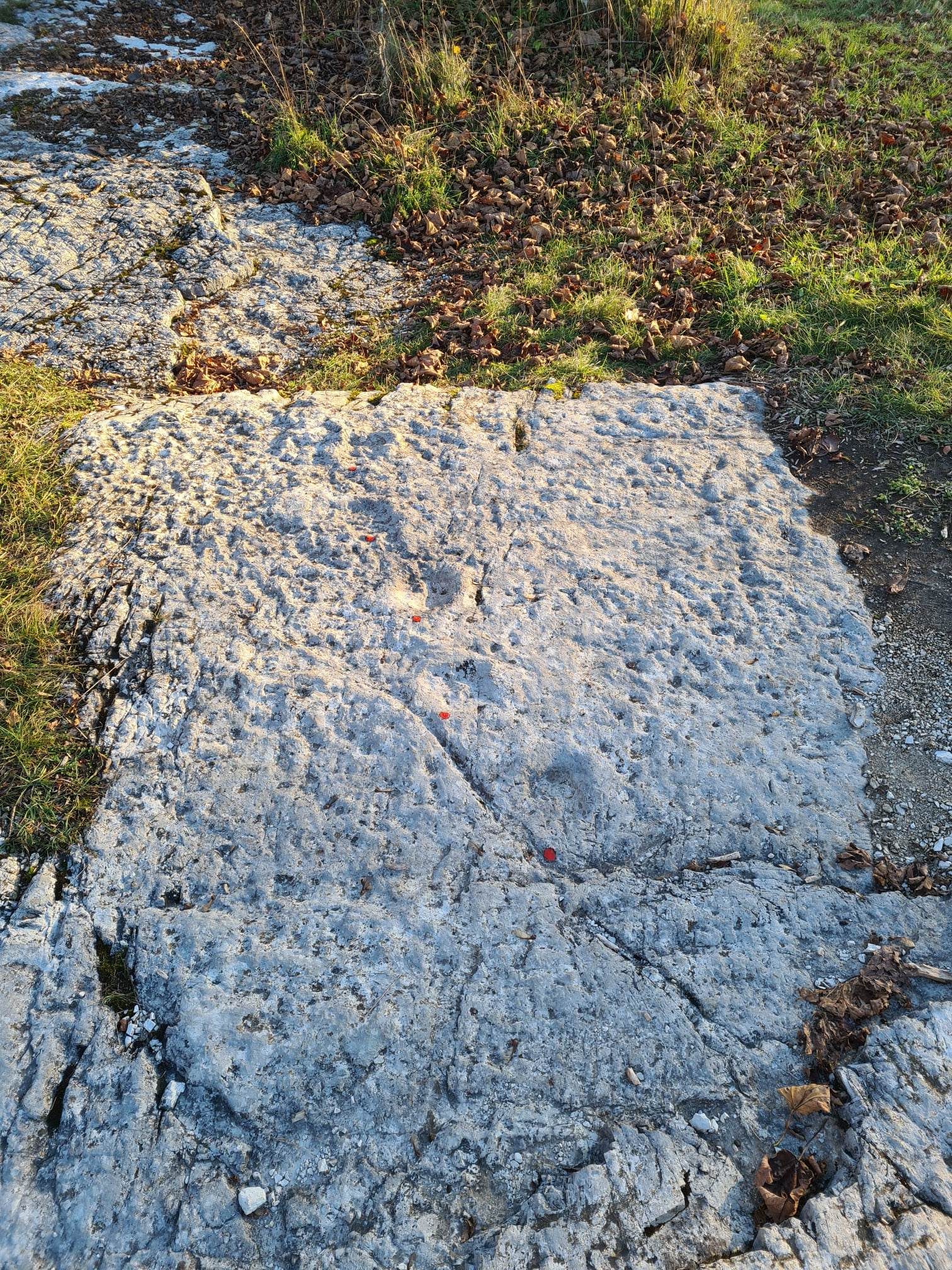
Fossilized dinosaur footsteps

Near Godovič there are fossilized dinosaur footprints. There are the remnants of a First World War military narrow-gauge railway known as the Feldban and an unfinished railroad tunnel from 1917. There are also examples of the snake-branch Norway spruce (Picea abies 'Virgata'), a rare variety of spruce.

== Church ==
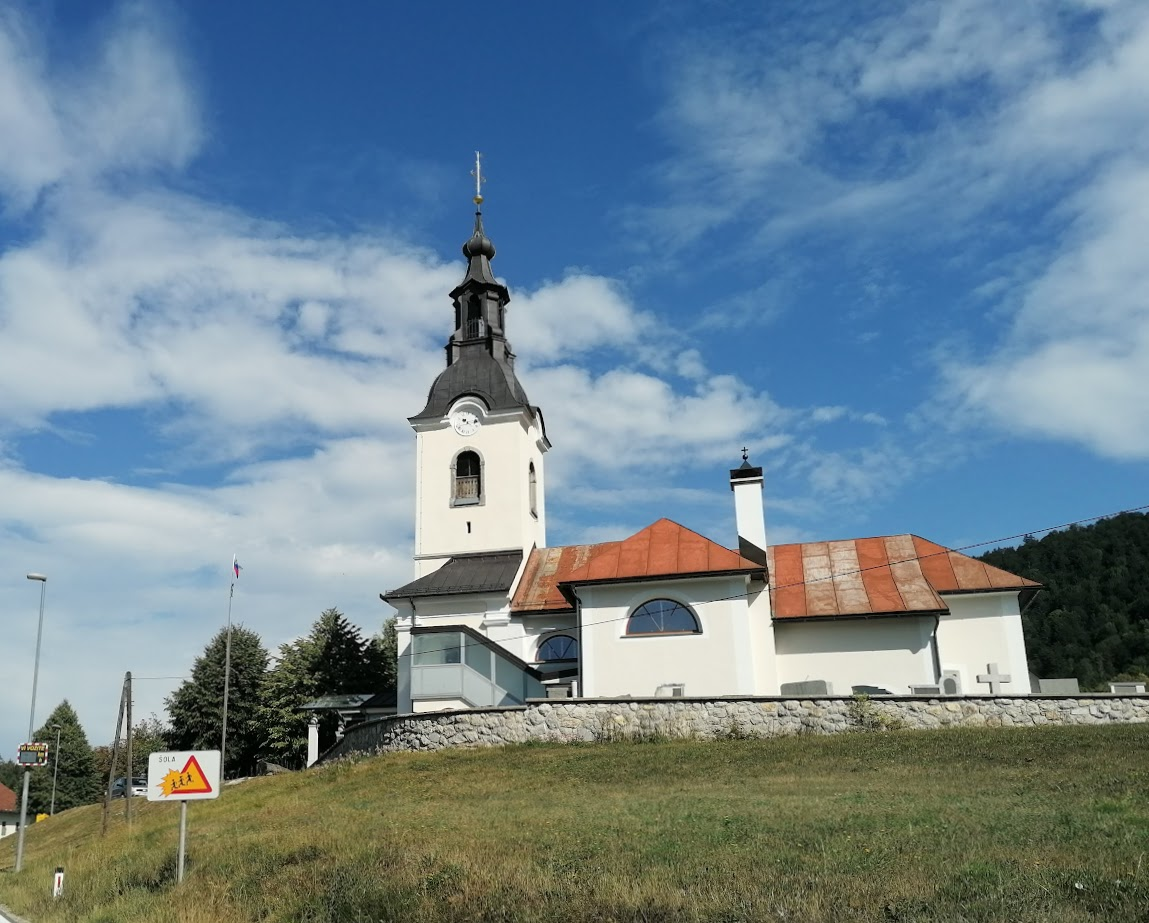
Saint Urban's Church

The parish church in the settlement is dedicated to Saint Urban and belongs to the Diocese of Koper.

== Notable people ==
- Marcos Luis Jerman (born 1957), artist and Olympic athlete
- Matevž Govekar (born 2000), racing cyclist for Team Bahrain Victorious
- Vinko Kobal (1928–2001), priest and translator

== See also ==
- Godovič Pass
