= Digon (stream) =

River in Italy

Location
- Country: Italy
- Region: Veneto

Physical characteristics
- Source: Col Quaternà
  - coordinates: 46°39′58.88″N 12°29′27.71″E
- Mouth: Padola stream, in Gera di San Nicolò di Comelico
- Length: 11,40 km
- Basin size: 46,3 km²
- Discharge
  - average: 1,30 m³/s

The Digon stream is a torrential watercourse in the Comelico region.

It originates from the northeastern slopes of Col Quaternà and runs through the homonymous valley, first in a south-easterly direction then in a southerly direction. It flows into the Padola in Gera di San Nicolò di Comelico.
