= Helm (mountain) =

Mountain in Italy

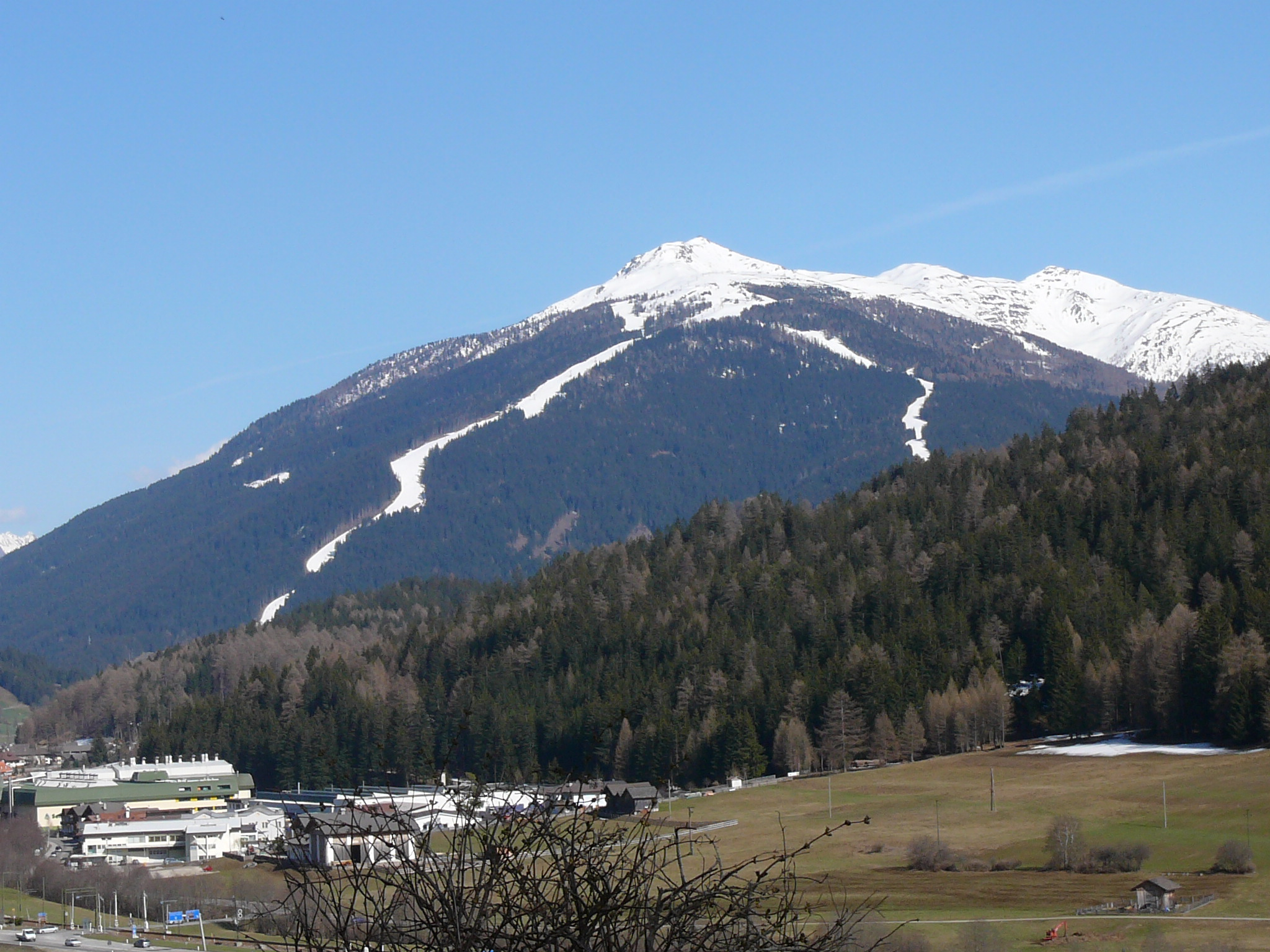

Highest point
- Elevation: 2,434 m (7,986 ft)
- Coordinates: 46°42′54″N 12°23′14″E

Geography
- Location within Italy Location within Alps
- Location: South Tyrol, Italy
- Parent range: Carnic Alps

The Helm (Italian: Monte Elmo; German: Helm) is a mountain in the Puster Valley in South Tyrol, Italy.
