= Monte Chiadenis =

Mountain in Italy

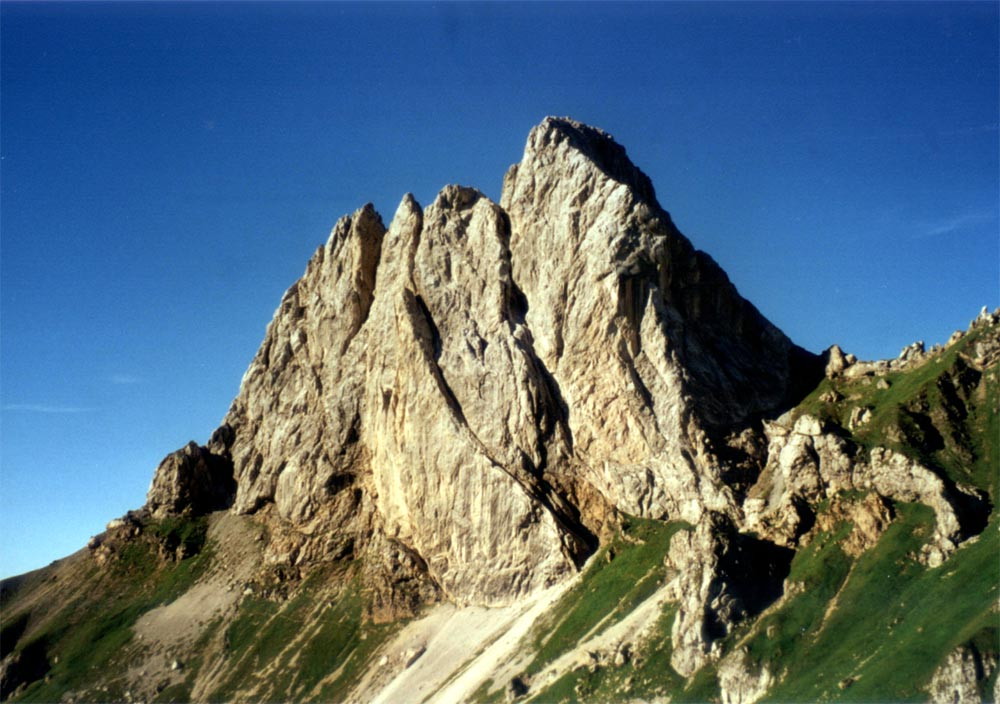
- Monte Chiadenis seen from north.

Highest point
- Elevation: 2,459 m (8,068 ft)
- Coordinates: 46°37′37″N 12°43′41″E

Geography
- Location within Italy
- Location: Italy
- Parent range: Carnic Alps

Monte Chiadenis (Friulian: Cjadenis) is a peak in the Carnic Alps, northern Italy, located between the comuni of Sappada and Forni Avoltri. It has an altitude of 2,459 m (8,068 ft).

During World War I (1915–1917) it was the site of fierce fighting between Italian alpini and Austrian Kaiserjäger.

In Friulian language cjadenis means "chains".

== See also ==
- War of the Mountains 1915–1918
