= Coglians =

Highest mountain in the Carnic Alps

Coglians - Hohe Warte
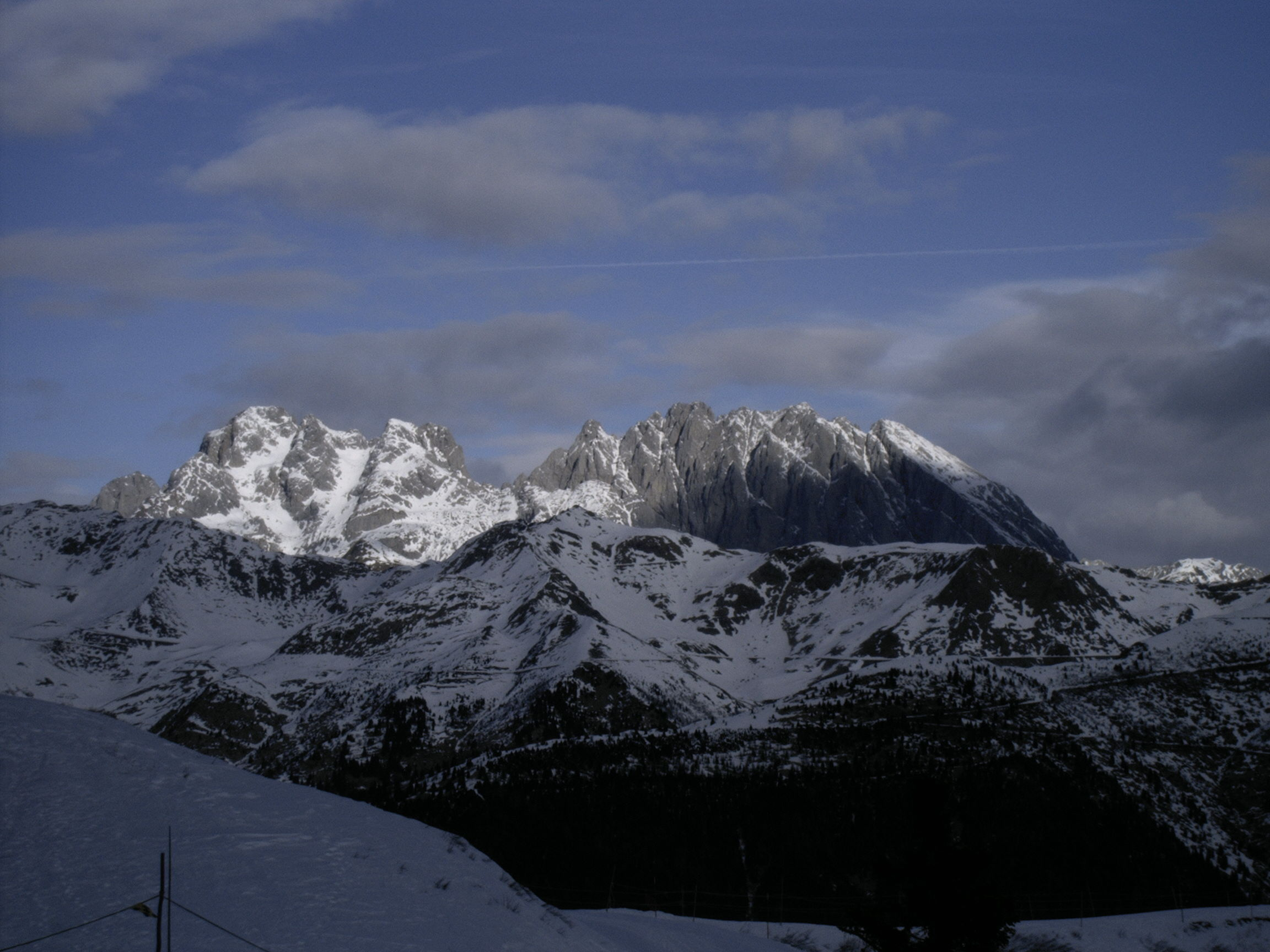
- Monte Coglians (first high peak from the left) seen from Mt. Zoncolan (south)

Highest point
- Elevation: 2,780 m (9,120 ft)
- Prominence: 1,144 m (3,753 ft)
- Coordinates: 46°36′25″N 12°53′17″E

Geography
- Location within Alps
- Location: Friuli-Venezia Giulia, Italy; Carinthia, Austria
- Parent range: Carnic Alps

Climbing
- First ascent: 30 September 1865 by Paul Grohmann from the South
- Easiest route: Hike

Monte Coglians (Friulian: Coliàns; German: Hohe Warte) is the highest mountain of the Carnic Alps, on the border between Italy (province of Udine) and Austria (Carinthia), west of the Monte Croce Carnico pass (Plöcken Pass). With its elevation of 2,780 m (9,121 ft), it is the highest peak of the Friuli-Venezia Giulia region of Italy and of the Carnic and Gailtal Alps.

Monte Coglians is characterised by karst topography.

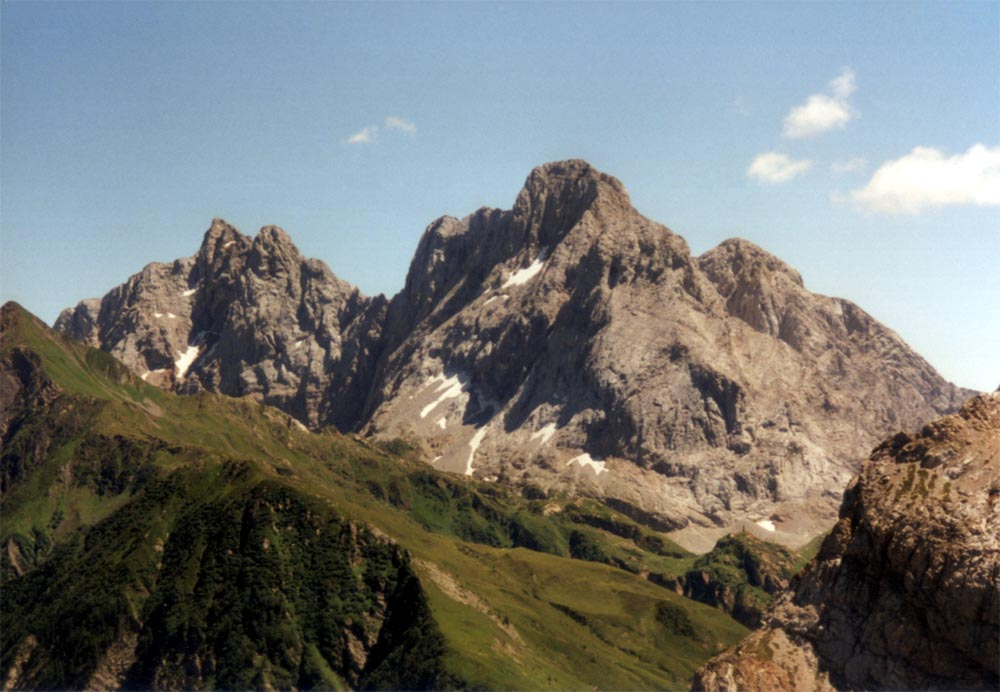
Coglians (right) as seen from the NW

== Related articles ==
- List of Italian regions by highest point
