= Venetian Plain =

Major geographical feature of Italy

The Venetian Plain, or Venetian-Friulian Plain (Italian: Pianura Veneta or Pianura Veneto-friulana) is a major geographical feature of Italy. It extends approximately from the River Adige to the River Isonzo, in a southwest-to-northeast direction, including almost all the flatlands of Veneto and Friuli. The plain is divided into high and low plains with the high plain located between Brenta and Piave rivers. It is not properly related to the Po River basin, but it is often considered as part of the Po Valley since the flatlands of Veneto and Friuli do not drain into the Po, but they effectively combine into an unbroken plain. Sometimes, instead of the River Adige, the Euganei Hills and Berici Hills are considered to be its western border.

== See also ==
- Friuli
- Po Valley
- Triveneto
- Veneto
