= Slovene Prealps =

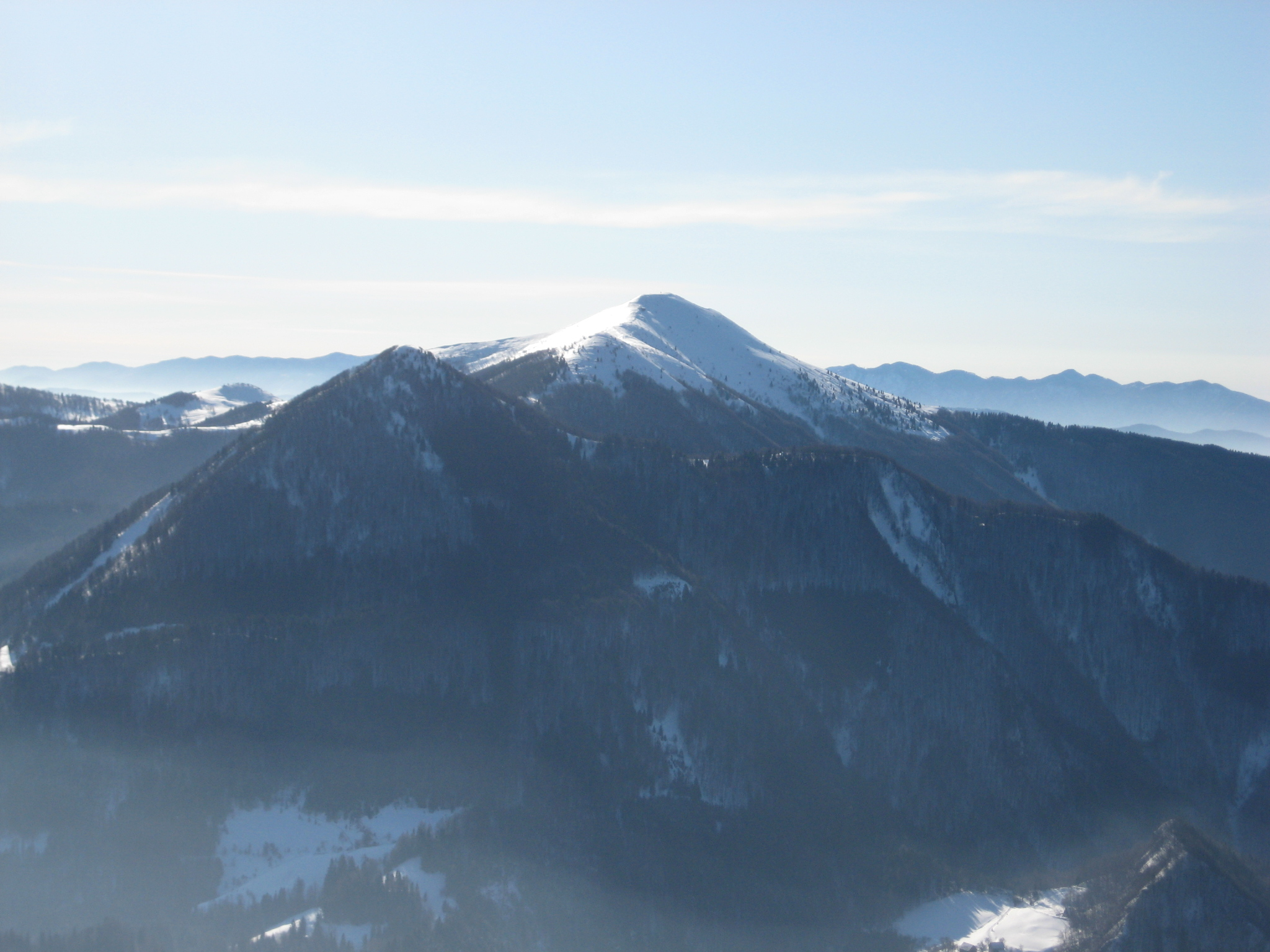
- Mount Porezen

Highest point
- Peak: Porezen
- Elevation: 1,630 m (5,350 ft)
- Coordinates: 46°10′39″N 13°58′28″E

Naming
- Native name: Slovenske Predalpe (Slovene); Predalpska Slovenija (Slovene); slovenski predalpski svet (Slovene)

Geography
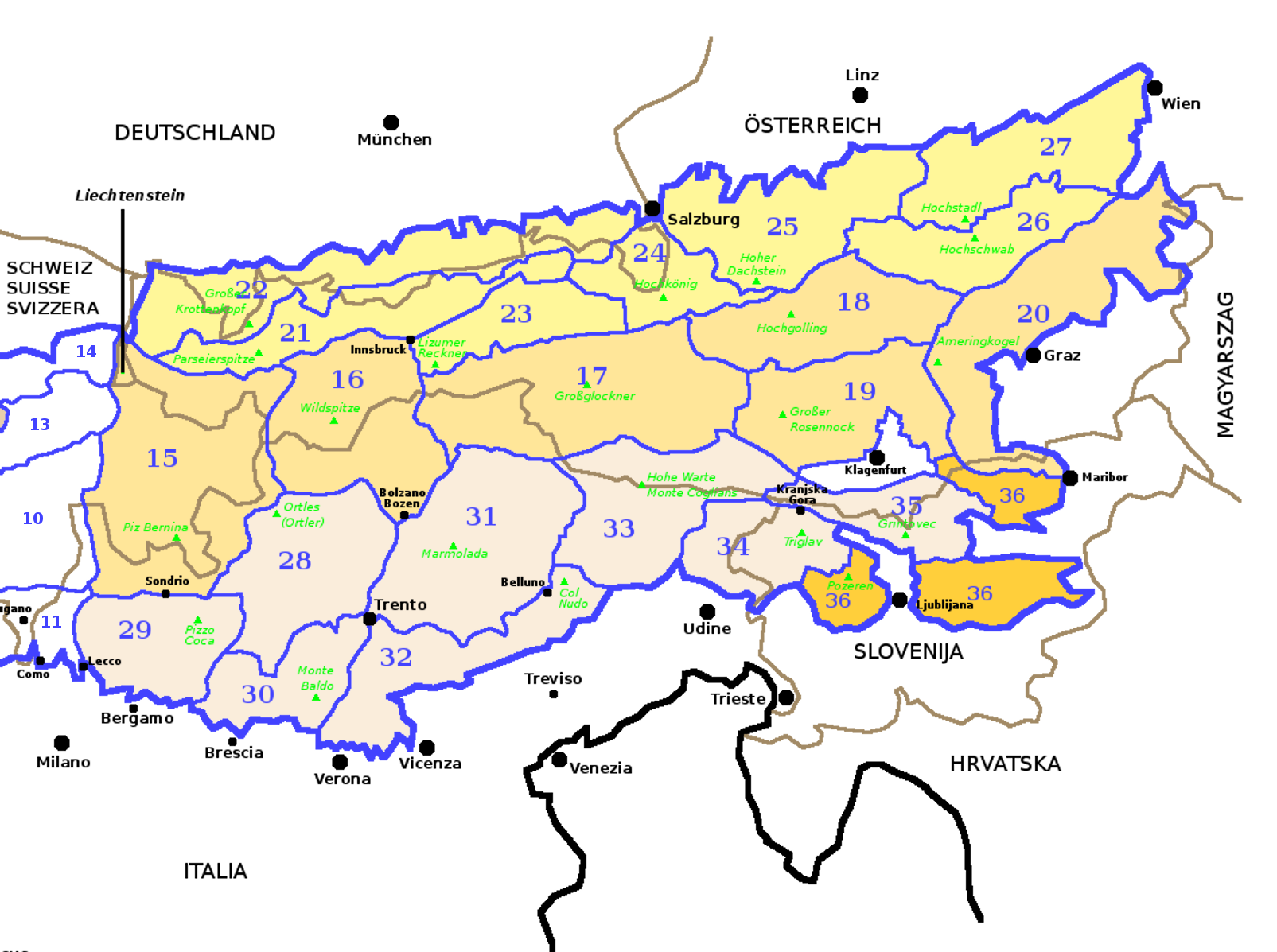
- Slovene Prealps (section no. 36) within the Eastern Alps
- Countries: Slovenia and Austria
- Parent range: Alps
- Borders on: Styrian Prealps, Carinthian-Styrian Alps, Carinthian-Slovene Alps and Julian Alps and Prealps

Geology
- Orogeny: Alpine orogeny

The Slovene Prealps or the Slovenian Prealps (Slovene: Slovenske Predalpe, Predalpska Slovenija, slovenski predalpski svet) are a group of mountain ranges in the eastern part of the Alps. They are located in Slovenia and, for a small part of their northernmost area, in Austria.

== Geography ==
=== SOIUSA classification ===
According to SOIUSA (International Standardized Mountain Subdivision of the Alps) the Slovene Prealps are an Alpine section, classified in the following way:

- main part = Eastern Alps
- major sector = Southern Limestone Alps
- section = Slovene Prealps
- code = II/C-36

=== Subdivision ===
The Slovene Prealps are divided into three non-contiguous subsections:

- Western Slovene Prealps (Sl: Zahodne Slovenske Predalpe) - SOIUSA code:II/C-36.I
- Eastern Slovene Prealps (Sl: Vzhodne Slovenske Predalpe) - SOIUSA code:II/C-36.II
- Northeastern Slovene Prealps (Sl: Severovzhodne Slovenske Predalpe) - SOIUSA code:II/C-36.III

Two of these subsections include just one Alpine supergroup, and the third one is further subdivided in two supergroups:

- Western Slovene Prealps:
  - supergroup Škofjeloško-Cerkljansko-Polhograjsko-Rovtarsko hribovje - SOIUSA code:II/C-36.I-A
- Eastern Slovene Prealps:
  - supergroup Posavsko hribovje - SOIUSA code:II/C-36.II-A
- Northeastern Slovene Prealps:
  - supergroup Strojno s Pohorskim hribovjem - SOIUSA code:II/C-36.III-A
  - supergroup Vitanjsko-Konjiško hribovje - SOIUSA code:II/C-36.III-B

== Summits ==
The chief summits of the Slovene Prealps are:

Name	metres	feet
Porezen	1,630	5,347
Črni vrh	1,543	5,062
Velika Kopa	1,542	5,059
Jezerski vrh	1,537	5,043
Mali Črni vrh	1,533	5,029
Mulejev vrh	1,533	5,029
Mala Kopa	1,524	5,000
Rogla	1,517	4,977
Žigartov vrh	1,346	4,416
Stari Vrh	1,217	3,993

== See also ==
- Prealps
