= Comelico =

Mountainous region of northeast Italy

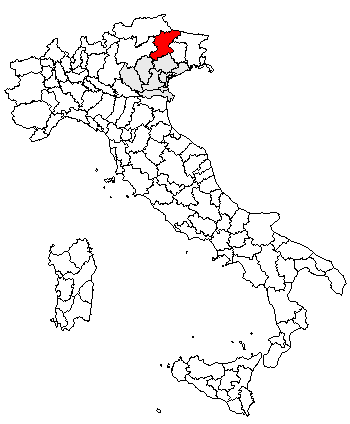
Location of the province of Belluno

Comelico (Ladin: Cumélgu, Comélgu or Comélgo; Sappada German: Komèlk; Venetian: Comelego; Friulian: Comeli) is a mountainous region of northeast Italy, close to the Austrian border.

== Geography ==
Comelico covers an area of circa 280 km^{2}. Encircled by the Dolomites and the Carnic Alps, it is covered by wide forests and meadows. Comelico comprises two main valleys, the upper part of Piave river and the valley of the Padola torrent. Other valleys are the Visdende valley and the Digon valley. The main mountains are the Popera, one of the most handsome and famous group of the Dolomites region, the long rock ridge that runs from the Tudaio mountain to the Tre Terze group and, in the north of the region, the long and sweet border crest that starts from the Monte Croce Comelico pass and ends on the Peralba mountain.

The main village is Santo Stefano di Cadore located at the junction of the Piave and the Padola rivers. The other villages included in this region are San Pietro di Cadore, Comelico Superiore and Danta di Cadore, all of which are part of the province of Belluno in the Veneto.

== History ==
It is included in the historical region of Cadore.

== Economy ==
Comelico is mainly based on cattle-breeding and tourism. Agriculture, with the exception of fodder cultivation, is poor and limited to potatoes and various vegetables for home use. The production of spectacles is another source of income for this region but, starting from the last decade of the 20th century, it has suffered a drop in the production due to lack of competitiveness.
