= Kellerspitzen =

Mountain in Italy

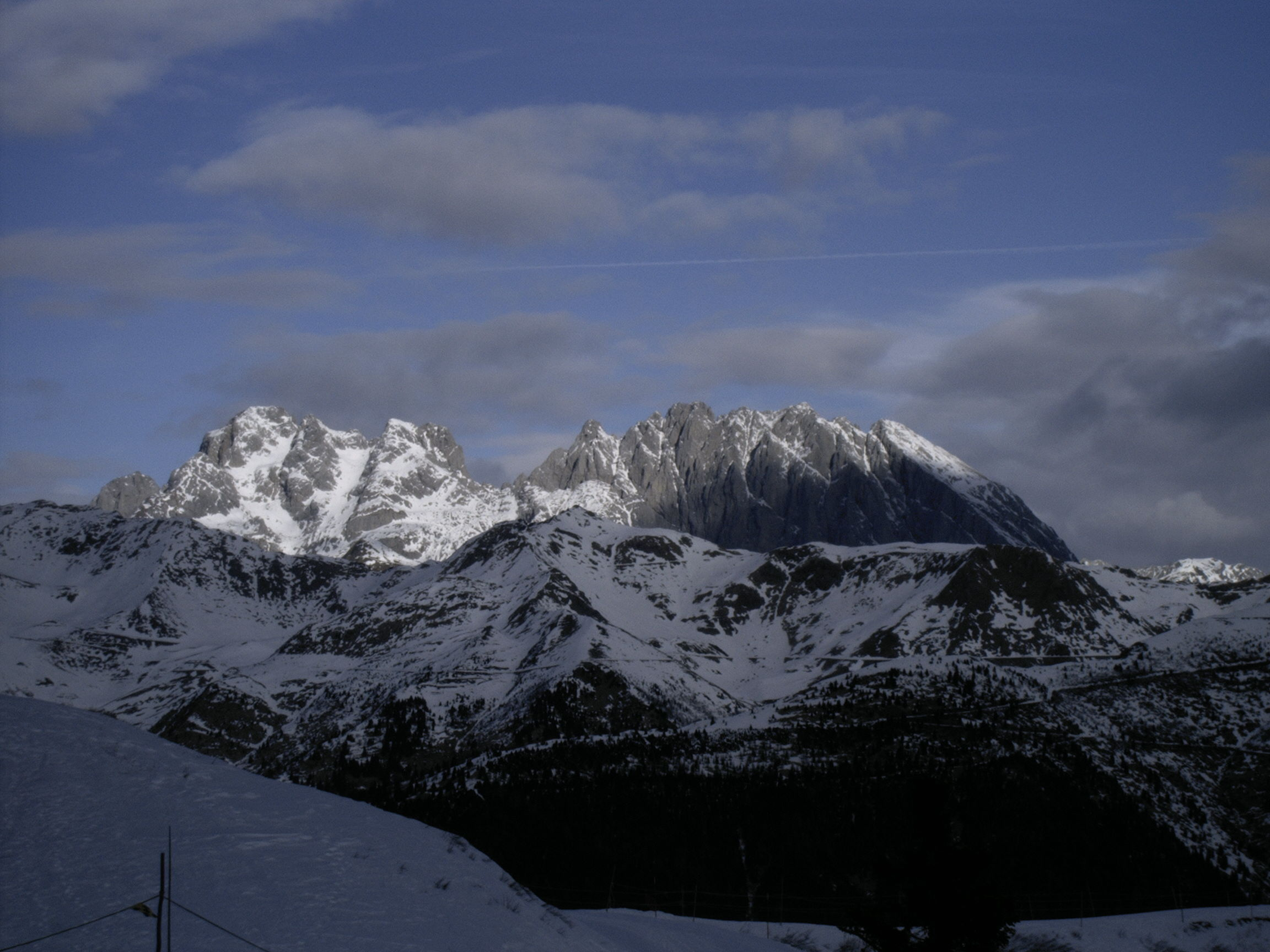
- The Hohe Warte (l) and the Kellerspitzen (r) seen from the south

Highest point
- Elevation: 2,774 m (AA) (9,101 ft)
- Prominence: 2,774-2,522 m ↓ Kellerscharte
- Isolation: 1.4 km → Hohe Warte

Geography
- Location within Austria
- Location: Carinthia, Austria and Province of Udine, Italy
- Parent range: Carnic Alps

Climbing
- First ascent: 13 July 1878 by J. Hocke and Adam Riebler,
- Normal route: From the east via the Kollinkofel

The twin peaks of the Kellerspitzen (Italian: Creta delle Chianevate) form the second highest mountain (2,774 m (AA)) in the Carnic Alps, a mountain range in the Southern Limestone Alps within both Austria and Italy. The two summits rise in the middle of the east-west oriented Kellerwandgrat, an arête that forms the main chain of the Carnic Alps here. The border between the Austrian state of Carinthia and the Italian Province of Udine runs along this ridge. The West Top (Westgipfel), also called the Grohmannspitze, is 2,718 m; the East or Main Top (Ostgipfel or Hauptgipfel) is 2,774 m. The mountain offers a wide panoramic view in all directions which, along with its numerous climbing routes, makes it a popular destination for mountaineers.

== History ==
Since the 1860s, there were different views among Austrian, German and Italian alpinists as to whether the Kellerspitzen or the Hohe Warte (Monte Coglians) was the highest mountain in the Carnic Alps. Paul Grohmann, the geologist and palaeontologist Fritz Frech from Breslau and Georg Geyer from Vienna claimed the Kellerspitzen, shown on the Austrian map with a height of 2,813 metres, was the highest summit; the Italians Giovanni Marinelli and Arturo Ferrucci from the Italian Alpine Club, by contrast, favoured the Hohe Warte, which was marked on the Tavolette 1:50,000, Prato Carnico map with a height of 2,782. Today it is believed that the Hohe Warte, at 2,780 metres, is the highest mountain in the region, beating the Kellerspitzen by around 6 metres.

According to German language literature the Kellerspitzen West Top was climbed on 15 July 1868 by Paul Grohmann, guided by Josef Moser from Kötschach and Peter Salcher from Luggau in the Lesach valley. They set off on 14 July from the Plöcken Pass, climbed up to the Obere Collinalpe and bivouacked at a height of about 2,000 metres to the north of and below the Grüne Schneide. Their route continued through the Eiskar to the summit ridge. The group only reached the lower West Top, however, a breaking storm prevented their crossing to the East Top. On 31 July 1877 L. Pitacco, Pietro Galante and A. Menchini failed at the Kollinkofel. Not until 13 July 1878 did Giovanni Hocke of the Società Alpina Friulana (today the Udine Branch of the IAC), together with Adam Riebler, a master locksmith and mountain guide from Mauthen, succeed in conquering the East Top, which they reached via the Kollinkofel. They returned the same way. The crossing from the East to the West Top was first achieved on 29 August by the aristocratic brothers, Guido and Cesare Mantica, with their guide, Nicolò Silverio from Timau. They also initially climbed the Kollinkofel. On the West Top they found Grohmann's visiting card under a cairn. On the descent they followed Grohmann's route down to the Eiskar. Thereafter the mountains on the Kellerwandgrat were visited time and again.

In the mountain war of 1915–1918 the static front between Austria and Italy ran through here. The region still has numerous remains of military positions and trenches; the old supply route between the peaks of the Kellerspitzen makes a crossing easy for today's visitors.

== Geography ==
The Kellerspitzen have only a few immediately important neighbours. To the west, along the Kellerwandgrat arête and separated by the Kellerscharte col at 2,524 m, are the 2,713-metre-high Kellerwarte (Cima di Mezzo), then the Hohe Warte, at 2,780 metres the highest mountain of the Carnic Alps, and to the east lies the Kollinkofel (Creta di Collina). To the north, towards the Valentin valley, the twin peaks drop almost vertically in an 800-metre-high rock face. The south face drops about 500 metres to the Keller (La Chiavenate), a bowl-shaped gravel cirque. The nearest significant settlements are, on the Italian side, Timau in the Val Grande, which lies about 9 kilometres away to the east as the crow flies and Kötschach-Mauthen, 10 kilometres to the northeast. The Plöcken Pass Road runs by about 3.5 kilometres to the east.

== Literature and maps ==
- Peter Holl: Alpine Club Guide Karnischer Hauptkamm, Bergverlag Rother, Munich, 1988, ISBN 3-7633-1254-4
- Carl Diener: Die Karnischen Alpen in Eduard Richter: Die Erschliessung der Ostalpen, Berlin, 1894
- Casa Editrice Tabacco, Carta topografica 1:25,000, Sheet 09, Alpi Carniche, Carnia Centrale
