= Monte Brentoni =

Mountain in Italy

Monte Brentonti
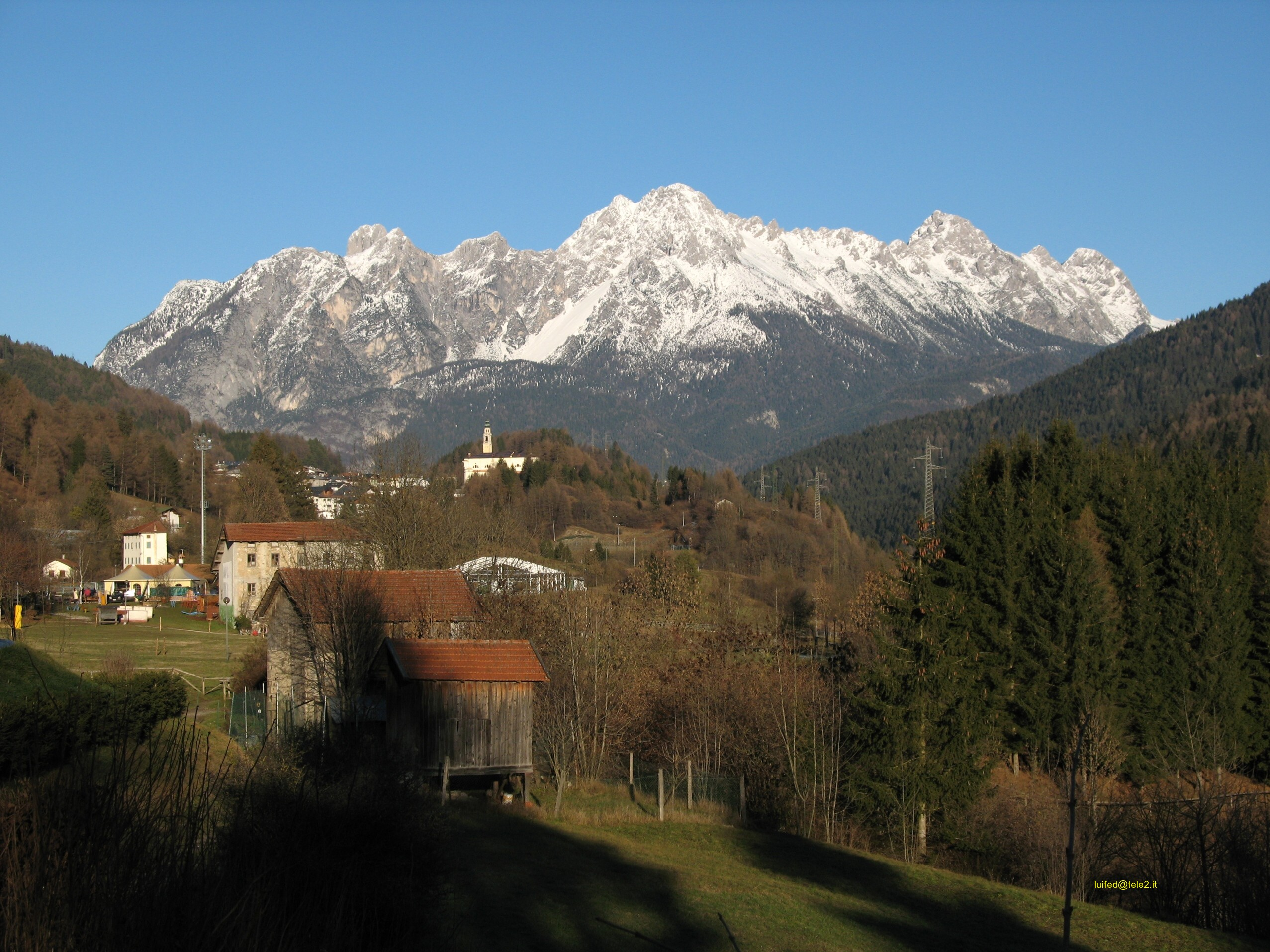
- Monte Brentonti view from Valle di Cadore

Highest point
- Elevation: 2,548 m (8,360 ft)
- Prominence: 1,017 m (3,337 ft)
- Coordinates: 46°31′N 12°34′E

Geography
- Location within Alps
- Location: Veneto, Italy
- Parent range: Carnic Alps

Climbing
- First ascent: 1898

Monte Brentonti (2,548 m) is a mountain of the Carnic Alps in the Belluno in Veneto, north-eastern Italy. It is the second highest peak of the Southern Carnics after Monte Terza Grande, and like its higher neighbour, is a Dolomitic mountain, being separated by the main Dolomite range only by the River Piave.

Its position on the border between two of the main Alpine ranges provides the summit of Monte Brentonti with a fantastic panorama of the Carnics and the Julian Alps to the north and east and the Dolomites to the south and west. It is usually climbed from the pass of Sella Ciampigotto to the south.
