= Monte Tudaio =

Mountain in Italy

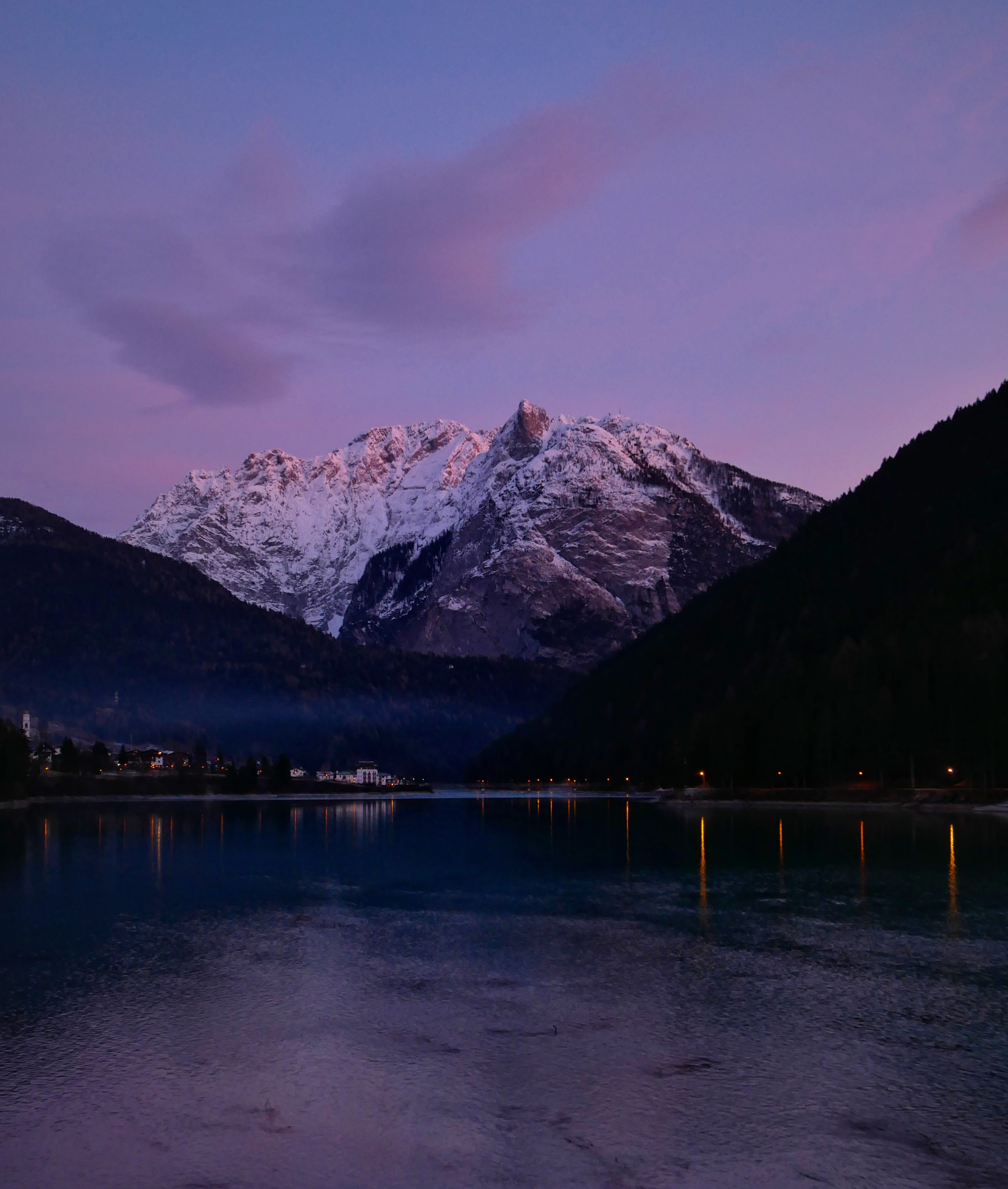
- Monte Tudaio seen from Lake Auronzo

Highest point
- Elevation: 2,140 m (7,020 ft)
- Coordinates: 46°31′11″N 12°29′49″E

Geography
- Location: Veneto, Italy
- Parent range: Carnic Alps

Monte Tudaio is a mountain of the Carnic Alps, in northeastern Italy, with an elevation of 2,140 meters.

== Details ==
Part of the Brentoni mountain range, Monte Tudaio is located in the territory of Vigo di Cadore, in the province of Belluno, Veneto, overlooking the upper Piave valley and the Val d'Ansiei.

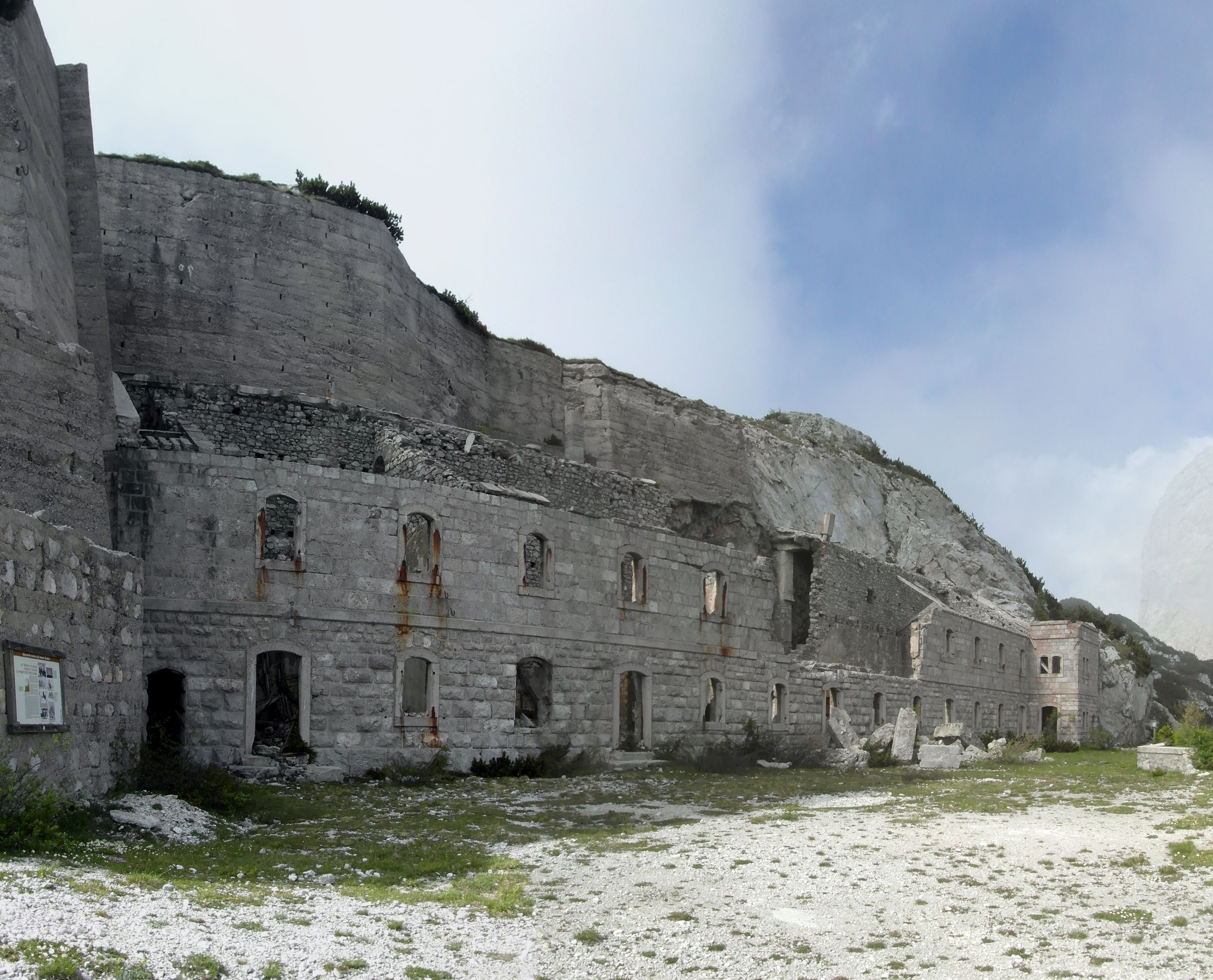
Forte Tudaio

Due to its commanding position, which enabled control over the Mauria Pass and the Kreuzberg Pass, a fortress (Forte Tudaio) was built atop the mountain shortly before the First World War; in early November 1917, the fortress tried to slow down the advance of the Austro-Hungarian troops after the battle of Caporetto but then had to be abandoned and fell into the hands of the Habsburg troops, who blew it up at the end of the war.

The peak can be reached on the old military road from Piniè, a hamlet of Vigo di Cadore, or with a difficult hiking path starting from the same village.
