= Polinik =

Polinik may refer to:

- Mölltaler Polinik, 2,784 m, a mountain in the Kreuzeck group, Austria
- Gailtaler Polinik, 2,332 m, a mountain in the Carnic Alps
