= Trogkofel =

Mountain in Austria and Italy

- Creta di Aip
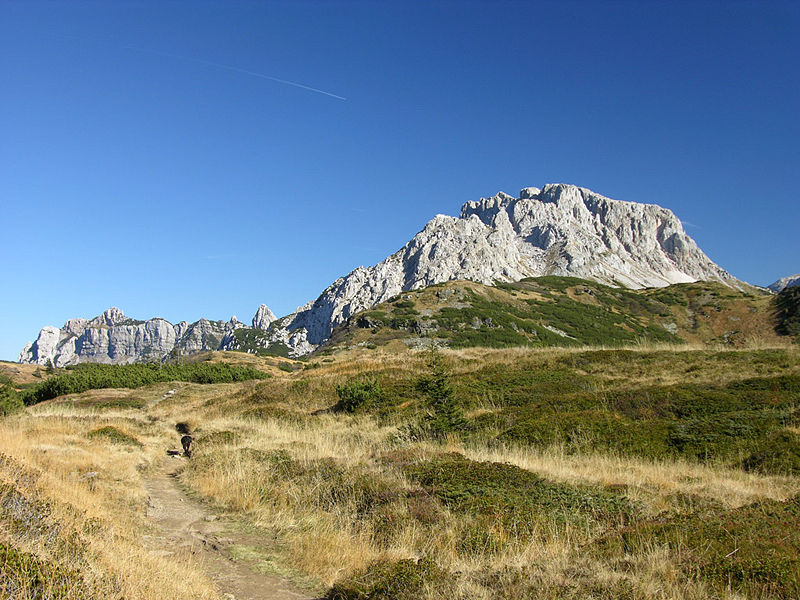
- Trogkofel

Highest point
- Elevation: 2,280 m (7,480 ft)
- Prominence: 736 m (2,415 ft)
- Coordinates: 46°34′N 13°13′E

Geography
- Location within Alps
- Location: Friuli, Italy and Carinthia, Austria
- Parent range: Carnic Alps

Trogkofel (Creta di Aip in Italian) (2,280 m) is a mountain of the Carnic Alps lying on the border of Friuli, Italy and Carinthia, Austria. It is located on the main ridge of the Carnics between the Aip Valley to the south and the Gail Valley in the north, and is the second highest mountain on the eastern ridge after Gailtaler Polinik. The mountain is known as Crete Rosse, meaning Red Rocky Mountain in Friuli.

== Climbing ==
The first recorded ascent took place in 1886 although it is very likely that local hunters reached the summit way before then. The mountain can be climbed with a moderate level of difficulty from all directions. Due to the isolated position of the peak, and its prominence over neighbouring peaks, the summit offers a panoramic view, which includes all of the Carnics, the Dolomites, the Julian Alps, the Gailtal Alps and the High Tauern.
