= Creta Forata =

Mountain in Italy

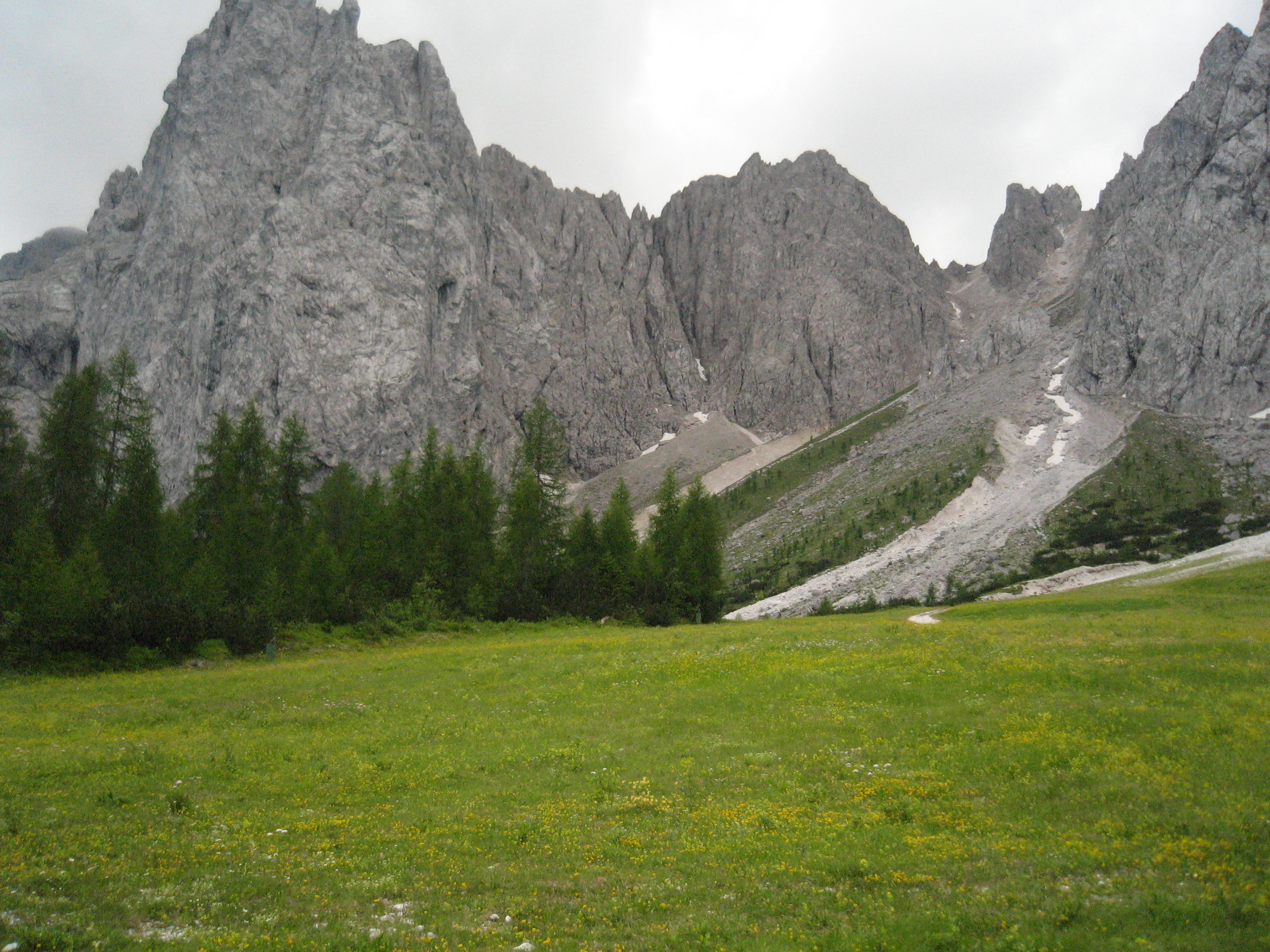

Highest point
- Elevation: 2,462 m (8,077 ft)
- Prominence: 857 m (2,812 ft)
- Coordinates: 46°32′N 12°44′E

Geography
- Location within Alps
- Location: Veneto and Friuli, Italy
- Parent range: Carnic Alps

Creta Forata (Crete Forade in Friulian) is a mountain of the Carnic Alps that lies on the border of Veneto and Friuli, northeast Italy, with an elevation of 2,462 m. It is located near the village of Sappada in the Piave Valley. Formed of limestone, it is the highest mountain of the eastern Terza - Siera Group and boasts a twin summit. It is of a similarly rugged nature as the Dolomites to the west.
