= Monte Cavallino =

Mountain in Italy

- Große Kinigat
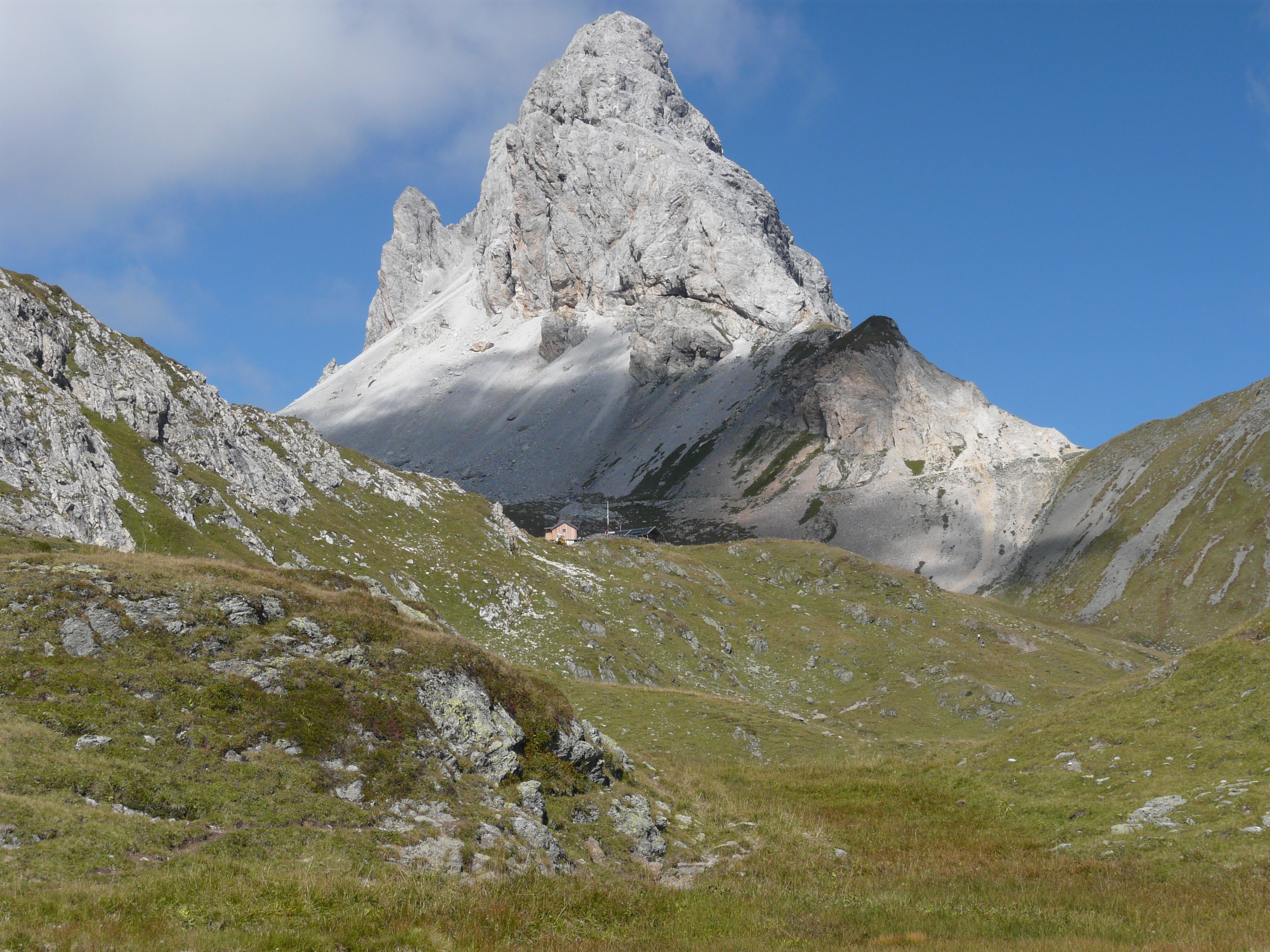
- The Königswand of Monte Cavallino/Große Kinigat seen from the southeast over the de:Filmoor-Standschützenhütte

Highest point
- Elevation: 2,689 m (8,822 ft)
- Prominence: 594 m (1,949 ft)
- Coordinates: 46°40′32″N 12°31′27″E

Geography
- Location within Alps
- Location: Lienz District, Tyrol, Austria; Province of Belluno, Italy
- Parent range: Carnic Alps

Climbing
- First ascent: 21 July 1898 by Anton Victorin and Peter Tassenbacher

Monte Cavallino (Italian) or Große Kinigat (German) is, after Monte Coglians/Hohe Warte and Peralba/Hochweißstein the third-highest mountain in the Carnic Alps. It has twin summits, the lower one, Königswand (2686), being 250 m to the southeast of the higher summit. Following the main ridge to the west are, after a 2515 m pass, the Kleine Kinigat/Monte Cavallatto (2674 m) and Pfannspitze/Cima Vanscuro (2678 m).

The normal route is a 2.5 hour hike from the Obstanser-See-Hütte, crossing over to the Italian site and over the south face. The first recorded ascent was very late for an alpine summit (1898) and was made via the (south)east ridge of the Königswand (UIAA scale II-III). The 500 m high northeast face offers rock climbs up to UIAA scale VI+.

The area around Kinigat and nearby Rosskopf, north of Pfannspitze, was placed for sale in 2011. The Austrian government suspended the sale in June after widespread criticism from the general public. The government had hoped to raise up to 121,000 euros from the sale.
