= Cabia =

Frazione of Arta Terme, Friuli, Italy

Coordinates: 46°28′N 13°2′E

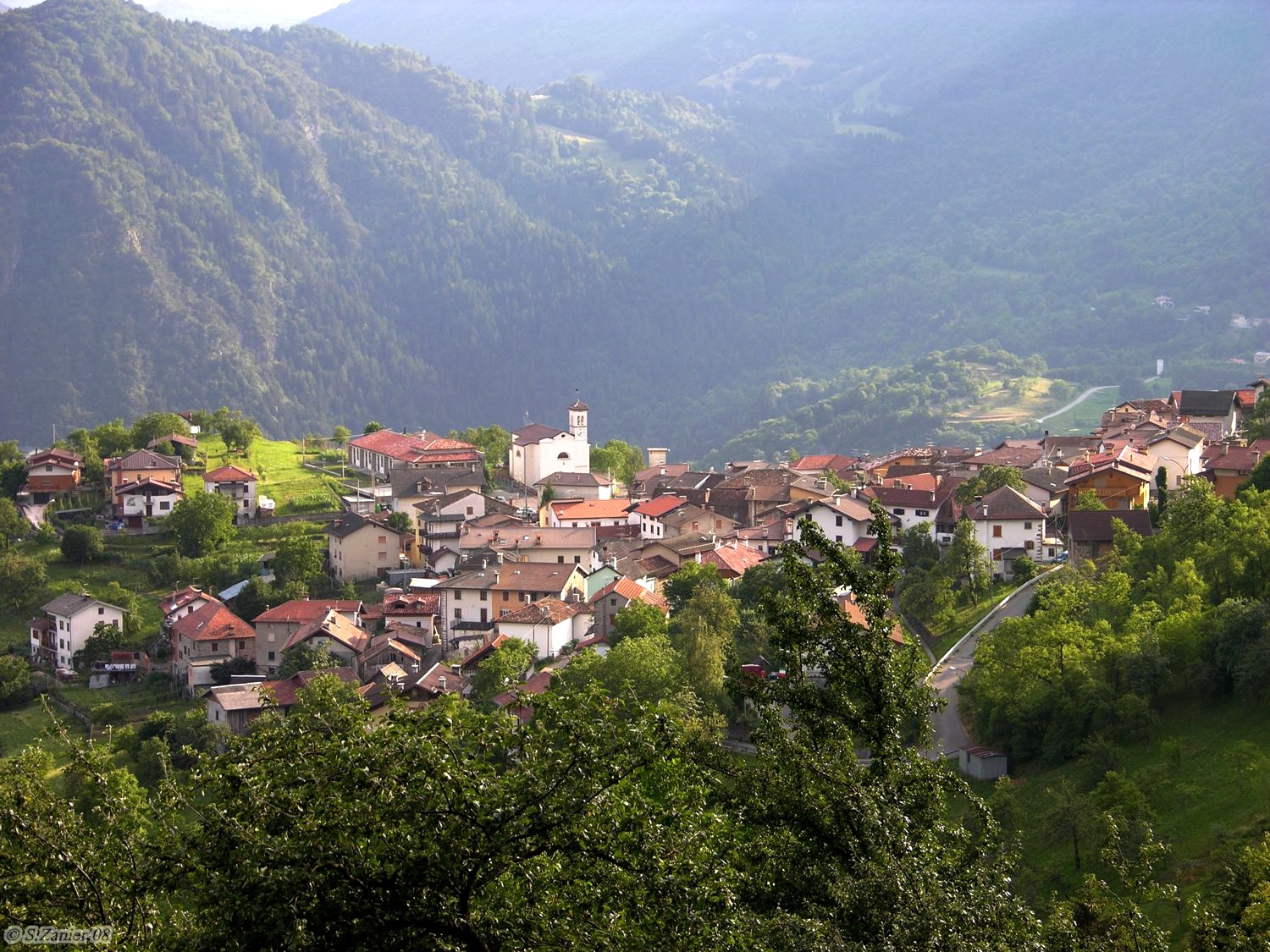
View of Cabia.

Cabia (Friulian: Cjabie) is a frazione of the comune of Arta Terme, Friuli, north-eastern Italy, in the Carnia traditional region. It is a village located at 753 m across the Valle di Incarojo and the Val Bût, near the Monte Sernio, the Monte Amarana and the valley of Tolmezzo.

The population is some 280.
