= Arta Terme =

Arta Terme Darte (Friulian)
- Comune
- Comune di Arta Terme
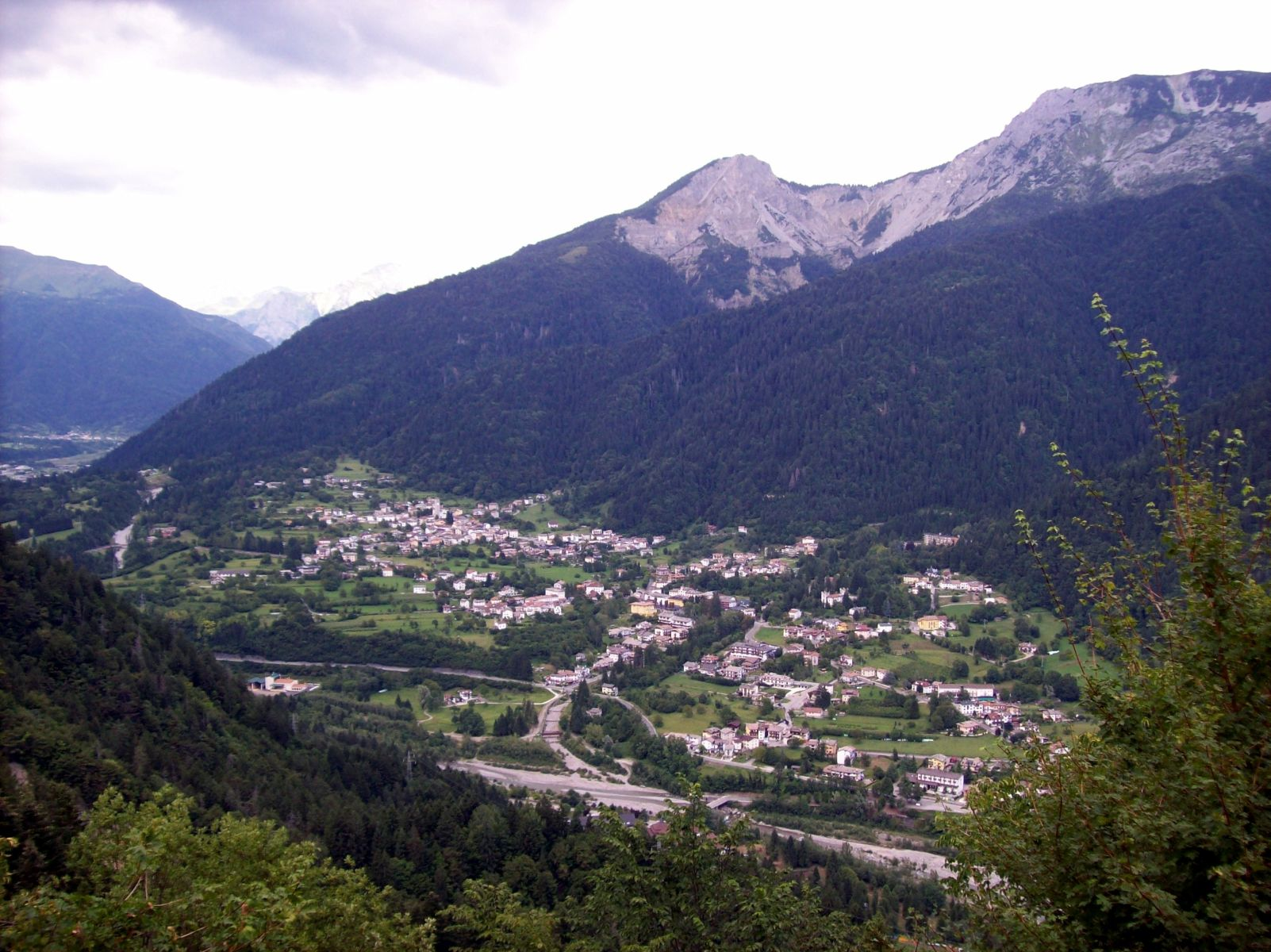

- Coat of arms

- Location of Arta Terme in Italy Arta Terme (Friuli-Venezia Giulia)
- Coordinates: 46°29′N 13°1′E
- Country: Italy
- Region: Friuli-Venezia Giulia
- Province: Udine (UD)
- Frazioni: Avosacco, Cabia, Cedarchis, Lovea, Piano d'Arta, Piedim, Rivalpo, Valle

Government
  - Mayor: Luigi Gonano

Area
  - Total: 52.7 km^{2} (20.3 sq mi)
- Elevation: 422 m (1,385 ft)

Population (28 February 2017)
  - Total: 2,102
  - Density: 39.9/km^{2} (103/sq mi)
- Demonym: Artesi
- Time zone: UTC+1 (CET)
  - Summer (DST): UTC+2 (CEST)
- Postal code: 33022
- Dialing code: 0433
- Patron saint: Sts. Hermacoras and Fortunatus
- Saint day: July 12
- Website: Official website

Arta Terme (Friulian: Darte) is a comune (municipality) in the Regional decentralization entity of Udine in the Italian region of Friuli-Venezia Giulia, located about 110 kilometres (68 mi) northwest of Trieste and about 50 kilometres (31 mi) northwest of Udine in the Val Bût, part of the Alpine traditional region of Carnia.

== Main sights ==
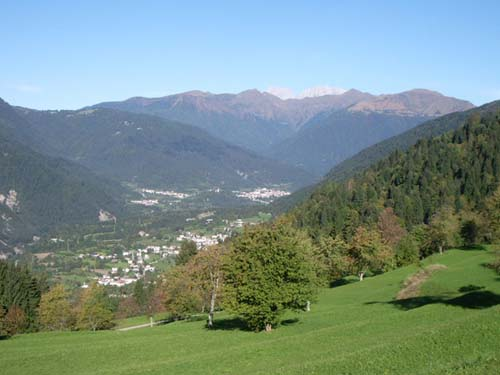
View of the town

- Church of Santo Spirito (15th century)
- Church of San Nicolò (15th century)

== Twin towns ==
Arta Terme is twinned with:

- Noale, Italy
