= Monte Bìvera =

Mountain in Italy

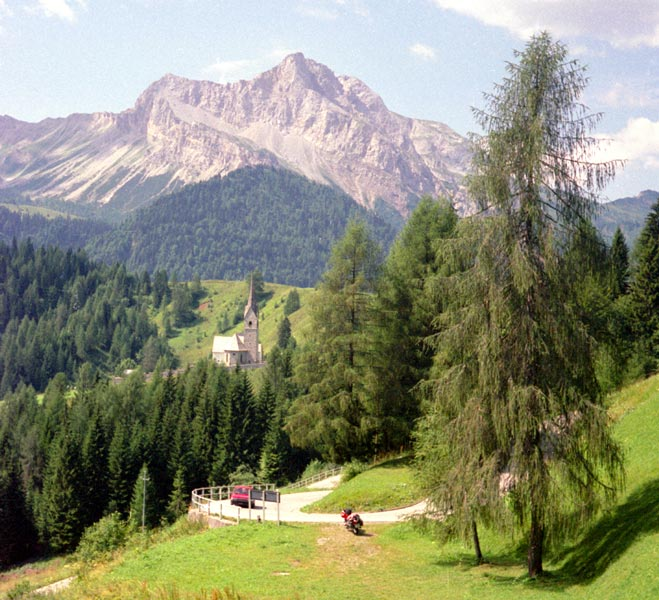
- Monte Bìvera

Highest point
- Elevation: 2,474 m (8,117 ft)
- Prominence: 696 m (2,283 ft)
- Coordinates: 46°26′N 12°39′E

Geography
- Location within Alps
- Location: Friuli, Italy
- Parent range: Carnic Alps

Monte Bìvera (2,474 m) is a mountain of the Carnic Alps in Friuli, northeast Italy. It lies south of the main chain of the Carnics, north of the Tagliamento River and above the resort of Forni di Sopra. It is a twin peaked mountain, with the slightly lower Clapsavon (2,462 m) just to the west, and it is formed of Limestone. A popular mountain to climb, from its summit many of the giants of the Dolomites can be seen to the West, the mighty Großvenediger to the north and the Julian Alps in the east.
