= Rosskopf (Carnic Alps) =

Coordinates: 46.68479°N 12.50176°E

Roßkopf
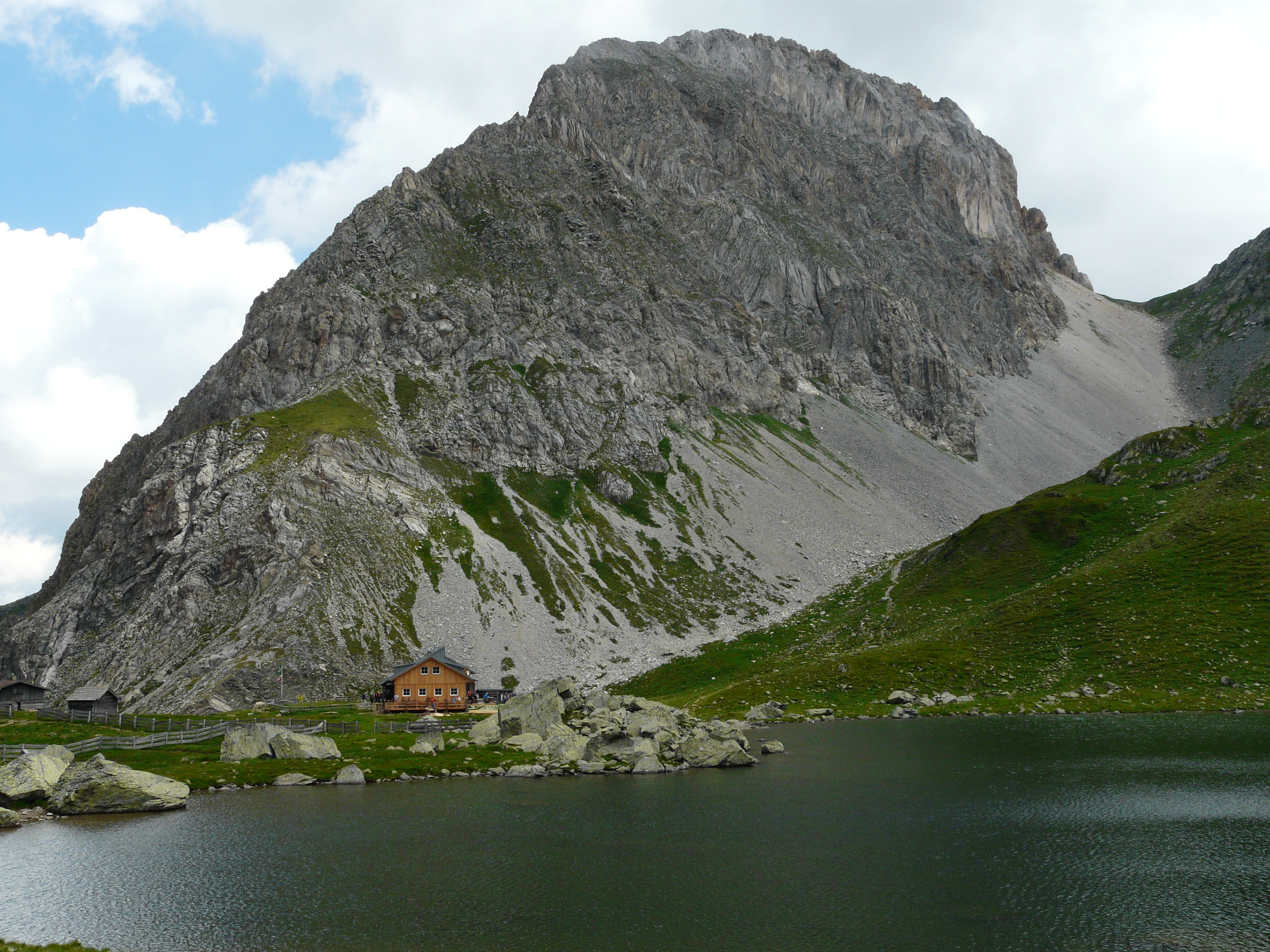

Highest point
- Elevation: 2,603 metres (8,540 ft)

Geography
- Location: Austria
- Parent range: Carnic Alps

Roßkopf or Rosskopf is a peak in the Carnic Alps of Austria, near the boundary with Italy. On June 10, 2011, the Austrian Government offered it and nearby peak Grosse Kinigat for sale for €121,000. The parcel of land is approximately 1,000,000 square metres (250 acres), and the purchaser will not be able to restrict others' right of way on the property.
