= Verduzzo =

Variety of grape

- Grape (Vitis)
- Color of berry skin: Blanc
- Species: Vitis vinifera
- Also called: Verduzzo Friulano; Ramandolo
- Origin: Northeast Italy
- Notable regions: Friuli-Venezia Giulia
- Notable wines: Ramandolo
- Formation of seeds: Complete
- Sex of flowers: Hermaphrodite
- VIVC number: 12976

Verduzzo (or Verduzzo Friulano) is a white Italian wine grape grown predominantly in the Friuli-Venezia Giulia region of northeast Italy. It is also found in significant plantings in the Piave Denominazione di origine controllata (DOC) of the Veneto region, though some of these plantings may be of the separate Verduzzo Trevigiano variety. Verduzzo Friulano is used in varietal and blended wines, many of which fall under DOC as well as vino da tavola designations, that range in style from dry to late harvest wines. According to wine expert Oz Clarke, most of the sweeter examples of Verduzzo can be found in the Friuli-Venezia Giulia with the grape being used for progressively drier styles of the wine the further west into the Veneto.

The grape is widely associated with the Denominazione di origine controllata e Garantita (DOCG) wine of Ramandolo which gained DOCG status in 2001. It is also often seen in the DOC wines from the Colli Orientali del Friuli. Wine expert Karen MacNeil has stated that the Verduzzo-based Ramandolo is one of the "lightest-bodied, most exquisite dessert wines made anywhere".

According to wine writers Joe Bastianich and David Lynch, Verduzzo has the potential to produce honeyed sweet wines with a citrus note similar to "an orange jelly candy" as well as somewhat tannic dry whites with "chalky" notes.

== History ==
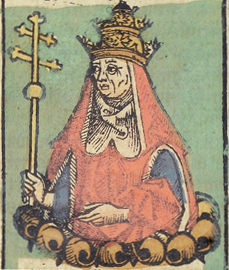
The earliest written account of Verduzzo dates back to a 1409 document detailing the wines served at a banquet in Friuli for Pope Gregory XII (pictured).

Verduzzo has a long history in northeast Italy with the first written record of the grape dating back to June 6, 1409, in a listing of wines served at a banquet in Cividale del Friuli in honor of Pope Gregory XII. According to the account, a Verduzzo wine from the commune of Faedis in the Udine province was served along with a Ramandolo from the Torlano frazione of Nimis. Considering that Ramandolo is a primary synonym of Verduzzo and the modern Denominazione di origine controllata e Garantita (DOCG) sweet dessert wine from the region is made solely from Verduzzo, it is likely both wines mentioned in the document came from the same grape with potentially one wine being a drier style and the other sweet.

== Viticulture ==
The Verduzzo vine tends to thrive on hillside vineyard locations that have good exposure to the sun which gives this mid to late-ripening variety ample time to achieve full physiological ripeness. The grape tends to be very resistant to botrytis and bunch rot which lends itself well to the production of late harvest wines.

== Wine regions ==
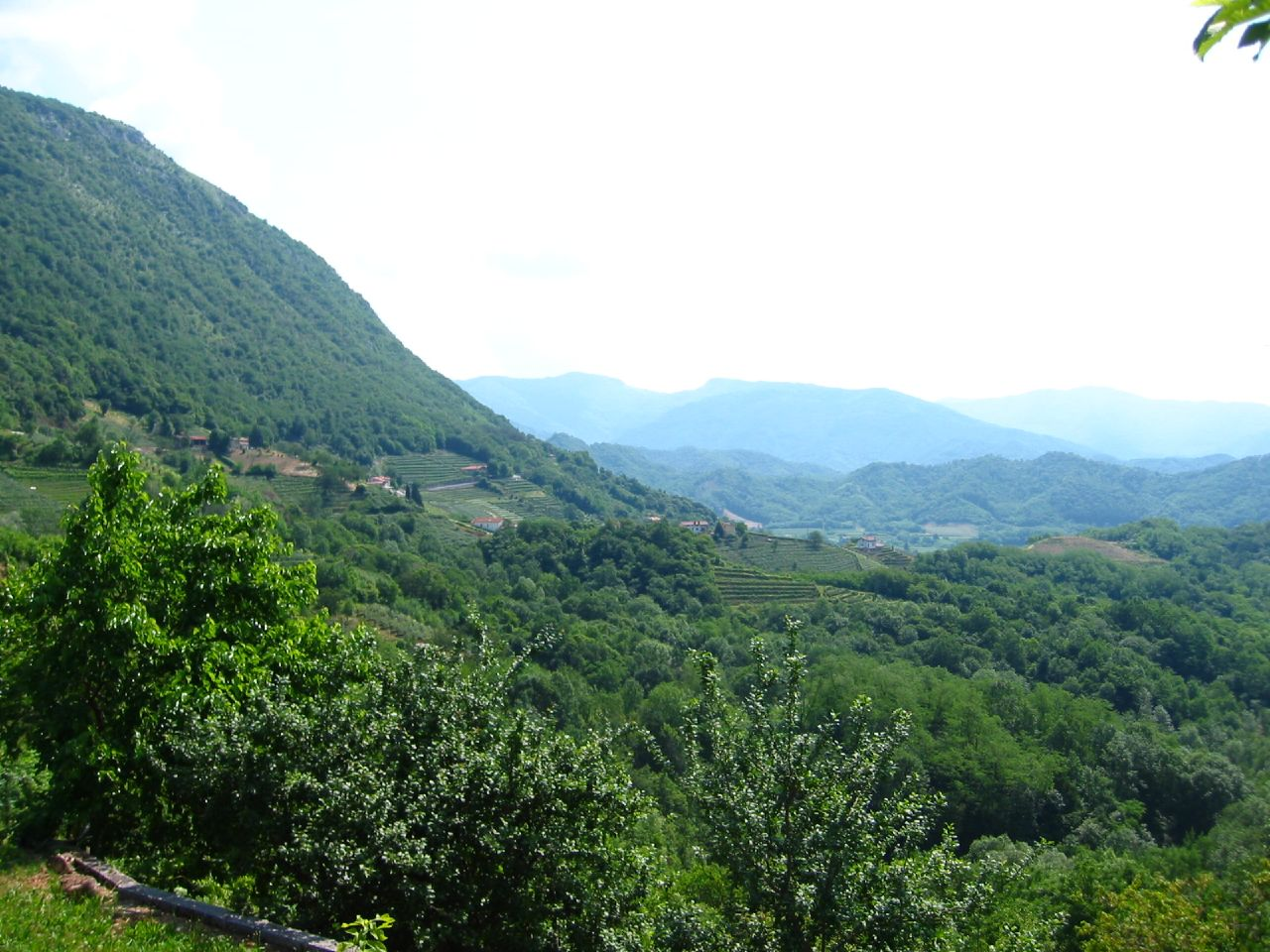
Vineyards in the Ramandolo region where Verduzzo is grown

While for most of the 20th century plantings of Verduzzo were on the decline, there were still 1658 hectares (4,097 acres) planted throughout Italy in 2000. The majority of these plantings were found in the eastern province of Udine in the Friuli-Venezia Giulia region, particularly around the communes of Nimis, Faedis, Torlano and Tarcento which have all had a long history associated with the grape. Outside of Friuli, significant plantings of Verduzzo can also be found in the Veneto along the banks of the Piave river and around the town of Pramaggiore.

Verduzzo is permitted in several of the Friuli DOCs-Colli Orientali del Friuli, Friuli Annia, Friuli Aquileia, Friuli Grave, Friuli Isonzo and Friuli Latisana as well as the overlapping Lison Pramaggiore DOC that extends into the Veneto. It is also grown in the Collio Goriziano DOC zone, however, it is not a permitted variety and wines made from this grape are labeled as vino da tavola.

Also within the Veneto, Verduzzo is authorized for the Piave DOC. Within the Colli Orientali del Friuli, the grape is used to make sweet wines in the Ramandolo DOCG. In Ramandolo, the grape is mostly commonly found on the steep hills that sit around 380 meters (1,250 feet) above sea level that circle the commune of Nimis.

=== DOC requirements ===
Verduzzo is grown throughout the Friuli-Venezia Giulia but most plantings are found in the Udine province.

Outside of Ramandolo, most of the DOC wine produced by Verduzzo are labeled under the Friuli Grave and Colli Orientali del Friuli designations. Under Italian wine law, each DOC has its own specification for how each grape variety can be used in order for the DOC name to appear on the wine label. For example, in the Friuli Aquileia DOC, Verduzzo can be produced as a varietally labeled wine provided it makes up at least 85% of the blend from grapes that have been harvested at a yield no greater than 12 tonnes/hectare and the finished wine attains a minimum alcohol level of at least 11%.

In the Colli Orientali del Friuli, a varietal Verduzzo can be made with at least 90% of the variety and other local white grape varieties such as Friulano (Sauvignon vert), Ribolla Gialla, Pinot bianco, Pinot grigio, Sauvignon blanc, Riesling Renano and Picolit permitted to fill in the remainder. (Other Friuli DOCs will often add Chardonnay, Malvasia, Müller-Thurgau, Riesling Italico and Traminer Aromatico to the list.) Any grapes used must be limited to a maximum harvest yield of 11 tonnes/ha with the finished Verduzzo wine having a minimum alcohol level of at least 12%.

Varietal Verduzzo in Friuli Annia, Friuli Aquileia and Friuli Isonzo must be made a 100% of the variety. In Annia, grapes must be harvested at no more than 12 tonnes/ha with a finished alcohol level of 10.5% while higher yields and lower alcohol levels are permitted in Aquileia and Isonzo (14 tonnes/ha with 10% APV and 13 tonnes with 10.5% APV respectively). In all three DOCs, Verduzzo can also be used in the DOC white blend with no limit on percentage under the same yield and alcohol level restrictions respectively. Aquileia does allow for a special Superiore bottling for its varietal Verduzzo with a higher minimum alcohol level of 11% while Isonzo also allows for a slightly sparkling frizzante style. The Isonzo DOC also produces a late-harvest white blend labelled as Vendemmia Tardiva that can feature Verduzzo along with Friulano, Pinot bianco and Chardonnay.

In Friuli Grave, the varietal requirement is at least 85% with yield restrictions of 13 tonnes/ha and minimum alcohol level of 11% or 12% for Superiore bottling. Verduzzo harvested at slightly higher yields (up to 14 tonnes/ha) and with a lower alcohol level of at least 10.5% is permitted for use in the general DOC white blend. Friuli Latisana has a similar 85% varietal requirement and yield restriction but a slightly lower minimum alcohol requirement of 10.5%. The Latisana DOC is also notable for its recent experimentation on many of its white wines, including Verduzzo, with barrel aging.

While nearly all the Friuli DOCs specify the Friuliano variety as the only permitted Verduzzo, the DOC regulations for the Veneto DOCs Piave and Lison-Pramaggiore (which is partially in Friuli) either don't specify which Verduzzo variety or allow for the use of Verduzzo Trevigiano grape. In the Lison-Pramaggiore DOC both a still varietal and sparkling Spumante style Verduzzo can be produced if the grape accounts for at least 90% of the blend with a yield restriction of 13 tonnes/ha and minimum alcohol level of 11%. In Piave the varietal percentage is 95% with yields limited to 12 tonnes/ha and minimum alcohol level of 11%.

=== Ramandolo ===
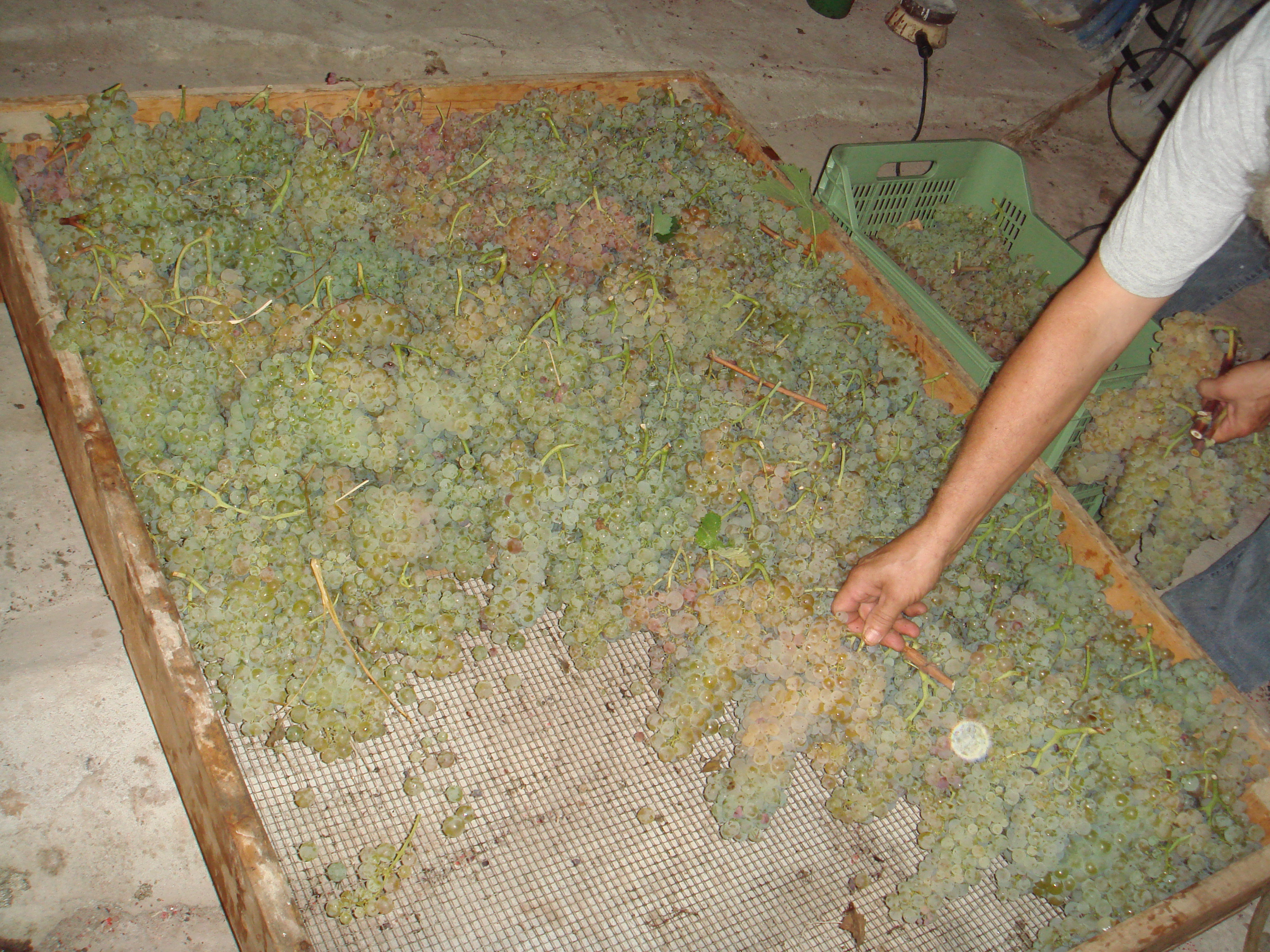
Often in the production of Ramandolo, Verduzzo grapes will be laid out to dry after harvest (similar to these Trebbiano grapes pictured) to further concentrate the sugars.

One of the most notable examples of Verduzzo is the 100% varietal wine made from this DOCG region located in the northern reaches of the Udine province in the hills above the town of Nimis. Here grapes are limited to a harvest yield no greater than 10 tonnes/ha with the grapes allowed to hang on the vine late in the season and may even receive extra drying after picking. This allows for a greater concentration of sugar which leaves a wine with noticeable residual sweetness even with the high minimum alcohol level of 14%.

Wine expert Peter Saunders describes well made examples of Ramandolo from favorable vintages as fragrant, full-bodied, slightly tannic and not too sweet. Karen MacNeil describes Ramandolo as having a copper sheen to its deep yellow color with herbal notes.

=== Outside of Italy ===
Outside of Italy there are small plantings of Verduzzo in neighboring Slovenia with 4.15 hectares (10 acres) documented in 2009 in the Goriška Brda (Gorizia Hills) region that borders the province of Gorizia in Friuli-Venezia Giulia.

In Australia, a Victorian wine producer in King Valley has been experimenting with the grape producing both dry and sweet varietal styles.

As of December 21, 2012, Verduzzo was not an approved grape variety name permitted for use on American wine labels by the Alcohol and Tobacco Tax and Trade Bureau (TTB). This does not mean that a vineyard in the United States can not grow the variety but any winemaker wishing to make a varietal Verduzzo or put the variety in a blend with the grape listed on the label will need to first to demonstrate its use in the United States for wine production which no current American winery has yet done.

== Wine ==
Verduzzo has the potential to create a wide variety of wine styles with dry styles produced in larger quantities than the sweeter style. The sweeter styles tend to be more commercially successful, particularly the late harvest dessert wines and passito wine style made by drying the grape to near raisins after they are harvested. These sweet Verduzzos are medium bodied with a deep golden color and honeyed aromas. The drier styles have a lighter body and more astringency due to less balance of the grape's sugars with its tannin levels.

According to wine expert Jancis Robinson, well made varietal examples of sweet Verduzzo from favorable vintages can be "powerful and fresh" with the potential to age in the bottle for a few years after the vintage date. Robinson notes that these wines will often have slight herbal and cedar notes along with the honeyed aromas commonly associated with the style. However, for the drier style, Robinson believes that the slight astringent character of Verduzzo tends to become more noticeable.

Oz Clarke describes the sweeter examples of Verduzzo as "runny honey" with floral notes and an "enlivening backbone of acidity. Clarke agrees with Jancis Robinson that well made examples have the potential to develop with age but believes that the wines tend to be at their best when "young and fresh". Italian wine writer Victor Hazan, husband of the Italian cookbook writer Marcella Hazan, recommends consuming sweet examples of Verduzzo, such as Ramandolo, at between three and four years after the vintage date.

=== Food and wine pairing ===
The wide variance in styles of Verduzzo opens it up to a wide variety of food and wine pairing options. The sweeter styles are often enjoyed as dessert in themselves or paired with blue cheeses, nuts and fruit. The drier styles are often paired with seafood and pasta dishes with light seafood sauce common in Venetian cuisine. Author Victor Hazan also recommends dry Verduzzo Friulano with chicken and game bird dishes, either roasted or grilled and notes that some full-bodied examples of Verduzzo could even hold up to beef casserole dishes.

== Sub-varieties and relationship to other grapes ==
Throughout Italy are several sub-varieties of Verduzzo that seem to be of mostly inferior quality to the Verduzzo Friulano grape but may offer other viticultural or economic benefits such as greater disease resistance and higher yields. One exception is the Verduzzo Rascie which produces looser clusters that are less likely to rot as it hangs longer on the vine, making its slightly better for late harvest wines. Verduzzo Giallo (also known as "yellow Verduzzo" or "Verduzzo Ramandolo") is one of the better sub-varieties and does well with the sweeter wine. Verduzzo Verde is a rare, lower quality sub variety that is mostly found in the plains region of the Friuli.

For many years ampelographers were unsure if the Verduzzo Trevigiano grape, which appeared in the Friuli-Venezia Giulia in the 20th century, was related to Verduzzo Friulano. The two varieties were often planted together with the Trevigiano variety producing higher yields but less aromatic and flavorful wine. DNA profiling conducted in 2010 and 2011 using simple sequence repeats (SSRs) on over 1005 Vitis vinifera varieties concluded definitively that the Trevigiano and Friulano varieties of Verduzzo were two distinct grape varieties. The same research also proved that the Verduzzo planted in the Ramandolo region near Nimis, known locally as Verduzzo Ramandolo was identical to the Verduzzo Friulano planted elsewhere.

== Synonyms ==
Over the years Verduzzo has been known under a variety of synonyms including: Ramandolo, Romandolo, Verdana Friulana, Verdicchio Friulano, Verduc, Verduz, Verduza, Verduzzo Friulano, Verduzzo giallo, Veduzz, Verduzo and Verduzzo verde.
