= Verduzzo Trevigiano =

Variety of grape

Verduzzo Trevigiano is a white Venetian grape variety that is grown in the Eastern Veneto wine area (northeast of Italy). In the past the name Verduz referred to a wide range of grape varieties in the Venetian area. By the descriptions found, they were often morphologically very different, but shared the character of late ripening. However we can very frequently find the name Verduzzo in the ampelographic list of the 19th century, there is not any sign of this Verduzzo until the beginning of the 20th century. At that time just two varieties, with the same name Verduzzo, were still cultivated in the Veneto and Friuli area, they were what we today call Verduzzo Friulano and Verduzzo Trevigiano. The two varieties are clearly different, as demonstrated even with DNA profiling analyses in 2010 and 2011. However at the beginning of the 20th century, the two Verduzzo were called with the same name and often were present in the same vineyard and made wine together. Cosmo proposed to call the two varieties with different names: Verduzzo friulano for the varieties typical of Ramandolo production that was the only one present in that area of Friuli, and Verduzzo Trevigiano for the other one, that was present in the oriental zone of Veneto, where even Verduzzo friulano was spread, but which has a sure origin in the Treviso province how showed by the papers of Lepido Rocco.

== Origins ==
The name Trevigiano means "from the province of Treviso" and the grape is today still widely found in the Treviso and Venezia province of the Veneto but ampelographers are not yet certain if the grape is, indeed, indigenous to the region. Anecdotal evidence speculates that the grape may have originated in Sardinia and was introduced to the region in the early 20th century but so far no DNA evidence has shown a link with any modern Sardinian grape varieties.

== Viticulture ==
Verduzzo Trevigiano is known to be a vigorous vine that can adapt to many different kinds of climate and vineyard soils. It tends to be a late ripening grape which can lend itself well to the production of late harvest wines.

== Wine regions ==
According to a 2000 census there were 1,734 hectares (4,285 acres) of Verduzzo Trevigiano growing in Italy, most of it within the Veneto provinces of Treviso and Venezia. Here the grape is a permitted variety in the Denominazione di origine controllata wines of the Lison-Pramaggiore DOC and Piave DOC, often blended with Verduzzo Friulano in wines that are varietally labelled as just Verduzzo. It is also used in some vino da tavolas in the region where some Venetian wine producers are experimenting with blending the grape with Chardonnay as well as barrel-fermentation and oak aging.

== Synonyms ==
Over the years Verduzzo Trevigiano has been known under a variety of synonyms, many of which overlap with Verduzzo Friulano, including: Verduz, Verduza, Verduzo, Verduzz, Verduzzo, Verduzzo di Motta and Verduzzo Verde.
