= Georg Geyer =

Austrian paleontologist (1857–1936)

Georg Geyer (20 February 1857 in Schloss Auhof, near Blindenmarkt – 25 November 1936 in Vienna) was an Austrian geologist and paleontologist.

Geyer studied at Graz University of Technology, at the Bergakademie in Leoben and at the University of Vienna. From 1882 he was associated with the Geological Survey of Austria, being named chief geologist in 1900 and serving as its director from 1920 to 1923. In 1921 he became a member of the Vienna Academy of Sciences.

== Selected works ==
- Das Todte Gebirge, 1878 – The Totes Gebirge.
- Über die liasischen Cephalopoden des Hierlatz bei Hallstatt, 1886 – On Liassic cephalopods of Hierlatz in Hallstatt.
- Über die liasischen Brachiopoden des Hierlatz bei Hallstatt, 1889 – On Liassic brachiopods of Hierlatz in Hallstatt.
- Die mittelliasische Cephalopoden-Fauna des Hinter-Schafberges in Oberösterreich, 1893 – The Middle Liassic cephalopod fauna of the Hinter-Schafberges in Upper Austria.
- Die karnische Hauptkette der Südalpen, 1911 – The Carnic backbone of the Southern Alps.
