= Lake Wolayer =

Mountain lake

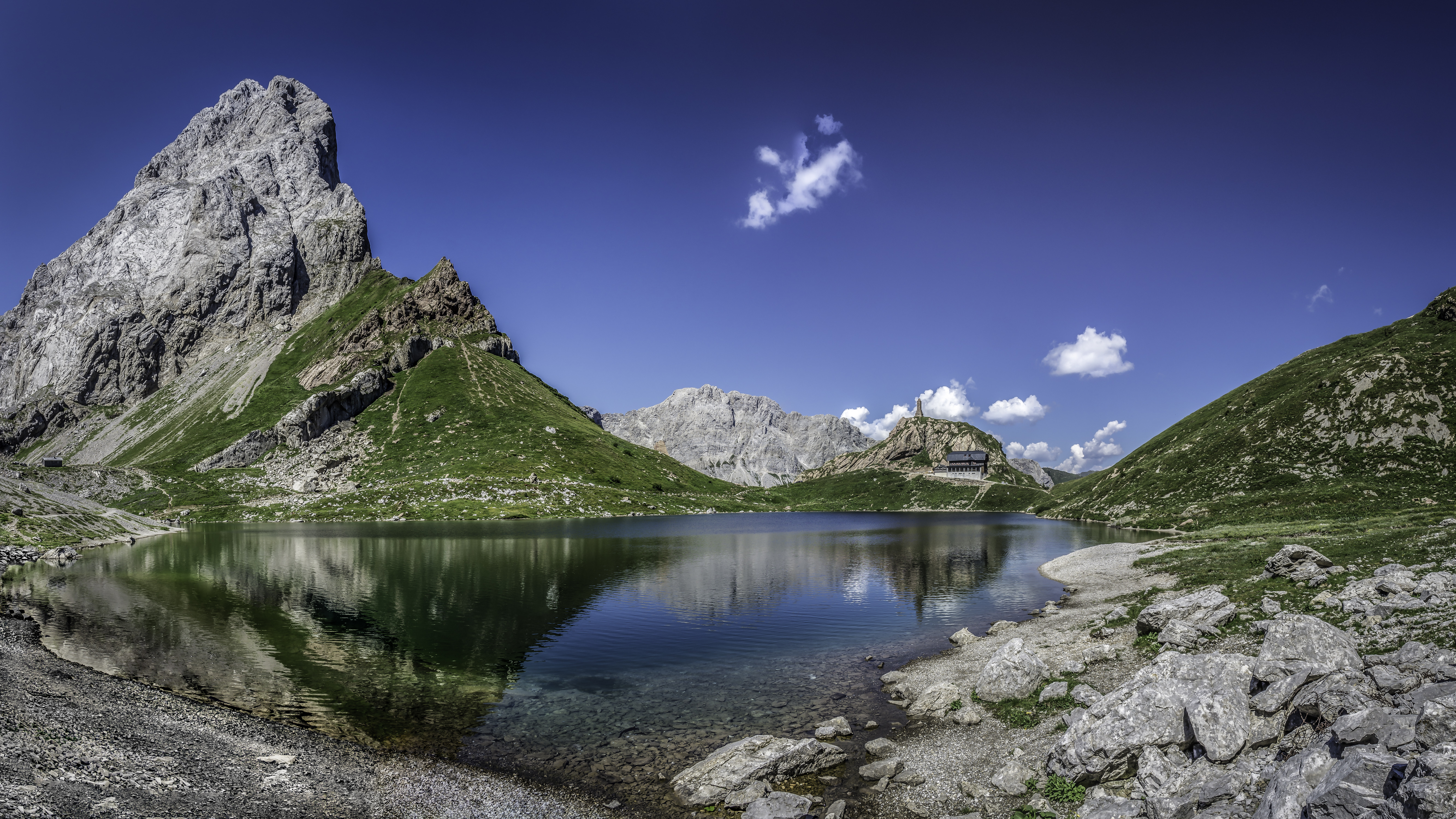
- The lake with the Wolayerseehütte and Seekopf
- Interactive map of Lake Wolayer
- Location: Carnic Alps near Plöcken Pass
- Coordinates: 46.611°N 12.869°E
- Type: Lake
- Max. depth: 13.9 metres (46 ft)
- Surface elevation: 1,951 metres (6,401 ft)

The Lake Wolayer is an Austrian mountain lake on the Carinthian side of the Carnic Main Ridge, near the Plöcken Pass. It is the centrepiece of the Wolayer See and surrounding area nature reserve. Notable plant species include Alpine eryngo (Eryngium alpestre), sweet cicely (Myrrhis odorata), and Austrian ribwort (Pleurospermum austriacum).

The lake lies at an altitude of 1,951 m (6,401 ft) above sea level and covers an area of 4 hectares. It is located in a doline formed tectonically and reshaped by the Wolayer Glacier during the Ice Age. The catchment area spans approximately 60 ha (150 acres). Annual rainfall in the region ranges between 2,000 and 2,500 mm (79 and 98 in), maintaining a relatively constant water level despite the absence of surface inflow. The lakebed is covered with mud, which seals the lake. The western part of the lake slopes gently, while the eastern side is steeper. The deepest point is 13.9 m (46 ft) below the surface, but two-thirds of the lake is less than 5 m (16 ft) deep. Water that flows underground from the lake feeds two springs: one in Austrian territory and another in Italian territory, south of the Lambertenghi hut.

== Physical and chemical parameters ==
The surface water temperature reaches a maximum of 14 °C. Stable temperature stratification does not develop in summer due to the lake's wind-exposed location, situated only 26 m (85 ft) below the Wolayer Pass, where strong winds blow. The lake is frozen for six to seven months each year, with a multi-layered ice cover reaching up to 2 m (6 ft 7 in) thick.

The lake water is slightly alkaline, with a relatively low electrical conductivity of less than 100 μS/cm. The acid-binding capacity is low, at less than 1.3 mval/L, and the lime hardness ranges from 3 to 4 °dH. Nutrient concentrations (phosphorus, nitrate) are low. Organic matter is primarily introduced through the air (e.g., pollen, plant parts).

== Biology ==
Due to the low nutrient concentration, the amount of suspended algae is minimal, measuring less than 250 mg/m^{3} (0.11 gr/cu ft).

Like most high mountain lakes, Wolayer See is naturally fish-free. However, in 1976, fifteen brown trout were introduced, significantly reducing the population of lake fleas (Gammarus lacustris). The trout initially thrived but became stunted after a few years due to starvation. In 1980, 4,000 char (Salvelinus umbla) and brook trout (Salvelinus fontinalis) were introduced. These fish also reproduced successfully at first but later became stunted due to starvation, a condition known as "black reiters".

There is largely no siltation zone or aquatic vegetation. Marsh plants occur in a few shallow areas, including narrow-leaved cottongrass (Eriophorum angustifolium), marsh marigold (Caltha palustris), spring saxifrage (Saxifraga aizoides), marsh willowherb (Epilobium alsinifolium), and rush species such as Juncus filiformis and Juncus triglumis.

== Nature reserve ==
Wolayer See is the centrepiece of the Wolayersee Nature Reserve and Surrounding Area, established in 1959 (LGBl. No. 34/1959, 19/1960, republished in LGBl. No. 1/2003). The protected area spans 1,939.4 ha (4,792 acres) along the Carnic Main Ridge, west of the Plöcken Pass. Geologically, the area consists of Silurian and Devonian limestone overlaid by Upper Carboniferous shale. The vegetation is characterized by blue grass, cushion sedge, scree and rock crevice communities, golden fescue, brush sedge, and curled sedge. Notable plant species include Alpine eryngo (Eryngium alpestre), sweet cicely (Myrrhis odorata), and Austrian ribwort (Pleurospermum austriacum).

== Bibliography ==
- Hartl, H.; Sampl, H.; Unkart, R. (1993). Kleinode Kärntens: Nationalparks, Naturschutzgebiete, Landschaftsschutzgebiete, Naturdenkmale [Carinthia's gems: national parks, nature reserves, landscape conservation areas, natural monuments] (in German). Klagenfurt, Austria: Kärntner Druck- und Verlagsgesellschaft. p. 34. ISBN 3-85391-092-0.
- Honsig-Erlenburg, W.; Petutschnig, W. (2002). "Die Gewässer des Gailtales". In Honsig-Erlenburg, W.; Petutschnig, W. (eds.). Der Wolayer See und andere Hochgebirgsseen [Lake Wolayer and other high mountain lakes] (in German). Klagenfurt, Austria: Naturwissenschaftlicher Verein für Kärnten. pp. 107–118. ISBN 3-85328-021-8.
