= Cresta di Enghe =

Mountain in Italy

Coordinates: 46°31′14″N 12°38′05″E

Highest point
- Elevation: 2,414 m (7,920 ft)

Geography
- Location: Friuli-Venezia Giulia, Italy

Cresta di Enghe is a mountain, 2,414 metres (7,920 ft) above sea level, located in the Dolomiti Pesarine group of the Carnic Alps in northeastern Italy.

The mountain lies between Terza Grande and Monte Clap, near Passo di Oberenghe, on the boundary between the municipalities of Sappada and Santo Stefano di Cadore. It is part of a mountain area popular for hiking and alpine excursions.
