= Monte Ferro =

Mountain in Italy

- Location within Italy

Highest point
- Elevation: 2,348 m (7,703 ft)
- Coordinates: 46°35′02″N 12°40′09″E

Geography
- Location: Veneto, Italy

Monte Ferro is a mountain in the Carnic Alps, Veneto of north-western Italy. It has an elevation of 2,337 metres (7,667 ft) above sea level.

It lies on the boundary between the regions of Friuli‑Venezia Giulia and Veneto, dominating the municipality of Sappada in the province of Udine from its southern slopes.
