= Eiskar =

Glacier in the Carnic Alps in Carinthia

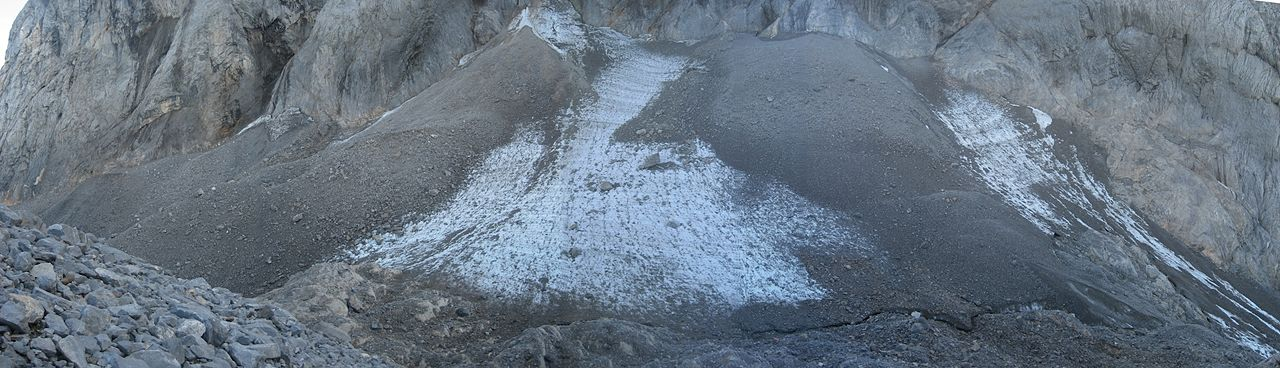
- Interactive map of Eiskar
- Type: Cirque glacier
- Location: Carinthia, Austria
- Coordinates: 46°36′38″N 12°54′23″E
- Area: 0.151 sq km
- Length: 0.4 km
- Highest elevation: 2390 m
- Lowest elevation: 2160 m
- Status: Only remaining glacier of the Carnic Alps

The Eiskar is the only existing glacier in the Carnic Alps, a mountain range in Austria and Italy. It is a typical cirque glacier that, thanks to its shady location and to avalanche breaks in its catchment area, has been able to survive at the relatively low height of 2160–2390 metres above sea level. Although the ice sheet in good times could calve over a rock wall down to the pasture of Valentinalm below, currently it is rapidly becoming a sheet of dead ice. In the period 2007–2014, however, no significant retreat was observed. The glacier may be accessed from below up a klettersteig, and from above quite easily via the Kellerwand rock face. Remains of defensive positions witness to the mountain war of 1915-1918.
