= Peralba =

Mountain in Italy

- Hochweißstein
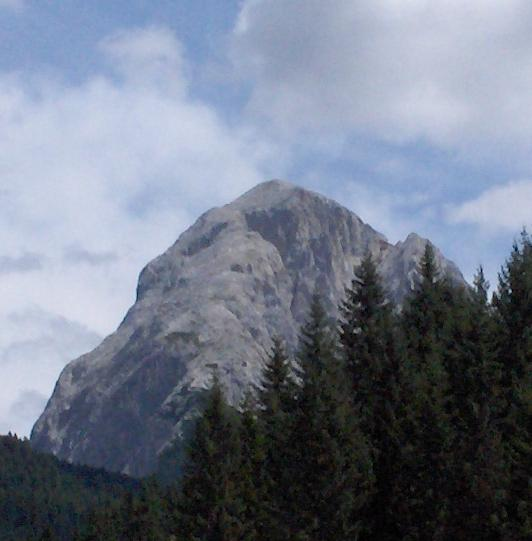
- Peralba

Highest point
- Elevation: 2,694 m (8,839 ft)
- Prominence: 725 m (2,379 ft)
- Coordinates: 46°38′N 12°43′E

Geography
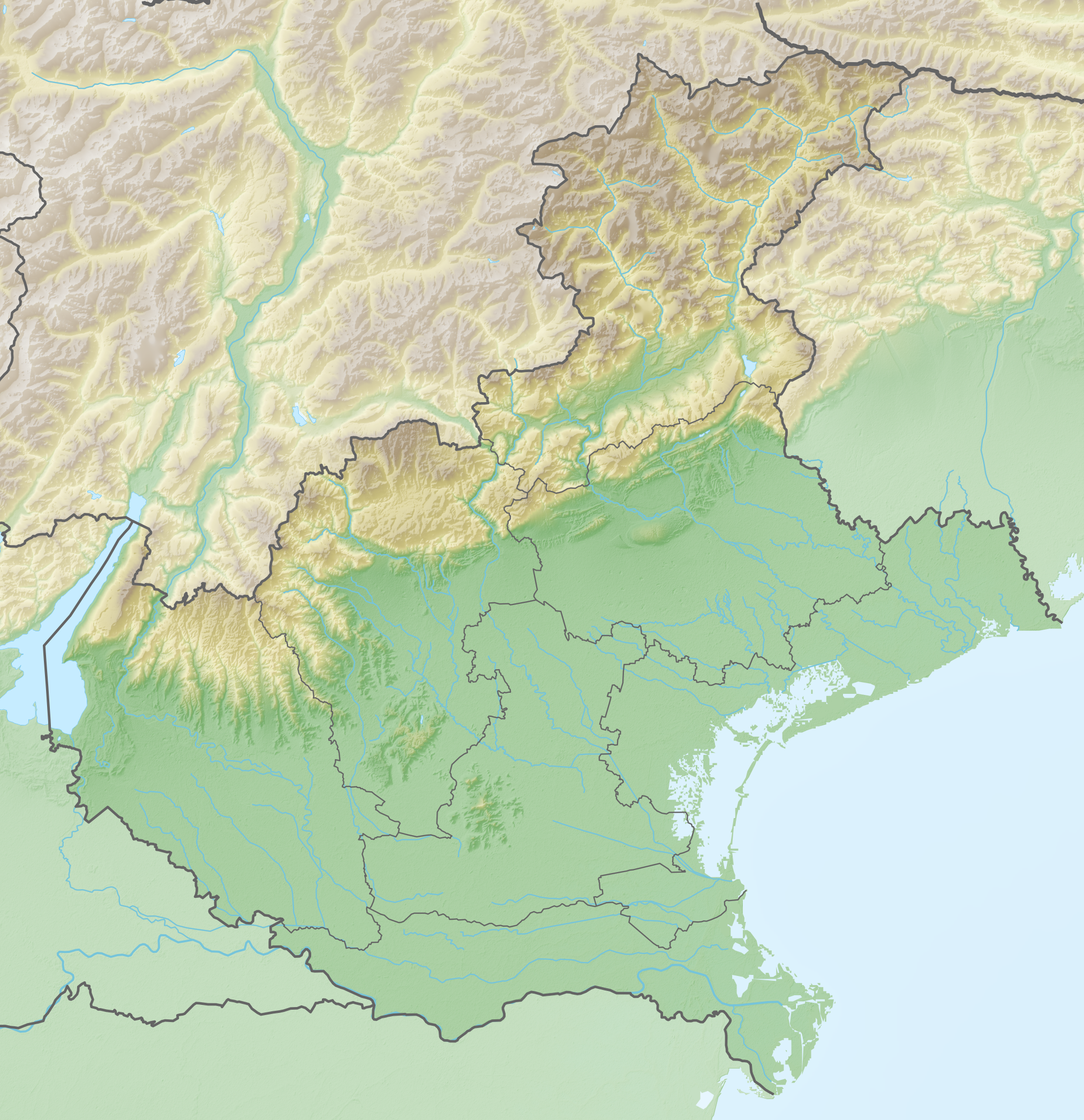
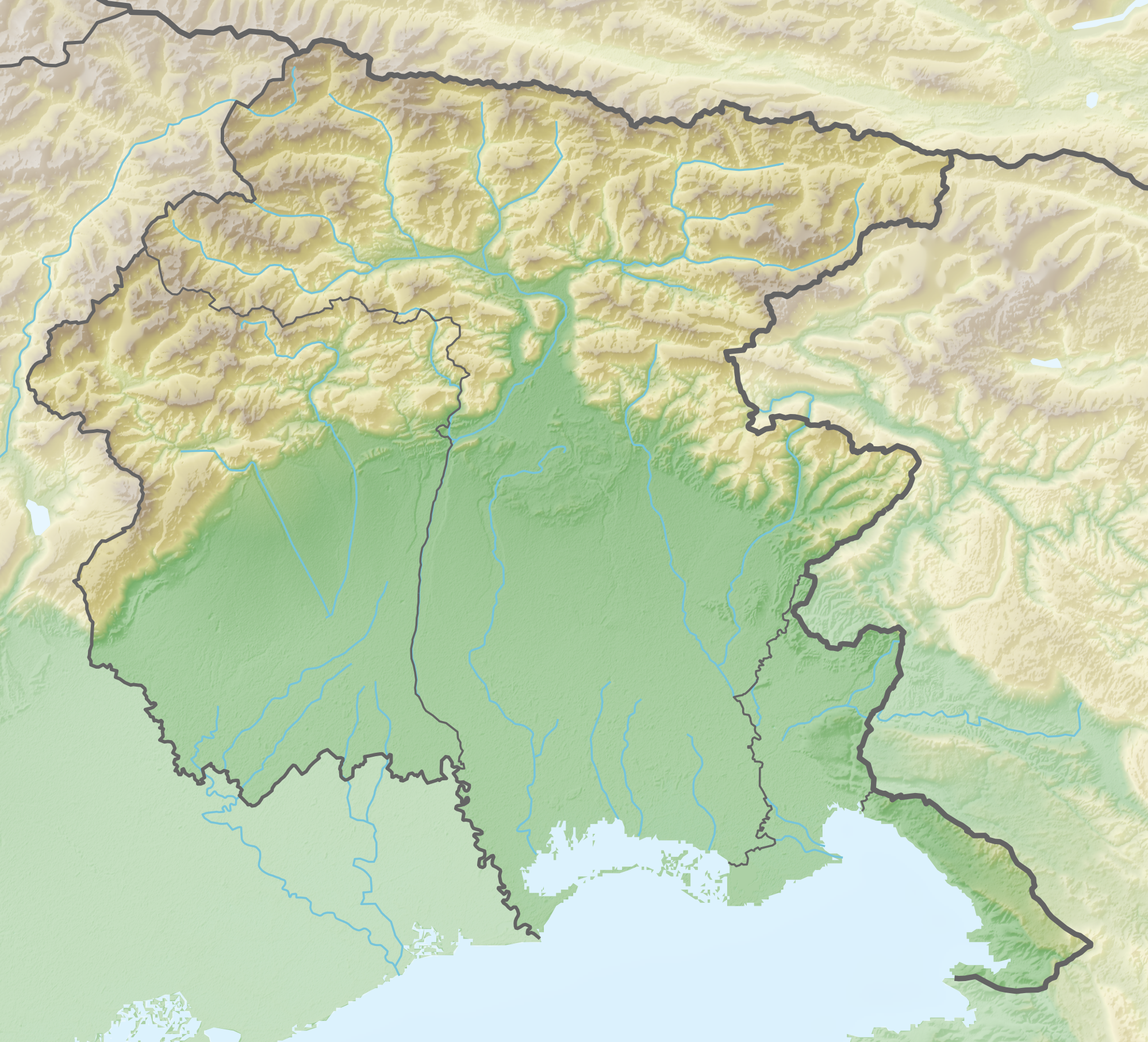
- Location within Alps Location within Veneto Location within Friuli-Venezia Giulia Location within Austria
- Location: Veneto, Italy
- Parent range: Carnic Alps

Peralba (Hochweißstein in German) is a mountain of the Carnic Alps in Veneto, northeastern Italy, although its summit is only a few hundred metres from the Austrian border. It has a height of 2,694 m making it the second highest mountain of the Carnics, after Coglians (in Italy). It lies on the main chain of the range, between the Austrian Lesachtal Valley in the north and the Italian Piave Valley in the south. The mountain resembles a huge cubic block of the stone, with a large summit plateau, and dominates the view from miles around.

== World War I ==
The mountain was the sight of fierce fighting as part of the Italian Front. It was a strategically important peak due to its height and prominence over the surrounding area, and its summit plateau where fortifications could be built. Even today there are remnants from the Great War on the peak, such as caves and a fort.
