= Monte Terza Grande =

Mountain in Italy

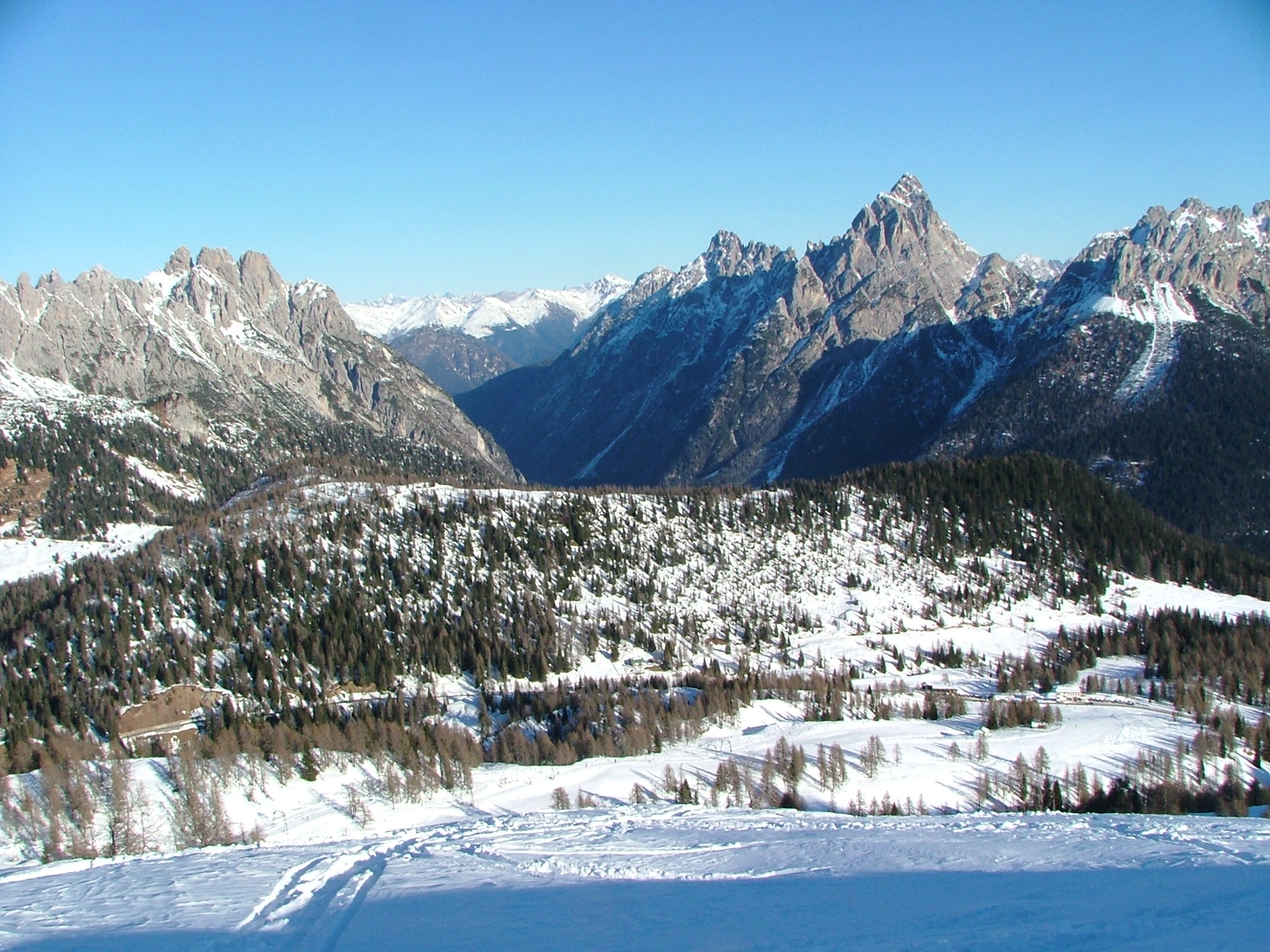
- Monte Terza Grande (right)

Highest point
- Elevation: 2,586 m (8,484 ft)
- Prominence: 1,277 m (4,190 ft)
- Isolation: 13.53 km (8.41 mi)
- Coordinates: 46°32′N 12°37′E

Geography
- Location within Alps
- Location: Veneto, Italy
- Parent range: Carnic Alps

Climbing
- First ascent: 1820

Monte Terza Grande (2,586 m) is a mountain of the Carnic Alps in Belluno, Veneto in north-eastern Italy. It is the highest mountain of the Southern Carnics and is part of a small Dolomitic group known as the "Dolomiti Pesarine". It resembles a pyramid from the north and south and a rocky massif from the east or west, and boasts a northwest face that is one kilometre high. It was first climbed in 1820.
