= Monte Sernio =

Mountain in Italy

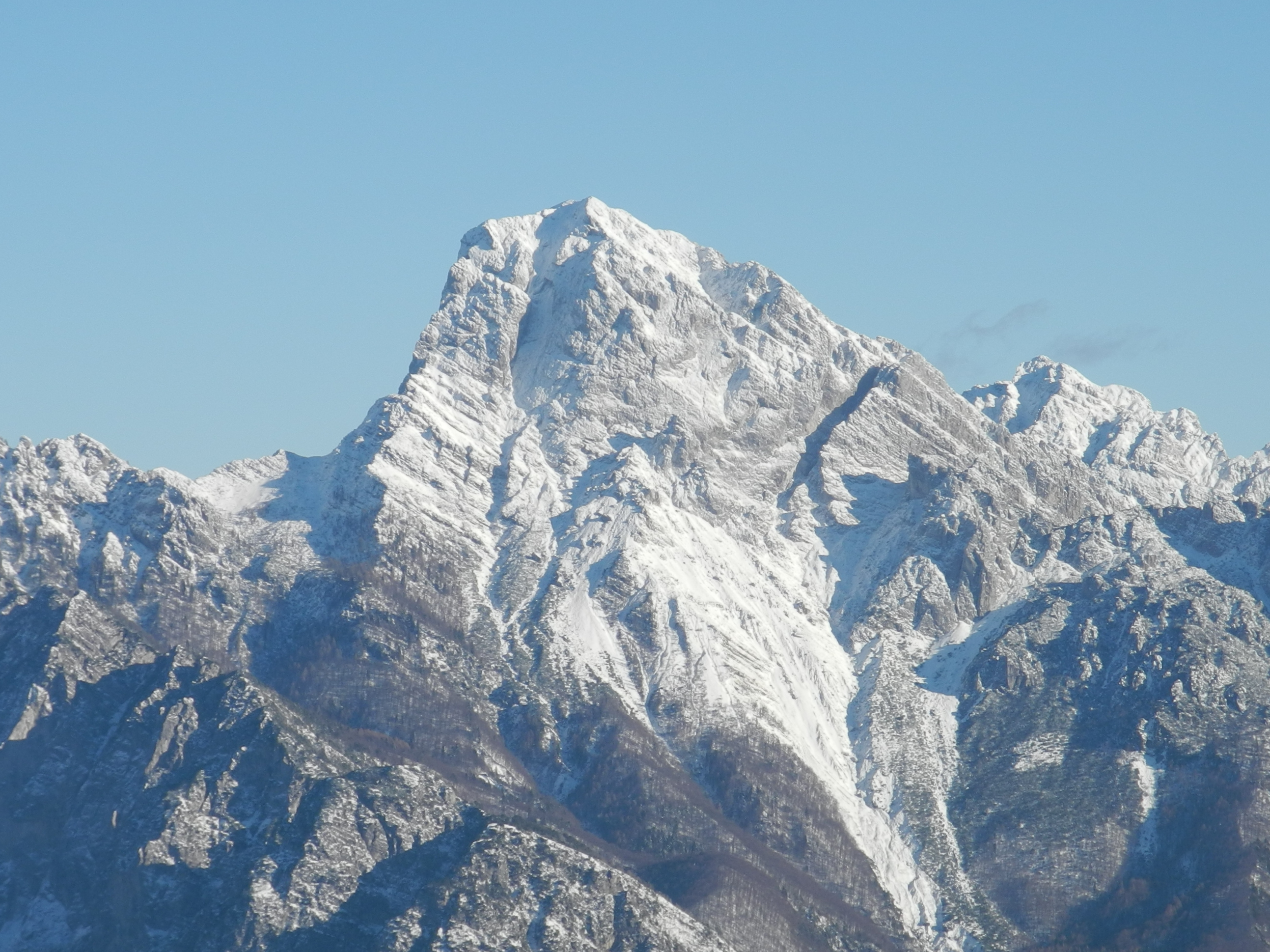
- Monte Sernio

Highest point
- Elevation: 2,187 m (7,175 ft)
- Prominence: 941 m (3,087 ft)
- Coordinates: 46°28′N 13°07′E

Geography
- Location within Alps
- Location: Udine, Italy
- Parent range: Carnic Alps

Climbing
- First ascent: 1879

Monte Sernio is a remote mountain of the Carnic Alps, in Udine, northeast Italy, with an elevation of 2,187 m. It is located, together with the nearby Creta Grauzaria, in the mountain chain between the Incarojo Valley, near the village of Paularo, and the Aupa Valley. It was first climbed in 1879 by sisters Minetta and Annina Grassi.
