= Mölltaler Polinik =

Mountain in Austria

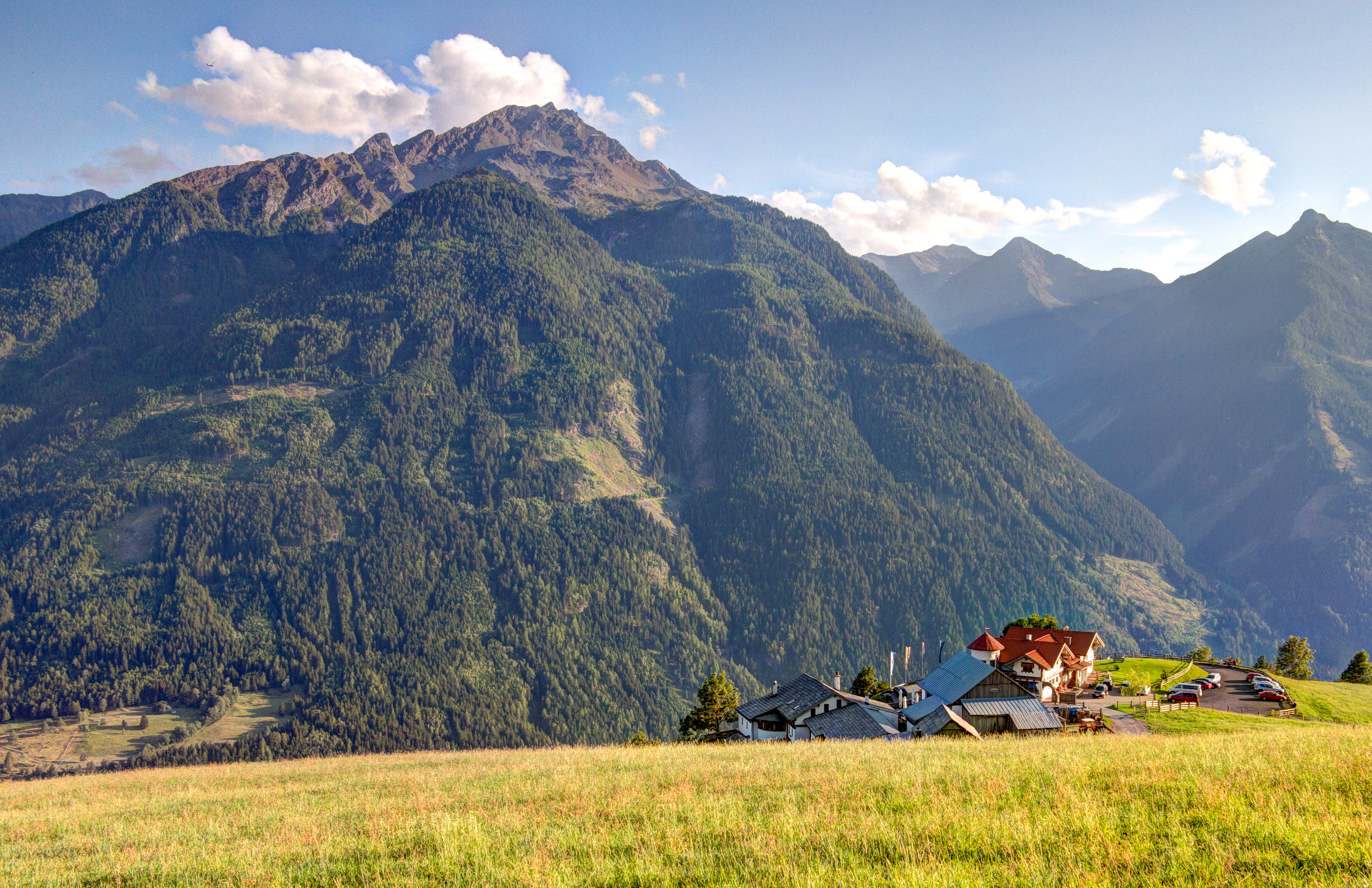
- View from north

Highest point
- Elevation: 2,784 m (AA) (9,134 ft)
- Prominence: 1,579 m ↓ Iselsberg Pass
- Isolation: 10.4 km → Böseck
- Listing: Ultra
- Coordinates: 46°53′46″N 13°09′24″E

Geography
- Location within Austria
- Location: Carinthia, Austria
- Parent range: High Tauern; Kreuzeck group

The Mölltaler Polinik, at 2,784 m (9,134 ft), is the highest mountain of the Kreuzeck group, a southern part of the High Tauern range in the Austrian state of Carinthia.

== Geography ==
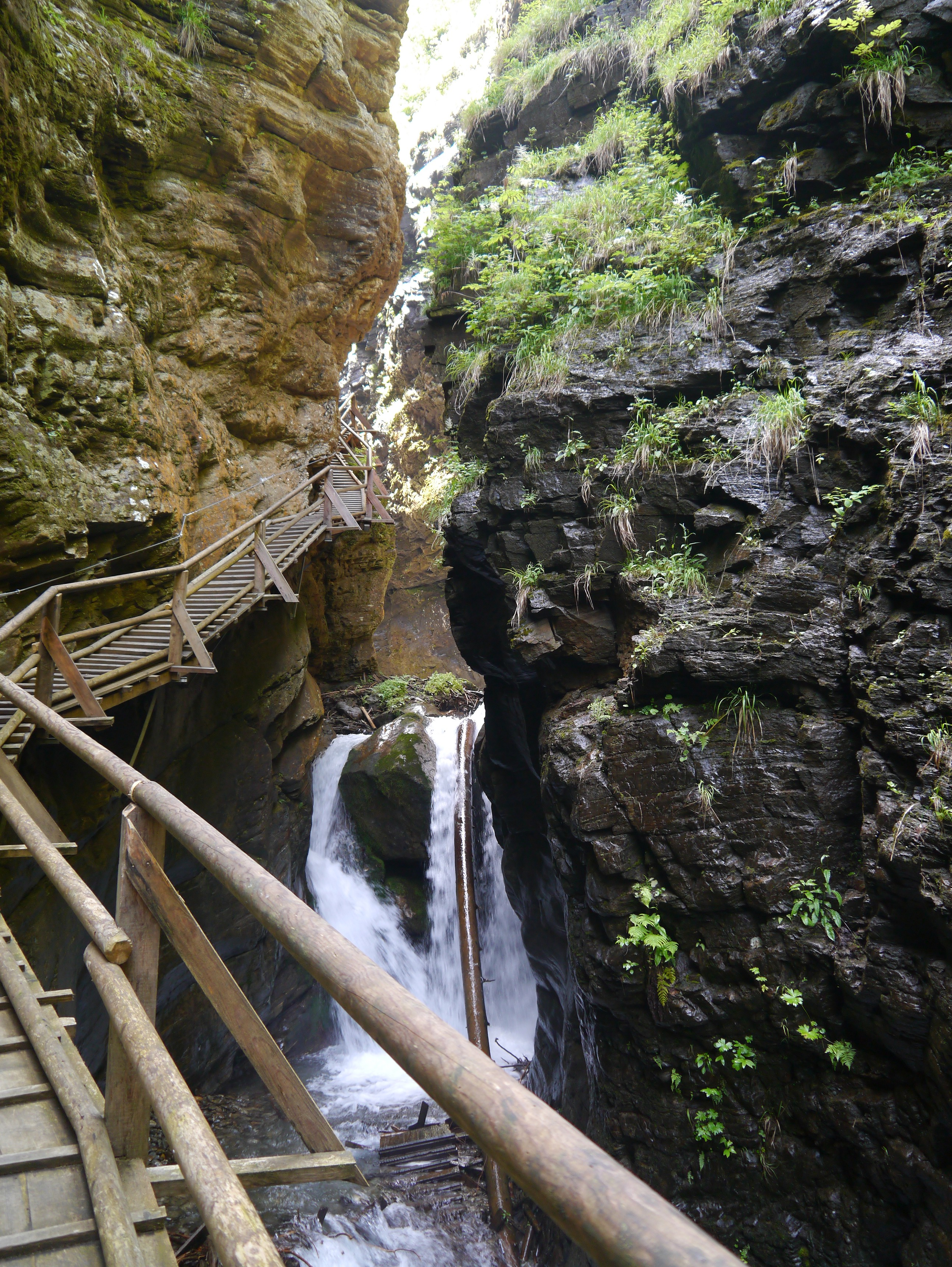
Ragga Ravine

The peak rises south of the villages of Flattach and Obervellach in the Möll Valley. From Obervellach a footpath leads past the Polinikhaus lodge (1,873 m (6,145 ft), run by Mölltal Section of the Austrian Alpine Club) to the summit.

From Flattach the mountain may be climbed through the 200 m (660 ft) deep Ragga Ravine (Raggaschlucht), a protected natural monument, where a winding boardwalk leads across numerous waterfalls up to the Raggaalm pasture.

== See also ==
- Gailtaler Polinik

== Literature ==
- Manfred Posch: Reißeck, Kreuzeck. Die schönsten Touren, Klagenfurt, 2000, Kärntner Druck- und Verlagsgesellschaft m.b.H., ISBN 3-85391-176-5
