= Gailtaler Polinik =

Mountain in the Carnic Alps in Carinthia

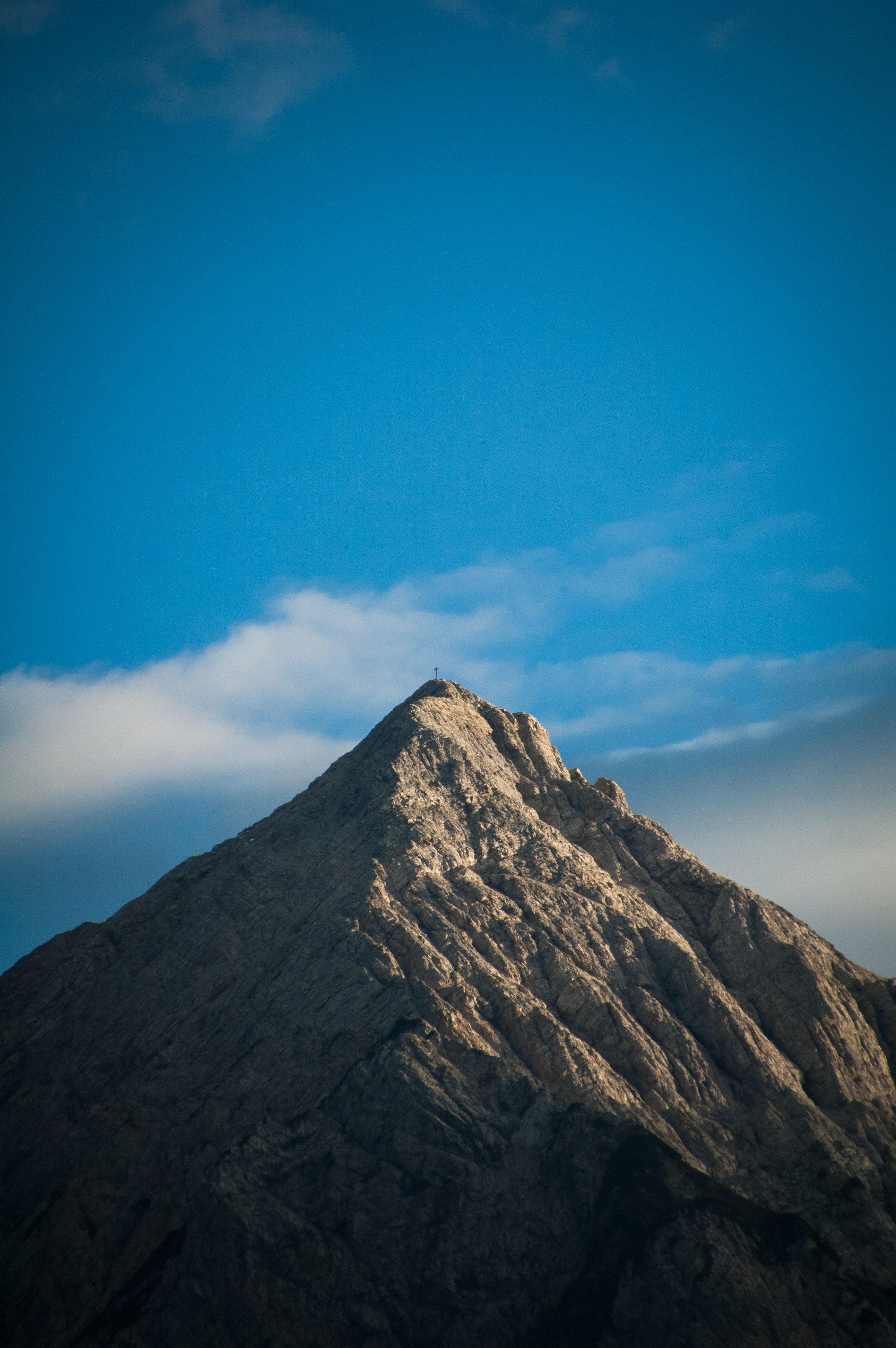
- Gailtaler Polinik

Highest point
- Elevation: 2,332 m (AA) (7,651 ft)
- Prominence: 975
- Coordinates: 46°37′39″N 12°58′55″E

Geography
- Location within Alps
- Location: Carinthia, Austria
- Parent range: Carnic Alps

The Gailtaler Polinik (also known as the Angerkofel) is a mountain, 2,332 m above sea level (AA), in the Carnic Alps in the Austrian state of Carinthia. It lies on the main ridge of the Carnics and is the highest peak of the Eastern group.

It lies south of the market municipality of Kötschach-Mauthen and northeast of the Plöcken Pass. The easiest and shortest climb runs from the Plöckenhaus via the Spielbodenalm and Spielbodentörl to the summit of the Polinik. Its free-standing situation offers a very impressive panoramic view of the upper Gail valley and the Gailtal Alps.

== See also ==
- Mölltaler Polinik
