= Plöcken Pass =

Mountain pass in the Carnic Alps at the border Austria / Italy

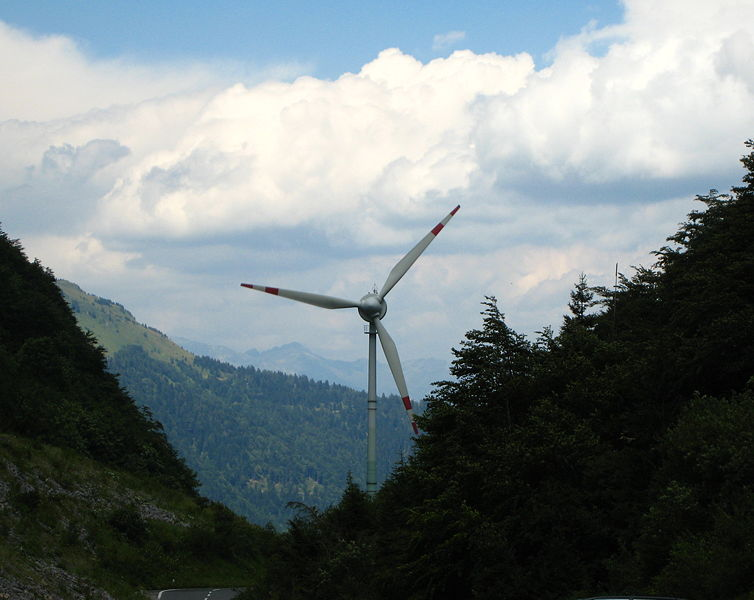
- Wind turbine on the Austrian side of the Plöcken Pass

- Location within Alps
- Elevation: 1,357 metres (4,452 ft)
- Traversed by: Bundesstraße 110 Plöckenpass Straße - Strada Statale 52bis Carnica

Third Approach
- Location: Austria–Italy border
- Range: Carnic Alps
- Coordinates: 46°36′11.6″N 12°56′41.8″E

Plöcken Pass (German: Plöckenpass, Italian: Passo di Monte Croce Carnico) is a high mountain pass in the Carnic Alps mountain range at the border between the Austrian state of Carinthia and the Friuli-Venezia Giulia region of Italy. It links the market town of Kötschach-Mauthen in the Carinthian Gail Valley with the Paluzza municipality in the Carnia region of Friuli.

A few miles to the west along the ridge is Mt. Coglians, with 2,780 m (9,121 ft) the highest peak of the Carnic and Gailtal Alps. Before reaching the upper Gail Valley, the pass road also crosses the lower Gailbergsattel at 981 m (3,219 ft) in the north.

== History ==
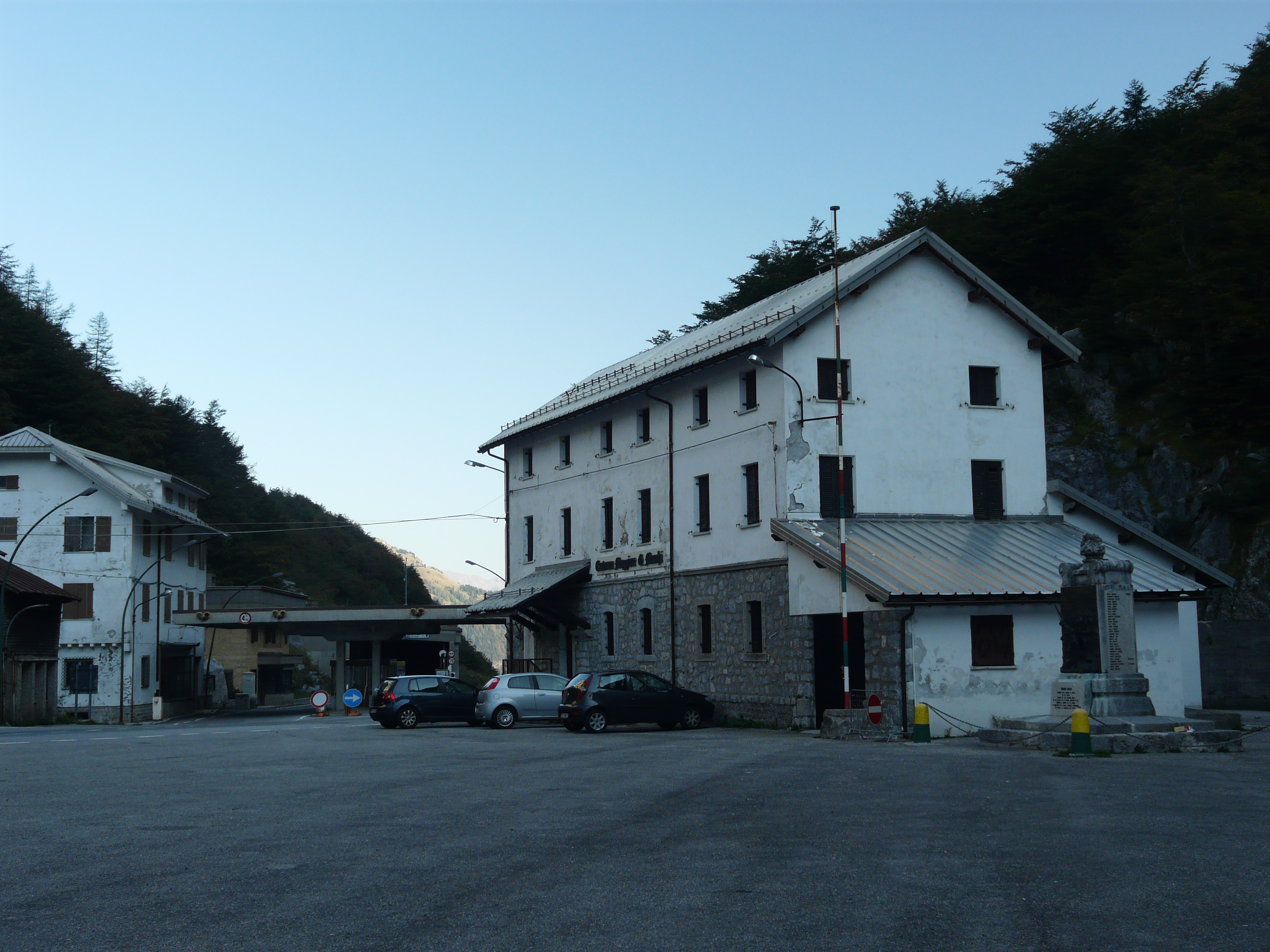
Former border control facilities

The Italian name derives from Latin Monte Crucis ("mountain of the cross"), a denotation of the pass in mediæval times. The valley of the Gail River had been a settlement area since the Neolithic era, and a bridle path probably existed already in the Bronze Age. Roman forces under General Tiberius rebuilt the path as a road after the incorporation of the Noricum province in 15 BC, in order to reach the newly conquered lands north of the Carnic Alps from Italy.

The well constructed road was in use throughout the Middle Ages as part of the trade route between Aquileia and Salzburg, also after the Carnia region in the south was conquered by the Republic of Venice in 1420. The former mansio at Timau (Tischelwang, today part of Paluzza) south of the pass was resettled by miners from Carinthia, up to today it is a German-speaking enclave on Italian territory.

Upon the 1809 Treaty of Schönbrunn, Napoleonic troops crossed the Plöcken Pass to occupy the Upper Carinthian lands around Villach, which had been ceded to the French Empire as part of the Illyrian Provinces. In World War I the pass became a theater of the Italian Campaign of 1915–1918, when Italian Alpini troops tried to push northwards into Carinthia, though to no avail. As both sides soon concentrated on attrition warfare, numerous bunkers and tunnels were constructed, the remnants of which are still visible today.

== See also ==
- List of highest paved roads in Europe
- List of mountain passes
- Lake Wolayer
