= Carnic Alps =

Mountain range in Austria and Italy

- Alps Cjargnelis (Friulian); Karnische Alpen (German); Alpi Carniche (Italian); Karnijske Alpe (Slovene)
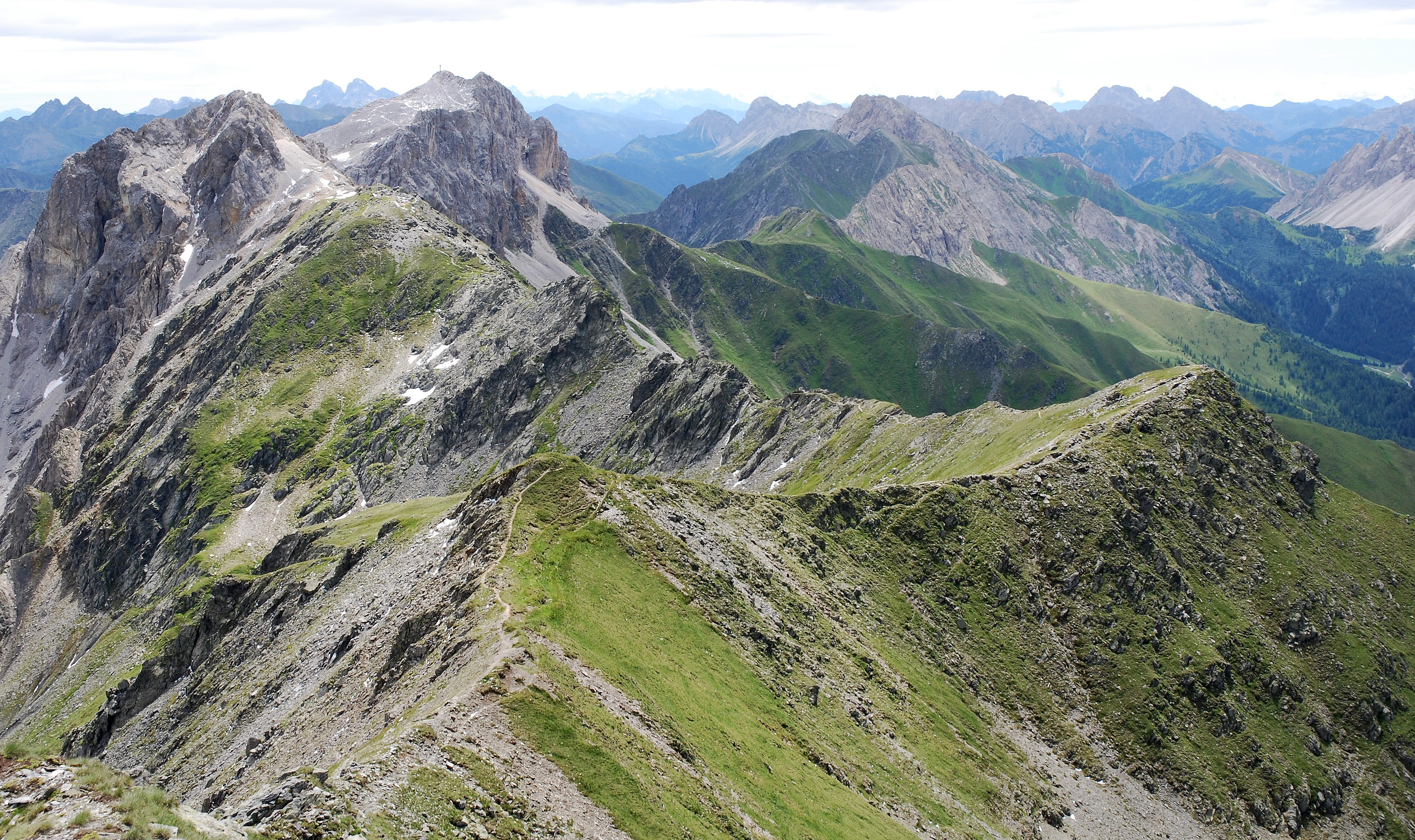
- View from Pfannspitze along the main ridge to the east.

Highest point
- Peak: Coglians
- Elevation: 2,782 m (9,127 ft)
- Coordinates: 46°36′N 12°53′E

Geography
- Countries: Austria; Italy
- Länder, Regioni: Tyrol; Carinthia; Friuli-Venezia Giulia; Veneto
- Range coordinates: 46°30′N 13°00′E
- Parent range: Southern Limestone Alps

Geology
- Orogeny: Alpine orogeny

The Carnic Alps (Italian: Alpi Carniche; German: Karnische Alpen; Slovene: Karnijske Alpe; Friulian: Alps Cjargnelis) are a range of the Southern Limestone Alps in Austria and northeastern Italy. They are within Austrian East Tyrol and Carinthia, and Italian Friuli (Province of Udine) and marginally in Veneto.

== Etymology ==
They are named after the Roman province of Carnia, which probably has a Celtic origin.

The mountains gave their name to the stage on the geologic time scale known as Carnian, an age in the Triassic Period.

== Geography ==
They extend from east to west for about 100 km (62 mi) between the Gail River, a tributary of the Drava and the Tagliamento, forming the border between Austria and Italy.

=== Alpine Club classification ===
The Carnic Alps are divided into two distinct areas:
- Carnic Main Crest (Karnischer Hauptkamm) (AVE 57a)
- Carnic Prealps (Karnische Voralpen), i.e. the Friaul Dolomites and their foothills, the former are, from the Mauria Pass southwards, counted as part of the group known as the Southern Carnic Alps (Südliche Karnische Alpen) (AVE 57b), which also includes the Bellunese Prealps (Venetian Prealps).

In the Carnic Alps is the southernmost glacier in Austria, the Eiskar, nestling in the Kellerwand massif.

== Notable peaks ==
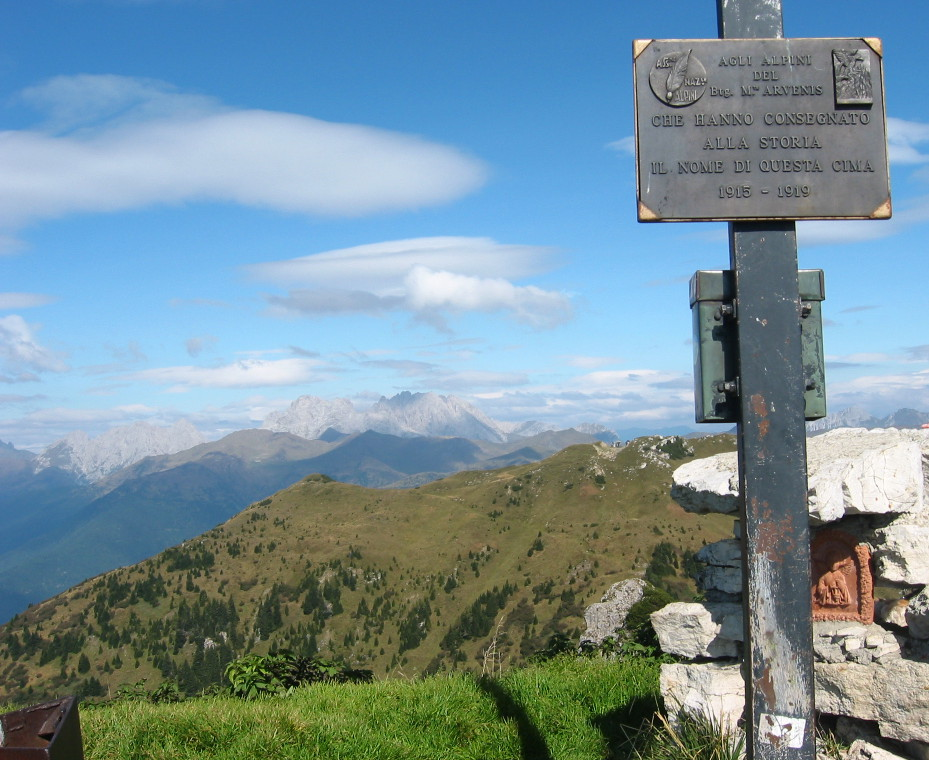
Hohe Warte and Kellerspitzen, view from south (Monte Arvenis)

Among the most important mountains of the range are:

- Coglians / Hohe Warte (2,782 m)
- Kellerspitzen (2,774 m)
- Monte Peralba / Hochweißstein (2,694 m)
- Monte Cavallino / Große Kinigat (2,689 m)
- Rosskopf (2,603 m)
- Monte Terza Grande (2,586 m)
- Monte Bìvera (2,474 m)
- Creta Forata (2,462 m)
- Helm (2,434 m)
- Cresta di Enghe (2,414 m)
- Monte Ferro (2,348 m)
- Gailtaler Polinik (2,332 m)
- Trogkofel (2,280 m)
- Monte Sernio (2,187 m)

== Mountain passes ==
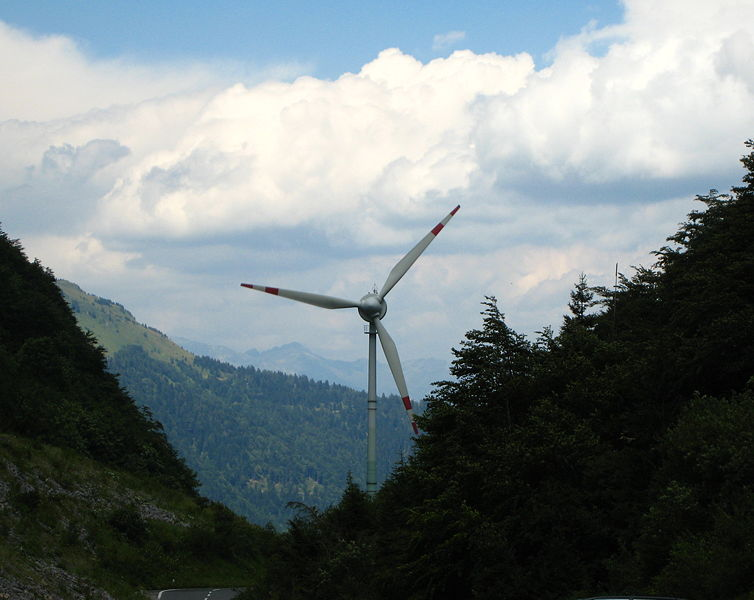
Wind turbine on the Austrian side of the Plöcken Pass

The chief passes of the Carnic Alps are:

- Plöcken Pass (Tolmezzo to Kötschach-Mauthen), road (1,360 m)
- Naßfeld Pass (Pontebba to Hermagor-Pressegger See), road (1,552 m)
- Öfnerjoch (Forni Avoltri to Sankt Lorenzen im Lesachtal), footpath (2,301 m)
- Wolayer Pass (same to Kötschach-Mauthen), footpath (1,922 m)

== See also ==
- Carnic Prealps
- Limestone Alps
