= Piave (river) =

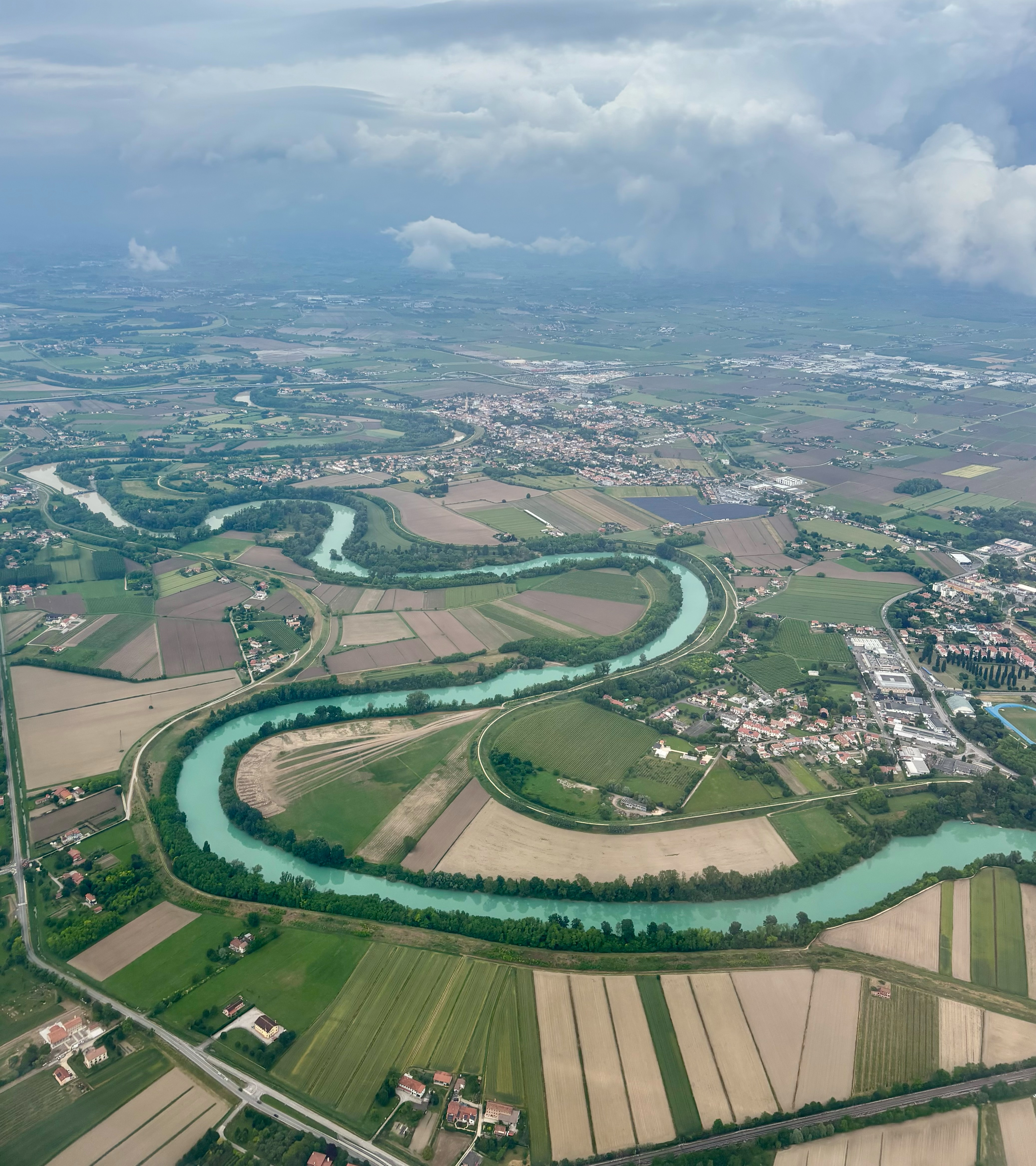
- The Piave River

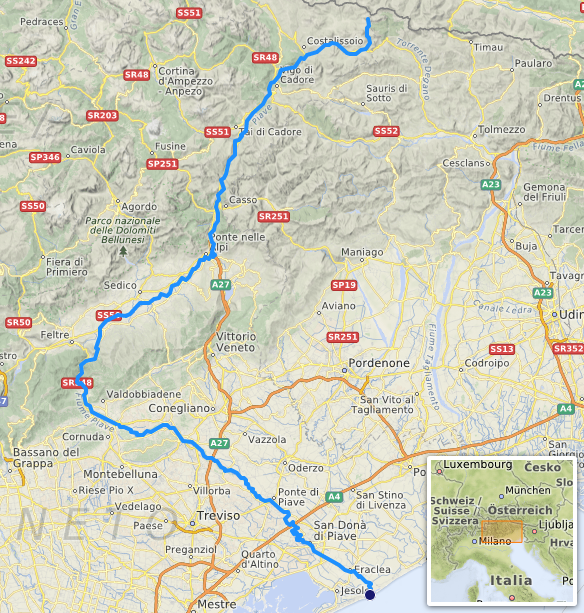

Location
- Country: Italy

Physical characteristics
- Source
  - location: Monte Peralba, Valle di Sappada (Province of Udine)
  - elevation: 2,037 m (6,683 ft)
- Mouth: Adriatic Sea
  - location: near Cortellazzo (frazione of Jesolo)
  - coordinates: 45.5293°N 12.7282°E
- Length: 220 km (140 mi)
- Basin size: 4,126.84 km^{2} (1,593.38 mi^{2})

The Piave (Italian: [ˈpjaːve]; Latin: Plavis) is a river in Northeast Italy. It begins in the Alps and flows southeast for 220 kilometres (140 mi) into the Adriatic Sea near the city of Venice. One of its tributaries is the Boite.

In 1809 it was the scene of a battle during the Napoleonic Wars, in which Franco-Italian and Austrian forces clashed.

In 1918, during World War I, it was the scene of Battle of the Piave River, the last major Austro-Hungarian attack on the Italian front, which failed. The Battle of the Piave River was a decisive battle of World War I on the Italian Front. In Italy the river is thus called Fiume Sacro alla Patria (Sacred River of the Homeland) and is mentioned in the patriotic song "La leggenda del Piave". It was eventually followed by the Battle of Vittorio Veneto later that year.

== Viticulture ==
North of the city of Venice along the Piave Valley is the Denominazione di origine controllata (DOC) zone that makes up the Veneto wine region known as the Piave DOC. Here both red and white wine are produced, mostly as varietal wines, with Merlot being the dominant grape of the region. Among the other grapes grown in the region are Cabernet Sauvignon, Cabernet franc (which can be made separately or together as a wine labelled Cabernet), Pinot blanc, Pinot grigio, Pinot nero, Raboso, Friulano, Verduzzo Trevigiano and Verduzzo Friulano (which can be made separately or together as a wine labelled Verduzzo).

For wines to qualify for DOC labelling the stated variety, they must make up at least 95% of the blend from grapes that are harvested within a maximum yield restriction—11 tonnes/hectare for the Cabernets, Verduzzos and Friulano varieties, 12 tonnes/ha for the Pinots, 13 tonnes/ha for Merlot and 14 tonnes/ha for Raboso. The finished wines also must meet a minimum alcohol level—11.5% for all varieties except Merlot and Friulano which only need to reach 11% alcohol by volume. A separate riserva bottling for the red wine varieties is permitted provided the wine is aged at least two years prior to release and attain a minimum alcohol level of at least 12.5%.

== See also ==
Piave cheese
