= Vajont (river) =

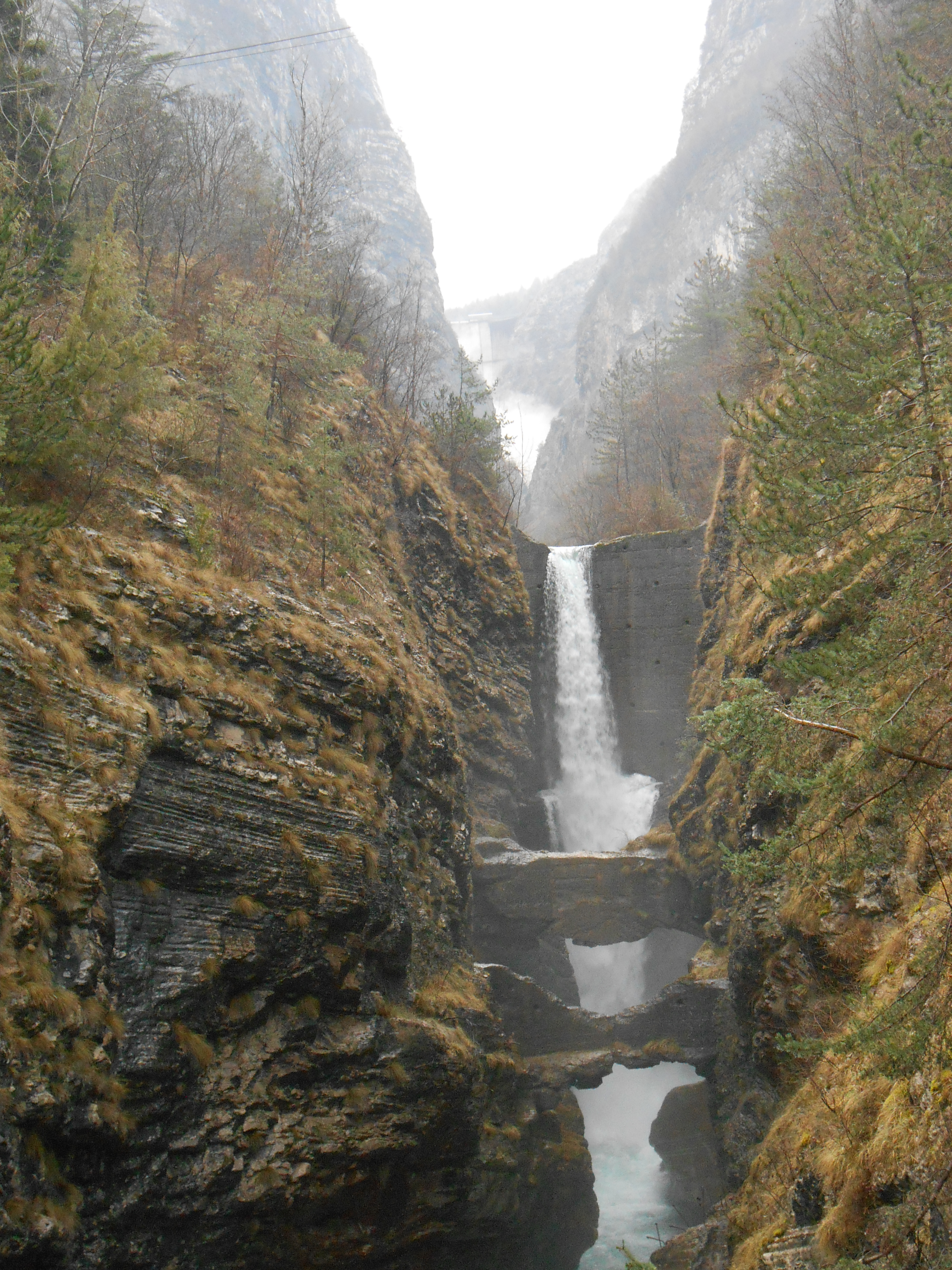

Location
- Country: Italy

Physical characteristics
- Source
  - location: Vajont Valley
  - elevation: 1,896 m
- Mouth: Piave
  - coordinates: 46°15′54″N 12°18′34″E
- Length: 34.6 km
- Basin size: 63.7 km²

Basin features
- Progression: Piave→ Adriatic Sea

The Vajont is a 34 km long torrent in the Northern Italian Province of Pordenone flowing from Friuli-Venezia Giulia (western Friuli) to eastern Veneto. The stream has carved a narrow gorge over time, known as Vajont valley or Valle del Vajont.

== Etymology ==
The term vajont or in dialect, Vajo, appears in documents from 1300, with different spellings: "Vaiote", "Vaion" and "Vajont". It stems from the Latin word "vallis", which means valley. If it is accentuated as "Vallion", it becomes Vajon, "Walloon" or great valley; the final "t" only serves to stress the word. Similar terms can be found in other valleys, such as in the Vicenza Vajo.

== Geography ==
The Vajont originates from a source located in Friuli, in the homonymous Vajont valley, a gorge, between the Forcella col de Pin and the Val Mesaz at about 1900 m above sea level in the Province of Pordenone. It flows in a direction from West to East. At the base of Mount Toc it mounds into the Piave river, just at the height of the municipality of Longarone, almost directly below the Vajont dam, in the province of Belluno. On the right side of the valley are the villages of Erto and Casso (province of Pordenone), connected by the SS 251 with Longarone, in the valley of the Piave, and with Maniago, along the upper valley of the Cellina river.

=== Vajont dam and Monte Toc landslide ===
In the 1920s, Italian Carlo Semenza (engineer) first conceived the Vajont dam; In the 1930s the Società Adriatica di Elettricità SADE undertook the Vajont dam also known as the "Great Vajont" project, as the dam was set to become the highest in the world. Construction of the dam began in the summer of 1956 and reservoir filled in 1960. Meanwhile, on March 22, 1959, an accident at the Lago di Pontesei occurred, where a landslide of 3 million cubic meters of rock slipped into the lake, overwhelming a worker, whose body was never found; it was feared that something like this could happen in Vajont.

On October 9, 1963, at 22:39 about 260 million cubic meters of rock slipped from Mount Toc at a speed of 110 km/h into the reservoir of the lake. The subsequent overflow of water created three waves more than 250 metres high: the first made a sort of turn, lapped Casso and fell on the landslide, forming the lake of Massalezza; the second wave headed towards the villages of Erto, and the third, which proved to be the most disastrous, climbed over the dam which did not yield, and headed towards the Piave valley, hitting Longarone and Spar. Damage also occurred in Soverzene, Ponte nelle Alpi, the Borgo Piave di Belluno up to Quero Vas about 50 km from the Vajont dam. There were 1,917 deaths, though only 1,500 bodies were recovered.

== In Erwin Rommel's diary ==
The Vajont stream and the bridge are mentioned in the diary of Erwin Rommel when, following the events of Battle of Caporetto the then lieutenant, in command of a detachment of Royal Württemberg mountain battalion ("Königlich Württembergisches Gebirgsbataillon"), chased the retreating Italian troops along the Cividale del Friuli - Longarone route. The passage reads: "Some Italian officers on board a car, hunted closely by our cyclist riflemen, are unable to explode the charges already placed in the next bridge: it is the magnificent bridge, an admirable work of Italian military art at more than 150 meters high on the Vajont stream, built with a single arch of 40 meters of light: the highest bridge in Italy!"
