= List of people from Basingstoke =

This is a list of notable people who were born in or near, or have been residents of the Basingstoke, Hampshire, England.

Bold text denotes a person who was born in Basingstoke.

== Arts and humanities ==
- Jane Austen, author
- Hannah Berry, comic artist and author
- **Grace Blakeley**, economics and political journalist
- **Callum Cant**, author and researcher
- **Lucy Coats**, author
- **Alma Deutscher**, composer and conductor
- **L. Grace Dibble**, teacher and travel writer
- John Gardner, author
- **Steve Harris**, author
- Macdonald Hastings, journalist and war correspondent
- E O Higgins, author
- Paul Hockings, author, professor of anthropology
- **Gwyther Irwin**, abstract artist
- John James, architect
- **Waldemar Januszczak**, art critic and filmmaker
- **Sima Kotecha**, journalist
- AJ Pearce, author
- C. Bernard Rutley, author
- **Christopher Sclater Millard**, author
- **Tim Shipman**, journalist
- **Nora Stanton Barney**, civil engineer and suffragist
- Robert Steadman, composer and conductor
- **Julian Stockwin**, author
- Alex Thomson, journalist and newscaster
- Joseph Warton, academic and poet
- **Thomas Warton**, academic and poet
- **Chuck Whelon**, comic author and cartoonist

== Entertainment ==
- **John Arlott**, cricket journalist and commentator
- **Sam Attwater**, actor
- **Carl Barât**, musician
- **Christian Brassington**, actor
- **James Bye**, actor
- Shelley Conn, actress
- **Daisy May Cooper**, actress and writer
- **Mark Griffin**, actor
- Max Harwood, actor
- **Steve Hewlett**, ventriloquist
- **Elizabeth Hurley**, actress and model
- **Steve Lamacq**, DJ
- Tristan Myles, visual effects artist
- **Ian McNeice**, actor
- **Tara Palmer-Tomkinson**, socialite and television personality
- **Gabriella Slade**, musical costume designer
- Lisbee Stainton, musician
- Pete Staples, musician
- **Jodie Steele**, actress
- **Sarah Sutton**, actress
- Ramon Tikaram, actor
- Tanita Tikaram, musician
- Gabriella Wilde, actress
- **Christine Williams**, model
- Xerath, metal band
- **Bob Young**, musician

== Sport ==
- **Joel Bagan**, footballer
- **Sal Bibbo**, footballer
- Alex Bogdanovic, tennis player
- **Nick Buchanan**, cricketer
- **Sid Castle**, footballer and football manager
- **Travis Clayton**, NFL player
- **Tom Cleverley**, international footballer and football manager
- Georgina Corrick, international softball player
- Tom Croft, international rugby union player
- **Matt Crossley**, footballer
- **Harlee Dean**, footballer
- **Sean Doherty**, footballer
- **Darren Flint**, cricketer
- **Dean Francis**, boxer
- **Leanne Ganney**, international ice hockey player
- **Joshua Goodall**, tennis player
- **Robert Heywood**, cricketer
- Paul Hogan, darts player
- Dave Holby, endurance athlete
- **Simon Humberstone**, rugby union player
- **Aaron Jarvis**, footballer
- **Liam Kelly**, footballer
- **Mark Kelly**, international footballer
- **Matt King**, cricketer
- **Olly Lancashire**, footballer
- **Joe McDonnell**, footballer
- **Mike McMeeken**, international rugby league player
- Colin Monk, darts player
- **Lee Nurse**, cricketer
- **Josh Payne**, footballer
- Tom Rees, international rugby union player
- **Kurt Reynolds**, ice hockey player
- Justin Rose, golfer
- **Lee Sandford**, footballer
- **Will Smallbone**, international footballer
- Kathy Smallwood-Cook, Olympic sprinter
- Dominic Solanke, international footballer
- **Mitchell Stokes**, cricketer
- **Kit Symons**, international footballer and football manager
- Robert Tobin, Olympic athlete
- Shaun Udal, international cricketer
- **Rowan Vine**, footballer
- Jock Wallace Jr., footballer and football manager
- **Thomas White**, cricketer
- **Chris Wood**, cricketer
- **Ross Wood**, cricket umpire
- **Ben Wright**, footballer

== Other ==
- Arron Fraser Andrew Banks, businessman and political donor
- **Alice Blunden**, premature burial subject
- Hubert Broad, noted test pilot
- **Laurie Brown**, former Bishop of Birmingham
- Thomas Burberry, founder of Burberry clothing business
- Charles Butler, beekeeper, logician and grammarian
- **David Chidgey, Baron Chidgey**, politician
- **H. E. J. Cowdrey**, historian
- **William Dicey**, newspaper proprietor
- **John Freeman Dunn**, politician
- Ruth Ellis, last woman to be hanged in Great Britain
- Joseph Storrs Fry, founder of Fry's chocolate company
- **Rebecca George**, President of British Computer Society
- **Andrew Holding**, scientific researcher
- George Cecil Jones, chemist and occultist
- Hilary Jones, celebrity doctor
- James Ketchell, adventurer
- **Sir James Lancaster**, privateer and trader
- John Aidan Liddell, Victoria Cross recipient
- Cecil Lowther, politician
- **Charles Massey**, psychical researcher
- Walter de Merton, founder of Merton College, Oxford
- William Paulet, 1st Marquess of Winchester, Statesman
- David Pawson, Baptist minister and author
- William Plowden, politician
- William Sandys, 1st Baron Sandys of the Vyne, Tudor diplomat and Lord Chamberlain
- Sarah Ferguson, former wife of Andrew Mountbatten-Windsor
- **L.E. Timberlake**, American politician
- Lady Anne Wallop, aristocrat
- Arthur Wellesley, 1st Duke of Wellington
