= Carlo Semenza =

Carlo Semenza may refer to:

- Carlo Semenza (engineer) (1893–1961), Italian hydraulic engineer
- Carlo Semenza (neuroscientist) (born 1949), Italian neuroscientist
