= Lake Ravedis =

Artificial lake in Friuli-Venezia Giulia, Italy

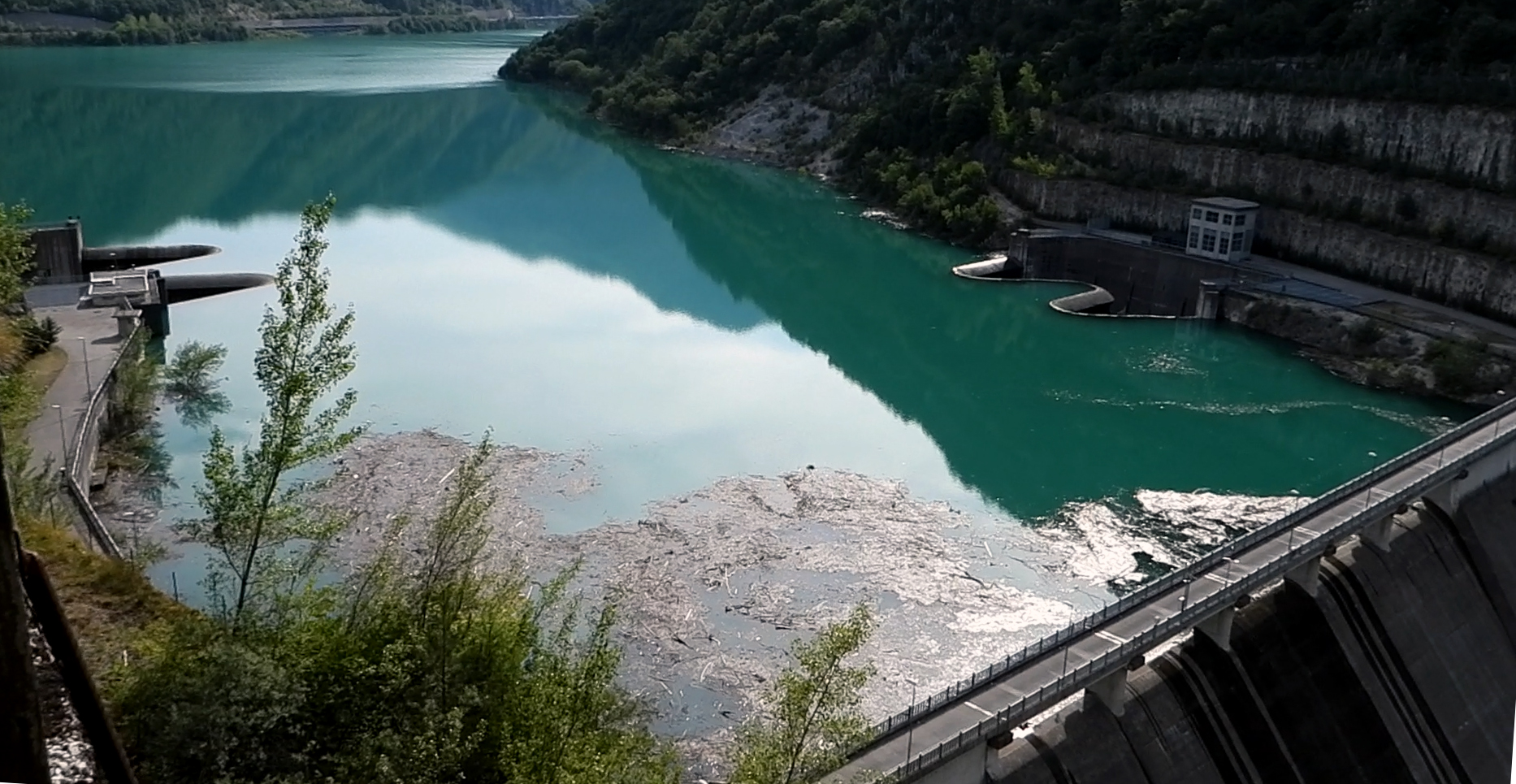
- The lake at maximum level, ready for the bottom drain functionality test

- Location of Lake Ravedis
- Location: Montereale Valcellina, Province of Pordenone, Friuli-Venezia Giulia, Italy
- Coordinates: 46.1685°N 12.6523°E
- Type: Artificial
- Primary inflows: Cellina stream, Molassa stream, Stella stream
- Primary outflows: Cellina stream
- Basin countries: Italy
- Max. length: 7 km (4.3 mi)
- Surface area: 1.2 km^{2} (0.46 sq mi)
- Average depth: 20 m (66 ft)
- Max. depth: 48.5 m (159 ft)
- Surface elevation: 343 m (1,125 ft)

The Lake Ravedis is an artificial lake in the municipal territory of Montereale Valcellina, in the Province of Pordenone. It is 7 km long and approximately 48.5 meters deep, and it contains 25.8 million m³ of water. The maximum impoundment level is 341.00 m a.s.l., the minimum regulation level is 306.50 m a.s.l., and the maximum regulation level is 338.50 m a.s.l.

== History ==
The first project for the construction of the Ravedis dam dates back to the late 1950s; in fact, a double-arch dam was planned at the same location as the current one, about fifty meters high, and together with the Mezzocanale dam (never built upstream of Barcis), it was to be part of the Grande Vajont system.

The tragedy that occurred at Erto e Casso in 1963 halted the project, which resumed several years later in the early 1980s. The great fear caused by the event (which happened just a few kilometers away) led to significant expenditure of available funds to stabilize the valley's slopes through cement injections where the dam was to be built.

However, the actual start of the construction site had to wait nearly thirty years.

After a troubled process regarding the project and contractors, the first stone of the dam was laid in 1986.

After a five-year pause (1994–1999) due to lack of funds, work resumed in May 2001, the dam structure was completed in November 2003, while the completion of the electrical systems and sluices required another 7 years. In the following three years, tests were conducted on all equipment.

In the spring of 2015, the technical-functional testing of the structure had not yet been carried out due to problems with the bottom drain sluices, which, however, did not affect the operation of the reservoir and were expected to be resolved by the spring of 2016.

As of 2022, the dam is still maintained at a safety level, at 318 m a.s.l., with a 77% loss compared to the planned irrigation volume, until the repair and subsequent testing of the bottom drain sluices on the left side are completed.

== Dam ==
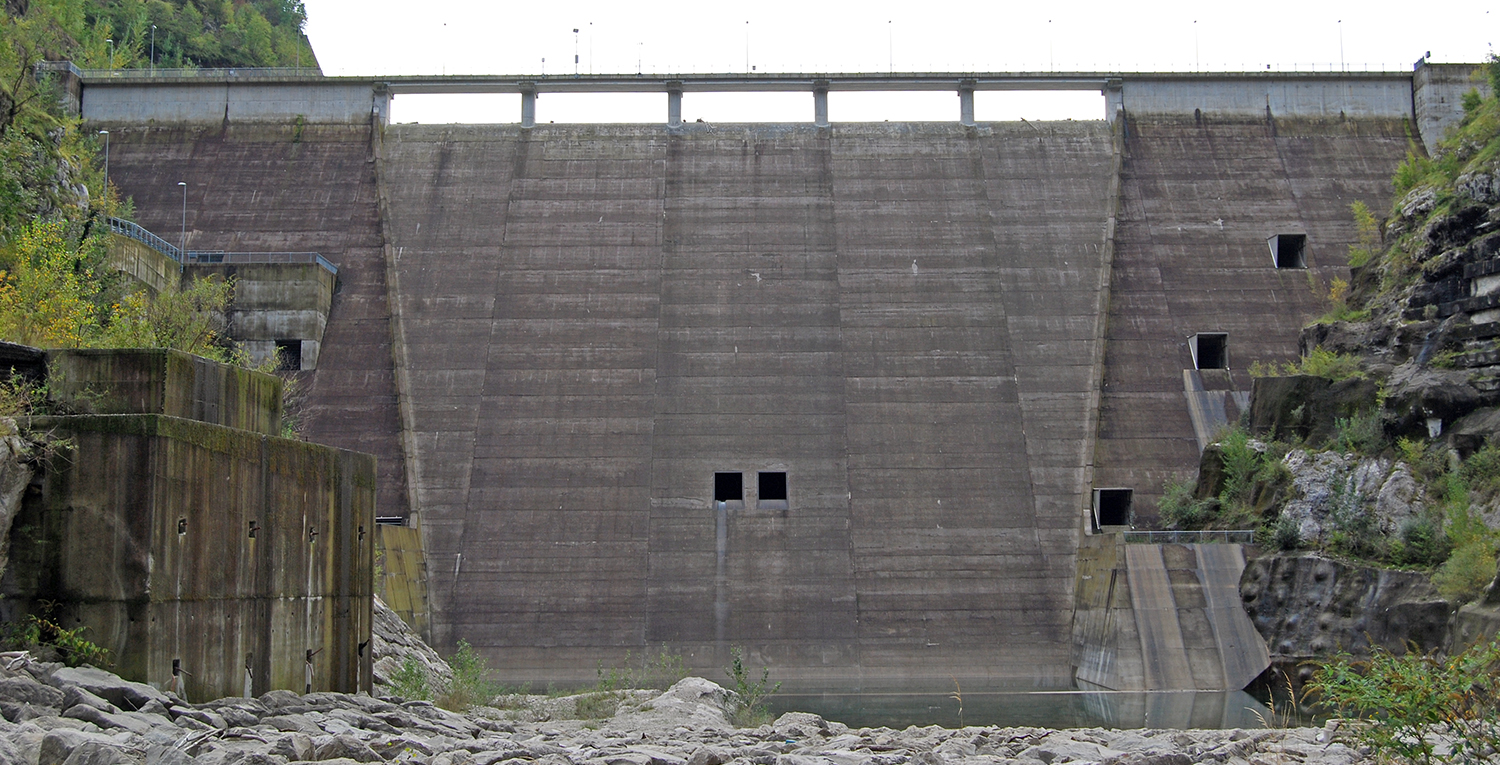
The Ravedis dam, viewed from the valley. In the center are the mid-level and exhaust drains

The geomorphological conditions of the gorge carved by the Cellina stream led to the design of a massive gravity dam with a straight axis, founded directly on the rocky formation through a monolithic base (a sort of enormous foundation plinth) after removing about 40 meters of gravelly alluvial cover and appropriate excavations to regularize the foundation surface. The dam has a volume of 300,000 m³ of concrete. The height at the lowest point is 88 meters.

The drivable crest includes 5 spillway openings, is about 170 m long, and 3.50 m wide.

The dam body is divided into 10 segments: one central segment 18 m wide, eight other segments (four on each side) 16.50 m wide, and an additional segment of 10.50 m on the left.

The stability against the movement of the segments due to hydrostatic pressure is ensured by the monolithic base at the bottom and a continuous shaped cushion on both shoulders.

The hydraulic seal is formed by a double waterproofing screen. A main upstream screen and a downstream counter-screen. The main screen, slightly inclined upstream, reaches a maximum depth of about 70 m in the central valley area and extends into the slopes for about 60 m, where it was created with injections from a system of 8 tunnels built at different levels.

In the monolithic base downstream of the dam, a rounded cradle was incorporated to dissipate the water flow coming from the spillway openings and the mid-level and exhaust drains.

== Drains ==
On the dam crest, five spillway openings, each 15 m wide (75 m total), are arranged for a flow rate of 550 m³/s.

The surface drains consist of two independent lateral spillways shaped as double “duckbills,” with a threshold at 338.50 m, one on the right bank and one on the left. Through a 64 m long collection basin at 328 m elevation and a 45° inclined tunnel chute, they connect to the downstream bottom drain tunnel, downstream of the sluice of said drain. Their flow rate is 700 m³/s.

The bottom drains consist of two circular tunnels (one per bank), 8 meters in diameter and 500 m long, lined with 95 cm thick reinforced concrete, and with the invert composed of basaltic aggregates to ensure good abrasion resistance.

They are controlled by a pair of flat sluices 6 m high and 4.50 m wide, housed in a dedicated chamber located under the surface drain collection basin, about 50 m upstream of the chute-tunnel junction. The sluice chambers are accessible from the surface drain platform via a shaft and a short tunnel.

The inlet of each tunnel is shaped like a “pipe” with a threshold at 308 m a.s.l. for maximum drawdown.

The outlet is shaped as a “ski jump” to prevent downstream erosion phenomena. Studied on a hydraulic model at the Voltabarozzo Experimental Center (Padua) of the Venice Water Authority, it demonstrated full functionality. Overall, they can discharge a maximum flow rate of 1400 m³/s, emptying the lake in just 5 hours.

The mid-level and exhaust drains consist of 1.50 m diameter pipes housed in the central segment of the dam and controlled by valves. The mid-level drain has an inlet at 320 m a.s.l., while the exhaust drain allows the lake to be emptied to a minimum level of 296 m a.s.l. Each of these drains has a flow rate of 37 m³/s.

On the right side of the lake, there is an intake to ensure a constant water flow to the hydroelectric power plants of Ponte Giulio, San Leonardo, San Foca, and Villa Rinaldi.

== Function of the reservoir ==
During adverse weather conditions with heavy rainfall in the Prealps, the risk of flooding for several riverside towns is very high. A catastrophic flood event occurred in 1966; in 2002, a similar tragedy was narrowly avoided. In 2010, weather events comparable to 1966 occurred, and on 2 November of that year, a state of maximum alert was declared. In October 2018, during Storm Vaia, it mitigated the flood of the Cellina stream's mountain basin of 1,400 cubic metres per second (49,000 cu ft/s) mitigating the effects downstream in the lower Pordenone plain.

The dam should help limit such risks, but it is not considered sufficient to eliminate them entirely. Built to have a flood lamination effect, achieved through an opening at the base of the dam designed to ensure 100% of the Cellina stream's normal flow downstream and retain the excess flow upstream during intense rainfall events.

In addition to this, the plant ensures operational continuity for the hydroelectric plants built along the Cellina stream.

== Cellina power plants ==
The construction of the dam led to a significant change in the electro-irrigation axis of the Cellina stream. In 1988, the decommissioning of the Antonio Pitter hydroelectric plant (25 February), Giais hydroelectric plant, and Partidor Hydroelectric Plant (10 May) took place, and they were replaced by two new plants along the course of the Cellina stream.

The first, in the locality of Ponte Giulio, is fed directly by the Ravedis dam, with a pressurized channel 4,511 m long, which, after connecting to the piezometric shaft, feeds two vertical-axis Kaplan turbine-alternator units (head 61.70 m) with a synchronous generator (power 92 MW) through two short metallic penstocks (50.7 m and 47.4 m). The basin and discharge channel are 46 m and 664 m long, respectively.

The second plant, in the hamlet of San Leonardo Valcellina, has a hydraulic scheme and structures similar to those of the Ponte Giulio plant. It receives water from the discharge channel to the loading basin. From the loading basin, a pressurized derivation channel starts, consisting of two approximately 4,400 m long pipes that connect to the base of the piezometric tower. From here, two approximately 70 m long metallic penstocks feed two vertical-axis Francis turbine-alternator units (head 78.52 m) with a synchronous generator (power 125 MW).

The remaining "twin" plants of San Foca hydroelectric plant and Villa Rinaldi hydroelectric plant in the municipality of San Quirino, built by SADE in 1953 and fed by the Lake Barcis, (head of 52.11 m and 48.29 m and vertical-axis Francis turbine-alternator of 5 MW), were upgraded in 1985 with the addition of a second vertical-axis Francis turbine-alternator unit and synchronous generator, both 9 MW. Additionally, in 2013, the restoration of the prestressed concrete penstocks feeding the first installed unit was carried out, with the insertion of 12-meter-long fiberglass pipes over the entire 2,354-meter length.

In 1997, a fifth plant was built near Cordenons. Due to the terrain rich in springs, the Wellpoint system was used in its construction.

The plant derives water from the terminal part of the existing discharge channel of the Villa Rinaldi hydroelectric plant, where the loading basin and intake structure were created. The pressurized derivation channel, approximately 3,780 m long, consists of two buried prestressed concrete pipes that connect to the base of the piezometric tower. From here, a short penstock ends with a distributor with three branches leading to three vertical-axis turbine-alternator units with Francis turbines and asynchronous generators. The water discharged from the plant is returned, via a channel, to the Meduna stream. After the plant's construction, a private company built a mini-hydro plant to use the residual head on the return to the Meduna stream.
