= Tongyang =

Tongyang or Tong Yang may refer to:

- Tongyang Group, South Korean conglomerate
- Tongyang Confectionery, former name of Orion Confectionery, South Korean company formerly owned by the Tongyang Group
- Tongyang Daegu Orions, former name of Goyang Orions, South Korean basketball team formerly owned by the Tongyang Group
- Tongyang Broadcasting Company, South Korean television station owned by Samsung founder Lee Byung-chul
- Tongyang Cup, international Go competition
- Tong Yang Moolsan, South Korean tractor manufacturer
- Tongyang, Hubei (通羊镇), town in and the seat of Tongshan County, Hubei, China
- Tongyang, Jiangsu (潼阳镇), town in Shuyang County, Jiangsu, China
- Tong Yang (mathematician), Chinese mathematician
