= Lorenzo Pareschi =

Italian mathematician

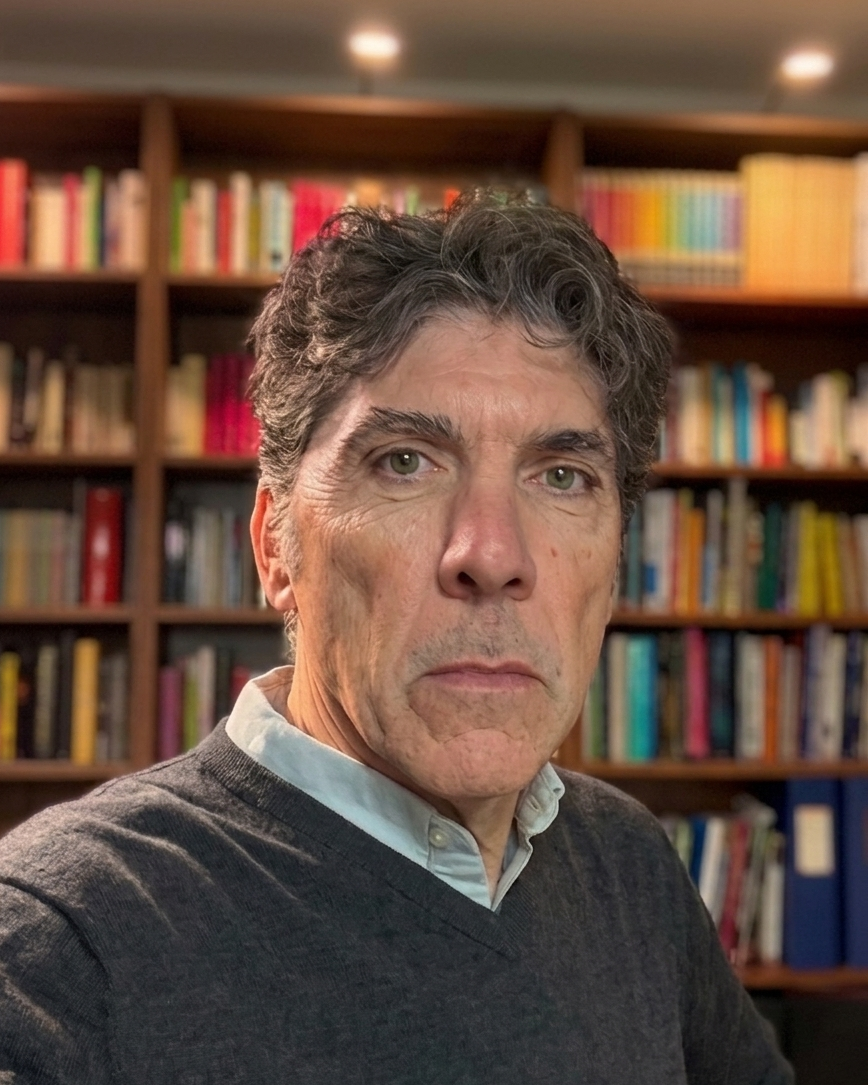
- Lorenzo Pareschi
- Born: 10 August 1966 (age 60); Rimini, Italy
- Education: University of Bologna
- Scientific career
- Workplaces: Heriot-Watt University and University of Ferrara

Lorenzo Pareschi is an Italian mathematician working in numerical analysis, applied mathematics, kinetic theory, and multiscale computational methods. He is Chair of Applied and Computational Mathematics at Heriot-Watt University and professor of numerical analysis at the University of Ferrara.

== Career and research ==
Pareschi received his PhD in mathematics in 1996 from the University of Bologna. He has held visiting and research appointments at institutions including the University of Wisconsin–Madison, Georgia Institute of Technology, Université d'Orléans, Université Paul Sabatier, and the Courant Institute of Mathematical Sciences at New York University.

His research concerns numerical methods for kinetic equations, implicit-explicit methods for partial differential equations, uncertainty quantification, structure-preserving methods, and mathematical models of collective behaviour. He is particularly known for work on the numerical analysis of the Boltzmann equation and related kinetic models, including fast spectral methods for the computation of the Boltzmann collision operator, and for contributions to implicit-explicit Runge-Kutta methods for multiscale hyperbolic systems.

His later work has also included optimisation, control, machine learning, social dynamics, and epidemic modelling.

== Publications ==
Pareschi is the author or co-author of research monographs and advanced texts in numerical analysis and kinetic theory. With Giuseppe Toscani, he co-authored Interacting Multiagent Systems: Kinetic Equations and Monte Carlo Methods, published by Oxford University Press in 2013. In 2024 he co-authored Implicit-Explicit Methods for Evolutionary Partial Differential Equations with Sebastiano Boscarino and Giovanni Russo, published by SIAM.

Among his most cited survey works is the article Numerical Methods for Kinetic Equations, published in Acta Numerica in 2014.

== Editorial work ==
Pareschi has served on the editorial boards of several journals in applied and computational mathematics. In 2025 the Maxwell Institute announced his appointment as the next Editor-in-Chief of Multiscale Modeling & Simulation, with effect from January 2026, and SIAM lists him as Editor-in-Chief for the journal's 2026 volume.

== Honours and awards ==
Among his distinctions are the Nelder Visiting Fellowship at Imperial College London in 2015, the John von Neumann Professorship at the Technical University of Munich in 2019, and a Royal Society Wolfson Fellowship awarded in 2023.

In 2025 he was awarded an Advanced Grant from the Italian Science Fund of MUR for the ADAMUS project, devoted to advanced numerical methods for multiscale systems with uncertainty.
