= Gabriella Vigliocco =

Italian cognitive scientist

- Occupations: Professor of Psychology and Language Sciences

Academic background
- Education: Università degli Studi di Padova (BS); Universita degli Studi di Trieste (PhD)

Academic work
- Discipline: Experimental Psychology
- Institutions: University College of London
- Main interests: Cognitive and Computational Psychology, Linguistics, Language Development, Neuroscience, Iconicity, Sentence Production

Gabriella Vigliocco is an Italian experimental psychologist who conducts research in the field of psycholinguistics, focusing on psychological factors and neural mechanisms underlying people's ability to produce and understand language. Vigliocco's interdisciplinary work draws from cognitive psychology, neuroscience, and computational modeling. She holds a professorship at the University College of London (UCL) in the Division of Psychology & Language Sciences where she is also the director of the Language and Cognition Lab and the director of the Leverhulme Doctoral Training Programme.

Vigliocco was awarded a Royal Society Wolfson Research Merit Award in 2018 and was nominated for UCL's Inclusion Awards for EDI Excellence in 2024. She is a Fellow of the Cognitive Science Society and the Association for Psychological Sciences.

== Biography ==
Vigliocco was born and raised in a small rural village in north Italy near the Alps. She received her B.S. degree in Experimental Psychology at Università degli Studi di Padova in 1990. She attended graduate school at Universita degli Studi di Trieste where she obtained her Ph.D. in Experimental Psychology in 1995 under the advisement of Carlo Semenza. During the last year of her Ph.D. program, in 1994, Vigliocco was awarded a Fulbright scholarship to study grammatical encoding in sentence production. She then went on to complete her postdoctoral research at the University of Arizona with Merrill Garrett.

Vigliocco is Professor of Psychology at the University College of London (UCL). At UCL, she leads the Language and Cognition Lab. Prior to becoming faculty at UCL, Vigliocco served as assistant professor at the University of Wisconsin–Madison. At UCL, she has served as co-director of the Deafness, Cognition and Language (DCAL) Research Centre. She was the Head of Cognitive, Perceptual and Brain Sciences Research Department from 2008 to 2010 and the Acting Head of the Division of Psychology and Language Sciences from 2010 to 2011. Subsequently, Vigliocco served as the Vice Dean of Education from 2014 to 2018. In 2018, Vigliocco took on the role of Director of the Leverhulme Doctoral Training programme for the Ecological Study of the Brain. Outside of UCL, Vigliocco has worked as a resident scientist at the Moss Rehabilitation Research Institute.

Vigliocco has held grants from the James S. McDonnell Foundation, Leverhulme Trust, European Research Council, and the Economic and Social Research Council to study a wide range of topics, including semantic fields, early language acquisition, iconicity, and social influences on learning. She is an active member of Women in Cognitive Science. As a public speaker, she has been featured in the People Behind the Science Podcast series and at various conferences and events.

Outside of her academic work, Vigliocco enjoys spending time with her son and family, cooking, reading, and going to classical music concerts.

== Research ==
Vigliocco's interdisciplinary work combines research methods from cognitive psychology, neuroscience, and computational modeling in an effort to understand how humans learn and use language. As a core theme of her research program, Vigliocco emphasizes the embodied nature of human language and cognition, i.e., how semantic representations of words and other units of language derive from people's sensorimotor interactions with the world and their experiences of emotions and inner states. She conducts experimental studies examining how language is learned in the context of multimodal, face-to-face communication, with a focus on multimodal signals that include representational gestures, eye contact, emotional expression, and intonation. It is through these signals that individuals can communicate turn-taking and abstract meaning. Through her research, Vigliocco highlights the importance of using gesture in language development, noting how contextual information is lost when communicating in non-face-to-face modalities.

Some of her key contributions include understanding how abstract words and concepts are grounded in sensorimotor experience and associated neural processes and how iconicity enhances language processing and development. In one of her most cited papers, Vigliocco and colleagues found that people using both sign and spoken languages leverage iconicity in language processing to help bridge the gap between linguistic forms and conceptual representations. Iconic symbolism can include signs that look like objects, such as holding up your hands to signify you are taking a photo with a "camera". Vigliocco and her colleagues found that caregivers were inclined to include iconic symbols in their language and communication with children when the objects they were referring to were not present, suggesting that gesture is used to aid language development.

At the Language and Cognition Lab at UCL, Vigliocco leads several projects exploring the relationship between language and thought as well as the representation of abstract knowledge.

== Representative publications ==
- Kousta, S.-T., Vigliocco, G., Vinson, D. P., Andrews, M., & Del Campo, E. (2011). The representation of abstract words: Why emotion matters. Journal of Experimental Psychology: General, 140(1), 14–34. https://doi.org/10.1037/a0021446
- Meteyard, L., Cuadrado, S. R., Bahrami, B., & Vigliocco, G. (2012). Coming of age: A review of embodiment and the neuroscience of semantics. Cortex, 48(7), 788–804. https://doi.org/10.1016/j.cortex.2010.11.002
- Perniss, P., Thompson, R. L., & Vigliocco, G. (2010). Iconicity as a general property of language: evidence from spoken and signed languages. Frontiers in psychology, 1, 227. https://doi.org/10.3389/fpsyg.2010.00227
- Vigliocco, G., Vinson, D. P., Druks, J., Barber, H., & Cappa, S. F. (2011). Nouns and verbs in the brain: A review of behavioural, electrophysiological, neuropsychological and imaging studies. Neuroscience & Biobehavioral Reviews, 35(3), 407–426. https://doi.org/10.1016/j.neubiorev.2010.04.007
