= Vajont Dam =

Disused gravity arch dam in Erto e Casso, Italy

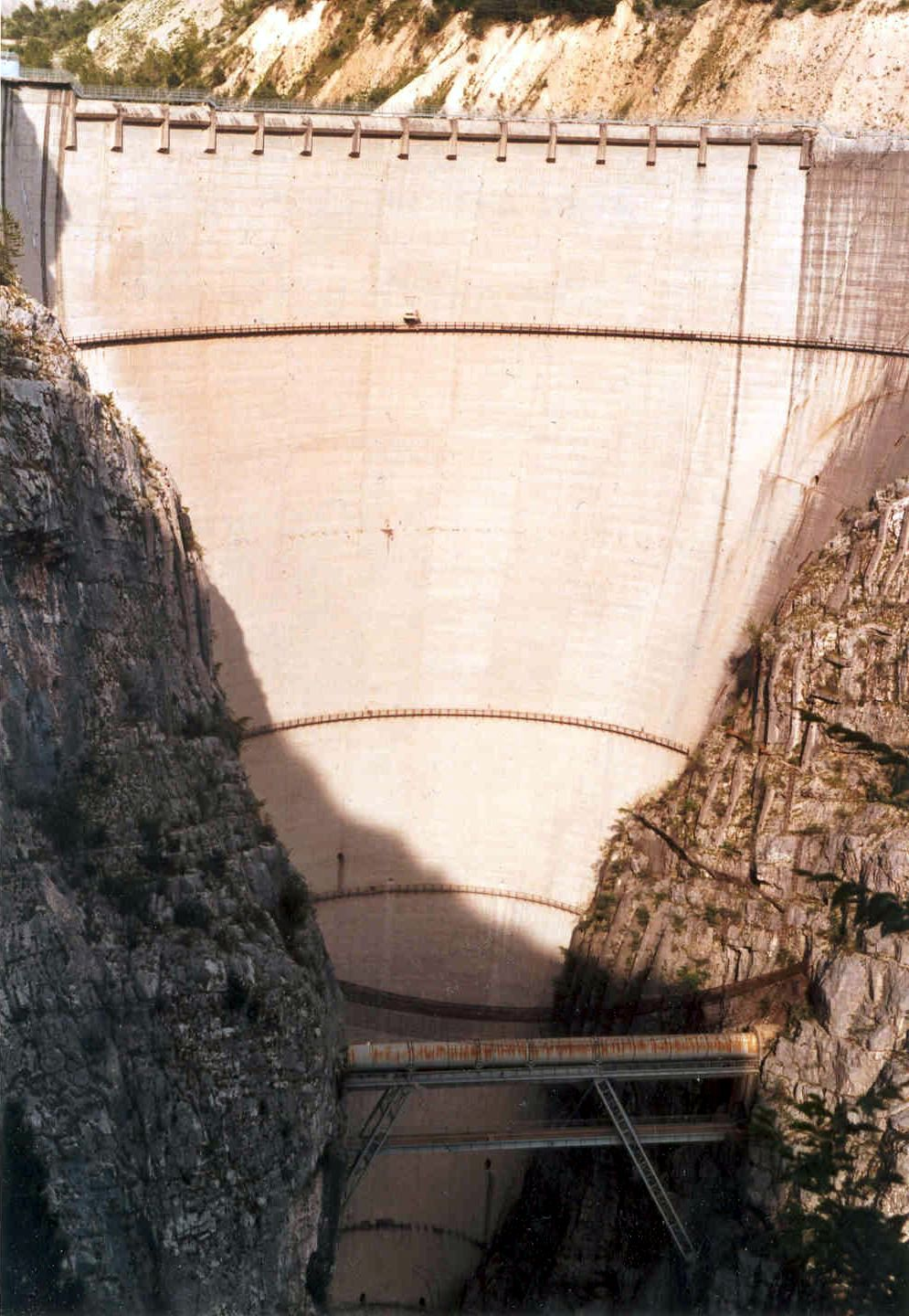
- Vajont Dam in 2002

- Location within Italy
- Official name: Italian: Diga del Vajont
- Location: Italy
- Coordinates: 46°16′02″N 12°19′44″E
- Construction began: 1956
- Designed by: Carlo Semenza
- Owner: ENEL
- Operator: SADE – Società Adriatica di Elettricità (today part of Edison)

Dam and spillways
- Type of dam: Concrete double curvature arch dam
- Impounds: Vajont River
- Height: 262 metres (860 ft)
- Length: 160 metres (520 ft) (chord)
- Width (crest): 3.40 metres (11.2 ft).
- Width (base): 27 metres (89 ft)

Reservoir
- Creates: Lago del Vajont
- Total capacity: 168,715 thousand cubic metres (5,958,100×10^{3} cu ft)

Power Station
- Turbines: 4

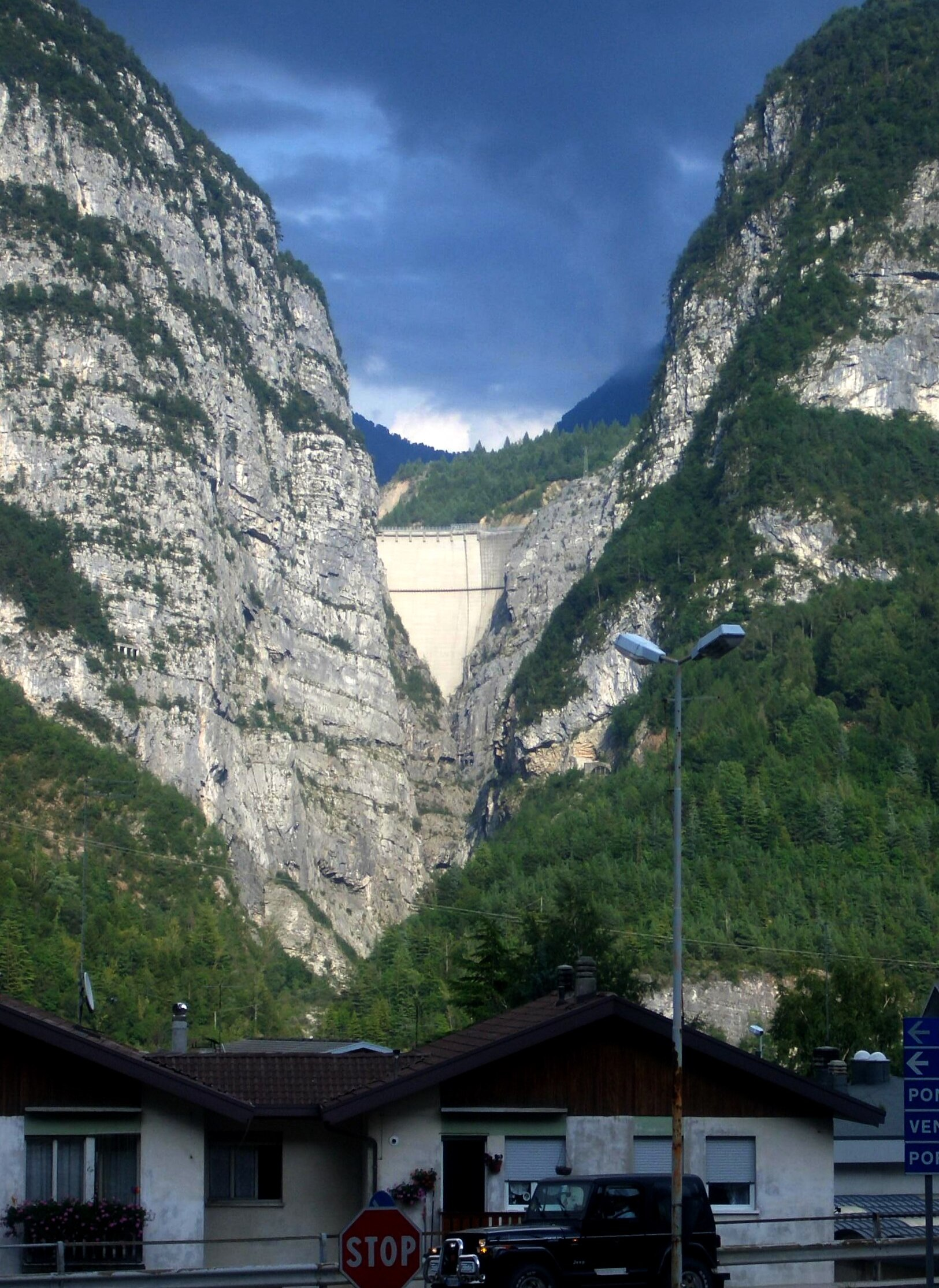
The Vajont Dam as seen from the village of Longarone in 2005, showing roughly the top 60–70 m (200–230 ft) of concrete. The wall of water that overtopped the dam by 250 m (820 ft) and destroyed this village and all nearby villages on 9 October 1963 would have obscured virtually all of the blue sky in this photo.

The Vajont Dam or Vaiont Dam is a disused hydro-electric dam in the valley of the Vajont river under Monte Toc, in the municipality of Erto e Casso, 100 kilometres (60 mi) north of Venice, Italy. It is one of the tallest dams in the world, with a height of 262 m (860 ft).

The dam was conceived in the 1920s and eventually built between 1957 and 1960 by Società Adriatica di Elettricità, at the time the electricity supply and distribution monopoly in northeastern Italy. The engineer was Carlo Semenza (1893–1961). In 1962, the dam was nationalized and came under the control of ENEL as part of the Italian Ministry of Public Works.

On 9 October 1963, during initial filling of the lake, a landslide caused a megatsunami in which 50,000,000 m^{3} (1.8×10^{9} cu ft) of water overtopped the dam in a wave of 250 m (820 ft), bringing massive flooding and destruction to the Piave Valley below, destroying several villages and towns, causing an estimated 1,900 to 2,500 deaths. The dam remained almost intact and two-thirds of the water was retained behind it.

This event occurred after ENEL and the Italian government concealed reports and dismissed evidence that Monte Toc, on the southern side of the lake, was geologically unstable. They had disregarded numerous warnings, danger signals, and adverse appraisals. Underestimating the size of the landslide, ENEL's attempt to safely mitigate any landslide by lowering the level of the lake came too late, when disaster was almost imminent.

== Geography ==
The dam is located in the valley of the Vajont river under Monte Toc, in the municipality of Erto e Casso, 100 kilometres (60 mi) north of Venice, Northern Italy.

== Construction ==
The dam was built by Società Adriatica di Elettricità (SADE), the electricity supply and distribution monopoly in northeastern Italy. The owner, Giuseppe Volpi di Misurata, had been Mussolini's minister of finance for several years. The "tallest dam in the world", across the Vajont Gorge, was conceived in the 1920s to harness the Piave, Maè, and Boite Rivers, to meet the growing demand for power generation and industrialization. The project was not authorized until 15 October 1943, after the confusion following Mussolini's fall during World War II was resolved.

The dam wall had a volume of 360,000 m^{3} (13×10^{6} cu ft) and held up to 168.7×10^{6} m^{3} (5.96×10^{9} cu ft) of water. The dam and basin were intended to be at the centre of a complex water-management system in which water would have been channeled from nearby valleys and artificial basins at higher levels. Tens of kilometres of concrete pipes and pipe bridges across valleys were planned.

In the 1950s, SADE's monopoly was confirmed by post-fascist governments, and it bought the land despite opposition from the communities of Erto and Casso in the valley, which was overcome by government and police support. SADE stated that the geology of the gorge had been studied, including analysis of previous landslides, and that the mountain was held to be sufficiently stable.

Construction work on the dam started in 1957. By 1959, shifts and fractures in the ground were noticed while building a new road on the side of Monte Toc. This led to further studies in which three experts separately told SADE that the entire side of Monte Toc was unstable and was likely to collapse into the basin if the filling were completed, due to the raised water level increasing the instability. SADE took no notice and construction was completed in October 1959. In February 1960, SADE was authorised to start filling the lake. In 1962, the dam was nationalized and came under the control of ENEL as part of the Italian Ministry for Public Works.

== Early signs of disaster ==
On 22 March 1959, during construction of the Vajont Dam, a landslide at the nearby Pontesei Dam created a 20-metre-high (66 ft) wave that killed one person. Throughout the summer of 1960, minor landslides and earth movements were noticed. Instead of heeding these warning signs, the Italian government chose to sue the handful of journalists reporting the problems for "undermining the social order".

On 4 November 1960, with the water level in the reservoir at about 190 m (620 ft) of the planned 262 m (860 ft), a landslide of about 800,000 m^{3} (30×10^{6} cu ft) collapsed into the lake. SADE stopped the filling, lowered the water level by about 50 m (160 ft), and started to build an artificial gallery in the basin in front of Monte Toc to keep the basin usable even if additional landslides (which were expected) divided it into two parts.

In October 1961, after the completion of the gallery, SADE resumed filling the reservoir under controlled monitoring. In April and May 1962, with the basin water level at 215 m (705 ft), the people of Erto and Casso reported five "grade five" Mercalli intensity scale earthquakes. SADE downplayed the importance of these quakes, and was then authorized to fill the reservoir to the maximum level.

In July 1962, SADE's own engineers reported the results of model-based experiments on the effects of further landslides from Monte Toc into the lake. The tests indicated that a wave generated by a landslide could overtop the crest of the dam if the water level was 20 m (66 ft) or less from the dam crest. SADE therefore decided that a reduced level 25 m (82 ft) below the crest would prevent any displacement wave from over-topping the dam.

In March 1963, the dam was transferred to the newly constituted government service for electricity, ENEL. During the following summer, with the reservoir almost completely filled, landslips, shakes, and movements of the ground were repeatedly reported by the alarmed population. On 15 September 1963, the entire side of the mountain slid by 22 cm (8.7 in). On 26 September 1963, ENEL decided to slowly empty the basin to 240 m (790 ft). By early October 1963, the collapse of the mountain's south side looked unavoidable; in one day, it moved almost 1 m (3 ft).

== Tests of the hydraulic model of the Vajont tank ==
After the discovery of the landslide on the northern slopes of Monte Toc, it was decided to deepen the studies on these effects:

- Dynamic actions on the dam
- Wave effects in the reservoir and possible dangers for nearby locations, with particular attention to the town of Erto
- Hypothesis of a partial breakage of the dam and consequent examination of the rout wave and its propagation along the last stretch of the Vajont and along the Piave, up to Soverzene and beyond

The study of point 1 was performed at the Experimental Institute for Models and Structures (ISMES) of Bergamo, while for the others, the SADE decided to build a physical-hydraulic model of the basin, in which to perform some experiments on the effects of a landslide fall in a reservoir.

The 1: 200 scale model of the basin, which can still be visited today, was set up at the SADE hydroelectric plant in Nove (Borgo Botteon di Vittorio Veneto), and became the Hydraulic Models Centre. The experiments were entrusted to professors Ghetti and Marzolo, university professors of the Institute of Hydraulics and Hydraulic Constructions of the University of Padua, and were carried out with funding of SADE, under the control of the study office of the company.

The study aimed to verify the hydraulic effects on the dam and on the banks of the landslide reservoir, so was directed in this sense rather than reproducing the natural phenomenon of the landslide. The experiments were carried out in two different series (August–September 1961 and January–April 1962), of which the first served substantially to refine the model.

=== First set of experiments ===
The first series of five experiments began on 30 August 1961, with a sliding surface of the flat landslide inclined by 30°, consisting of a wooden plank covered with a sheet. The sliding mass was simulated with gravel, held in place by flexible metal nets, which were initially held in position by ropes that were then suddenly released. At the beginning of September, another four tests were carried out intended for orientation purposes. The first always with a 30° inclined plane, the following three with a 42° inclined plane. Having found it impossible to reproduce the natural geological phenomenon of the landslide in the model, the model was elaborated by modifying the movement surface of the landslide, which was replaced with a masonry one (the relative profiles were elaborated by Semenza, who also used the surveys that had already been carried out and that had provided sufficient elements of judgment in this sense), to make it possible to vary the speed of the landslide fall into the reservoir (made difficult by the new "back" shape of the movement surface). To simulate the compactness of the moving material (which in the model remained the gravel), rigid sectors were inserted that were towed by ropes pulled by a tractor.

=== Second set of experiments ===
In the second set of 17 experiments, conducted from 3 January 1962, to 24 April 1962, the "collapsing" material was still gravel, this time held in place by hemp nets and cords. Starting from the Muller hypothesis relating to the different characteristics of the mass moving between the downstream part of the Massalezza stream (west) and the upstream part of the same (east), all the experiments were performed by making those two hypothetical parts of the landslide descend separately. In the model, however, the two landslides were initially made to descend at different times, so that their effects were totally separate, and subsequently, when the wave produced by the first came back, so as to obtain a total increase in the water of the even greater lake.

=== Final Ghetti report ===
The total increase of the water in the tank (measured by means of special instruments) was broken down into "static increase", which was the nontransient effect of increasing the level of the water left in the tank after the landslide due to the immersion of the landslide in the tank (once the state of rest is reached again), and in "dynamic boost", due to the temporary wave motion produced by the landslide. The static increase depended on the volume of the landslide that remained immersed in the tank, while the dynamic boost depended almost exclusively on the speed of the landslide fall (while it was negligibly linked to the volume of the same).

Based on this simulation (following the disaster object of criticism, as considered approximate by some), placing a reservoir limit at an altitude of 700 m (2,300 ft) predicted that no damage would occur above 730 m (2,400 ft) above mean sea level along the banks of the reservoir, while a minimum quantity of water would have exceeded the edge of the dam (722.5 m (2,370 ft)), causing negligible damage downstream of the same.

With the reported experiences, carried out on a 1:200 scale model of the Vajont lake-reservoir, we tried to provide an evaluation of the effects that will be caused by a landslide, which is possible to occur on the left bank upstream of the dam. . Given that the extreme limit downstream of the landslide is more than 75 m from the embankment of the dam, and that the formation of this embankment is of compact and consistent rock and well distinct, even geologically, from the aforementioned mass, it is absolutely not to be fear of any static perturbation to the dam with the occurrence of the landslide, and therefore only the effects of the wave rise in the lake and in the overflow on the dam crest as a consequence of the fall are to be considered.

INSTITUTE OF HYDRAULICS AND HYDRAULIC CONSTRUCTIONS OF THE UNIVERSITY OF PADUA MODEL CENTER "E. SCIMEMI"

EXAMINATION ON THE HYDRAULIC MODEL OF THE EFFECTS OF A POSSIBLE LANDSLIDE IN THE VAJONT LAKE TANK

... The forecasts on the modalities of the landslide event are very uncertain from a geological point of view. Partial falls of limited extent occurred in the last months of 1960 in the lower part of the moving bank in conjunction with the initial, and still partial, filling of the reservoir. The landslide formation extends over a total front of 1.8 kilometres (0.97 nmi; 1.1 mi), from an altitude of 600 metres (2,000 ft) to an altitude of 1,200 metres (3,900 ft) asl (maximum height of the reservoir lake-reservoir 722.50 metres (2,370.4 ft) a.s.l.). The geological examination leads to the recognition of a presumable conchoidal flow surface, on which the landslide mass, consisting mainly of incoherent material and groundwater debris, reaches a thickness of 200 metres (660 ft) in the central part (astride the shaft of the Massalezza stream). The slope of the slope is steeper in the lower part overlooking the lake; a collapse of this part would probably have been followed by the steepening of the upper mass. It is to be considered that any descent of the landslide is unlikely to occur simultaneously on the entire front; on the other hand, the hypothesis that one or the other of the two areas located upstream or downstream of the Massalezza stream will descend first, and that this steep slope will be followed, at a more or less short interval, by that of the remaining area. ...

... These data seem sufficiently indicative of the extent that the wave phenomenon can present even in the most unfavorable forecasts of the fall of the landslide. It should be noted that the rise found near the dam is always higher than that which occurs in the more distant areas along the shores of the lake. Moving on to consider the effects of the landslide that occurs in the lake that is not completely encased, we have from the evidence that already with the reservoir brought to an altitude of 700 m s.l.m. the most unfavorable event, namely the fall of the valley area in 1 min. following a previous fall in the upstream area, it barely causes, with a 27 metres (89 ft) rise. Near the dam (and a maximum of 31 metres (102 ft) at 430 metres (1,410 ft) from it) an overflow just over 2,000 cubic metres per second (71,000 cu ft/s). Starting from the reservoir altitude 670 metres (2,200 ft) a.s.l. even with the fastest landslide, the rise is very limited and well below the overflow ridge.

Therefore, it seems to be possible to conclude that, starting from the reservoir to the maximum flooded, the descent of the expected landslide mass only in catastrophic conditions, i.e. occurring in the exceptionally short time of 1-1.30 minutes, could produce an overflow point of the order of 30,000 cubic metres per second (1,100,000 cu ft/s), and a wave rise of 27.5 metres (90 ft). As soon as this time is doubled, the phenomenon is attenuated below 14,000 cubic metres per second (490,000 cu ft/s) of overflow and 14 metres (46 ft) of elevation.

By decreasing the altitude of the initial reservoir, these overflow and overflow effects are rapidly reduced, and already the altitude of 700 metres (2,300 ft) a.s.l. can be considered absolutely certain with regard to even the most foreseeable catastrophic landslide event. ...

... It will in any case be opportune, in the foreseen continuation of the research, to examine on the suitably prolonged model the effects in the Vajont bed and at the confluence in the Piave of the passage of flood waves of an entity equal to that indicated above for possible dam. In this way there will be more certain indications on the possibility of allowing even greater reservoirs in the lake-reservoir, without danger of damage downstream of the dam in the event of a landslide ...

Padua 3 July 1962

THE RESEARCH DIRECTOR

(Prof. Ing. Augusto Ghetti)

== Landslide and wave ==
Vajont Landslide
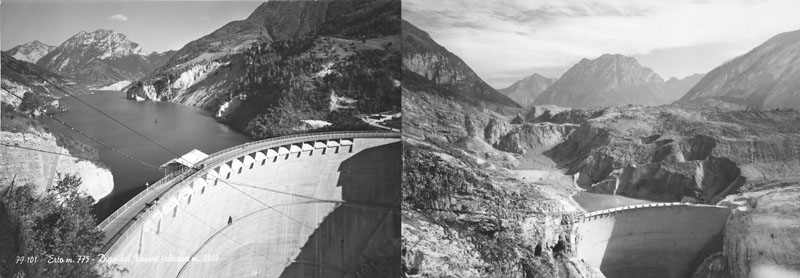
- Vajont dam and reservoir before (left) and shortly after the disaster of 9 October 1963 (right): Note the 260×10^{6} m^{3} (9.2×10^{9} cu ft) landslide, which broke off from Monte Toc and fell into the artificial basin.
- Native name: Italian: Disastro del Vajont
- Date: 9 October 1963
- Time: 22:39 (CET)
- Location: 46°16′02″N 12°19′44″E
- Type: Dam failure
- Cause: Underestimated speed and mass of landslide of Monte Toc
- Deaths: (1,917 or (2,056))
- Missing: 1,300
- Property damage: 500 Billion Lira (1963); 8 Billion USD (2026)
- Charges: Manslaughter

The alarming rate of movement of the landslide had not slowed as a result of lowering the water level, although the water had been lowered to what SADE believed was a safe level to contain the displacement wave should a catastrophic landslide occur. On 9 October 1963, engineers witnessed trees falling and rocks rolling down into the reservoir where the predicted landslide would take place. With a major landslide now seeming imminent, engineers gathered at the site that evening to witness the tsunami which, when it happened, killed 60 workers.

At 10:39 pm, a massive 2-kilometre-long (1.1 nmi; 1.2 mi) landslide, with around 260×10^{6} m^{3} (9,200×10^{6} cu ft) - approximately the volume of the Great Pyramid of Giza - worth of trees, earth, and rock, collapsed from the northern flank of Monte Toc into the lake below at up to 110 km/h (31 m/s; 59 kn; 68 mph) (another source gives 25 m/s (90 km/h; 49 kn; 56 mph)), generating a seismic shock. In 20 seconds it reached the water level; by 45 seconds the landslide (now at rest) had completely filled the Vajont reservoir. The impact displaced 115×10^{6} m^{3} (4,100×10^{6} cu ft) of water in about 25 seconds, 50×10^{6} m^{3} (1,800×10^{6} cu ft) of which overtopped the dam in a 250-metre-high (820 ft) wave.

Impact of the landslip with the water generated three waves. One went upwards, reached the houses of Casso, fell back onto the landslide, and travelled onwards to dig the basin of the pond of Massalezza. Another wave headed toward the shores of the lake, and by washout action, destroyed some localities in the municipality of Erto e Casso. The third wave (containing about 50×10^{6} m^{3} (1,800×10^{6} cu ft) of water) rose over the edge of the dam, which remained intact except for the roadway that led to the left side of the Vajont, and fell into the narrow valley below the dam.

The roughly 50×10^{6} m^{3} (1,800×10^{6} cu ft) of water that climbed over the dam reached the stony shore of the Piave Valley and swept up substantial debris, which poured into the southern sector of Longarone and destroyed the town except for the town hall, also destroying the houses north of it, as well as other neighboring towns. The death toll was about 2,000 people (official data speak of 1,917 victims, but determining an accurate number with certainty is impossible).

Firefighters who set out from Belluno, after reports of the raising of the level of the Piave, could not reach the location, since from a certain point onwards, the road coming from the valley had been completely swept away. Longarone was reached by firefighters who departed Pieve di Cadore, who were the first to realize what had happened and were able to communicate it. At 5:30 a.m. on 10 October 1963, the first soldiers of the Italian Army arrived to bring relief and recover the dead. The soldiers involved were mostly Alpini, some of whom belonged to the combat engineers, who dug by hand to seek the bodies of the missing. They also found bank safes too damaged to be opened with normal keys. The firefighters from 46 Provincial Commands also participated in the rescue, with 850 men, including divers, land and helicopter teams, and many vehicles and equipment. The Nucleo Sommozzatori of Genoa, with eight personnel, were used in the basin in front of the Busche Dam, to dredge for bodies and drums of toxic substances (61 cyanide drums), with subsequent patrol by immersion and final removal of sludge when the basin was dry. Of the nearly 2,000 fatalities, only 1,500 bodies were recovered and recomposed, of which half were beyond identification.

In the Piave Valley the wave destroyed the villages of Longarone, Pirago, Rivalta, Villanova, and Faè, killing approximately 2,000 people and turning the land below the dam into a flat expanse of mud with an impact crater 60 m (200 ft) deep and 80 m (260 ft) wide. Many small villages near the landslide along the lakefront suffered damage from a giant displacement wave. Villages in the territory of Erto e Casso and the village of Codissago, near Castellavazzo, were largely destroyed.

Estimates of the dead range from the official estimate of 1,917 to 2,500 people. About 350 families lost all family members. Most of the survivors had lost relatives and friends along with their homes and belongings. The dam was largely undamaged. The top 1 m (3.3 ft) or so of masonry was washed away, but the basic structure remained intact and is standing today.

== Causes and responsibility ==
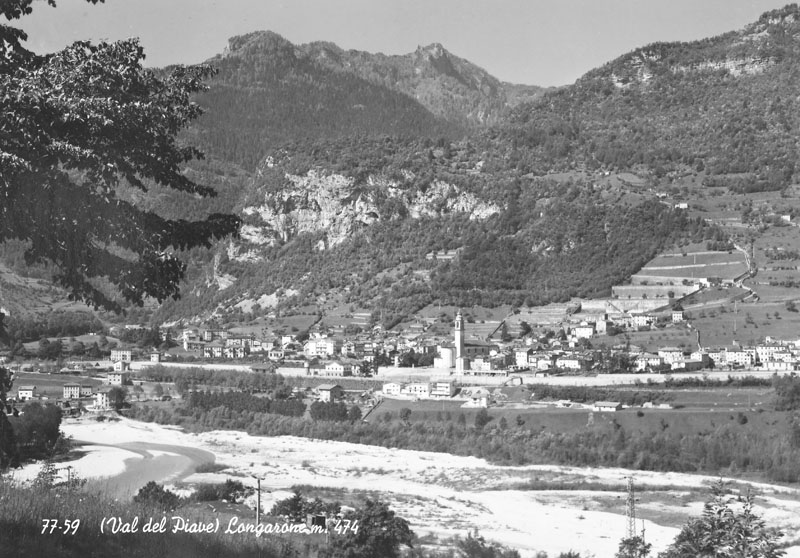
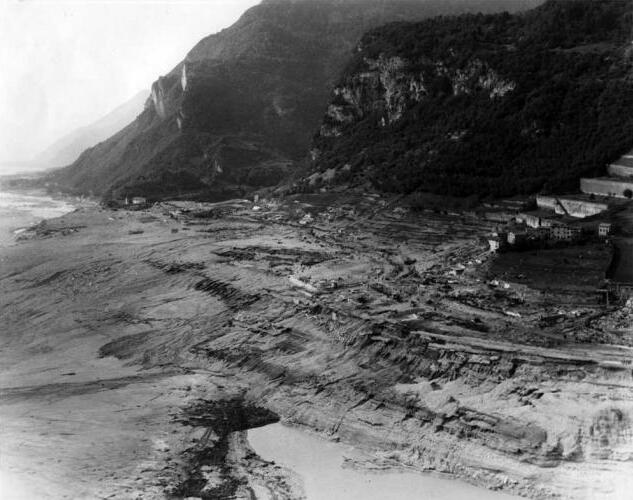
View of the village of Longarone, which was below the dam, before (left) and after (right) the disaster

Immediately after the disaster, the government (which owned the dam), politicians, and public authorities insisted on attributing the tragedy to an unexpected and unavoidable natural event. The debate in the newspapers was heavily influenced by politics. The paper l'Unità, the mouthpiece of the Partito Comunista Italiano (PCI), was the first to denounce the actions of the management and government, as it had previously carried a number of articles by Tina Merlin addressing the behaviour of the SADE management in the Vajont project and elsewhere. Indro Montanelli, then the most influential Italian journalist and a vocal anticommunist, attacked l'Unità and denied any human responsibility; l'Unità and the PCI were dubbed "jackals, speculating on pain and on the dead" in many articles by La Domenica del Corriere and a national campaign poster paid for by the Christian Democracy, the party of Prime Minister Giovanni Leone. They attributed the catastrophe only to natural causes and God's will.

The campaign accused the PCI of sending agitprops into the refugee communities, as relief personnel; most of them were partisans from Emilia Romagna who fought on Mount Toc in the Second World War and often had friends in the stricken area. The Christian Democracy accused the Communist Party of "political profiteering" from the tragedy. Leone promised to bring justice to the people killed in the disaster. A few months after he lost the premiership, he became the head of SADE's team of lawyers, who significantly reduced the amount of compensation for the survivors and ruled out payment for at least 600 victims.

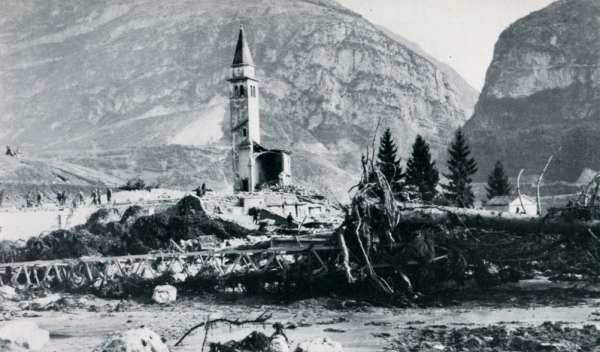
The bell tower that remained standing at Longarone. The rest of the church building was swept away, as were almost all of the other structures in the village.

The DC's newspaper, La Discussione, called the disaster "a mysterious act of God's love", in an article that drew sharp criticism from l'Unità. Apart from journalistic attacks and the attempted cover-up from news sources aligned with the government, flaws in the geological assessments have been proven, with disregard of warnings about the likelihood of a disaster by SADE, ENEL, and the government. The trial was moved to L'Aquila, in Abruzzo, by the judges who heard the preliminary trial, thus preventing public participation, and resulted in lenient sentencing for a handful of the SADE and ENEL engineers. One SADE engineer (Mario Pancini) committed suicide in 1968. In 1997, Montedison (which had acquired SADE) was ordered to compensate the municipalities affected by the disaster.

Subsequent engineering analysis has focused on the cause of the landslide, and debate continues about the contribution of rainfall, dam level changes, and earthquakes as triggers of the landslide, as well as differing views about whether it was an old landslide that slipped further or a completely new one. A number of problems existed with the choice of site for the dam and reservoir; the canyon was steep-sided, the river had undercut its banks, and the limestone and claystone rocks that made up the walls of the canyon were interbedded with the slippery, clay-like Lias and Dogger Jurassic-period horizons and the Cretaceous-period Malm horizon, all of which were inclined towards the axis of the canyon. In addition, the limestone layers contained many solution caverns that became only more saturated because of rains in September. Prior to the landslide that caused the overtopping flood, the downhill creep of the regolith had been 1.01 cm (0.40 in) per week. In September, this creep reached 25.4 cm (10 in) per day until finally, the day before the landslide, the creep was measured at 1 m (3.3 ft).

== Reconstruction ==
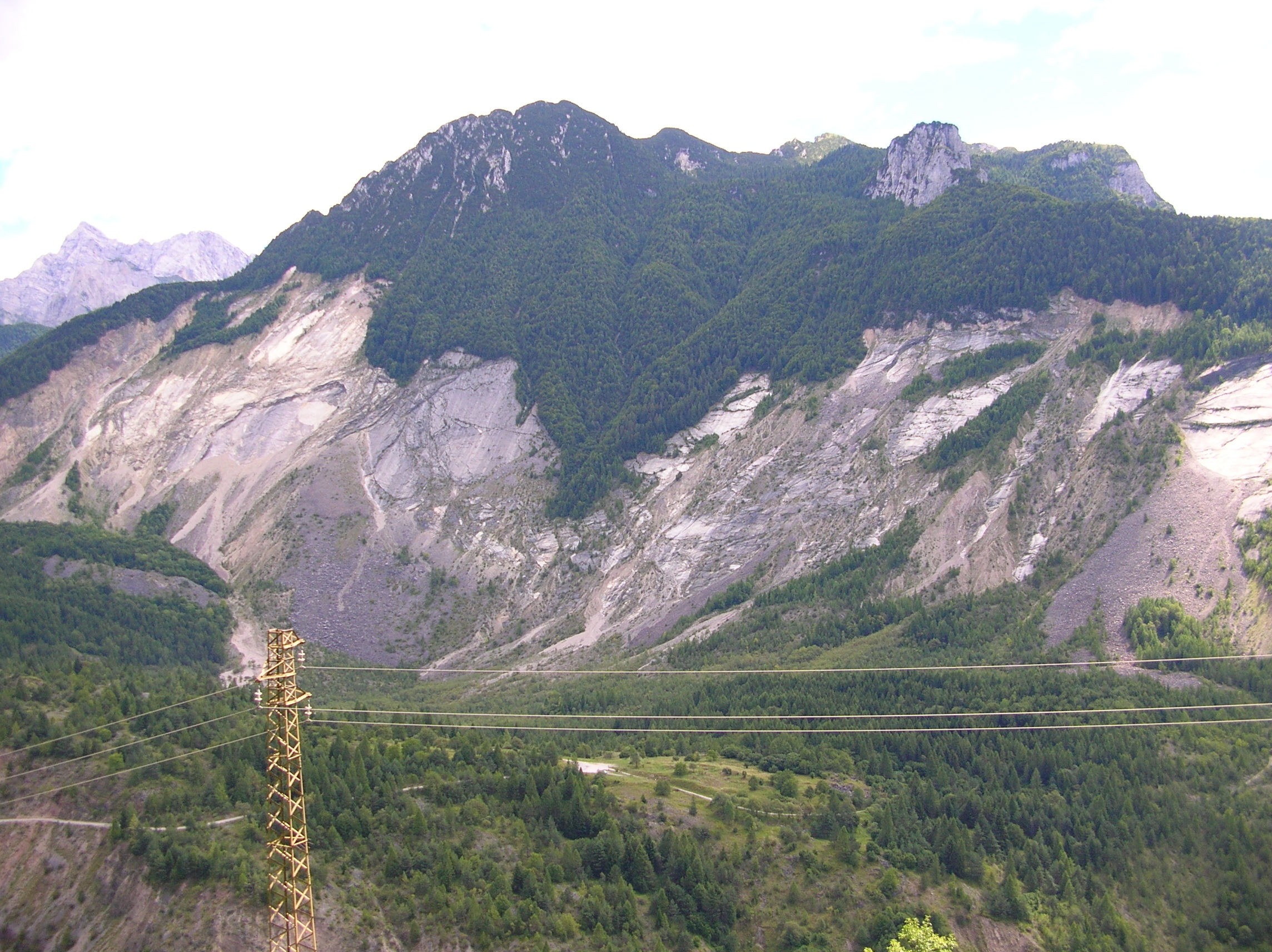
The area of the 1963 landslide on Monte Toc, taken in 2005

Most of the survivors were moved into a newly built village, Vajont, 50 km (31 mi) southeast on the Tagliamento River plain. Those who insisted on returning to their mountain life in Erto e Casso were strongly discouraged. Longarone and other villages in the Piave Valley were rebuilt with modern houses and farms. The government used the disaster to promote the industrialization of northeastern Italy. Survivors were entitled to "business start-up" loans, public subsidies, and 10 years of tax exemption, all of which they could "sell on" to major companies from the Veneto region. These concessions were then converted into millions of lira for industrial plants elsewhere. Among the corporations were Zanussi (now owned by Electrolux), Ceramica Dolomite (now owned by American Standard), Confezioni SanRemo, and SAVIC (now owned by Italcementi).

A pumping station was installed in the dam basin to keep the lake at a constant level, and the bypass gallery was lengthened beyond the dam to let the water flow down to the Piave Valley. The dam wall is still in place and maintained, but no plans exist to exploit it for electric power. The reservoir behind the dam, now dry and filled with landslip, has been open to visitors since 2007.

== Memorials and public access ==
Both researchers with specialist interest and sightseer have revived interest in the dam. The dam, now owned by ENEL, was partially opened to the public in 2002 with guided tours and access to the walkway along the top and other locations. In September 2006, an annual noncompetitive track event, called "Paths of Remembrance", was inaugurated, which allows participants to access some locations inside the mountain. On 12 February 2008, in launching the International Year of Planet Earth, UNESCO cited the Vajont Dam tragedy as one of five "cautionary tales" caused by "the failure of engineers and geologists".

For 2013, on the occasion of the 50th anniversary of the disaster, the region Veneto set aside one million euros for safety works and recovery of tunnels inside the mountain, which were part of the Colomber Road (the old national road 251). The memorial church in Longarone—constructed in spite of the strong opposition of the surviving parish priest—was built by architect Giovanni Michelucci.

== In the media ==
After the initial worldwide reporting, the tragedy became regarded as part of the price of economic growth in the 1950s and 1960s. Interest was rejuvenated by a 1997 television program by Marco Paolini and Gabriele Vacis, Il racconto del Vajont. In 2001, a docudrama about the disaster was released. A joint production of Italian and French companies, it was titled Vajont—La diga del disonore ("Vajont—The Dam of Dishonour") in Italy, and La Folie des hommes (The Madness of Men) in France. It stars Michel Serrault and Daniel Auteuil. The tragedy was included in the 2008 documentary series Disasters of the Century.

The TV show Seconds from Disaster featured the event in episode two, "Mountain Tsunami", of its fifth season in 2012. In 2013, the 11th stage of the Giro d'Italia finished in Vajont to commemorate the 50th anniversary of the disaster. In March 2018, the dam and the disaster were also covered in season two, episode one ("Armageddon Highway") of Science Channel's Mysteries of the Abandoned.

== See also ==
- List of natural disasters by death toll
- List of dams and reservoirs
- Malpasset Dam
- Seiche
- St. Francis Dam
