= Edwin Hancock =

British computer scientist (1956–2024)

- Born: 24 June 1956
- Died: 19 January 2024 (aged 67)
- Education: Durham University (BSc, PhD, D.Sc.)
- Awards: Fellow of the Royal Academy of Engineering; Royal Society Wolfson Research Merit Award; IEEE Fellow; FInstP; FIET; Fellow IAPR
- Scientific career
- Fields: Computer vision; Pattern recognition; Complex networks
- Workplaces: Rutherford Appleton Laboratory; Open University; University of York
- Thesis: The π π Ʌ channel from K^{-}p reactions in the Ʌ (1690) region (1981)
- Website: cs.york.ac.uk/~erh

Edwin Hancock, FREng (24 June 1956 – 19 January 2024) was a British computer scientist at the University of York who specialised in computer vision and pattern recognition.

== Education ==
Edwin Hancock graduated with a Bachelor of Science degree in physics in 1977, a PhD in high energy nuclear physics in 1981 and a Doctor of Science degree by publication in 2008 from Durham University. His PhD thesis was entitled "The π π Ʌ channel from K^{-}p reactions in the Ʌ (1690) region" and his D.Sc. thesis "Contributions to pattern recognition and computer vision".

== Career ==
Hancock was Emeritus Professor of Computer Vision in the Department of Computer Science at the University of York, and Adjunct Professor and Principal Investigator of the Beijing Innovation Centre for Big Data and Brain Computing at Beihang University. He commenced his research career in the field of high energy nuclear physics, working on bubble chamber experiments performed at CERN and SLAC between 1977 and 1984. During this period he used partial wave analysis to study the angular momentum resonances of Ʌ and Σ hyperons and was involved in the first determination of charm quark lifetimes.

In 1985 he changed fields to work in computer science, and most recently undertook research in the use of graph-based methods in computer vision, pattern recognition and complex networks. He focused on how pattern recognition and machine learning can be performed using data in the form of graphs, trees and strings. He was best known for his work on graph matching and spectral graph theory. He also worked on physics based vision, where he has focused on how to recover surface shape and surface sub-structure from information conveyed by the scattering of light and from polarisation measurements. He has published extensively on these topics.

Hancock was elected Fellow of the Royal Academy of Engineering in 2021, named Fellow of the Institute of Electrical and Electronics Engineers (IEEE) in 2016 for contributions to pattern recognition and computer vision, and as a Fellow of the International Association for Pattern Recognition in 2000. He was awarded a doctorate honoris causa by the University of Alicante in 2015. In 2016 he was appointed Editor-in-Chief of the journal Pattern Recognition. Between 2016 and 2018 he was second vice-president of the International Association for Pattern Recognition. Between 2009 and 2014, he held a Royal Society Wolfson Research Merit Award. In 1991 he was awarded the Seventeenth Annual Pattern Recognition Award, for his paper titled "Discrete Relaxation", co-authored with Josef Kittler and published in the journal Pattern Recognition, and in 1999 an honourable mention in the Twentyfourth Award for the paper "Matching Delaunay Graphs", with Andrew M. Finch and Richard C. Wilson. The British Machine Vision Association awarded him its Distinguished Fellowship for 2016. In 2018 he received the Pierre Devijver Award from the International Association for Pattern Recognition.

== Death ==
Hancock died from cancer on 19 January 2024, at the age of 67.

== Selected publications ==
Research Articles

- Richard C. Wilson, Edwin R. Hancock, Structural Matching by Discrete Relaxation. IEEE Trans. Pattern Anal. Mach. Intell. 19(6): 634–648 (1997).
- Andrew D. J. Cross, Edwin R. Hancock, Graph Matching With a Dual-Step EM Algorithm. IEEE Trans. Pattern Anal. Mach. Intell. 20(11): 1236–1253 (1998).
- Philip L. Worthington, Edwin R. Hancock, New Constraints on Data-Closeness and Needle Map Consistency for Shape-from-Shading. IEEE Trans. Pattern Anal. Mach. Intell. 21(12): 1250–1267 (1999).
- Bin Luo, Edwin R. Hancock, Structural Graph Matching Using the EM Algorithm and Singular Value Decomposition. IEEE Trans. Pattern Anal. Mach. Intell. 23(10): 1120–1136 (2001).
- Marco Carcassoni, Edwin R. Hancock, Correspondence Matching with Modal Clusters. IEEE Trans. Pattern Anal. Mach. Intell. 25(12): 1609–1615 (2003
- Richard C. Wilson, Edwin R. Hancock, Bin Luo, Pattern Vectors from Algebraic Graph Theory. IEEE Trans. Pattern Anal. Mach. Intell. 27(7): 1112–1124 (2005).
- Antonio Robles-Kelly, Edwin R. Hancock, Graph Edit Distance from Spectral Seriation. IEEE Trans. Pattern Anal. Mach. Intell. 27(3): 365–378 (2005).
- William A. P. Smith, Edwin R. Hancock, Recovering Facial Shape Using a Statistical Model of Surface Normal Direction. IEEE Trans. Pattern Anal. Mach. Intell. 28(12): 1914–1930 (2006).
- Andrea Torsello, Edwin R. Hancock, Learning Shape-Classes Using a Mixture of Tree-Unions. IEEE Trans. Pattern Anal. Mach. Intell. 28(6): 954–967 (2006).
- Gary A. Atkinson, Edwin R. Hancock, Shape Estimation Using Polarization and Shading from Two Views. IEEE Trans. Pattern Anal. Mach. Intell. 29(11): 2001–2017 (2007).
- Huaijun Qiu, Edwin R. Hancock, Clustering and Embedding Using Commute Times. IEEE Trans. Pattern Anal. Mach. Intell. 29(11): 1873–1890 (2007).
