= Giuseppe Colombo (engineer) =

Italian engineer (1836–1921)

- Colombo in 1886
- Born: December 18, 1836; Milan, Italy
- Citizenship: Italian
- Education: University of Pavia (Engineering); University of Pavia (Architecture)
- Known for: Co-founding Edison

Giuseppe Colombo (1836–1921) was an Italian engineer, entrepreneur, academic, and politician. He is noted for his significant contribution to the industrial development of Milan and Italy during the late 19th and early 20th centuries. He co-founded Edison and is credited for establishing the first commercial electric power plant in Europe.

== Background ==
Colombo was born to a lower-middle-class family on December 18, 1836, in Milan. His father was a goldsmith and influenced the young Colombo, who also became drawn to the technical-scientific world. At 17 years old, he studied engineering and architecture at the University of Pavia under Francesco Brioschi and Giovanni Codazza. By 19, Colombo became the assistant of the latter, who was teaching applied mechanics. He graduated a year later and started working as a professor at Milan's Società d'Incoraggiamento d'Arti e mestieri (SIAM). He then transferred to the Polytechnic University of Milan in 1863, the year of its founding, and served as rector from 1897 to 1921.

Colombo also started writing articles about machines, steam engines, and equipments among others in the La Perseveranza. He established the National technical-scientific Committee in Milan to establish and strengthen collaboration between universities and industry as a way to drive Italian economic and political power.

In 1859, he fought in the Second Italian War of Independence and did the same in 1866 serving in the Italian Volunteer Corps of Giuseppe Garibaldi. Colombo's Committee also gave contributions to the Italian war efforts through the experimental laboratory for building materials at the Polytechnic University of Milan.

== Colombo and Europe's first power station ==
The Dinamo Edison was built for Europe's first power plant that illuminated Milan.

Colombo was cited as the man behind the harnessing of Lombardy's water resources in 1883 and credited for building Milan's and Europe's first electric power station. The Edison company built the electric power plant powered by steam motors. Colombo pioneered the original idea behind the project. After visiting a Paris exhibition and the New York's Pearl Street power station two years prior, he realized the efficiency of replacing gas with electric lighting.

Colombo convinced the Edison company to build the project as well as entrepreneurs such as Carlo Erba, a pharmaceutical industrialist, and bankers to fund the initiative. The facility was built at the center of tMilan on the grounds of an old, disused theater at Via Santa Radegonda. Colombo oversaw the powerstation with the assistance of electrical engineers, Henry C. Patterson and John William Lieb. This pioneering initiative marked the beginning of significant investment in electricity, particularly those the focused on alternating current (e.g. Acquoria di Tivoli) and hydroelectric plants. By 1900, the power station supplied about 50,000 incandescents and 1,000 arcs to Milan.

== Recognition ==
The Triennial Giuseppe Colombo Prize, which awards scientific and practical achievements in the field of engineering, was established in Colombo's honor.
