= Nora de Leeuw =

Computational chemist and researcher

Nora de Leeuw FRSC CChem MAE FLSW
- Born: Nora Henriette de Leeuw
- Education: Open University; University of Bath (PhD)
- Awards: Royal Society Wolfson Research Merit Award (2010); Royal Society of Chemistry Interdisciplinary Prize (2023); Catalysis Society of South Africa Eminent Visitor Award (2023)
- Scientific career
- Fields: Computational chemistry
- Workplaces: University of Leeds; Cardiff University; University College London; Birkbeck, University of London; University of Reading; Utrecht University; University of Bath
- Thesis: Atomistic simulation of the structure and stability of hydrated mineral surfaces (1997)
- Doctoral advisor: Stephen Parker
- Website: eps.leeds.ac.uk/staff/5852/professor-nora-de-leeuw

Nora Henriette de Leeuw FRSC CChem MAE FLSW is Professor of Computational Materials Science at the University of Leeds. Her research field is computational chemistry focussed on biomaterials, sustainable energy, and carbon capture and utilisation.

== Early life and education ==
De Leeuw studied chemistry at the Open University and graduated in 1994. She joined the University of Bath as a graduate student, earning a PhD under the supervision of Stephen C. Parker in 1997. Her doctoral research considered polymorphs of calcium carbonate, which can be used for carbon sequestration. She worked as a postdoctoral researcher at the University of Bath until 2000.

== Research and career ==
De Leeuw is interested in the development and application of computational models of energy materials, biomaterials and minerals. She uses molecular dynamics and density functional theory calculation to elucidate materials properties and processes.

In 2000 she joined the University of Reading as a lecturer in Physical Chemistry. Following the award of an Engineering and Physical Sciences Research Council (EPSRC) Advanced Research Fellowship in 2002, she moved to the School of Crystallography at Birkbeck, University of London where she was promoted to associate professor in 2004.

In 2007, De Leeuw was appointed as professor of computational materials science at University College London. There, she designed computational models of olivine dust grains, a mineral that is common to the Solar System, and studied how it interacted with water at high temperatures. She demonstrated that the grains could hold water at temperatures up to 630 °C. She also studied the chemistry of hot vents on the sea floor, which De Leeuw proposed could produce the organic molecules essential for life. De Leeuw has pioneered the modelling of biomaterials, such as the carbonated hydroxyapatite present in bone and teeth. She investigated the nucleation of calcium carbonate. De Leeuw was awarded a Royal Society Wolfson Research Merit Award in 2010.

She was awarded a Royal Society industrial fellowship to study how radiation impacted materials for nuclear energy. In 2014 De Leeuw was awarded an Atomic Weapons Establishment (AWE) William Penney Fellowship. At University College London, De Leeuw directed the Centre for Doctoral Training (CDT) in molecular modelling & materials science. She is also a member of the EPSRC programme on energy materials. She uses computer-aided design to create new catalysts for the conversion of carbon dioxide to fuels.

In 2015, de Leeuw joined Cardiff University as Pro-Vice-Chancellor International. She was a member of the low-carbon economy research group, an EPSRC supported multi-institutional collaboration that looks to convert carbon dioxide to fuels and chemicals. She led the Cardiff University - Kwame Nkrumah University of Science and Technology - University of Namibia Chem4Energy programme, which developed novel solar materials and benign catalysts. She holds a professorship in theoretical geochemistry at Utrecht University and University of Paris-Est.

At Cardiff University, de Leeuw worked on the university's European strategy and collaborations. These included Horizon 2020, the Erasmus Programme and the Bologna Process.

From 2020 to 2026, de Leeuw was the inaugural Executive Dean of the newly formed Faculty of Engineering and Physical Sciences at the University of Leeds, where she remains as Research Professor of Computational Materials Science.

=== Awards and honours ===
Her awards and honours include:

- 2008 Elected Fellow of the Royal Society of Chemistry (FRSC)
- 2016 Elected Fellow of the Learned Society of Wales (FLSW)
- 2017 Elected member Academia Europaea (MAE)
- 2023 Eminent Visitor Award by the Catalysis Society of South Africa
- 2023 Award of the Interdisciplinary Prize by the Royal Society of Chemistry
