= Andrew Holding =

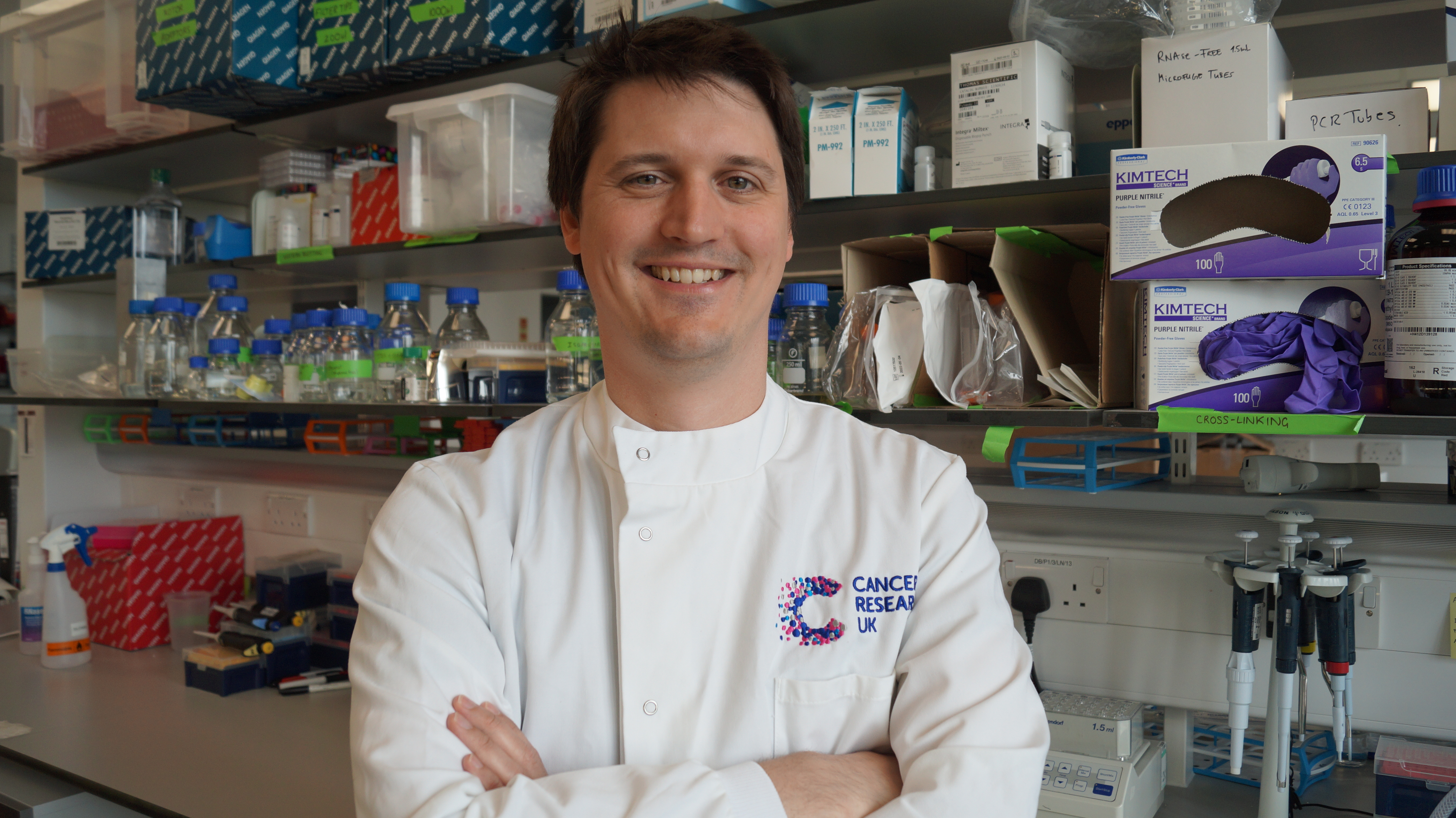
- Born: Andrew Nicholas Holding; Basingstoke
- Education: Whitgift School; Hertford College, Oxford
- Awards: CRUK Rising Star in Research Engagement Prize(2015); 175 Faces of Chemistry; British Science Association Media Fellowship (2012); Wellcome Trust People Award (2012)
- Scientific career
- Fields: Chemistry; Molecular Biology; Cancer Biology
- Workplaces: University of York; University of Cambridge; University of Oxford
- Thesis: Studies on the biosynthesis of non-ribosomal peptides (2009)
- Doctoral advisor: Dr Jonathan B Spencer; Dr Finian Leeper
- Website: www.andrewholding.com

Andrew Holding MChem (Oxon), PhD MRSC leads an academic research group at the University of York. His current research focus is the genetic drivers of breast cancer and has previously published research on antibiotic biosynthesis and DNA replication. Previously Holding was a Fellow of Downing College, Cambridge, a Turing Fellow at The Alan Turing Institute and led the experimental team in the Markowetz lab at the Cancer Research UK Cambridge Institute (a department at the University of Cambridge).

== Career ==
Holding was educated at Whitgift School, Croydon and went on to graduate from University of Oxford with a Masters in Chemistry (MChem). In 2005 he moved to Cambridge to study at the University of Cambridge's Department of Chemistry. The work he undertook towards his PhD focused on the biosynthesis of antibiotics used in the treatment of MRSA and involved both organic chemistry and microbiology. After completing his PhD in 2009 he moved to the MRC Laboratory of Molecular Biology as a Career Development Fellow, where his research focused on the structural analysis of protein complexes using mass spectrometry.

In 2013 he moved to Cancer Research UK's Cambridge Institute to direct the experimental research programme of Florian Markowetz's computational research group. Concurrently he was a Fellow of Downing College, Cambridge and an Associate Governor of The Vine Inter-Church Primary School.

In 2019, Holding moved to the University of York where he currently leads a research team focusing on the effects of steroids on cancer. Specifically, Holding's team investigates how glucocorticoids drive different responses in different tissues and how this leads to an increases risk of metastasis in breast cancer patients.

Holding has worked with many organisation to promote his interests in science including The Guardian and the BBC, also covering feminism and religion. His 2013 show 'What If... We Were All Cyborgs?' for BBC World Service was selected by Radio 4 as one their "Pick of the Week". In 2019, Holding worked with the BBC World Service to use his skills as a scientist to recreate Ernest Beaux and Bourjois’s fragrance Soir de Paris from his grandfather's notebook.

== Awards and honours ==
In 2012 Holding was awarded a British Science Association Media Fellowship to work at BBC Horizon.

Holding was selected as one of 175 faces of Chemistry by the Royal Society of Chemistry for a combination of his research in "fields of science crucial for improving human wellbeing" and his investment of "huge amounts of time and energy in establishing science communication, engagement, and outreach initiatives for scientists and laypeople alike".

In 2015 he received a national "Rising Star" award from Cancer Research UK in recognition of "his outstanding work on raising awareness about research".

== Personal ==
Holding is married and has two daughters.
