= Royal Society Wolfson Fellowship =

A 5-years fellowship awarded since 2000

- Awarded for: A five-year salary enhancement to help recruit or retain scientists in the UK
- Sponsored by: Royal Society; Wolfson Foundation
- Formerly called: Royal Society Wolfson Research Merit Award (2000-2020)
- Website: royalsociety.org/grants/royal-society-wolfson-fellowship/

The Royal Society Wolfson Fellowship, known as the Royal Society Wolfson Research Merit Award until 2020, is a 5-years fellowship awarded by the Royal Society since 2000. The scheme is described by the Royal Society as providing long-term flexible funding for senior career researchers recruited or retained to a UK university or research institution in fields identified as a strategic priority for the host department or organisation.

It is administered by the Royal Society and jointly funded by the Wolfson Foundation and the UK Office of Science and Technology, to provide universities "with additional financial support to attract key researchers to this country or to retain those who might seek to gain higher salaries elsewhere." to tackle the brain drain. They are given in four annual rounds, with up to seven awards per round.

Since 2021, the Royal Society Wolfson Fellowships program has expanded to include a Visiting Fellowship strand.

== Recipients ==
Winners of this award (see Royal Society Wolfson Research Merit Award holders) award included:

- Sue Black
- Samuel L. Braunstein
- Martin Bridson (2012)
- Michael Bronstein (2018)
- Peter Buneman
- Michael Cant (2015)
- José A. Carrillo (2012)
- Ken Carslaw
- Marianna Csörnyei
- Candace Currie (2015)
- Nicholas Dale (2015)
- Roger Davies
- René de Borst
- Nora de Leeuw
- Philip A. Ernst (2022)
- Jonathan Essex
- Ernesto Estrada
- Wenfei Fan
- Michael Farber (2004)
- Jonathan Essex
- Andrea C. Ferrari
- Philip A. Gale (2013)
- Matthew Gaunt (2015)
- Alain Goriely (2010)
- Georg Gottlob
- Andrew Granville (2015)
- Peter Green
- Ruth Gregory
- Martin Hairer
- Edwin Hancock
- Mark Handley
- Nicholas Higham
- Simone Hochgreb (2003)
- Saiful Islam (2013)
- Brad Karp
- Tara Keck
- Rebecca Kilner (2015)
- Daniela Kuhn (2015)
- Ari Laptev
- Tim Lenton
- Malcolm Levitt
- Stephan Lewandowsky
- Leonid Libkin
- Jon Lloyd (microbiologist) (2015)
- Andy Mackenzie
- Barbara Maher (2006-2012)
- Vladimir Markovic
- Robin May (2015)
- Paul Milewski
- E.J. Milner-Gulland
- Tim Minshull (2015)
- André Neves
- Peter O'Hearn
- William Lionheart (2015)
- Lorenzo Pareschi
- Fabrice Pierron
- Alistair Pike
- Gordon Plotkin
- Adrian Podoleanu (2015)
- Fernando Quevedo (2003)
- David Richardson
- Gareth Roberts (2015)
- Alexander Ruban (2015)
- Daniela Schmidt (2015)
- Steven H. Simon
- Nigel Smart
- John Smillie (2015)
- Stefan Söldner-Rembold (2013)
- John Speakman
- David Stephenson (2015)
- Kate Storey (2015)
- Andrew Taylor (2015)
- Françoise Tisseur (2014)
- Richard Thomas
- Vlatko Vedral (2007)
- Gabriella Vigliocco (2018)
- Benjamin Willcox (2015)
- Richard Winpenny (2009)
- Philip J. Withers (2002)
- Tim Wright (2015)
- Ziheng Yang
- Xin Yao (2012)
- Nikolay I. Zheludev
- Florian Markowetz (2017)
