= Tong Yang (mathematician) =

Chinese mathematician

Tong Yang 杨彤
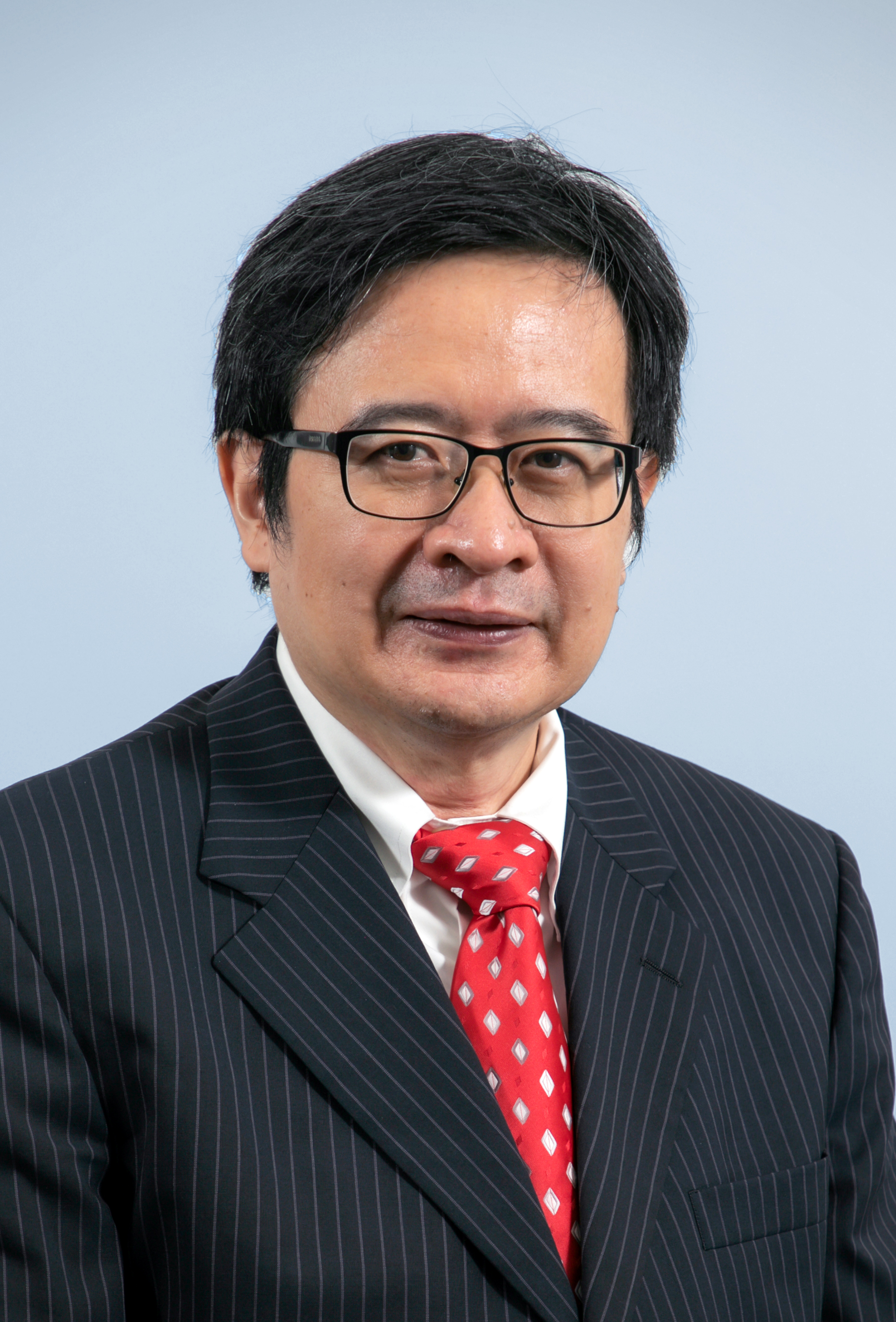
- Education: Zhongshan University; University of California, Davis, USA
- Awards: Morningside Silver Medal of Mathematics (1998) Chair Professor, Changjiang Scholars Program (2005) Croucher Senior Research Fellow (2011) Second-class Award, State Natural Science Award, China (2012) Foreign Member, the European Academy of Sciences (2018) First-class Award in Natural Sciences, Higher Education Outstanding Scientific Research Output Award (Science and Technology),Ministry of Education, China (2019) RGC Senior Research Fellow Award 2020/21 Fellow of the American Mathematical Society (2021) Member of the World Academy of Sciences (2021) Member of the Hong Kong Academy of Sciences (2021) First-class Award in Natural Sciences, Higher Education Outstanding Scientific Research Output Award (Science and Technology), Ministry of Education, China (2022) Foreign member of Academia Europaea (2022) Kuok Group Endowed Professor in Mathematical Science (20204-2029)
- Scientific career
- Fields: Partial differential equations and kinetic theory
- Workplaces: Department of Applied Mathematics, The Hong Kong Polytechnic University
- Doctoral advisor: J. Blake (John) Temple...

Tong Yang (Chinese: 杨彤) is a Chinese mathematician known for his contributions to the field of partial differential equations and kinetic theory. He has been serving as a Chair Professor of Mathematical Science in the Department of Applied Mathematics at The Hong Kong Polytechnic University (PolyU) since 2020. Previously, he held the position of President of The Hong Kong Mathematical Society from 2016 to 2020 in 2016-2020.

== Education ==
Yang completed his Ph.D. in 1993 at the University of California, Davis in USA, after earning his bachelor's and master's degrees from Zhongshan University in 1987 and 1990, respectively.

== Research ==
Yang's research focuses on partial differential equations and kinetic theory. In collaboration with Tai-Ping Liu, he introduced the Liu-Yang functional, which is used to evaluate the stability of BV solutions in systems of hyperbolic conservation laws. This work addressed significant challenges in the well-posedness theory for conservation laws and has applications in various fields.

Additionally, Yang and his collaborators developed a new macro-micro decomposition for the Boltzmann equation to study its fluid phenomena, facilitating the application of analytical techniques used in conservation laws.

== Awards ==
Yang has been recognized as one of the World's Top 2% most-cited scientists by Stanford University from 2020 to 2024. He received the Morningside Silver Medal of Mathematics "for his contributions to the well-posedness theory for hyperbolic conservation laws". In 2011/12, he was awarded The Croucher Senior Research Fellowship for his work on mathematical theories related to the Boltzmann equation He also received the second-class award of 2012 State Natural Science Award in China for his project on "conversation laws and the Boltzmann equation"

In 2019, Yang earned the first-class award in Natural Sciences of the Higher Education Outstanding Scientific Research Output Award (Science and Technology) by the Ministry of Education of China for his joint work on well-posedness of the Prandtl equation in Sobolev spaces. He received another first-class award in 2022 for his work on mathematical theory of compressible Navier-Stokes equations and related models. In 2020/2021, he was awarded the RGC Senior Research Fellowship by the University Grants Committee for his project "Some Mathematical Theories for Kinetic Systems".

Yang has been elected to various prestigious memberships and fellowships. In 2018, he became a Foreign Fellow of the European Academy of Sciences for his contributions to science and technology. He was named a Fellow of the American Mathematical Society for his work on hyperbolic conservation laws and kinetic equations. In 2021, he was elected as a member of the World Academy of Sciences for his fundamental contributions to hyperbolic conservation laws, kinetic theories, boundary layer theories, and high Reynolds number limit. He became a member of Academia Europaea in 2022
