= Simone Hochgreb =

Brazilian mechanical engineer

Simone Hochgreb is a Brazilian mechanical engineer whose research has concerned efficiency and pollution in internal combustion engines, and the structure of premixed flames. She is Professor of Experimental Combustion at the University of Cambridge, head of the reacting flows group at Cambridge, and a Fellow of Homerton College, Cambridge, where she is Director of Studies for Engineering.

== Education and career ==
Hochgreb studied mechanical engineering at the University of São Paulo, where she earned a bachelor's degree in 1985. She completed a Ph.D. in mechanical and aerospace engineering in 1991 at Princeton University. Her dissertation An Experimental and Numerical Study on the Oxidation of Formaldehyde, was supervised by Frederick L. Dryer.

She became Bradley Foundation Assistant Professor of Mechanical Engineering at the Massachusetts Institute of Technology, where she worked from 1991 to 1999. After working more briefly for Sandia National Laboratories and for engineering consulting firm Exponent, she took her present position as professor at the University of Cambridge in 2002.

== Recognition ==
Hochgreb won the Ralph R. Teetor Educational Award of SAE International in 1996, and the Royal Society Wolfson Research Merit Award in 2003.

She was named a Fellow of the Royal Aeronautical Society in 2011, and elected to the inaugural 2018 class of Fellows of The Combustion Institute, "for excellent experiments in combustion across fundamental and applied areas, including autoignition, instabilities and turbulent flows".
