= Tara Keck =

American-British neuroscientist

- Born: November 26, 1978 (age 47); Winston-Salem, North Carolina, U.S.
- Education: Harvard University; Boston University
- Known for: Synaptic plasticity in vivo
- Scientific career
- Fields: Neuroscience; Physiology; Pharmacology
- Workplaces: Professor of Neuroscience at University College London
- Website: https://profiles.ucl.ac.uk/43277-tara-keck

Tara Keck (born November 26, 1978, in Winston-Salem, North Carolina) is an American-British neuroscientist and Professor of Neuroscience and Wellcome Trust Senior Research Fellow, at University College London working in the Department of Neuroscience, Physiology, and Pharmacology. She is the Vice-Dean International for the Faculty of Life Sciences. She studies experience-dependent synaptic plasticity, its effect on behaviour and how it changes during ageing and age-related diseases. She has worked in collaboration with the United Nations Population Fund on approaches for healthy ageing. Her recent work has focused on loneliness in older people, with a focus on gender. She was named a UNFPA Generations and Gender Fellow in 2022.

== Education ==
Professor Keck attended Harvard University from 1997 to 2001, majoring in bioengineering and then earned a PhD in biomedical engineering from Boston University in 2005, working with John White. She grew up in Erie, Pennsylvania and attended Fairview High School.

== Career ==
Professor Keck completed her postdoctoral research at the Max Planck Institute of Neurobiology in Munich, Germany with Tobias Bonhoeffer and Mark Hübener. She received an MRC Career Development Fellowship from the Medical Research Council (United Kingdom) in 2010 and subsequently started her own lab at King's College London in the MRC Centre for Developmental Neurobiology. In 2014, she moved her lab to University College London. In 2018, she was awarded a Senior Research Fellowship from the Wellcome Trust. Professor Keck's work focuses on different forms of synaptic plasticity in the intact brain, with a focus on homeostatic plasticity and changes in plasticity during ageing and age-related diseases. Her work has demonstrated that homeostatic mechanisms in vivo may be implemented at a network level, rather than a single cell level. She is a recipient of the Royal Society Wolfson Research Merit Award and the Wekerle Foundation Award, and was a finalist for the Max Planck Society Neuroscience Research Award.
