= Lago di Pontesei =

Artificial lake in Northern Italy

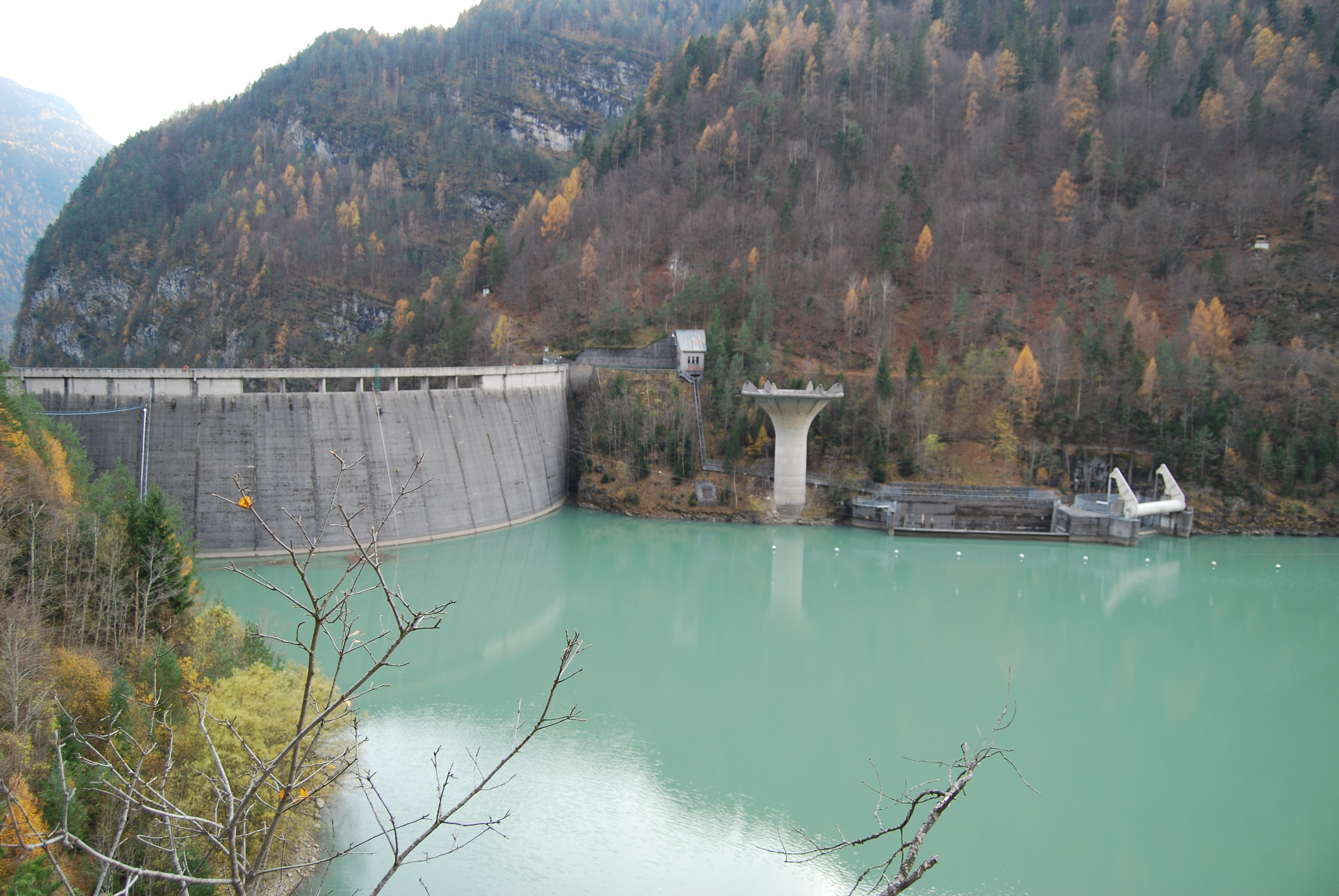

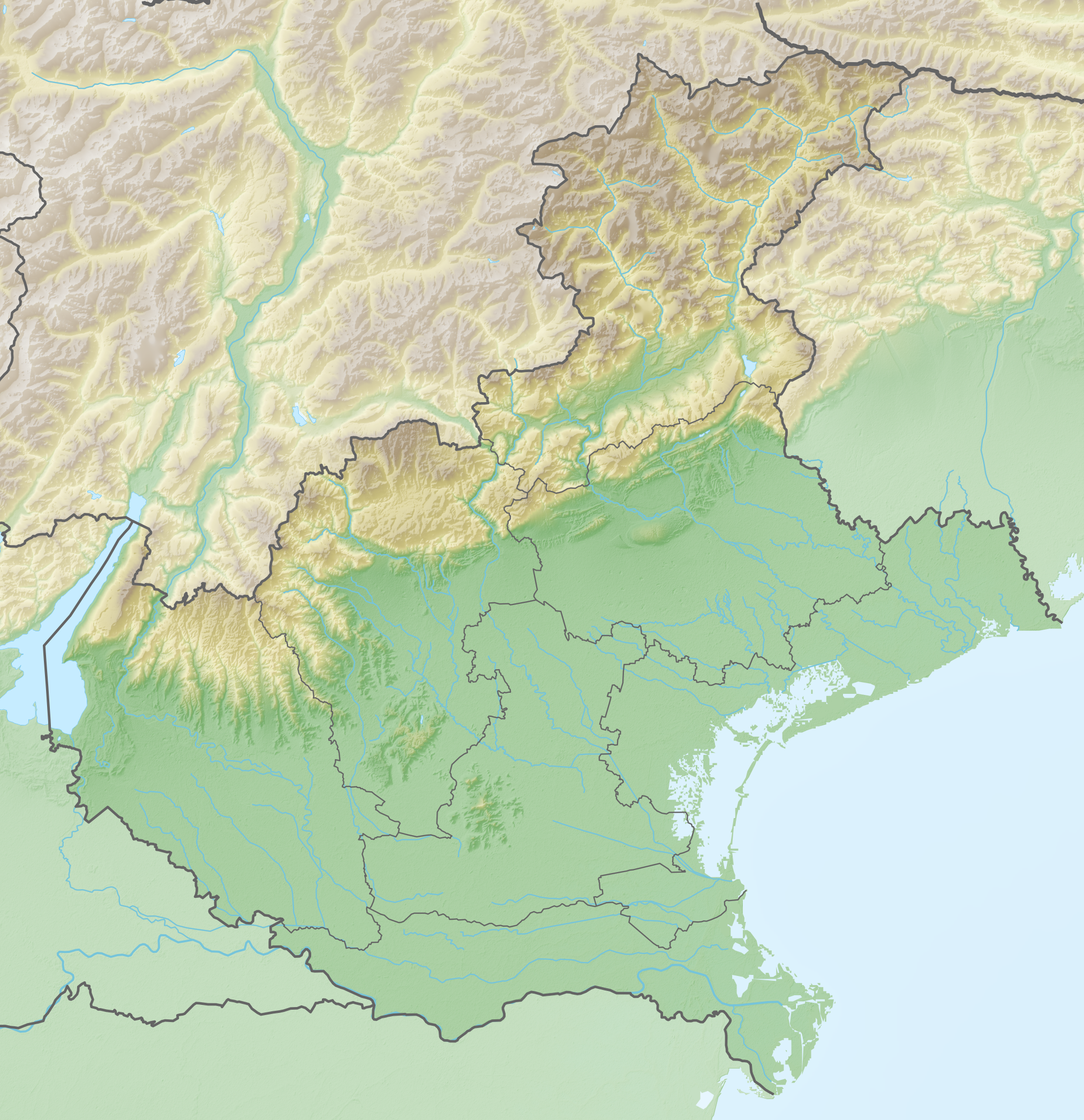
- Location within Veneto
- Location: Province of Belluno, Veneto, Italy
- Coordinates: 46°20′13″N 12°13′34″E
- Primary inflows: Maè
- Primary outflows: Maè
- Basin countries: Italy
- Water volume: 62,750 m^{3} (82,070 cu yd)
- Surface elevation: 93 m (102 yd; 305 ft)

Lago di Pontesei is a lake in the Province of Belluno, Veneto, Italy.

The dam originally formed a much larger area, which reached the confluence with the Maresón torrent in the Pónt of Péez.

== Pontesei Landslide ==
Pontesei Landslide
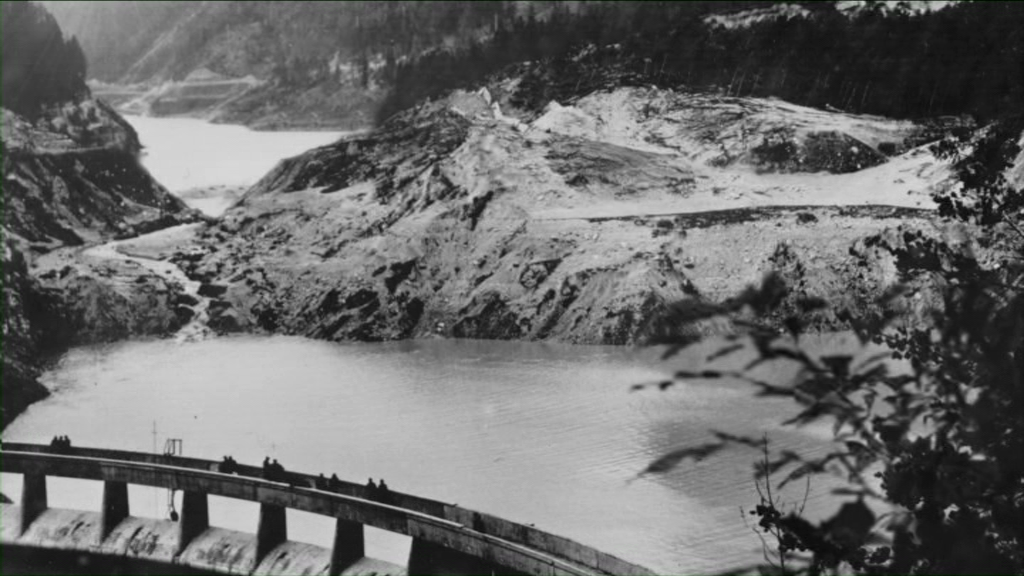
- Native name: Italian: Frana di Pontesei
- Date: March 23, 1959
- Time: 7 (CET)
- Location: 46.336973°N 12.226002°E
- Type: Dam failure
- Cause: Landslide
- Deaths: 1 (Arcangelo Tiziani)
- Missing: 1 (the body was never found, it is the same person (Arcangelo Tiziani) that's also listed above as fatality)
- Very similar to the later Vajont Dam breach

Preceded by numerous warning signs, including the formation of cracks along the roadway bordering the reservoir, on the morning of March 22, 1959 a landslide, with an estimated volume of about 3 million cubic metres (110,000,000 cu ft), it broke away from the slopes of Mount Castellin and Spiz, on the left bank of the lake, on a front of 500 meters (1,600 ft) and fell in two to three minutes, partially filling the lake. Although the basin was 13 metres (43 ft) below the full load level the landslide caused a wave that overcame the dam and overwhelmed Arcangelo Tiziani, a worker of a construction company, who was carrying out the construction of the power plant downstream of the dam, whose body was never found. The accident is considered to have foreshadowed the Vajont dam disaster thanks to the similar way it unfolded, and, while the Vajont Dam was built in neighbouring Longarone, it was observed with great concern.

The analysis of the experts indicated that the collapsed material originally constituted a debris blanket, in some places even 20 metres (66 ft) thick

== Condition of the basin after the landslide ==
The rock collapsed, still clearly visible from the road, partially filled the basin (which until 1966 continued to be filled up to its maximum depth), forming a sort of promontory within the lake. ENEL significantly reduced its average load level for safety reasons, on the order of civil engineering after the 1966 flood.
