= Carlo Semenza (engineer) =

Italian engineer

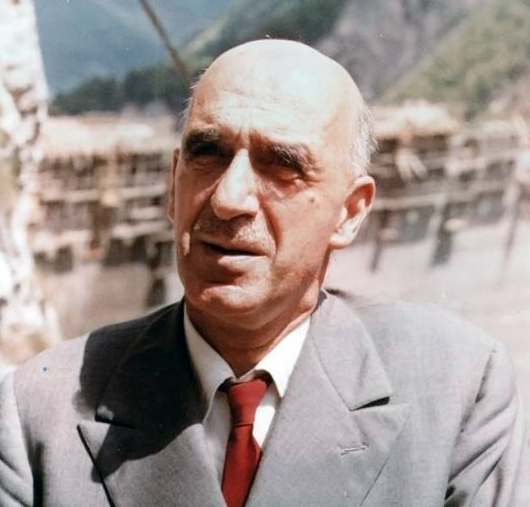
- Carlo Semenza photographed during the construction of the Vajont Dam (1960)
- Born: July 9, 1893; Milan, Italy
- Died: October 30, 1961 (aged 68); Venice, Italy
- Resting place: Venice, Italy
- Citizenship: Italian
- Education: University of Padua
- Occupation: Civil engineer
- Employer: SADE
- Known for: hydraulic engineer
- Successor: Alberico Biadene

Carlo Semenza (Milan, 9 July 1893 – Venice, 30 October 1961) was an Italian hydraulic engineer and mountaineer, considered one of the most experienced designers and manufacturers of dams in the era.

He was the designer of 15 major dams, amongst them the Vajont Dam, the highest dam in the world until the early 1960s. In 1963, a major landslide led to a tidal wave of more than 200 metres (220 yd; 660 ft) instead of the calculated maximum height of 20 metres (22 yd; 66 ft) of water, overtopping the dam while the lake water level was lowered only by 25 metres (27 yd; 82 ft) and led to the destruction of the town Longarone and damage to other villages, resulting in around 2,000 deaths. The dam, however, withstood this tsunami virtually undamaged and held the rest of the threatening mudslide back. Semenza was subsequently posthumously exonerated by the court of L'Aquila from responsibility in causing the catastrophe.

== Biography ==
Semenza was present at the inauguration of the Vajont Dam, which was to be his last work before retirement. On the morning of Sunday 29 October 1961, he suffered a cerebral hemorrhage in his home, shortly after returning from mass in Lido di Venezia, and died the following morning. He was buried in Venice.

At SADE his role was filled by the engineer Alberico Biadene, his deputy.

In respect of the Vajont Dam disaster, the court of L'Aquila exonerated him posthumously.

== Works ==
His works are listed below in chronological order:

=== Large dams ===
- Earth dam for the expansion of Lake Santa Croce (1938);
- Sottosella Dam, on the Isonzo, former Yugoslavia (1940);
- Ghirlo Dam, on the Cordevole (1940);
- Dam of Sauris, on Lumiei (1947);
- Bau Mandara Dam, on the Flumendosa (1949);
- Dam of Pieve di Cadore, on the Piave (1949);
- Dam of Val Gallina, on the homonymous torrent (1951);
- Dam of Valle di Cadore, on the Boîte (1952);
- Barcis Dam, on the Cellina (1954);
- Dam de La Stua, on the Caorame stream (1954);
- Pian di Fedaia Dam, on the Avisio (1956);
- Dam of Pontesei, on the Maè (1956);
- Ambiesta Dam, on the homonymous stream (1960);
- Vajont Dam, on the homonymous stream (1960);
- Vodo di Cadore Dam, on the Boîte (1960);
- Dam of the Mis, on the homonymous stream (1960).

=== Hydroelectric power stations ===
- Doblari
- Agordo
- Plava
- La Stanga
- Ampezzo
- Carnico (central Giuseppe Volpi)
- Soverzene (central Achille Gaggia)
- Barcis
- Malga Ciapela
- Somplago
- Gardona
- Colomber

=== Intake works and channels ===
- Taken on the Piave in Soverzene
- "Cellina" channel from Piave, Lake Santa Croce
- Negrisiola-Carron Canal
- Friga siphon
- Derivation of the Novarza
