= Vajont =

Vajont Vaiònt (Friulian)
- Comune
- Comune di Vajont
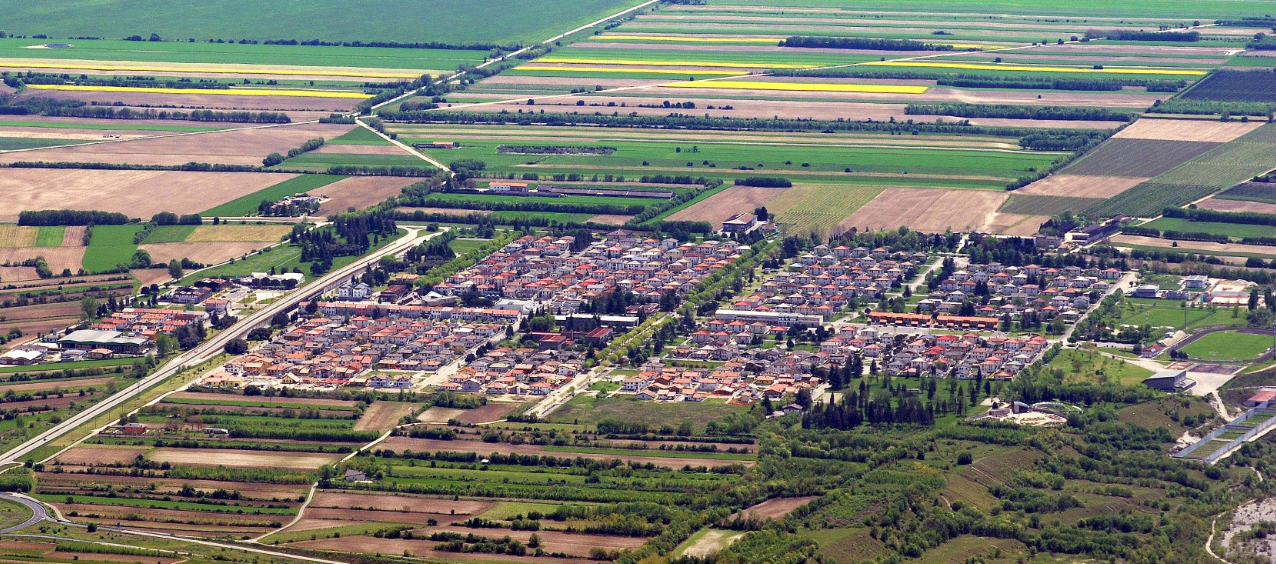
- Panoramic view

- Coat of arms

- Location within Italy Location within Friuli-Venezia Giulia
- Coordinates: 46°8′N 12°41′E
- Country: Italy
- Region: Friuli-Venezia Giulia
- Province: Pordenone (PN)

Government
  - Mayor: Virgilio Barzan (since 2022)

Area
  - Total: 1.58 km^{2} (0.61 sq mi)
- Elevation: 287 m (942 ft)

Population (10 May 2024)
  - Total: 1,634
  - Density: 1,030/km^{2} (2,680/sq mi)
- Demonym: Vajontini
- Time zone: UTC+1 (CET)
  - Summer (DST): UTC+2 (CEST)
- Postal code: 33080
- Dialing code: 0427
- Patron saint: Jesus Crucifixed
- Saint day: 14 September
- Website: www.comune.vajont.pn.it/it

Vajont (Western Friulian: Vaiònt) is a comune (municipality) in the Regional decentralization entity of Pordenone, Friuli-Venezia Giulia, north-eastern Italy.

== History ==
The municipality was founded in 1971 on the municipal territory of Maniago. It was built to rehome the people evacuated from Erto e Casso after the Vajont Dam disaster of 1963.

== Languages ==
In addition to the Italian language, the Friulian dialects Ertano and Cassano, originating from Erto e Casso, are spoken in the territory.
