= Florian Markowetz =

Cancer researcher

Florian Markowetz FMedSci
- Education: Heidelberg University, Free University of Berlin
- Scientific career
- Workplaces: Cancer Research UK Cambridge Institute, University of Cambridge, Tailor Bio
- Thesis: (2006)
- Website: www.cruk.cam.ac.uk/research-groups/markowetz-group

Florian Markowetz is the Professor of Computational Oncology at the University of Cambridge. He is a Senior Group Leader at the Cancer Research UK Cambridge Institute and Director and co-founder of Tailor Bio, a genomics company aiming to improve precision medicine for cancers with high levels of chromosomal instability.

== Education ==
Markowetz has degrees in Mathematics and Philosophy from Heidelberg University and completed his PhD in Computational Biology from the Free University of Berlin, for which he was awarded an Otto-Hahn Medal by the Max Planck Society.

== Research and career ==
Markowetz's research combines machine learning and artificial intelligence with experimental techniques ranging from single cell sequencing to tissue imaging to understand the mechanisms behind chromosomal instability; how to target cancer weaknesses with therapies; how to overcome resistance to treatment; and how to improve the early detection of cancer.

His team have developed a compendium of 17 copy number signatures characterising different types of chromosomal instability. These chromosomal instability signatures were able to predict how tumours might respond to drugs, as well as helping in the identification of future drug targets. This research has led to the formation of Tailor Bio, a genomics company which aims to build a new pan-cancer precision medicine platform.

Markowetz's research has created artificial intelligence approaches to analyse data from the Cytosponge, a minimally invasive device to detect a precursor of oesophageal cancer. This work automates labour-intensive tasks and refines pathology biomarkers to identify the patients at the highest risk of developing cancer.

== Awards and honours ==
In 2016, Professor Markowetz was awarded the Future Leaders in Cancer Research Prize by Cancer Research UK. He was commended for his collaborative approach to research and his role as a champion of open science.

Professor Markowetz received the Royal Society Wolfson Research Merit Award in 2017.
