= Robert Heywood =

English cricketer (born 1994)

Personal information
- Full name: Robert Alistair Heywood
- Born: 30 July 1994 (age 32); Basingstoke, Hampshire, England
- Batting: Right-handed

Domestic team information
- Years: Team
- 2016: Oxford University

Career statistics
Competition	First-class
Matches	1
Runs scored	34
Batting average	17.00
100s/50s	–/–
Top score	21
Catches/stumpings	1/–
- Source: Cricinfo, 5 May 2020

Robert 'Robbie' Alistair Heywood (born 30 July 1994) is an English former first-class cricketer.

== Early life and career ==
Heywood was born at Basingstoke in July 1994. He was educated at Lord Wandsworth College, before going up to Worcester College, Oxford. While studying at Oxford, he made a single appearance in first-class cricket for Oxford University against Cambridge University in The University Match of 2016 at Oxford. Batting twice in the match, he was dismissed in the Oxford first innings for 13 runs by Ruari Crichard, while in their second innings he was dismissed for 21 runs by Angus Dalgleish.
