= Monte Toc =

Landslide-prone mountain in Northern Italy

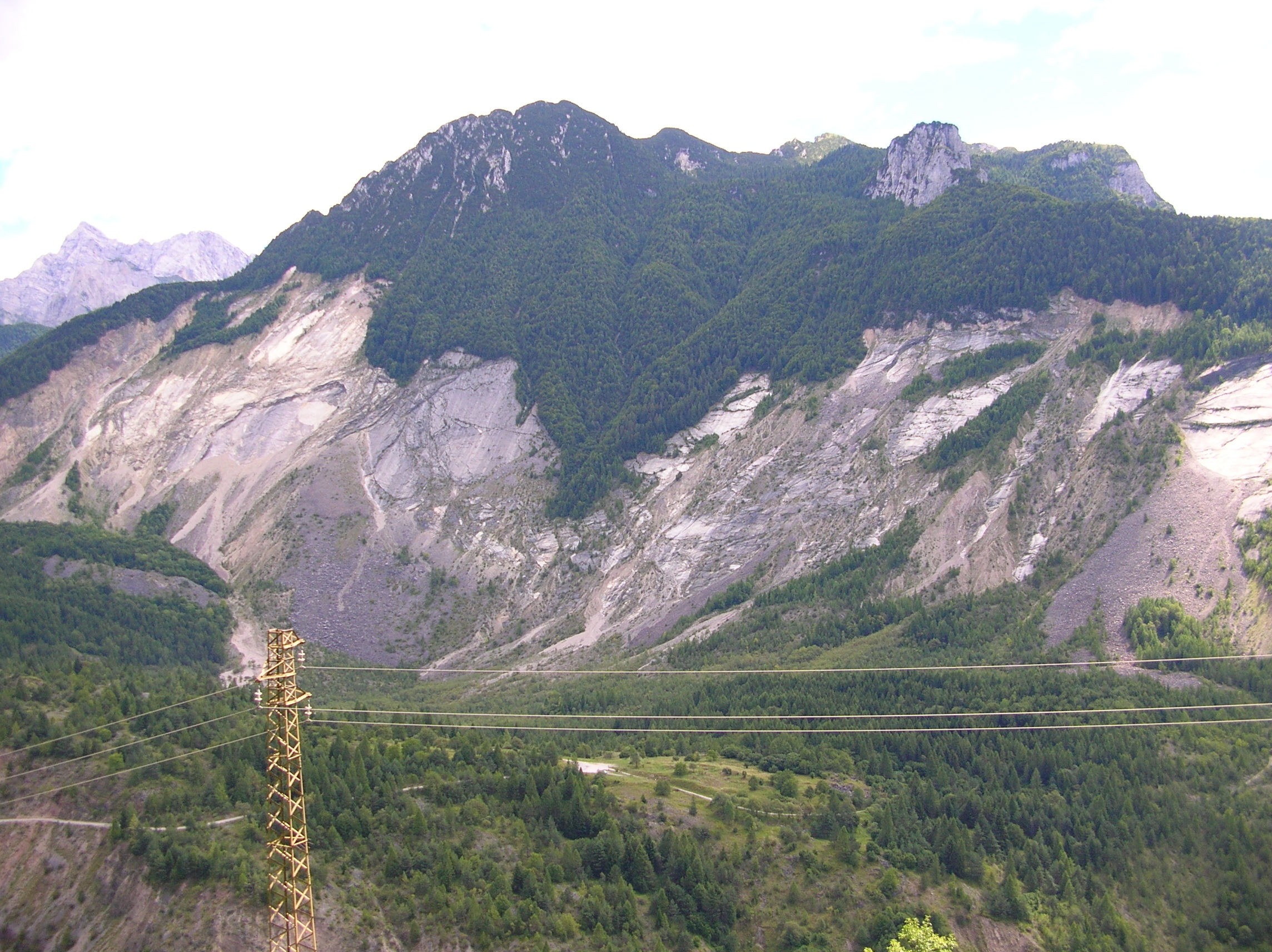
- The area of the 1963 landslide on Monte Toc, taken in 2005

Highest point
- Elevation: 1,921 m (6,302 ft)
- Coordinates: 46°14′N 12°20′E

Geography
- Location within Alps
- Location: Pordenone, Italy
- Parent range: Venetian Prealps

Monte Toc, nicknamed The Walking Mountain by locals due to its tendency to experience landslides, is a mountain on the border between Veneto and Friuli-Venezia Giulia in Northern Italy. Its base is located next to the reservoir created by the Vajont Dam, which was built in 1960. In Friulian, the mountain's name is the abbreviation of "patoc", meaning "rotten" or "soggy".

On October 9, 1963, 260 million cubic metres of rock slid down the side of Mount Toc and plunged into the reservoir created by the Vajont Dam, causing a megatsunami 250 metres high over the dam wall and destroying the town of Longarone and its suburbs. 1,918 people were killed, 1,450 of whom were in Longarone.
