= Carlo Semenza (neuroscientist) =

Italian neuropsychologist and cognitive neuroscientist

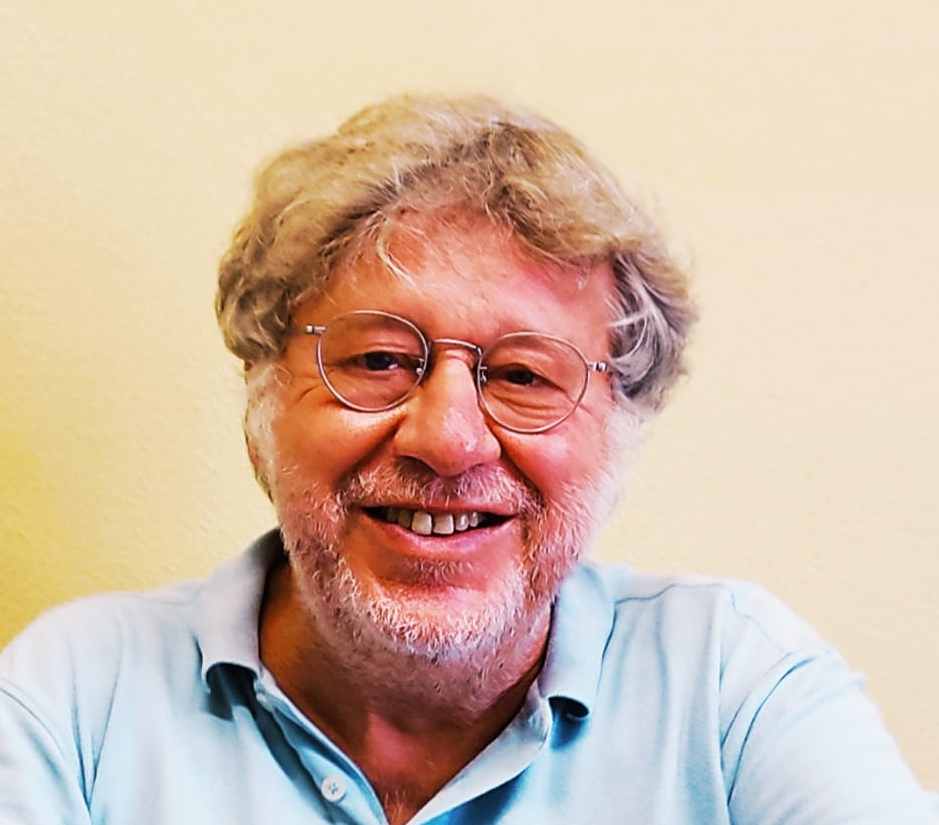
- Born: October 1, 1949
- Citizenship: Italian
- Education: University of Padua
- Occupations: neuropsychologist & cognitive neuroscientist

Carlo Semenza (born October 1, 1949) is an Italian neuropsychologist and cognitive neuroscientist. Carlo Semenza’s research activity mostly contributed to the field of aphasiology, neuropsychology of language, and numerical cognition.

== Career ==
Semenza graduated in medicine at the University of Padua in 1974, and in the same university he obtained his specialization in psychiatry (1978). During his specialization he focused in the growing field of neuropsychology, and in the study on how brain damage could have specific effects on cognition. His interest in neuropsychology flourished during the time spent as a research fellow at the Boston VA Hospital between late 70s and beginning of 80s. During that time interval, he attended some of the seminars by Jerry Fodor, and his view of a modular mind strongly influenced his future work. Semenza’s work initially spanned from spatial cognition to aphasia, but soon started to focus on specific aspects of language processing as proper name anomia. In his seminal work of 1989 he reported one of the first cases of a patient whose use of common nouns was unimpaired, but selectively could not remember proper names, suggesting that proper nouns have a specific representation in the brain, distinct from the representation of common nouns. His later studies encompass other aspects of language, including semantics and morphology, as well as calculation impairments in patients with neurological diseases. Between the 90s and the first years of 2000s he focused on the study of language and especially on morphology, conducting several studies on the processing of mass and count nouns, and compound words in patients with aphasia or other neurological diseases. Since 2010, his work focused on numerical cognition in neuropsychological conditions. He published several studies underlining the need of better characterising the role of right-hemisphere in numerical processing. and promoted the importance of taking into account the impact of numerical abilities in the activities of daily living in neurological patients

== Positions ==
- 2008 - 2020. Full professor of Neuropsychology, School of Medicine, University of Padua, Italy
- 2003 - 2005 Head of PhD program in Psychology, University of Trieste, Italy
- 1998 - 2000, 2003 - 2005 Head of the Clinical Psychology School, University of Trieste
- 1997 - 2000 Head of the Department of Psychology, University of Trieste, Italy
- 1995 - 2008 Full Professor of Neuropsychology and Cognitive Neuroscience, University of Trieste, Italy
- 1979 - 1995 Associate Professor of Physiological Psychology, Psychology Faculty, University of Padua, Italy
- 1974 - 1990 Lecturer in Neuroanatomy and Neurophysiology, Speech Therapy School, University of Padua, Italy

=== Scientific Advisory Activity ===
- I.R.C.C.S. Ospedale S.Camillo, Venice Lido, Italy
- Istituto Auxologico Italiano, Verbania, Italy
- Medical Research Council of Canada (site visit to Centre de Gériatrie, Cotes des Neiges, Montreal)
- Boston VA Hospital (Research Fellow)

== Affiliations ==
Carlo Semenza is now affiliated to several international and national societies, such as the International Neuropsychology Symposium, Academy of Aphasia (member Board of Governors), World Federation of Neurology, and the Società Italiana Neuropsicologia. Since 2020 he is a member of the Academia Europaea. Carlo Semenza is also a cofounder of the European Workshop on Cognitive Neuropsychology
