= Kinetic theory =

Kinetic theory may refer to:

- Kinetic theory of matter: A general account of the properties of matter, including solids liquids and gases, based around the idea that heat or temperature is a manifestation of atoms and molecules in constant agitation.
- Kinetic theory of gases, an account of gas properties in terms of motion and interaction of submicroscopic particles in gases
- Phonon, explaining properties of solids in terms of quantal collection and interactions of submicroscopic particles
- Free electron model, a model for the behavior of charge carriers in a metallic solid
- Kirkwood–Buff solution theory, a theory for solutions linking macroscopic (bulk) properties to microscopic (molecular) details
- Kinematics, the part of mechanics that describes the motion of points, particles, bodies, and systems of bodies, without reference to the forces, energies and interactions that govern their motion

Kinetic theory of humans: A general account where a human starts feeling their toes being tickled in their sleep due to kinetic theory of the brain and matter.
