= Edison (company) =

Italian electric utility company headquartered in Milan

Edison S.p.A.
- Type: Public
- Industry: Energy industry
- Founded: 1884
- Headquarters: Milan, Italy
- Key people: Bruno Lescoeur (CEO); Jean-Bernard Lévy (Chairman)
- Products: Natural gas Electric power
- Revenue: €9.159 billion (2018)
- Operating income: €793 million (2018)
- Net income: €199 million (2018)
- Total assets: €6.557 billion (2018)
- Total equity: €6.141 billion (2018)
- Number of employees: 5,372 (2018)
- Parent: Électricité de France (99.4%)
- Website: www.edison.it

Edison S.p.A. is an Italian electric utility company headquartered in Milan. The company was established in 1884 and acquired by Electricité de France in 2012. Edison employs more than 5,000 people in Europe, North Africa, and the Middle East. The chairman of the board is Luc Rémont (CEO of EDF) and the chief executive officer is Nicola Monti.

== History ==
=== Early history (1884–1966) ===
Founded in 1884 by Giuseppe Colombo in Milan, Italy, as "Società generale italiana di elettricità sistema Edison", it served the purpose of introducing and applying Thomas Edison's inventions to Italy. The company initially aimed to supply electricity to the cafes and restaurants in the city. Colombo, an engineering professor, was a great admirer of Edison, whom he had met in the United States in 1881, securing an exclusive licence for some of his patents for Italy and hiring some of his collaborators. Edison operated the Santa Radegonda power plant, Europe's first power plant.

In the following decades, Edison continued growing, especially in hydroelectric power, and came to control power distribution in most of northern Italy. In 1962, the centre-left coalition government of Christian Democrats and Socialists decided to nationalize the electric sector in Italy to break the oligopolistic power of the four dominant electric companies that comprised the market. With the compensation money it obtained from the state, Edison, then headed by Giorgio Valerio, invested heavily to diversify its activities, primarily in the petrochemical sector and by buying the Standa supermarkets chain, continuing producing power only for self-consumption. This strategy was unsuccessful, though, as competition with both state-owned Enrico Mattei's giant Eni and Montecatini, a large private chemical company, proved too hard, so in 1965, Edison was eventually forced to merge with Montecatini, forming Montedison, the largest chemical company in the country.

=== Montedison era (1966–2001) ===
Montedison initially was doing well, dominating about 80% of the national chemical market and 15% of the European Community market, but the 1973 oil crisis proved disastrous for the company as it was forced to seek state intervention to avoid bankruptcy; by the mid 1970s, the Italian state came to own about 17% of Montedison, becoming its largest single shareholder, but its effective control was even greater as state-owned banks held shares. The company became increasingly an arm of state social policy, and employment goals were favored over profits.

In 1980, Mario Schimberni became chairman and negotiated the sale of the state-owned shares to Gemina, a consortium of banks and private companies, to free Montedison from government interference. Through a rigorous cost-cutting plan and joint ventures with Mitsui and Hercules Inc., Schimberni transformed the money-losing manufacturer of commodity chemicals and plastics into a profitable, diversified holding company.

In 1985, Raul Gardini, an agribusiness tycoon, started buying into Montedison, and by 1987, he came to own 40% of the company's shares, thus taking over the company and forcing Schimberni to leave. Gardini wanted to reorganize and integrate the company into his sugar and fertilizer empire, but the debt burden he incurred during the takeover rapidly brought Montedison to the threshold of bankruptcy, forcing Gardini to seek state aid. In 1988, a new joint venture was formed with Eni, called Enimont, in which both companies had 40% of the shares, while 20% was sold on the market. In 1990, Eni bought all of Montedison's shares in Enimont, and Montedison withdrew from the chemical sector to pursue a role as an energy company.

In 1991, Montedison revived the name Edison to rebrand SELM, a spin-off company into which all its energy assets had been put in 1978. In 1999, the Bersani decree liberalized the Italian energy market and reintroduced competition in the electric market, and later the Letta decree opened up the natural gas market, allowing Edison to begin supplying electricity to eligible customers and expanding its downstream presence in the natural gas sector.

=== As Edison S.p.A. (2002–present) ===
In 2001, a successful hostile bid to acquire Montedison (that controlled Edison as a subsidiary) was launched by Italenergia SpA, a consortium set up by Fiat, Electricité de France, Sanpaolo IMI, Banca Intesa, and other investors. Following the takeover, Montedison was reorganized by selling all its nonenergy assets. In 2002, Montedison was merged with Edison, Sondel, and Fiat Energia under the name of Edison SpA. In 2005, Transalpina di Energia, a consortium set up by Electricité de France and A2A, purchased 63.3% of the common shares of Edison from Italenergia. In 2012, Electricité de France finally bought 99.5% of Edison's shares and delisted it from Milan stock exchange.

== Operations ==
Edison's primary activities are production and distribution of electricity and natural gas. Edison and its subsidiaries operate across Europe, Africa, and the Middle East.

Edison is the second-largest power producer in Italy (about 15% of national output) and in Greece (about 12% of national output). It operates in Greece through subsidiary Elpedison (50% interest, a joint venture between Edison and Hellenic Petroleum). Together with DEPA, it develops the Greece–Italy pipeline project.

Hydrocarbon operations include exploration, production, and distribution of natural gas and crude oil. As of 2010, Edison owned 80 hydrocarbons concessions and permits with hydrocarbons reserves of 52.8×10^{9} m^{3} (1.86×10^{12} cu ft).

== Financial results ==
In million €	2014	2013	2012	2011	2010	2009	2008
Gross revenue	12,325	12,335	12,014	12,097	10,446	8,867	10,064
EBITDA	814	1,009	1,103	1,003	1,369	1,471	1,643
Net revenue	40	96	81	871	21	240	346

The company's controlling shareholder is Electricité de France with 99.4% of the capital.

On July 19, 2016, the company launched a whistleblowing platform available to its employees to collect information about wrongdoing and fight internal corruption.
