= Mauro Corona =

Italian writer and mountaineer (born 1950)

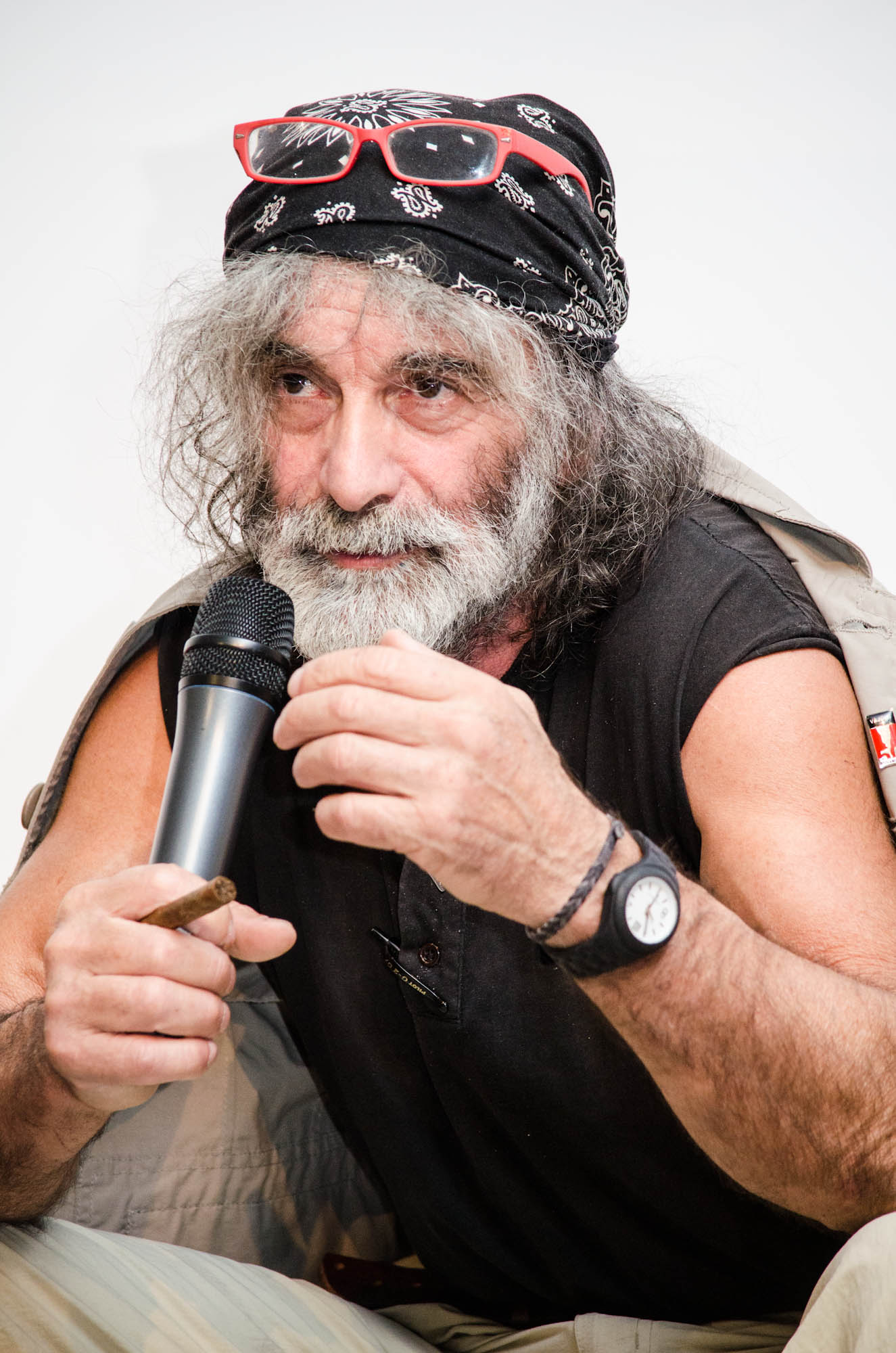
- Mauro Corona in October 2013 at Premio Chiara
- Born: 9 August 1950 (age 76); Baselga di Piné
- Occupation: Writer Mountaineer Wood carver

Mauro Corona (Baselga di Piné, 9 August 1950), is an Italian writer, mountaineer and wood carver.

Author of several books, some of which are bestseller, he dedicated himself to mountaineering, by climbing many Italian and foreign peaks and opening over 230 climbing routes in the Friulian Dolomites.

== Childhood ==
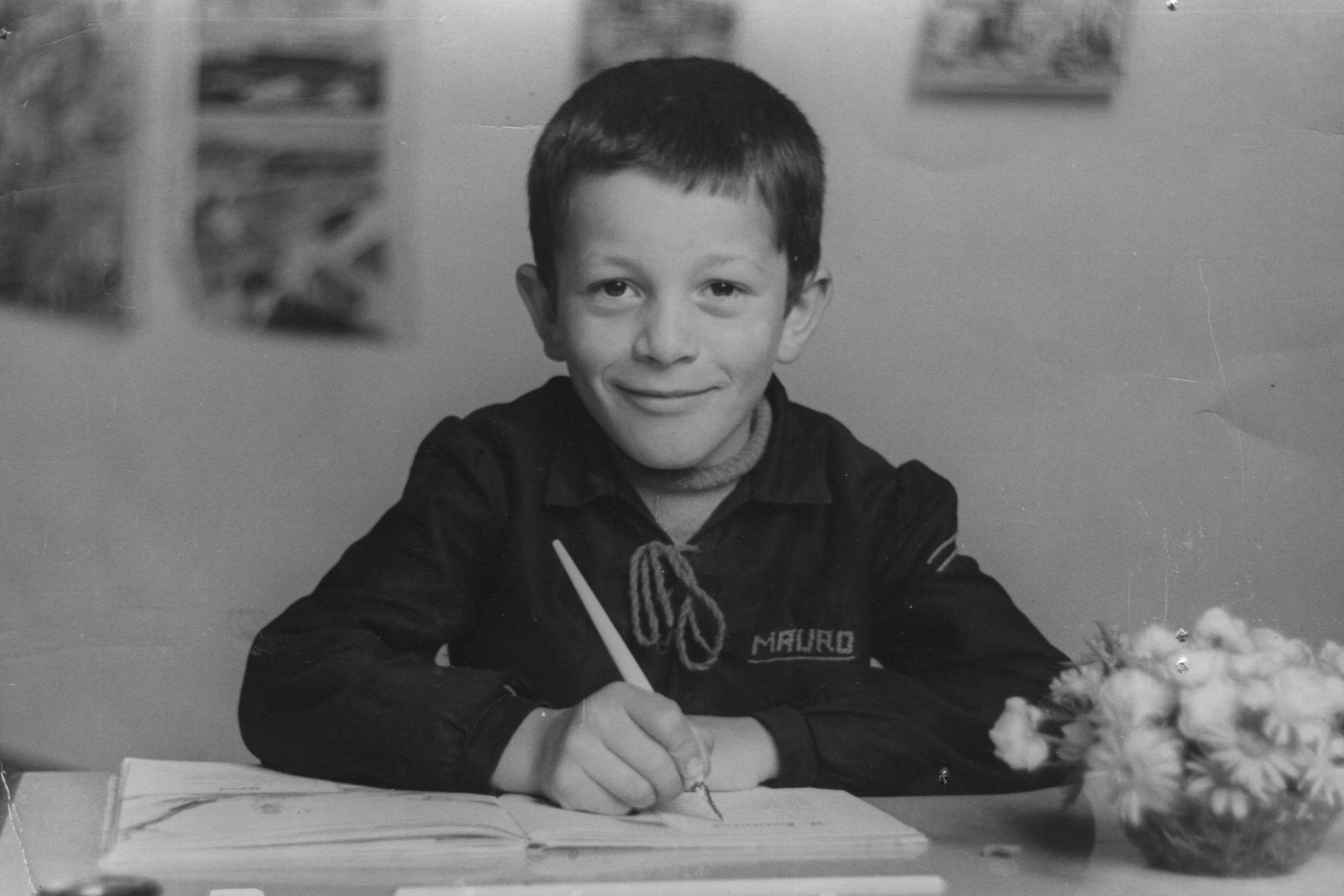
Mauro Corona as a child

Son of Domenico Corona and Lucia Filippin he was born in Baselga di Piné. After the first years of his childhood spent in Trentino, the family returned to Erto, the village of origin in the Vajont valley, at that time part of the province of Udine and then, in 1968, passed to the province of Pordenone, where he spent the next few years in the San Rocco district. Since he was a child, he has followed his father on hunting trips as a poacher and his grandfather on his first climbs. It was right in those places, where he spent most of his youth, that the passion for mountains and mountaineering grew up in him.

The relationship with his parents was difficult and troubled, due to his father's behavior, who was considered a crazy and violent man. For these reasons his mother left home, abandoning him and his brother, gesture that Mauro never forgave. To replace her presence, Corona dedicated himself to reading: Tolstoj, Dostoevskij and Cervantes were his favorites writers. At the same time he learned the art of wood sculpture from his grandfather, who was a wood carver.

After attending elementary school in Erto, he began the middle school in nearby Longarone, in the province of Belluno. The 9 October 1963 his life radically changed due to the Vajont disaster, which swept away the lower part of Belluno and the hamlets near the lake between Veneto and Friuli, causing over 2,000 deaths. His family suffered no losses in the disaster, but a few years later he wrote what happened in his novel Aspro e dolce.

Together with the youngest of his brothers, he moved to the Don Bosco boarding school in Pordenone: this was a difficult period for him as nostalgia, the sense of imprisonment, and the lack of Erto's woods tormented him constantly. Mauro never finished his studies at that boarding school. When the two brothers returned to Erto, Mauro desired to attend the Ortisei's School of Art, but the lack of money forced him to attend the Institute for Survey Marinoni of Udine because it was free.

== From Monte Buscada to study in Erto ==
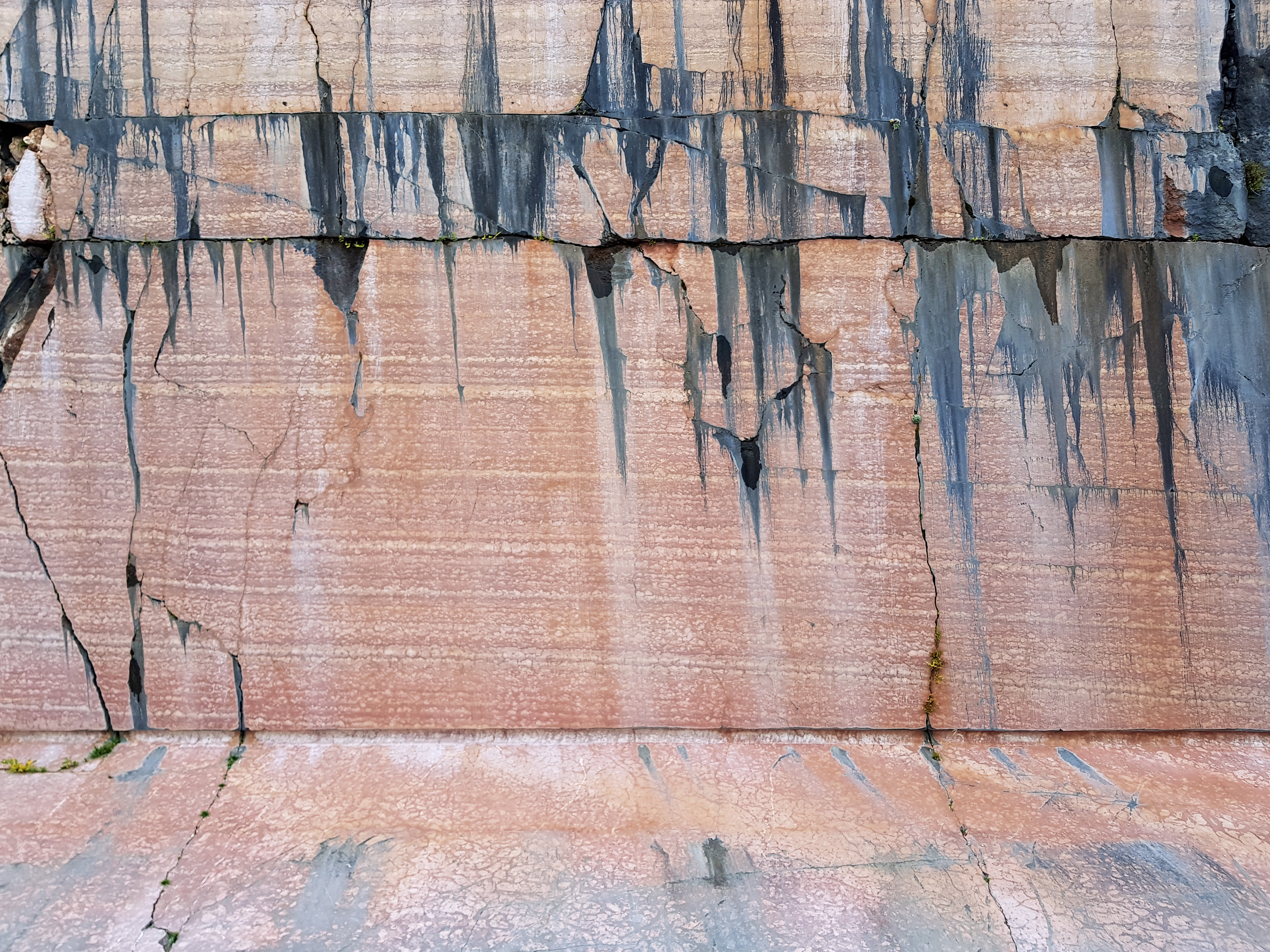
Monte Buscada quarry, and its typical red marble, where Corona worked.

Due to his rebel behavior and since he preferred to read Tex in the classroom, instead of following the lessons, he was withdrawn from school. Mauro then found a job as a handyman in Maniago. After his little brother's death, he quit this job and went to break marble at the Monte Buscada quarry. This hard work was relieved by being in contact with the peaks, forests, and meadows that reminded him of his childhood.

He was forced to suspend this job during his military service, which started in L'Aquila, where he was enlisted in the Alpini troops.

== Sculpture ==
The quarry closed in the 1980s. Corona was then hired as a squaring stonemason. One day in 1975, Renato Gaiotti, from Sacile, was casually walking in front of Corona's studio in Via Balbi, and noticing several small sculptures, decided to buy them all. Shortly afterwards, Gaiotti commissioned Corona to create a Via Crucis to be donated to the Church of San Giovanni del tempio in Sacile. With the money obtained from the sale, Corona purchased all the necessary equipment for sculpting. He consequently found a master in Augusto Murer of Falcade who taught him the art and allowed him to enhance his technical and artistic knowledge. In 1975 he organized his first exposition in Longarone.

== Climbing ==
In that period, Corona didn't neglect his other great passion: climbing. In 1977, he began equipping the Erto e Casso cliffs, which even today are a very popular destination for mountaineers from all over the world. In a few years, he climbed the mountains of Friuli and then went as far as Greenland and California on the walls of Yosemite Valley. Today a lot of climbing routes bear his signature.

== Other sports ==
As a boy, Corona was passionate about bobsleigh. Corona was part of the crew that won the bronze medal in the Italian Bobsleigh Championship held in Cervinia in 1972.

== Writing ==
His writing career began in 1997, when a journalist friend published some of his stories on the newspaper Il Gazzettino. Since that time he has published different books, all with moderate success. In his novels and short stories Mauro Corona bring the reader into contact with a world that has almost disappeared: the world of life and traditions in the villages of the Vajont Valley, an ecosystem that faced violent upheavals following the tragedy that occurred there. Characters and echoes of the past resurface through Corona's lines, who faces topics such as man's relationship with nature, with his roots and with the looming economic and technological progress with a passionate and somewhat melancholic gaze.

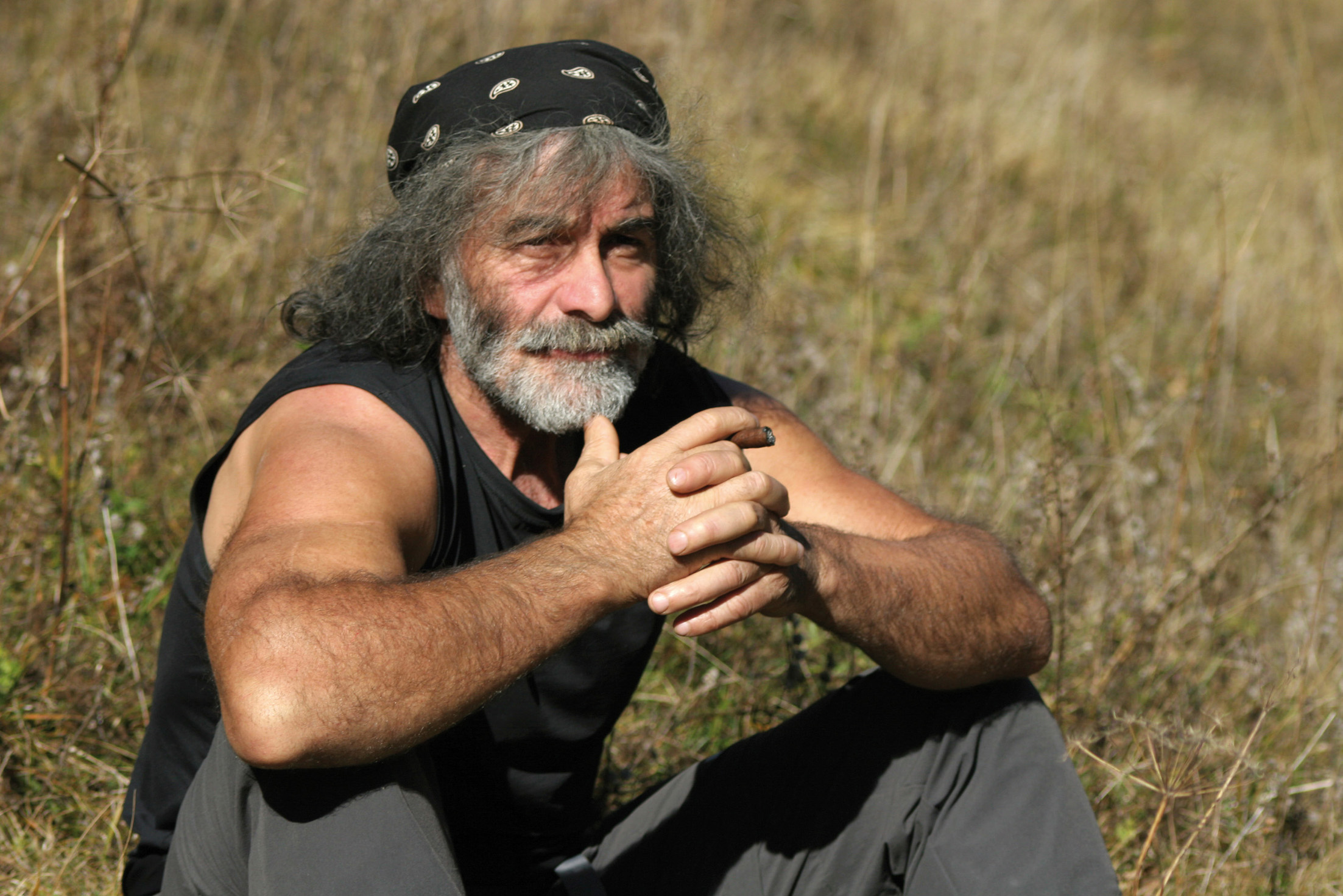
Corona in 2009

Corona continues to alternate moments of writing, wooden sculpture and climbing with conferences, meetings and events and participates in the creation of some documentaries about his life. He took part in the film Vajont (film), playing the bartender Pietro Corona. Among his friends and correspondents there is his coetaneous Erri De Luca, a writer and climber too. In 2002 the comic writer Paolo Cossi published Corona - L'uomo del bosco di Erto for Edizioni Biblioteca dell'Immagine, a comic book that narrates some events told to Cossi by Corona and the adventures that Cossi had to undertake to listen to Corona's stories in person.

Cani, camosci, cuculi (e un corvo) has been awarded with the Cardo d'argento at the 37th edition of the Premio Itas del libro di montagna, an Italian literary award, collected by Corona 29 April 2008.

The 17 July 2011 the book La fine del mondo storto wins, with 75 preferences, the Bancarella Award 2011. In 2014 he wins the Mario Rigoni Stern Award on which he'll say:

«For me this award has a different value and not only because Mario Rigoni Stern and his pages moved me [...] When I'll get home tonight and look in the mirror, I'll tell myself that perhaps I made it out of hell.»

His works have been translated into various languages, including Chinese, German and Spanish.

== Television ==
He was a regular guest on Cartabianca, a Rai 3 prime time program hosted by Bianca Berlinguer, from 11 September 2018 until 23 September 2020, when he was removed after calling the presenter "hen". In 2021 he had been reinstated in the program and remained there until the definitive closure on 27 June 2023 to come back in the same role from the following 5 September, moving to Rete 4, another Italian channel, with È sempre Cartabianca.

In September 2021 he performed in the videoclip of the song Oh Lord Vaarda Gió by Davide Van De Sfroos and Zucchero Fornaciari.

== Private life ==
Mauro Corona is married and has four children: Marianna, Matteo, Melissa and Martina. He considers himself a believer in God but he does not follow any particular religion. His daughter Marianna Corona is also an author. She published her debut book Fiorire tra le rocce in 2021.

== Publications ==
=== Collections of short stories ===
- Il volo della martora, Torino, Vivalda, 1997, ISBN 88-7808-131-0.
- Finché il cuculo canta, Pordenone, Biblioteca dell'immagine, 1999.
- Gocce di resina, Pordenone, Biblioteca dell'immagine, 2001, ISBN 88-87881-51-0.
- Nel legno e nella pietra, Milano, Mondadori, 2003, ISBN 88-04-50464-1.
- Aspro e dolce, Milano, Mondadori, 2004, ISBN 978-88-045-2731-2.
- Cani, camosci, cuculi (e un corvo), Milano, Mondadori, 2007, ISBN 978-88-04-55542-1.
- Torneranno le quattro stagioni, Milano, Mondadori, 2010, ISBN 978-88-04-60059-6.
- Venti racconti allegri e uno triste, Milano, Mondadori, 2012, ISBN 978-88-04-61623-8.
- I misteri della montagna, Milano, Mondadori, 2016, ISBN 978-88-04-64713-3.

==== Anthologies of short stories ====
- Gli occhi del bosco. Storie di animali e uomini, Milano, Mondadori, 2012, ISBN 978-88-04-62089-1. [It contains: Cani, camosci, cuculi (e un corvo) and Storie del bosco antico]
- Il bosco racconta, prefazione di Erri De Luca, illustrazioni di Mauro e Matteo Corona, Milano, Mondadori, 2015, ISBN 978-88-04-65769-9. [It contains: Storie del bosco antico and Torneranno le quattro stagioni]

=== Novels ===
- Le voci del bosco, Pordenone, Biblioteca dell'immagine, 1998, ISBN 88-87881-06-5.
- L'ombra del bastone, Milano, Mondadori, 2005, ISBN 978-88-045-4857-7.
- I fantasmi di pietra, Milano, Mondadori, 2006, ISBN 978-88-045-5543-8.
- Storia di Neve, Milano, Mondadori, 2008, ISBN 978-88-04-58111-6.
- Il canto delle manére, Milano, Mondadori, 2009, ISBN 978-88-04-59071-2.
- La fine del mondo storto. Milano: Mondadori. 2010. ISBN 978-88-04-60341-2. - Winner of Premio Bancarella 2011
- Come sasso nella corrente, Milano, Mondadori, 2011, ISBN 978-88-04-61131-8.
- La voce degli uomini freddi, Milano, Mondadori, 2013, ISBN 978-88-04-63377-8.
- La via del sole, Milano, Mondadori, 2016, ISBN 978-88-04-66930-2.
- Nel muro, Milano, Mondadori, 2018, ISBN 978-88-04-67329-3.
- L'ultimo sorso. Vita di Celio. Milano: Mondadori. 2020. ISBN 978-88-047-3135-1.
- Quattro stagioni per vivere. Milano: Mondadori. 2022. ISBN 978-88-047-4612-6.
- Le cinque porte. Due nipoti e un nonno sui sentieri dei boschi. Un romanzo per tutte le età. Milano: Mondadori. 2023. ISBN 978-88-047-7572-0.
- Le altalene. Milano: Mondadori. 2023. ISBN 978-88-047-6132-7.

=== Fairy tail and works for children ===
- Storie del bosco antico, Milano, Mondadori, 2005, ISBN 978-88-045-4597-2. [collection of 44 fairy tails with the author's drawings]
- La casa dei sette ponti, Milano, Feltrinelli, 2012, ISBN 978-88-07-01907-4.
- Una lacrima color turchese, Milano, Mondadori, 2014, ISBN 978-88-04-64945-8.
- Favola in bianco e nero, Milano, Mondadori, 2015, ISBN 978-88-04-66114-6.

=== Essays and manuals ===
- La montagna. Chiacchierata con ventun giovani all'osteria Gallo Cedrone in una notte di primavera del 2002, with 2 CDs, Pordenone, Biblioteca dell'immagine, 2002, ISBN 88-87881-69-3.
- Un destino nel volo. Vajont 1963, with Luciano Zanelli, Santa Giustina, Polaris, 2003; II ed., Edizioni Filò, 2013; Belluno, Belluno, Banca AntonVeneta, 2013. [about Giovanni Zanelli]
- Vajont: quelli del dopo, Milano, Mondadori, 2006, ISBN 88-04-55817-2.
- Guida poco che devi bere. Manuale a uso dei giovani per imparare a bere, Milano, Mondadori, 2013, ISBN 978-88-04-62503-2.
- Confessioni ultime. Una meditazione sulla vita, la natura, il silenzio, la libertà, with a Giorgio Fornoni's movie in DVD, Milano, Chiarelettere, 2013, ISBN 978-88-6190-428-6; TEA, Milano, 2020.
- Quasi niente, with Luigi Maieron, Milano, Chiarelettere, 2017, ISBN 978-88-619-0906-9.
- Il passo del vento. Sillabario alpino. Milano: Mondadori. 2019. ISBN 978-88-047-0965-7.
- Arrampicare. Una storia di rocce, di sfide e d'amore. Milano: Solferino. 2022. ISBN 978-88-282-0900-3.

=== Poetry ===
- La ballata della donna ertana, Collana Scrittori italiani e stranieri, Milano, Mondadori, 2011, ISBN 978-88-04-60869-1.

== Movies ==
- Vajont, directed by Renzo Martinelli (2001).
- La notte dei giochi, directed by Ronnie Roselli (2008).
- L'arca di legno, directed by Domenico De Ceglia (TV series, 2019).
- Alberi che camminano, directed by Mattia Colombo (Documentary, 2015).

== Acknowledgments ==
- Cardo d'argento 2008 at the 37th Premio Itas del libro di montagna for Cani, camosci, cuculi (e un corvo).
- Premio Bancarella 2011 for La fine del mondo storto.
- Christmas Love 2011 (Christmas Film Festival) "for his boundless love for nature"
- Premio Mario Rigoni Stern 2014, narrative section, for the work "La voce degli uomini freddi".
- Premio Selezione Campiello 2014
- Award for the environment 2016 at Tignano Festival (Barberino Tavarnelle - Firenze).
- Literary award "La Tore", Isola d'Elba (edizione 2021), already won among others by Camilleri, Vitali and Daverio.

== Other projects ==
- Wikiquote contiene citazioni di o su Mauro Corona
- Wikimedia Commons contiene immagini o altri file su Mauro Corona

Controllo di autorità	VIAF (EN) 87404638 · ISNI (EN) 0000 0000 7825 575X · SBN CFIV059135 · LCCN (EN) n00002173 · GND (DE) 122769848 · BNE (ES) XX1666385 (data) · BNF (FR) cb144735390 (data) · J9U (EN, HE) 987007590893905171 · CONOR.SI (SL) 12673379 · WorldCat Identities (EN) lccn-n00002173
