= Soverzene =

- Comune
- Comune di Soverzene
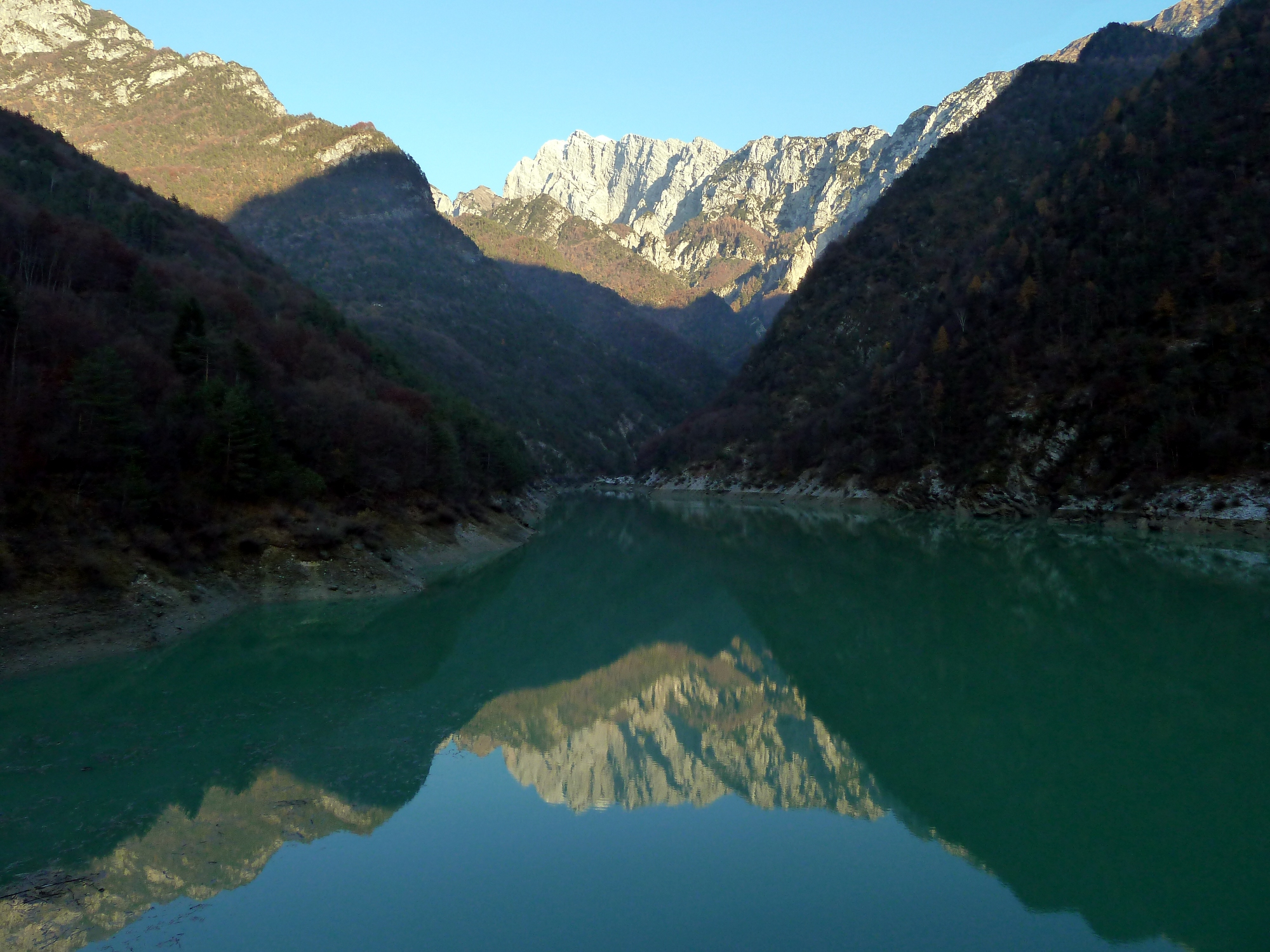
- Lake of Val Galina.

- Location within Italy Location within Veneto
- Coordinates: 46°12′N 12°18′E
- Country: Italy
- Region: Veneto
- Province: Belluno (BL)

Government
  - Mayor: Gianni Burigo

Area
  - Total: 14.8 km^{2} (5.7 sq mi)
- Elevation: 424 m (1,391 ft)

Population (31 December 2016)
  - Total: 386
  - Density: 26.1/km^{2} (67.5/sq mi)
- Demonym: Soverzenesi
- Time zone: UTC+1 (CET)
  - Summer (DST): UTC+2 (CEST)
- Postal code: 32010
- Dialing code: 0437

Soverzene is a comune (municipality) in the province of Belluno in the Italian region of Veneto, located about 90 kilometres (56 mi) north of Venice and about 10 kilometres (6 mi) northeast of Belluno.

Soverzene borders the following municipalities: Erto e Casso, Longarone, Alpago, Ponte nelle Alpi.
