= Five Moons Square =

2003 Italian political thriller film by Renzo Martinelli

- Directed by: Renzo Martinelli
- Written by: Renzo Martinelli; Fabio Campus
- Starring: Donald Sutherland
- Cinematography: Blasco Giurato
- Music by: Paolo Buonvino
- Release date: 2003
- Country: Italy
- Language: English

Five Moons Square (Italian: Piazza delle Cinque Lune), also known as Five Moons Plaza and Piazza of the Five Moons, is a 2003 political thriller film written and directed by Renzo Martinelli, who had also directed Porzûs (1997) and Vajont (2001). It is inspired by Italian politician Aldo Moro's kidnapping and murder by the Red Brigades (BR) terrorist group; the film presents a possible reconstruction of this story within a fictive conspiracy theory.

== Background ==
On 16 March 1978, around 9 am, a BR commando stationed in Rome's via Fani opened fire on the escort of Moro, kidnapping him and killing the police agents Raffaele Iozzino, Oreste Leonardi, Domenico Ricci, Giulio Rivera, and Francesco Zizzi. One notable hypothesis for the kidnapping's motive was blocking Moro's Historic Compromise with the Italian Communist Party (PCI), which would allow the PCI to become part of the Italian government.

Prior to Five Moons Square, Martinelli directed several other films, such as Porzûs (about the Porzûs massacre) and Vajont (about the Vajont disaster). In Five Moons Square, Martinelli advances the hypothesis that the BR had been manipulated by the secret services to stop Moro's proposal and the PCI's road to government, placing it in the context of other Years of Lead events, such as the Piazza della Loggia bombing and Piazza Fontana bombing (both of them committed by the far-right terrorists of Ordine Nuovo), as well as the Italicus Express bombing (by the far-right terrorists of Ordine Nero).

Regarding Moro's death, his daughter, Maria Fida Moro, discussed the outcomes of the ordeal her father suffered. She said: "I am 56 years old and since I reached the age of reason, therefore around seven years of age, I know with absolute certainty that part or all of my family will end up in a pool of blood. I always knew. My entire childhood was marred by the fact that my father and mother had threatened to take away my younger brothers and send them back cut into pieces in a suitcase." She added: "I lived like this. I absolutely didn't want a child because I didn't want to start experiencing these things again. Then the Moro case happened... and this is our life." She said that in 1974, after their trip to the United States, Moro had decided to leave politics but then his nephew, Luca Moro, was born in September 1975. She recalled an episode when Moro, talking to his mother in front of the nursery, told her: "I can't leave [politics], because they will definitely kill me, but I have to delay the catastrophe that hangs over our country for these children."

== Plot ==
Quando si dice la verità non bisogna dolersi di averla detta. La verità è sempre illuminante. Ci aiuta ad essere coraggiosi.
When you tell the truth, you shouldn't regret having said it. The truth is always illuminating. It helps to be brave.

— Aldo Moro's famous quote and the film's incipt

Rosario Saracini, a judge and chief prosecutor of Siena, is about to retire and receives an old film in Super 8 format, which was shot years earlier. The film contains footage of Moro's kidnapping which took place in via Fani, Rome, in April 1978. Saracini reveals this secret to his colleague, Fernanda Doni, and his bodyguard, Branco. The three passionately reconstruct the phases of the kidnapping. Branco notices a gentleman wearing a raincoat in the via Fani assault footage. In Milan, Saracini has the images enlarged so he can see the man's face. In the image, he recognizes him as Camillo Guglielmi, a colonel of SISMI (Italy's military intelligence agency from 1977 to 2007) who belonged to the clandestine military Operation Gladio. This leads Saracini, Doni, and Branco to start a new investigation twenty-five years after Moro's murder.

New investigations are carried out by Doni, focusing on the hideout of the Red Brigades in via Gradoli. Other anomalies emerge regarding the three committees set up by Francesco Cossiga, whose members are all affiliated with Propaganda Due (P2), and appear to be connected with the American secret services. During the investigations, Doni's children disappear, but Branco brings them home. Further strange events occur, as Doni loses her husband in an accident in which her children are also involved. After the funeral, Saracini is in the car with Branco, and an aircraft dispenses toxic gas over the car. The two escape the attack. After a phone call from the chief prosecutor of the Republic, Saracini goes to Rome for an appointment in Piazza delle Cinque Lune. (Note: This is the square that, on the side overlooking Piazza Navona, hosted offices of Christian Democracy (DC) until the early 1990s, starting with the headquarters of the party weekly La Discussione; the building is now owned by the Senate of the Republic.) Saracini goes up the stairs and arrives in front of a door which says Immobiliare Domino. In the room, he finds Branco with other people. He now understands that the bodyguard is a traitor whose task was to spy on the investigations and take possession of all the documents of the Moro Memorial. One of those letters is read by Cesare Barbetti.

La giustizia è come una tela di ragno: trattiene gli insetti piccoli, mentre i grandi trafiggono la tela e restano liberi.
Justice is like a spider's web: If some poor weak creature comes up against them, it is caught; but a big one can break through and get away.

— Solon's famous aphorism adapted to the film's closing credits (Note: The allusion to the opposing sides (pro-American and pro-Soviet) within the DC, which would have been at the origin or among the causes of the choice of Moro as a victim of the BR, is made more evident by the fact that the film's screenplay draws on Sergio Flamigni's book La tela del regno (The Spider's Web).)

The film ends with a shot that starts from Piazza delle Cinque Lune, then widens from above to frame the whole of Rome. The maze of streets and alleys of the capital is highlighted in white, as if to form a large spider web, with the starting building in the centre. A famous aphorism by Solon appears superimposed. The closing credits are accompanied by an image of Luca Moro, Moro's nephew and the author of the film's songs, who plays the song "Maledetti Voi (Signori del Potere)" ("Shame on You (Lords of the Power)" on the guitar. The background is filled with images of Moro playing with his nephew, who was still a child at the time.

== Cast ==
- Donald Sutherland as Rosario Saracini
- Giancarlo Giannini as Branco
- Stefania Rocca as Fernanda Doni
- F. Murray Abraham as The Entity
- Aisha Cerami as Ombretta Saracini
- Greg Wise as Francesco Doni
- Nicola Di Pinto as Antiquary
- Philippe Leroy as Barman

== Reception ==
In his review for La Repubblica, Paolo D'Agostini wrote: "We all know that this film, on screens on the twenty-fifth anniversary of the macabre discovery in via Caetani, recalls the kidnapping and murder of Aldo Moro. With the civil awareness, on the part of director Renzo Martinelli (of Vajont and Porzus), that he is dealing with 'the most important event in Italian history of the last half century'." (Note: About the screenplay, he commented: "The invention is reduced to a few ingredients: the Sienese setting, the three figures of the magistrate on the eve of retirement (Donald Sutherland), his collaborator (Stefania Rocca) and his bodyguard (Giancarlo Giannini), and the investigation which they dangerously reopen after the elderly judge received the film shot in via Fani by a member of the Red Brigades who had escaped identification." About the film's thesis, he said: "The rest belongs either to the trial documentation or to the wide range of hypotheses already formulated (in particular from the writings of Sergio Flamigni, consultant on the film who, it must be said, also obtained the favor of the Moro family). And yet, immediately, the substantial assumption cannot help but give shivers: Moro's fate was decided by the CIA because in 1978 the entry into the government of the largest communist party in the Western world was unacceptable, and Mario Moretti was an instrument of this design. But, immediately afterwards, comes another reaction. A) If all this is the truth, we want a court ruling to tell us. B) If no one can or wants to tell us and prove it to us, we are wasting time talking." He concluded: "And it's not nice that something so enormous and terrible is, in the end, the excuse to create a puzzle. Indeed, as the posters shout, a 'thriller' (and let's draw a veil over the final twist). It's not a thriller, it's our life.") In his review for Variety, Dennis Harvey wrote: "A somewhat old-fashioned political thriller complete with graying stars and emphasis on talk over action, 'Piazza of the Five Moons' offers reasonably engrossing intrigue as easy to forget as it is to watch. Putting a fictive conspiracy-theory spin on Christian Democratic leader Aldo Moro's 1978 kidnapping and murder, drama toplines Donald Sutherland as a retired judge drawn to reopen the case and Giancarlo Giannini as his longtime bodyguard. Outside Italy, where events remain a vivid memory, smoothly mounted item will find either quick, modest theatrical playoff or a direct track to ancillary." (Note: Harvey summarized the film thusly: "Rosario (Sutherland) has barely taken a breath after his retirement speech when he's accosted at gunpoint by an anonymous intruder who presses a small package upon him. It turns out to be an 8mm film showing from above the ambush on Moro's car, which left all his guards dead and the politico hustled off by members of the radical-left Red Brigades. This footage has evidently been kept secret ever since; Rosario quickly ascertains that its images contradict the official version of the incident on several points. Protag's only confidants in this pursuit are Branco (Giannini) and Fernanda (Stefania Rocca), latter a young magistrate once mentored by Rosario." About the film's thesis, he commented: "Natch, unseen forces soon try to thwart their effort; at last, the Italian Secret Police and the CIA become implicated in what had seemingly been a strictly far-left terrorist act. Denouement is a bit of a letdown, with major revelation of one figure's 'surprise' identity coming as no surprise at all." He further commented: "Scenic forays to Milan, Rome and Paris (where Rosario meets with another Deep Throat-like figure played by F. Murray Abraham) and brisk editing help break up the potential tedium of a piece that's largely three people sitting in rooms, spewing forth speculation. Apart from the safety threat their investigating might pose to Fernanda's family (alone among lead characters here, she has a living spouse and young children), relatively little suspense is generated. There's no present-tense action until a brief, perfunctory car/plane chase in the last reel." On the positive side, he stated: "Biggest plus in maintaining some sense of urgency comes from the B&W faux-8mm sequences, which eventually grow to encompass not just the 'secret film' but also the scenarios that principals gradually piece together. These possess an immediacy that is raw and convincing." About the actors, he said: "Sutherland's distinctive voice has been replaced by a dubbed one (Sergio Graziani), but once one get used to that, his perf is fine, even if he's never particularly credible as an Italian. Rocca's alert presence adds some color, though Giannini looks unhappy with a role that too often leaves him sitting around, grimly listening to the other two. Lensing makes the most of occasional opportunities for sight-seeing, though interior sequences are a tad monochromatic. Director Renzo Martinelli ('Porzus,' 'Vajont') imbues project with somewhat impersonal gloss; tech and design aspects are likewise polished in a neutral fashion.")

In his Palcoscenico review, Osvaldo Contenti wrote: "'Five Moons Square' is the effective demonstration that it is possible to tell important chapters of Italian history with a modern film language, full of suspense and action. In this key, Renzo Martinelli's film explores the 'Moro affair' with a philological attention worthy of the best Francesco Rosi (see 'The Mattei Affair'), but with a greatly accentuated rhythm and inserts of dramaturgical fiction aimed at fueling the pathos of the narrative. The author had already provided us with excellent evidence of investigative films with a high level of dynamism with the previous 'Porzus' (1997) and 'Vajont' (2001), but in this new film Martinelli surpasses himself because his work rewrites and rekindles the spotlight on the most dramatic Italian event of the post-war period: the kidnapping and subsequent assassination of the Hon. Aldo Moro by the Red Brigades." He concluded that "the film makes use of the splendid performances of Donald Sutherland, Giancarlo Giannini, Stefania Rocca, and Murray Abraham, a qualitative poker of aces that enhances a film already of excellent stylistic workmanship."

For Mymovies.it, Davide Verrazzani wrote: "Renzo Martinelli, now in his fourth film, confirms himself as an uncomfortable interpreter of our most recent past. After the internal wars between partisans and the Vajont tragedy, he concludes a cycle by scripting the Moro kidnapping in a thriller style. He doesn't lack courage, nor the means, but the profession and a fat wallet are not enough to transform history into film, and Martinelli remains anchored to the past as director of commercials, with the ability to find effective shots and the marginality of dialogues and environments." He concluded: "The result is a film that adds nothing to the story of Moro's kidnapping, still full of secrets, leaving out any attempt at a civil complaint and instead aping the most popular television dramas."

In his review for Il mondo dei doppiatori, Fabio Stellato wrote: "Renzo Martinelli brings to the screen the not new and not far-fetched version according to which the death of Aldo Moro was the result of an international conspiracy which included, in addition to the Red Brigades, the Italian secret services, and the CIA, with the aim of preventing the Historic Compromise that Moro was to reach and that he would see PCI and DC in government together; at the time it was, in fact, unacceptable for a Communist party to be part of the government of a Western country." He concluded: "Set in an evocative Siena, the film is, however, not unforgettable, and if the historical reconstruction is detailed and well done, the screenplay that serves as its backdrop is rather banal and a final coup de thèatre (far from unexpected) is not enough to redeem it."

In her review for Movieplayer.it, Claudia Catalli wrote: "This film by Enzo Martinelli, distributed by the Istituto Luce, is striking. It is striking for the impeccable precision of the screenplay, for the effective photographic rendering, for the meticulous and faithful historical reconstruction, as well as for the good interpretation of the actors and last but not least the great direction, capable of making the film slide along different levels, from the detective to thriller, action film, drama, historical, sentimental." (Note: Catalli further commented: "Leaving aside discussing the convenience of the choice of subject — undoubtedly a risky and perhaps provocative choice: in the film it is said that Moro's kidnapping was actually decided by the CIA, guilty of having manipulated the Red Brigades — it must be said that Five Moons Square boasts a discreet suggestive power not only thanks to the meticulous architecture which from filmic ultimately becomes urban planning, so to speak, but also thanks to the performers who are on average (and let's underline average) convincing." About the actors, she said: "Apart from Stefania Rocca, who remains poised between yes and no (much less expressive than her usual, except for the incisive scene in the hospital with her children), Giancarlo Giannini proves himself to be an actor of looks, rather than of words, and succeeds to hold his own against Donald Sutherland — don't miss the final face-to-face." She praised the ending, saying: "If it is true that in some places the story becomes obvious and predictable, it is also true on the other hand that the defects still present in the film are quickly forgiven thanks to the end credits, which give the emotion of Luca Moro who, guitar in hand, he rails against all those who knew and didn't know, who saw and didn't see, even unaware accomplices of his grandfather's tragic end: 'Shame on you!'") She concluded: "Finally, the film is actually divided into two parts — in the first we witness a scrupulous historical reconstruction of the kidnapping, studied and dissected by the magistrates down to the smallest detail, while in the second, decidedly more intriguing, the camera carefully follows all the moves of the witty Saracini, silently spying at the same time on the opponent's counterattack, as in a thrilling game of chess where, however, there is no real winner. Or rather, the one who cheats wins, the one who manages to disguise his identity until the last moment; the subterfuge, the lies, the cobwebs of an evil policy win. At the final screen the message of the film is delivered, an unforgettable message for its cursed, raw truth: 'Justice is like a spider's web: it holds back the small insects, while the large ones pierce the web and remain free' (Solon)."

The il Davinotti review compared the Moro affair to the assassination of John F. Kennedy. (Note: They wrote: "The Moro case represents for Italy what Kennedy's murder was in America: an assassination which still today presents many gray areas probably linked to para-governmental interventions undertaken to stem the government's drift to the left. Try to think about what would happen if suddenly a Zapruder-style film emerged for Moro too, filming the ambush on via Fani live. This is what the authors of Renzo Martinelli's film imagined, which starts from the discovery of a Super 8 showing precisely this, given to a retired judge (Donald Sutherland) by a mysterious character who proclaims himself to be the passenger (Red Brigade member) of the phantom Honda seen in via Fani just before the fateful moment. An incredible discovery which consequently offers new hypotheses, secretly reopening the case. Sutherland, with the help of Stefania Rocca and Giancarlo Giannini, follows new leads and comes to highlight the thousand times suspected interference of the secret services, Gladio, and P2 in what will remain the kidnapping par excellence. No space for politics, but rather for the eventful reconstruction of the ambush (following the rules of modern action cinema), for the clues collected and the considerations that arise spontaneously, reminding us how many falsehoods have been told by every direction about case.") They described it as a "full-blown thriller, in short, with some gross digressions into the private (a flaw that was also partly the fault of the amazing JFK) and a heartfelt interpretation by Donald Sutherland. The reliability of the new hypotheses remains to be established, but if nothing else it leads to precise and disturbing conclusions. Aldo Moro appears almost in the background, a simple cog in a gigantic mechanism." They concluded that "the hunt for the fateful memorial is still open".

== Post-film developments related to the Moro affair ==
The opening credits indicate the collaboration as historical consultant of Flamigni, who was part of the parliamentary commission of inquiry into the Moro case and provided his interpretation for the reconstruction of the facts present in the film. The film's confession of the mysterious terminally ill former BR member would have anticipated some events that occurred a few years after the release of the film, namely the 2009 discovery of a letter, which was brought to light by a former police inspector. The letter references the mysterious men on board a Honda motorbike linked to the secret services. The sender claimed to have been a former secret agent involved in the Moro case in the service of Guglielmi. The presence of Guglielmi himself, which was declared as random, was in fact ascertained in the vicinity of the ambush in via Fani as early as 1991. Martinelli stated that the man could hardly have been influenced by his film and that, in his opinion, it was a truly possible lead.

== See also ==
- Conspiracy theories about the kidnapping and murder of Aldo Moro
- Kidnapping and murder of Aldo Moro
- List of Italian films of 2003
- The Mattei Affair
- The Moro Affair
- Political fiction
