= Ponte nelle Alpi =

- Comune
- Comune di Ponte nelle Alpi
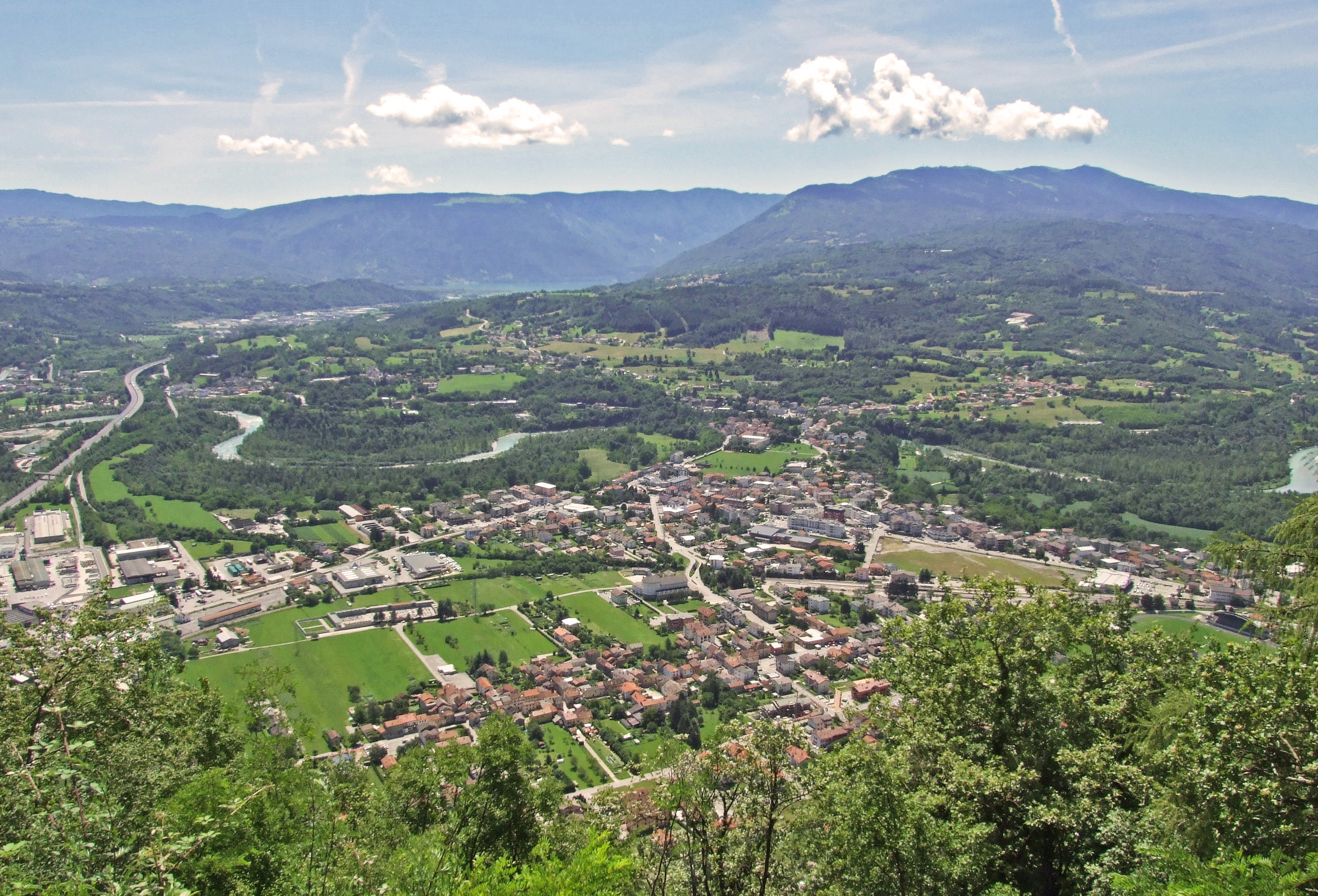

- Coat of arms

- Location within Italy Location within Veneto
- Coordinates: 46°10′58.8″N 12°16′44.76″E
- Country: Italy
- Region: Veneto
- Province: Belluno (BL)
- Frazioni: Arsiè, Cadola (communal seat), Canevoi, Casan, Col di Cugnan, Cornolade, Cugnan, La Secca, Lastreghe, Lizzona, Losego, Paiane, Piaia, Pian di Vedoia, Polpet, Ponte nelle Alpi, Quantin, Reveane, Roncan, Soccher, Vich

Government
  - Mayor: Elena Levorato

Area
  - Total: 58.0 km^{2} (22.4 sq mi)
- Elevation: 397 m (1,302 ft)

Population (31 October 2025)
  - Total: 7,917
  - Density: 136/km^{2} (354/sq mi)
- Demonym: Pontalpini
- Time zone: UTC+1 (CET)
  - Summer (DST): UTC+2 (CEST)
- Postal code: 32014
- Dialing code: 0437
- Website: Official website

Ponte nelle Alpi (English: Bridge into the Alps, Venetian: Pont) is a comune (municipality) in the Province of Belluno in the Italian region Veneto, located about 80 kilometres (50 mi) north of Venice and about 8 kilometres (5 mi) northeast of Belluno.

Ponte nelle Alpi borders the following municipalities: Belluno, Alpago, Longarone, Soverzene.

== Geography ==
The municipal territory extends along both banks of the Piave River, with elevations ranging from 378 to 2,133 meters above sea level. Three distinct zones can be distinguished:

- Right Piave: Ponte nelle Alpi, Polpet, Pian di Vedoia;
- Left Piave or Coi de Pera: Rione Santa Caterina, Lastreghe, Canevoi, Cadola (municipal seat), Piaia, Cugnan, Col di Cugnan, Losego, Roncan, Quantin, Cornolade, Lizzona, Vich, La Secca;
- Oltrai: Soccher, Arsiè, Paiane, Casan, Reveane.

== History ==
- From the Origins to the Roman Era

The oldest evidence left by civilization dates back to the Stone Age and has been identified in various locations across the region: Coi de Pera, Sass de Pescamon, and Losego.

But the unmistakable signs of a stable and widespread presence date back to the Roman era: remains of camps, residences, burials, and roads have emerged, as well as jewelry, coins, and tools. The finds were concentrated around Losego and Polpet..

- The Middle Ages

Since the early Middle Ages, the area assumed strategic importance, and three fortifications were built to defend the three valleys that converge there.

The castle of San Giorgio, near Soccher, was founded in the 6th century and was owned by the Caminesi, feudal lords and later avogari, administrators of the diocesan assets of the bishops of Belluno. The Casamatta, on the shores of the Santa Croce lake, defended the parish church of Frusseda (the main local institution, both civil and religious), facing the Fadalto saddle and thus the Lapisina Valley. The third fortification was the Castellet, north of Polpet, perhaps built on the ruins of a Cistercian monastery.

During this period, the bridge over the Piave, from which the town takes its name, took on particular importance. Mentioned since 1181, it was destroyed by the Venetians in 1412 to block the path of the invading Hungarians. Rebuilt in 1415, it was burned down in 1484, and over the next two centuries, it was destroyed and rebuilt five times.

- Contemporary age

After the Congress of Vienna, the Belluno area became part of the Kingdom of Lombardy-Veneto until 1866, when it became part of the Kingdom of Italy. In 1867, a decree dated July 7 authorized the Municipality of Capodiponte (Belluno) to adopt the name Ponte nelle Alpi (it is emphasized that the entire municipality changed its name, while the village retained its old name of Capodiponte).

After World War II, there were changes at the ecclesiastical level: in 1948, the parish of Polpét-Ponte nelle Alpi was separated from the parish of Cadola, and in 1956 the Parish of Col was established, and in 1957 that of Quantìn.
