= List of presidents of the Province of Belluno =

President of the Province of Belluno
- Presidente della Provincia di Belluno
- Incumbent; Marco Staunovo Polacco since 19 March 2026
- Term length: 4 years
- Inaugural holder: Giuseppe Gerenziani
- Formation: 1889

The president of the Province of Belluno is the head of the provincial government in Belluno, Veneto, Italy. The president oversees the administration of the province, coordinates the activities of the municipalities, and represents the province in regional and national matters.

Since March 2026, the office has been held by Marco Staunovo Polacco, a centre-right independent.

== List ==
=== Presidents of the Provincial Deputation (1889–1926) ===
Nº	Portrait	Name	Term start	Term end	Party
1		Giuseppe Gerenziani	1889	1908	
2		Ottorino Nobis	1908	1911	
3		Luigi Basso	1911	1914	
4		Andrea Prosdocimi	1914	?	

=== Presidents of the Provincial Rectorate (1926–1945) ===
No.	Portrait	Name	Term of office		Party
No.	Portrait	Name	Start	End	Party
		Alberto Cian	1934	1939	National Fascist Party
		Mario Luciani	1939	1940	National Fascist Party

=== Presidents of the Provincial Deputation (1945–1951) ===
No.	Portrait	Name	Term of office		Party
No.	Portrait	Name	Start	End	Party
1		Attilio Tissi	1945	1951	Action Party

=== Presidents of the Province (1951–present) ===
Nº	Portrait	Name	Term of office		Party
Nº	Portrait	Name	Start	End	Party
		?	1951	?	?
		Alessandro Da Borso	?	1965	Christian Democracy
		Gianfranco Orsini	1965	1967	Christian Democracy
		Giovanni Fontana	1967	1970	Christian Democracy
		Gianfranco Orsini	1970	1972	Christian Democracy
		Andrea Baratto	1972	1975	Christian Democracy
		Dino Riva	1975	1976	Italian Democratic Socialist Party
		Mario Paolini	1976	1980	Italian Democratic Socialist Party
		Renato Costantini	1980	1985	Italian Socialist Party
		Elio Daurù	28 October 1985	10 August 1990	Christian Democracy
		Oscar De Bona	10 August 1990	24 April 1995	Italian Socialist Party; Independent (centre-left)
		Oscar De Bona	24 April 1995	28 June 1999	Italian Socialist Party; Independent (centre-left)
		Oscar De Bona	28 June 1999	29 June 2004	Italian Socialist Party; Independent (centre-left)
		Sergio Reolon	29 June 2004	23 June 2009	Independent (centre-left)
		Gianpaolo Bottacin	23 June 2009	31 October 2011	Liga Veneta–Lega Nord
		Vittorio Capocelli	31 October 2011	13 October 2014	Prefectural commissioner
		Daniela Larese Filon	13 October 2014	12 June 2017	Italian Socialist Party
		Roberto Padrin	10 September 2017	10 December 2021	Civic list
		Roberto Padrin	10 December 2021	18 March 2026	Civic list
		Marco Staunovo Polacco	18 March 2026	Incumbent	Liga Veneta–Lega

== Sources ==
- "Storia amministrativa dell'ente". Ministero dell'Interno.
- Agostini, Filiberto (2012). Il governo locale nel Veneto all'indomani della liberazione. Milan: FrancoAngeli.
- Menichini, Piera (2005). "I presidenti delle Province dall'Unità alla Grande guerra: repertorio analitico". Storia Amministrazione Costituzione (13): 231–232.
