= Erto e Casso =

Erto e Casso Nert e Cas (Friulian)
- Comune
- Comune di Erto e Casso
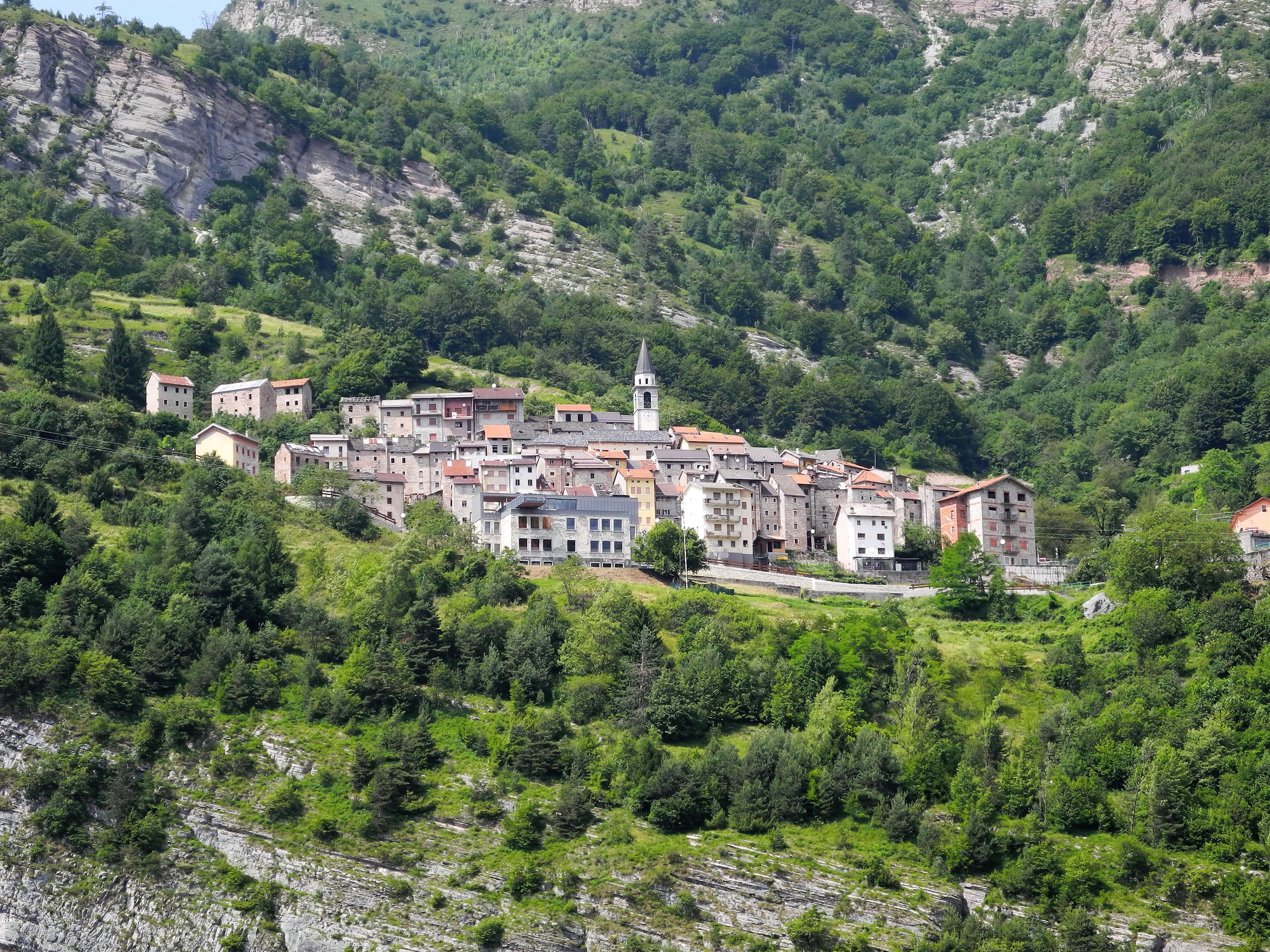
- View of a central road in Erto

- Coat of arms

- Erto e Casso within the Province of Pordenone

- Location within Italy Location within Friuli-Venezia Giulia
- Coordinates: 46°16′37.31″N 12°22′19.13″E
- Country: Italy
- Region: Friuli-Venezia Giulia
- Province: Pordenone (PN)
- Frazioni: Casso, Erto (municipal seat)

Government
  - Mayor: Antonio Carrara

Area
  - Total: 52.3 km^{2} (20.2 sq mi)
- Elevation: 775 m (2,543 ft)

Population (30 June 2017)
  - Total: 378
  - Density: 7.23/km^{2} (18.7/sq mi)
- Demonym: Ertani
- Time zone: UTC+1 (CET)
  - Summer (DST): UTC+2 (CEST)
- Postal code: 33080
- Dialing code: 0427
- Website: Official website

Erto e Casso (Standard Friulian: Nert e Cjas, locally: Nert e Cas) is a comune (municipality) in the Regional decentralization entity of Pordenone in the Italian region of Friuli-Venezia Giulia, located about 130 kilometres (81 mi) northwest of Trieste and about 40 kilometres (25 mi) northwest of Pordenone.

== Geography ==
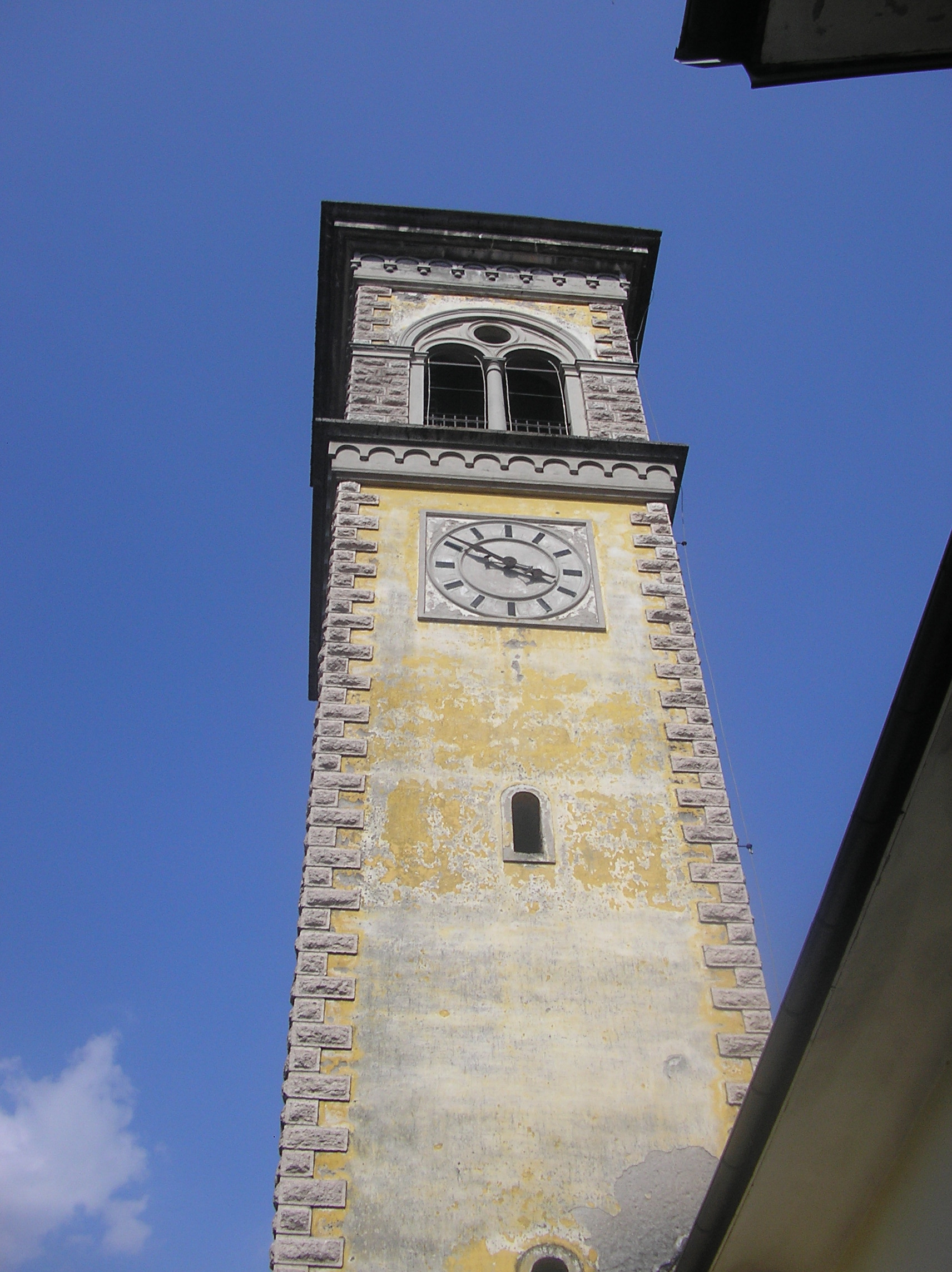
The campanile of the Church of Erto

The commune consists of Erto (the municipal seat, population: 341), Casso (population: 35), and some smaller places: Cavalle, Col della Ruava, Forcai, Liron, Pineda, San Martino and Val del Pont.

Erto e Casso borders the municipalities of Castellavazzo, Cimolais, Claut, Longarone, Ospitale di Cadore, Perarolo di Cadore, Alpago and Soverzene. All the bordering municipalities, except Cimolais and Claut, are part of the nearby Province of Belluno, in Veneto.

The comune is composed by the main settlements of Erto, the administrative seat, and Casso. The other hamlets, (frazioni), composed by few scattered farmhouses, are the localities of Forcai, Pineda, San Martino, and Val da Pont.

== History ==
=== Early history ===
The village of Erto was first mentioned in 8th century. Differently from Casso, in which is spoken bellunese (a Venetian dialect), the local language is a dialect of Ladin language, colloquially named ertano.

=== Vajont disaster ===
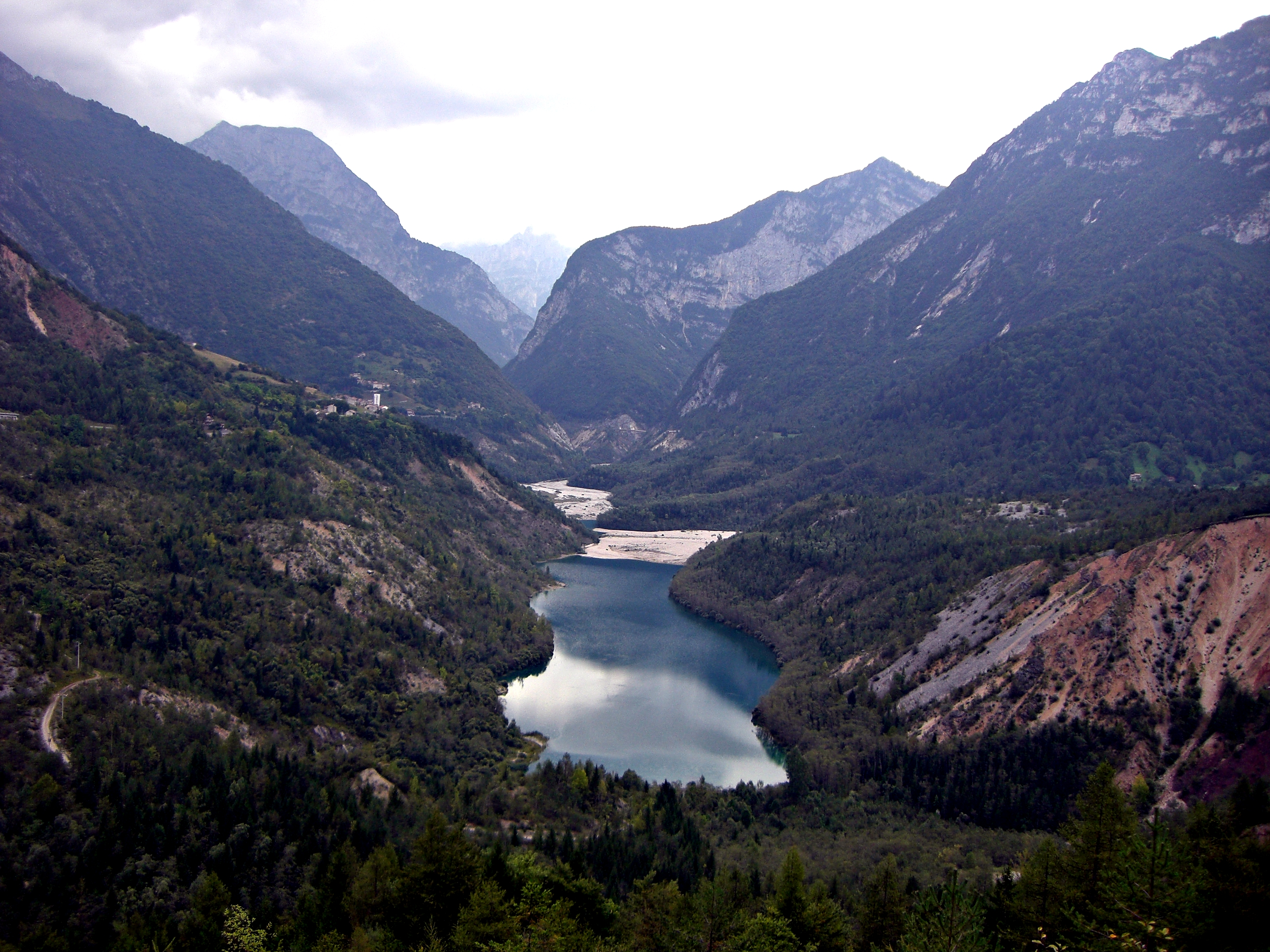
The Vajont Lake.

Erto and Casso were the two villages in the Vajont (/vaˈjɔnt/) valley, above the artificial lake, before the Vajont Dam disaster on 9 October 1963. The landslide and flood killed almost 2,000 people in total, destroying five villages in the Piave valley but leaving Erto and Casso only slightly damaged. The two villages were cautionally evacuated within three days of the disaster and the valley stayed empty for three years thereafter. During those years, some of the survivors settled down in the Maniago municipality, creating what would become the new Vajont municipality from 1971.

Three years after evacuation, some other survivors, in spite of being forbidden to return to the valley, went back to their former houses and reformed the villages of Erto and Casso, which still form the municipality today.

== Notable people ==
- Mauro Corona (born 1950), writer

== See also ==
- Monte Toc
- Vajont Dam
