= Baselga di Piné =

- Comune
- Comune di Baselga di Piné
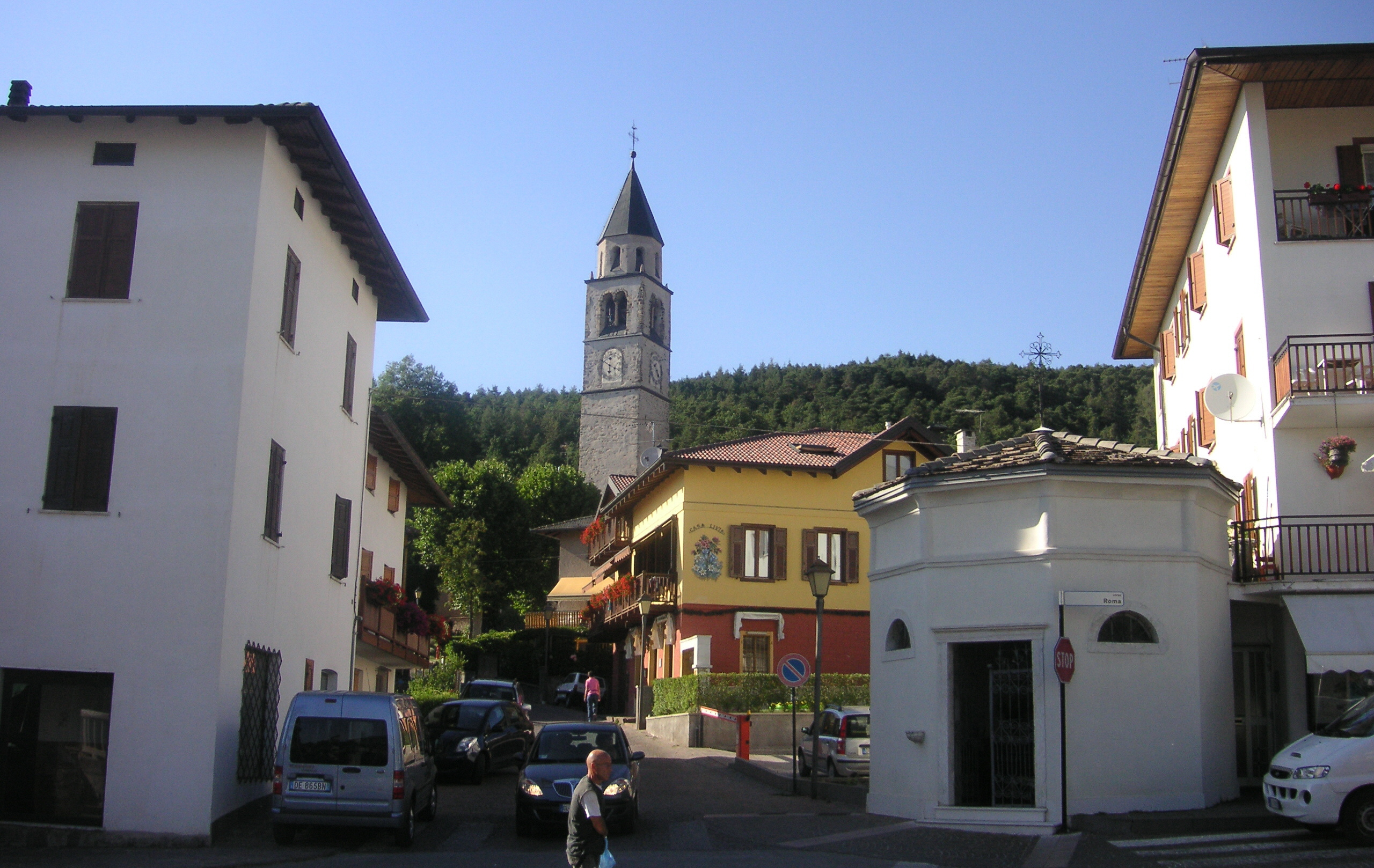

- Flag Coat of arms

- Location within Italy Location within Trentino-Alto Adige/Südtirol
- Coordinates: 46°8′N 11°14′E
- Country: Italy
- Region: Trentino-Alto Adige/Südtirol
- Province: Trentino (TN)
- Frazioni: Faida (la Fàida), Miola (Miòla), Montagnaga (Montagnàga), Ricaldo, Rizzolaga, San Mauro, Sternigo, Tressilla, Vigo Ferrari

Government
  - Mayor: Alessandro Santuari

Area
  - Total: 40.8 km^{2} (15.8 sq mi)
- Elevation: 964 m (3,163 ft)

Population (2026)
  - Total: 5,326
  - Density: 131/km^{2} (338/sq mi)
- Demonym: Pinetani or Pinaitri
- Time zone: UTC+1 (CET)
  - Summer (DST): UTC+2 (CEST)
- Postal code: 38042
- Dialing code: 0461
- Patron saint: Our Lady of Caravaggio
- Saint day: 26 May
- Website: Official website

Baselga di Piné is a comune (municipality) in Trentino in the Italian region Trentino-Alto Adige/Südtirol, located about 12 kilometres (7 mi) northeast of Trento.

== People ==
- Riccardo Garrone
- Damiano Tommasi
- Roberto Sighel
- Matteo Anesi
- Mauro Corona
- Giuseppe Gottardi, born here, was Archbishop of Montevideo, Uruguay

== Sport ==
- Ice Rink Piné
- 2013 Winter Universiade
- Speed skating at the 2013 Winter Universiade
- 2019 World Junior Speed Skating Championships
