= Marco Staunovo Polacco =

Italian politician (born 1973)

President of the Province of Belluno
- Incumbent
- Assumed office 19 March 2026
- Preceded by: Roberto Padrin

Mayor of Comelico Superiore
- Incumbent
- Assumed office 26 May 2014
- Preceded by: Mario Zandonella Necca

Personal details
- Born: 26 October 1973 (age 52) Pieve di Cadore, Veneto, Italy
- Party: Liga Veneta–Lega
- Occupation: Civil engineer

Marco Staunovo Polacco (born 26 October 1973) is an Italian politician serving as president of the Province of Belluno since 2026. He has served as mayor of Comelico Superiore since 2014. He is a member of Liga Veneta–Lega.

In March 2026, Staunovo Polacco was elected president of the Province of Belluno as the candidate of the centre-right coalition, comprising Lega, Brothers of Italy and Forza Italia. He defeated Nicola Vieceli, the centre-left candidate, with 61.76% of the weighted vote against 38.24%.
