= Roberto Padrin =

Italian politician (born 1970)

President of the Province of Belluno
- In office 10 September 2017 – 19 March 2026
- Preceded by: Daniela Larese Filon
- Succeeded by: Marco Staunovo Polacco

Personal details
- Born: 22 July 1970 (age 56) Belluno, Veneto, Italy
- Party: Civic list

Roberto Padrin (born 22 July 1970) is an Italian politician serving as mayor of Longarone since 2009. He served as president of the province of Belluno from 2017 to 2026.
