= Casso, Pordenone =

Casso
- Frazione
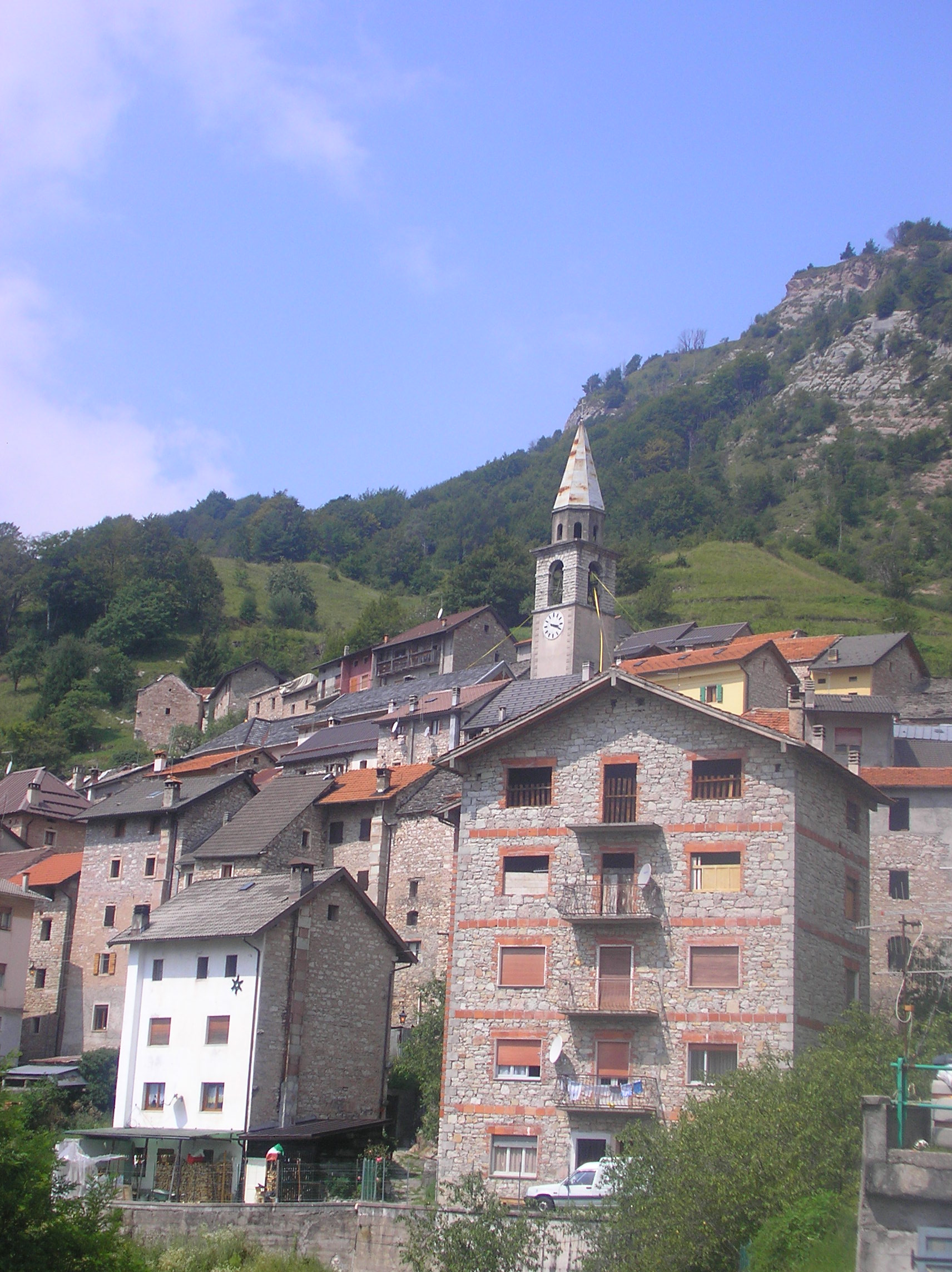
- View of the village

- Location of Casso in Italy
- Coordinates: 46°16′18″N 12°19′55″E
- Country: Italy
- Region: Friuli-Venezia Giulia
- Province: Pordenone
- Comune: Erto e Casso
- Elevation: 950 m (3,120 ft)

Population (2009)
  - Total: 26
- Time zone: UTC+1 (CET)
  - Summer (DST): UTC+2 (CEST)
- Postal code: 33080
- Dialing code: 0427

Casso (Cas in local dialect, Sćjas in Friulan) is an Italian village, frazione of Erto e Casso, in the Province of Pordenone. Its population is 35. Together with Erto, its administrative seat, it forms the municipality of Erto-Casso.

== Geography ==
The village is situated in Friuli, close to the borders with the Province of Belluno, Veneto. It was built under the Salta mountain, in front of the Toc mountain, upon the Vajont river valley. Linked with a street to the National Road 251, it is 3 km from Erto, 4 from Castellavazzo and 5 from Longarone.

== History ==
=== Early history ===
First mentioned in 1332, it was stably inhabited from 1558 by lumberjacks from the province of Belluno. The colloquial language spoken in Casso is the bellunese, a Venetian dialect. Historically and culturally different from Erto, in which is spoken a Ladin dialect, Casso also belongs to the Diocese of Belluno-Feltre, different from the one of Erto.

=== The Vajont disaster ===
Located near the Vajont Dam, Casso was one of the villages involved in the disaster of October 9, 1963. Partly damaged like Erto, the village was evacuated, and in 1971 its population was transferred in Vajont, a new municipality built near Maniago. In 1966 some of the inhabitants moved back into their houses to repopulate the village, as had been done in Erto, and the comune.
