= Comelico Superiore =

- Comune
- Comune di Comelico Superiore
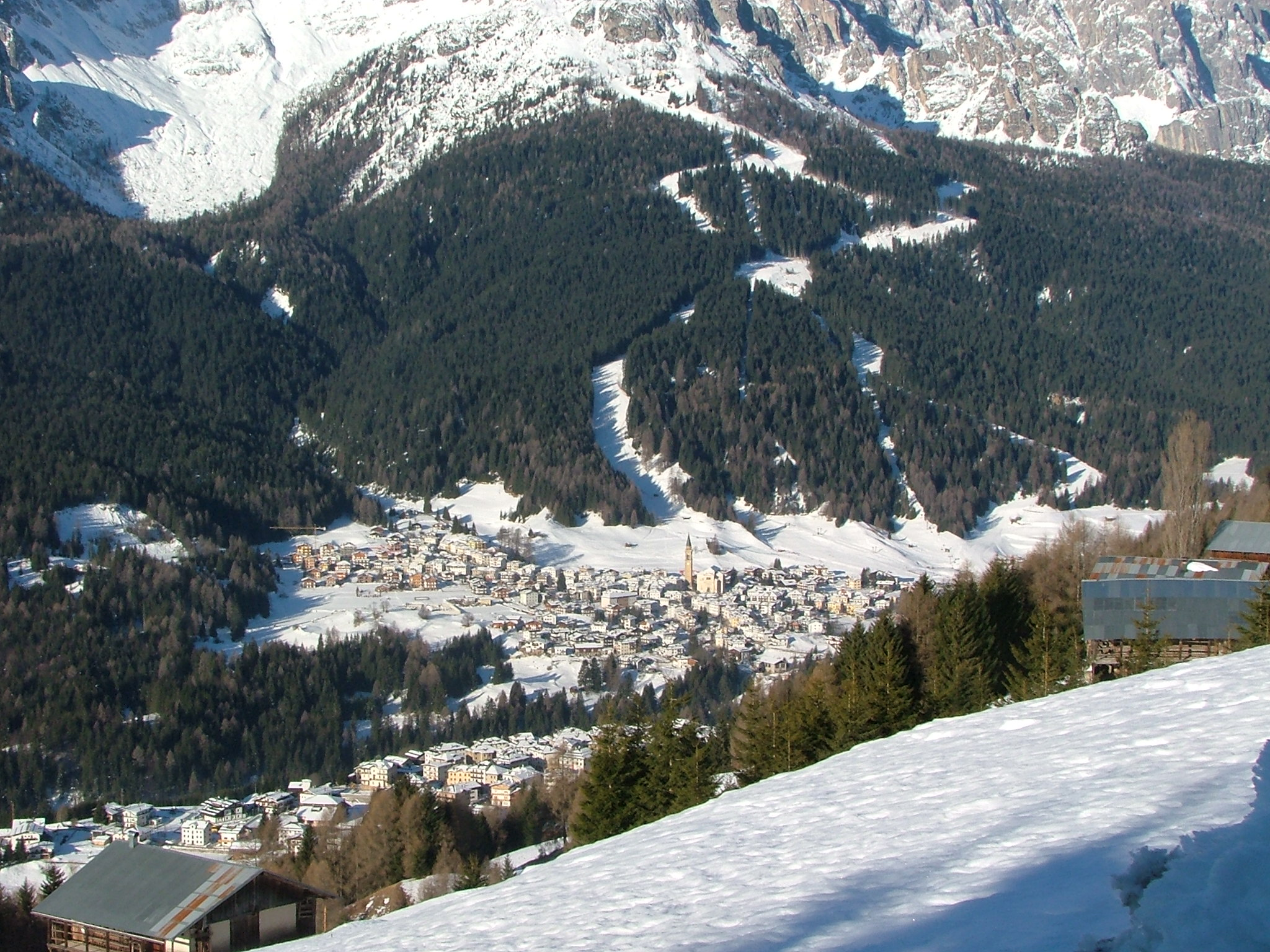
- Padola of Comelico Superiore

- Location of the municipality of Comelico Superiore in the province of Belluno

- Location within Italy Location within Veneto
- Coordinates: 46°35′N 12°31′E
- Country: Italy
- Region: Veneto
- Province: Belluno (BL)
- Frazioni: Candide (seat of the municipality), Casamazzagno, Dosoledo, Padola

Government
  - Mayor: Marco Staunovo Polacco

Area
  - Total: 95.9 km^{2} (37.0 sq mi)
- Elevation: 1,210 m (3,970 ft)

Population (30 November 2025)
  - Total: 2,060
  - Density: 21.5/km^{2} (55.6/sq mi)
- Demonym: Comelicesi
- Time zone: UTC+1 (CET)
  - Summer (DST): UTC+2 (CEST)
- Postal code: 32040
- Dialing code: 0435
- Website: Official website

Comelico Superiore (Ladin: Cumelgu d Sora) is a scattered municipality in the Province of Belluno in the Italian region Veneto, located about 130 kilometres (81 mi) north of Venice and about 60 kilometres (37 mi) northeast of Belluno, on the border with Austria.

Comelico Superiore does not have a town named after the municipality and it is divided into four hamlets: Candide, which is the municipal seat, Casamazzagno, Dosoledo, Padola.

Comelico Superiore borders the following municipalities: Auronzo di Cadore, Danta di Cadore, Kartitsch (Austria), San Nicolò di Comelico, Sexten (BZ).

== History ==
In the municipal area Candide is a very ancient village, in fact in 1186 the Caminesi, or feudal lords of Cadore, stipulated the deed of sale of Monte Ombrio to the inhabitants.

=== Symbols ===
The coat of arms was granted by royal decree dated December 10, 1942; the banner was granted by Presidential Decree dated July 27, 1987.

== Monuments and places of interest ==
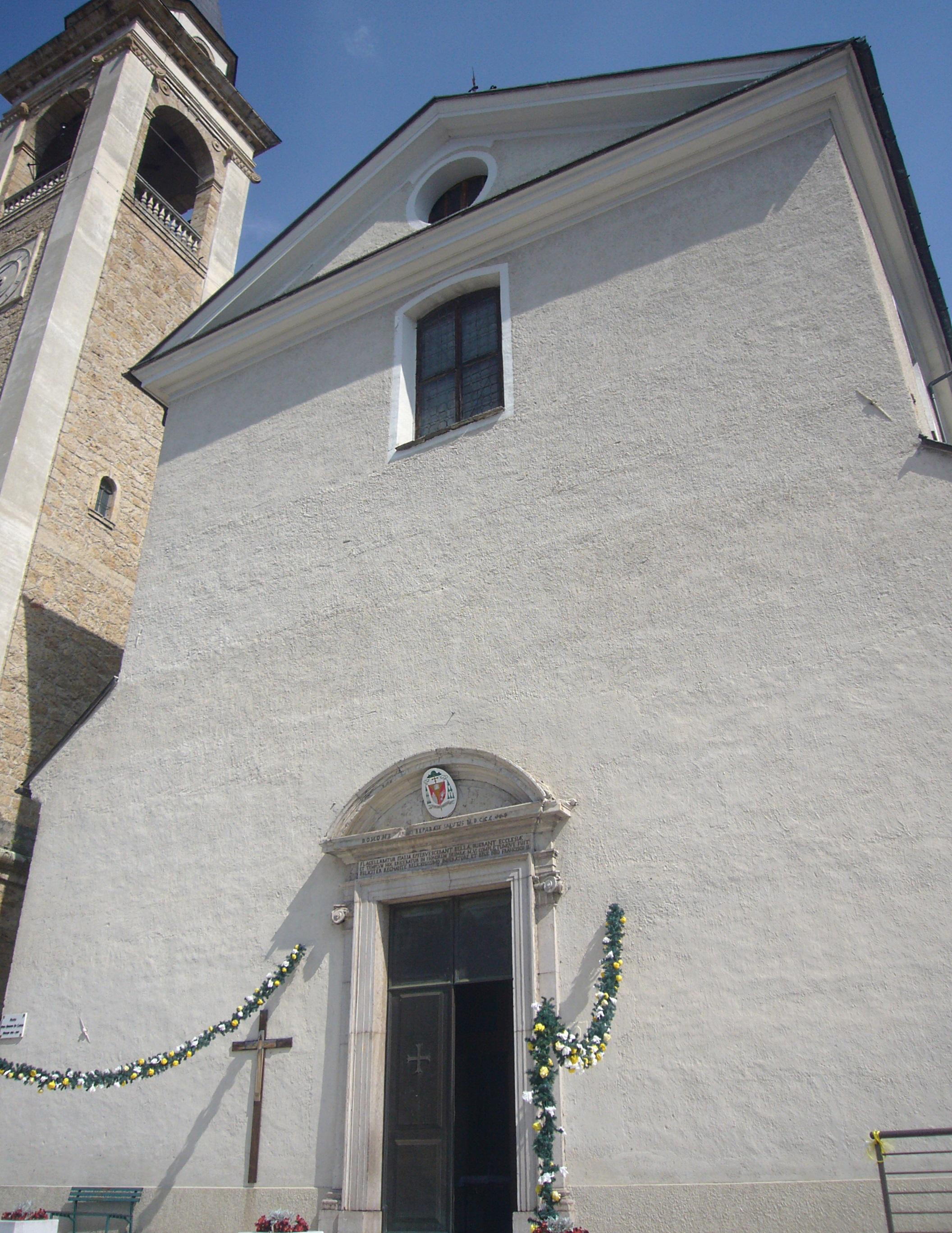
The parish church

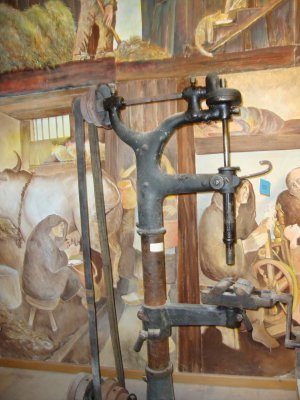
Comelico Museum of Ladin Alpine Culture, ancient drill

=== Religious architectures ===
- Church of the Blessed Virgin of Health: the church was blessed on November 21, 1870, the feast day of Our Lady of Health.
- Church of Santa Maria Assunta - Candide, famous for its historic organ.
- Church of Sant’Antonio Abate - Candide, built in the 16th century by master Nicolò Roupel.
- Church of Saints Rocco and Osvaldo - Dosoledo: neoclassical church, designed by the architect Colusso and then by Giuseppe Segusini, contains valuable frescoes and altars.
- Church of Saint Luca Evangelista - Padola: built by the architect Giuseppe Segusini between 1862 and 1869.
- Church of San Leonardo Vecchio - Casamazzagno, which offers views of the valley.

=== Civil architectures ===
- Casa Gera (Candide): Building constructed between 1100 and 1200, owned by the Gera family since 1500.
- Casa Monti-Giacobbi (Candide): Villa already existing in 1696, probably renovated during the 19th century.
- Museum of Alpine and Ladin Culture of Comelico (Padola), which collects over four thousand testimonies of Alpine life.
- "La Stua" Ethnographic Museum Casamazzagno: it was built to preserve the lifestyle and traditions of the valley's populations between the 19th and 20th centuries.
- The Zandonella Palace - From L'Aquila - Dosoledo: the palace was built in 1663 by the Zandonella-Dall'Aquila family, so called because they claimed to have received their noble title from the Holy Roman Emperor himself. The Museo Algudnei entirely dedicated to Ladin culture, housed inside this historic palece.

== Administration ==
=== Mayors since 1995 ===
| Period | | Mayor | Party | Role | Note |
|---|---|---|---|---|---|
| 1995 | 1999 | Mario Zandonella Necca | Civic list | Mayor | |
| 1999 | 2004 | Mario Zandonella Necca | Civic list | Mayor | |
| 2004 | 2009 | Luca De Martin Topranin | Civic list | Mayor | |
| 2009 | 2014 | Mario Zandonella Necca | Civic list | Mayor | |
| 2014 | 2019 | Marco Staunovo Polacco | Civic list "Crediamo nel Comelico" | Mayor | |
| 2019 | 2024 | Marco Staunovo Polacco | Civic list "Crediamo nel Comelico" | Mayor | |
| 2024 | in carica | Marco Staunovo Polacco | Civic list "Crediamo nel Comelico" | Mayor | |

== Gallery ==
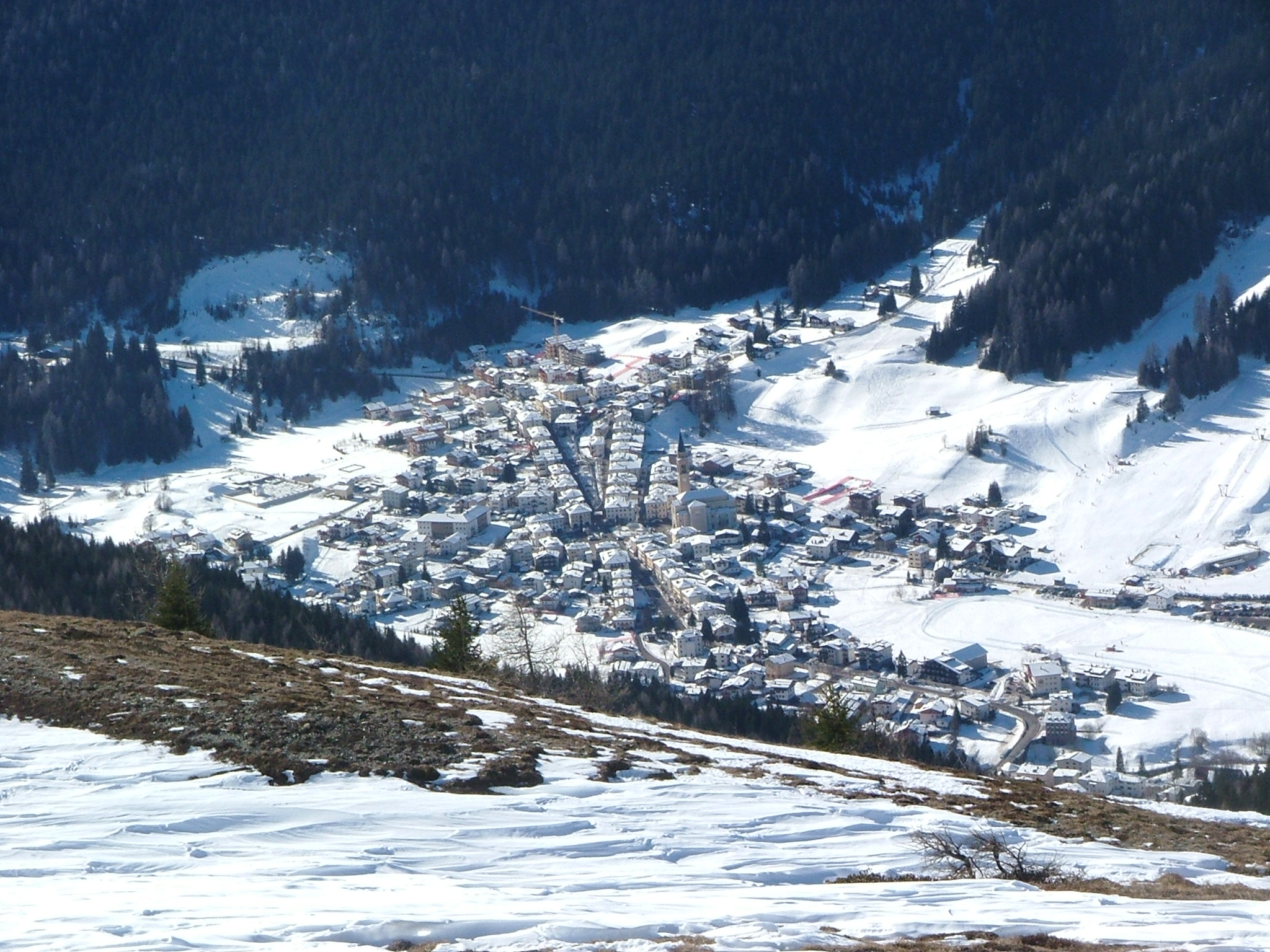
Winter landscape

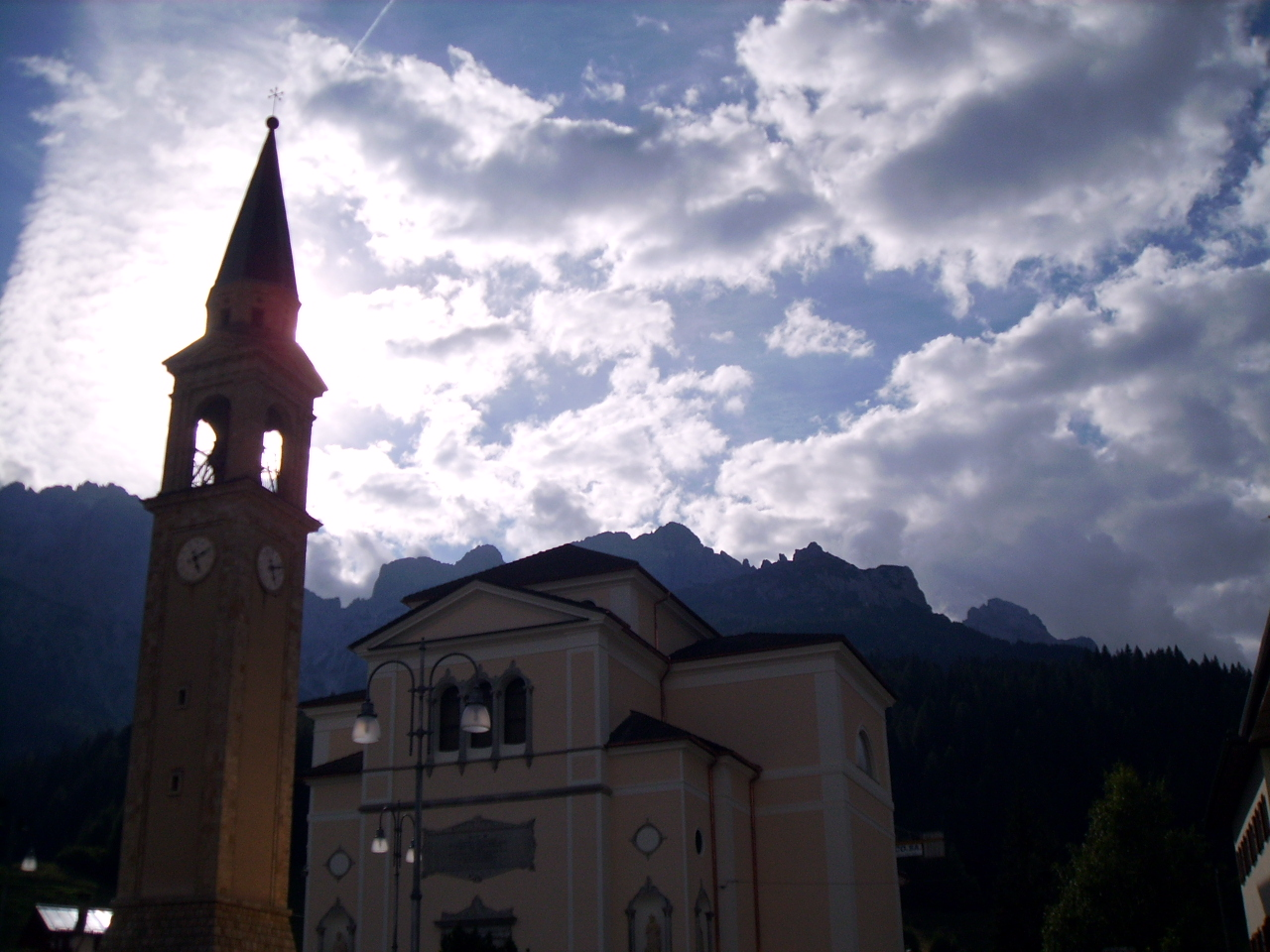
Bell tower of the church of Padola and mountains

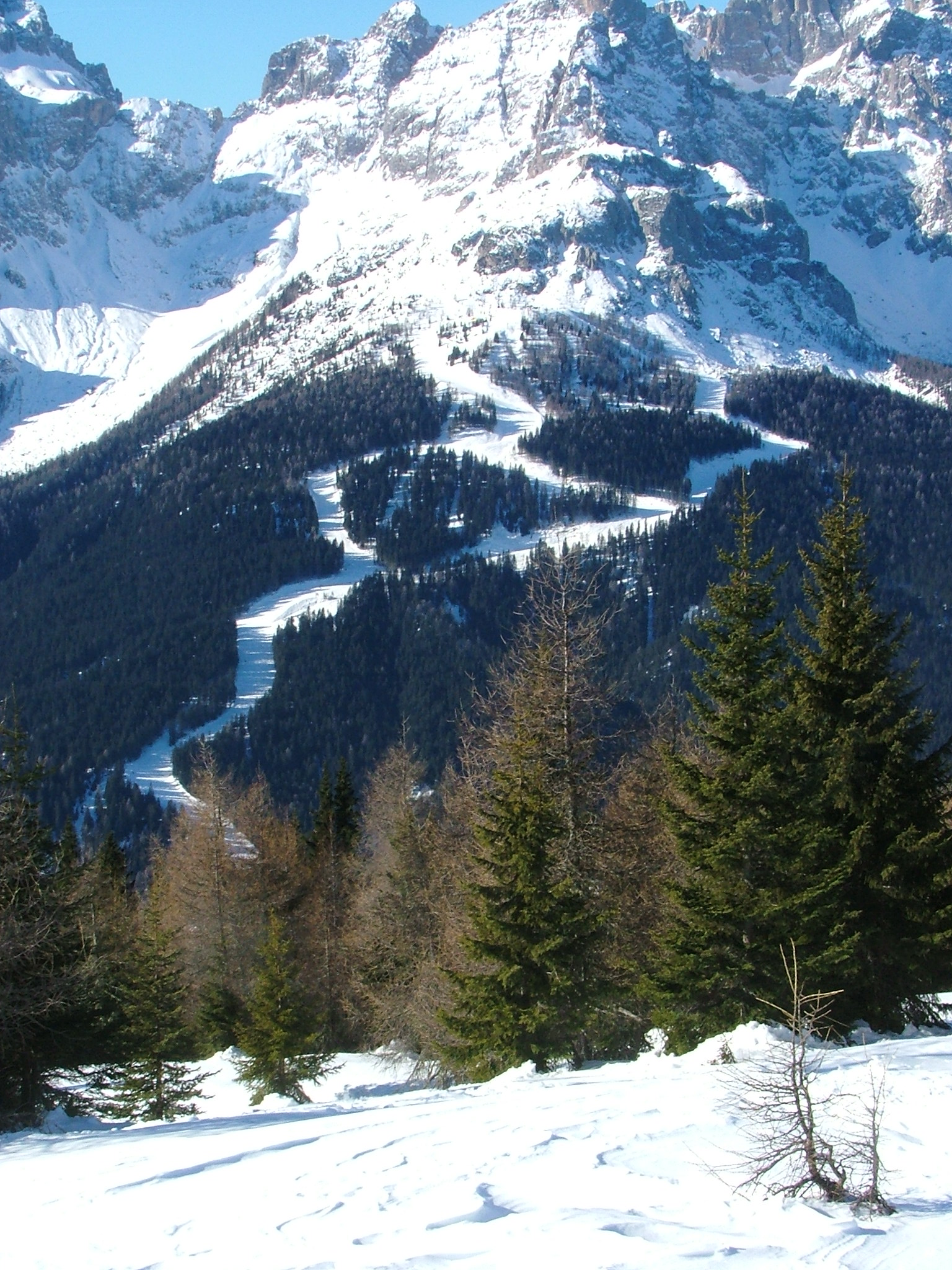
Ski slopes

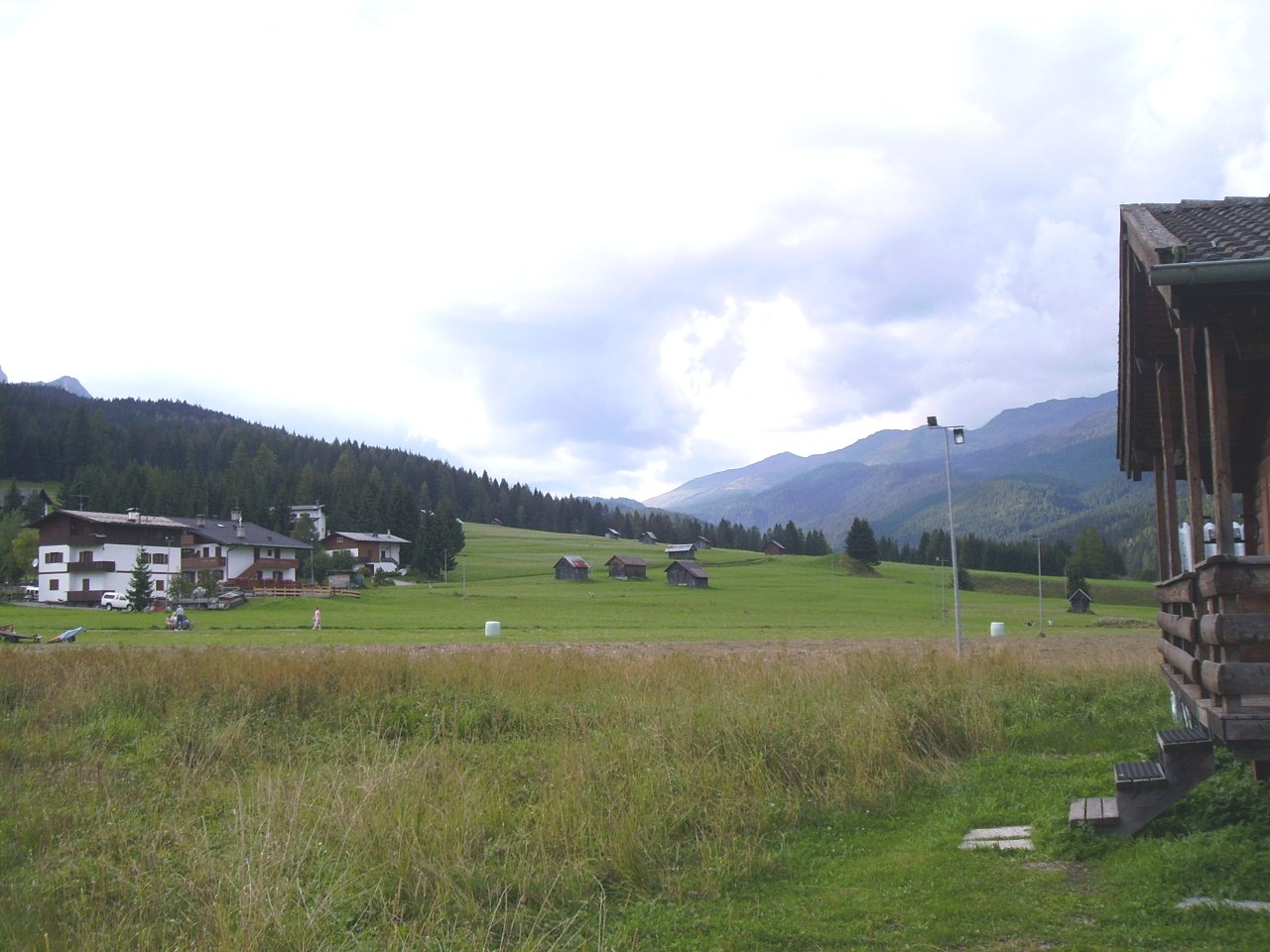
Meadows and cross-country ski trails

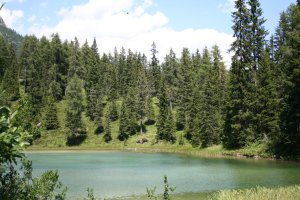
The lake at the base of Mount Ajarnola

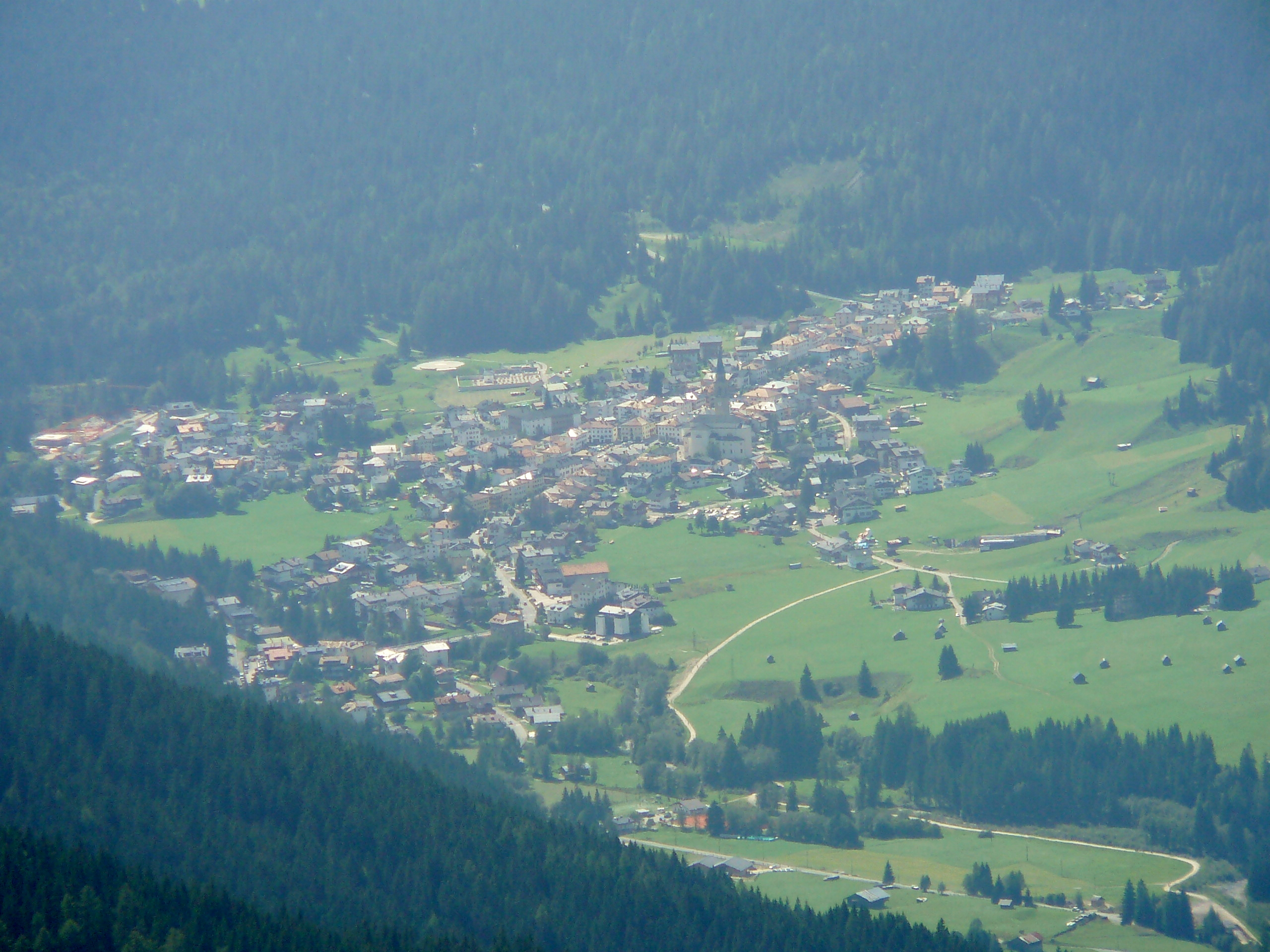
Padola seen from Col Quaternà

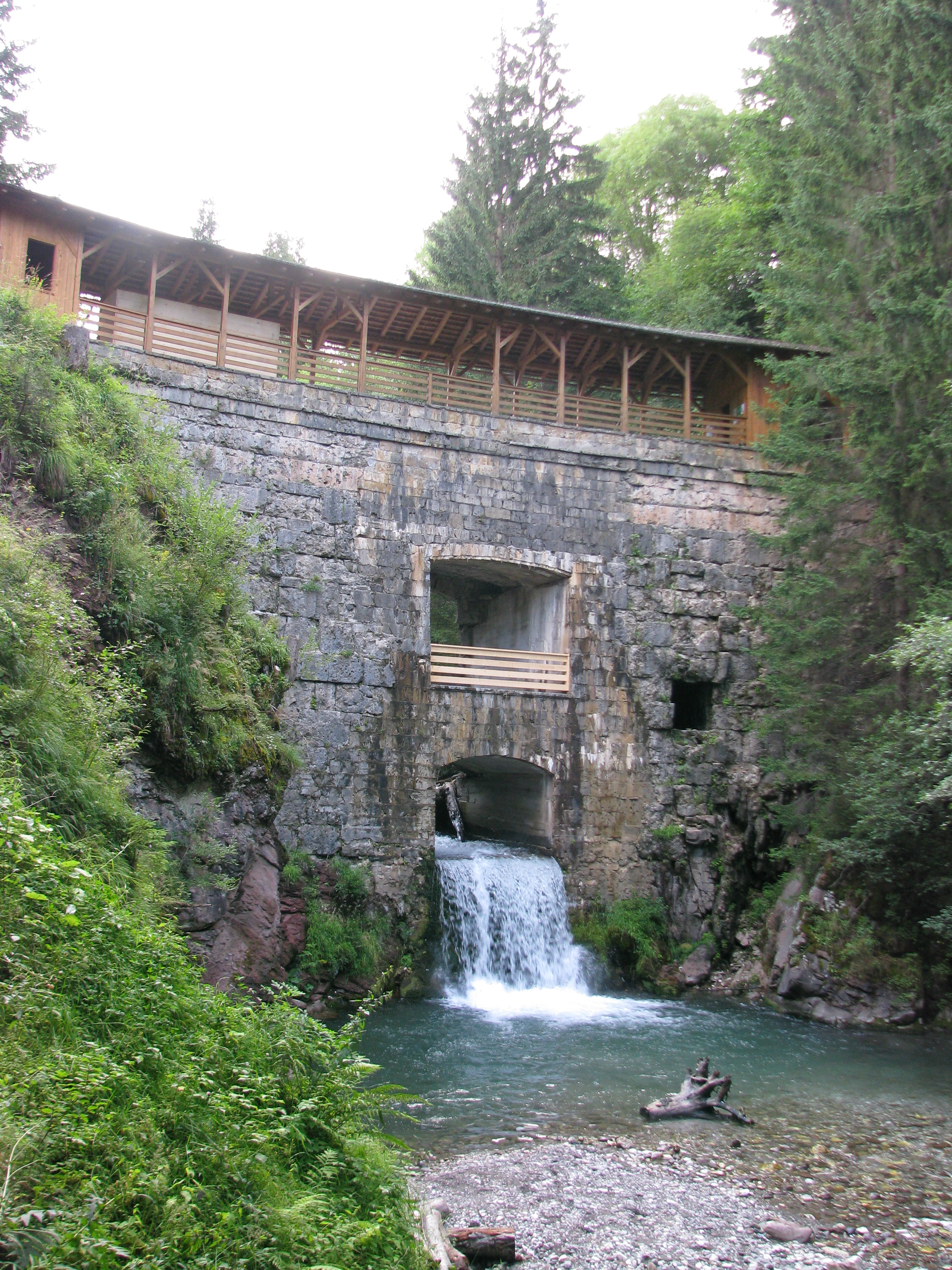
The stua on the Padola (stream)

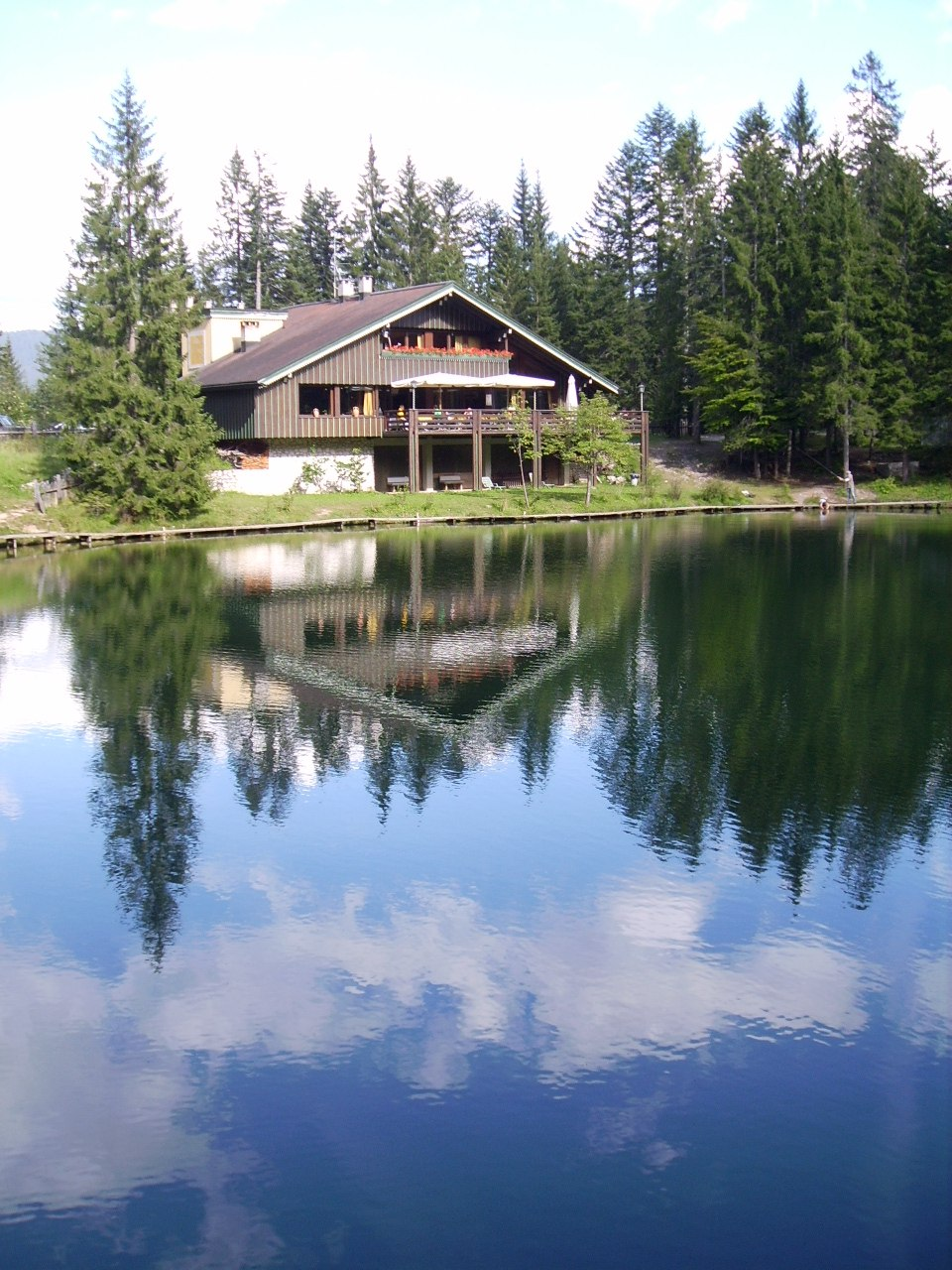
Sant'Anna Lake
