= Castellavazzo =

- Comune
- Comune di Castellavazzo
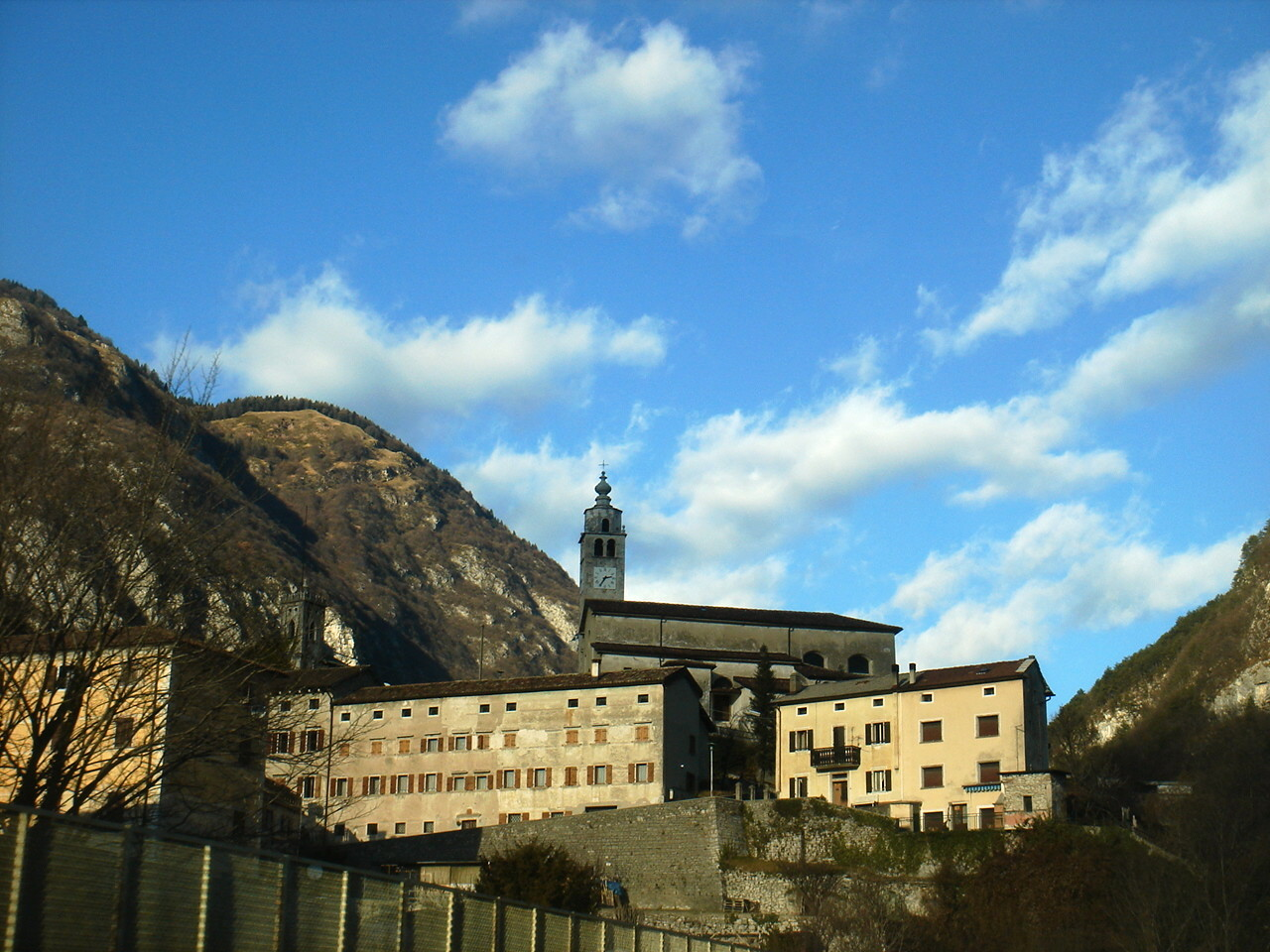
- Castellavazzo

- Location within Italy Location within Veneto
- Coordinates: 46°17′N 12°18′E
- Country: Italy
- Region: Veneto
- Province: Province of Belluno (BL)
- Frazioni: Codissago, Olantreghe, Podenzoi

Area
  - Total: 18.8 km^{2} (7.3 sq mi)

Population (Dec. 2004)
  - Total: 1,735
  - Density: 92.3/km^{2} (239/sq mi)
- Time zone: UTC+1 (CET)
  - Summer (DST): UTC+2 (CEST)
- Postal code: 32010
- Dialing code: 0437

Castellavazzo is a former comune (municipality) in the Province of Belluno in the Italian region of Veneto, located about 90 kilometres (56 mi) north of Venice and about 20 kilometres (12 mi) northeast of Belluno. As of 31 December 2004, it had a population of 1,735 and an area of 18.8 square kilometres (7.3 mi^{2}). It has become a frazione of Longarone since 2014.

== History ==
=== Vajont disaster ===
On 9 October 1963 at 10:35 pm, heavy rainfall and the 3rd drawing of the Vajont Dam triggered a landslide. It was 270 million cubic metres (9.5×10^{9} ft^{3}) of rock, forest and earth that slid into the Vajont Dam at 110 kilometres per hour (68 mph). This then caused a 250-metre (820 ft) high tsunami that overtopped the dam and flooded Castellavazzo and other villages such as Longarone, Pirago, Rivalta, Villanova, Faè, Erto e Casso and Codissago. There was also damage caused by air being displaced from the wave. About 2,000 people were killed in the landslide and tsunami, but the main structure of the dam is still there, and many tourists come to see it.

Castellavazzo borders the following municipalities: Erto e Casso, Forno di Zoldo, Longarone, Ospitale di Cadore.

== Demographic evolution ==
Historical population

Year	Pop.	±%
1861	?	—
1871	2,615	—
1881	2,279	−12.8%
1901	2,327	+2.1%
1911	2,605	+11.9%

Year	Pop.	±%
1921	2,658	+2.0%
1931	2,317	−12.8%
1936	2,166	−6.5%
1951	2,560	+18.2%
1961	2,348	−8.3%

Year	Pop.	±%
1971	1,980	−15.7%
1981	2,015	+1.8%
1991	1,831	−9.1%
2001	1,716	−6.3%

Source: Data from ISTAT

== Twin towns and sister cities ==
- La Pobla de Segur, Spain
