= Vajont (film) =

2001 film by Renzo Martinelli

- Directed by: Renzo Martinelli
- Written by: Renzo Martinelli and Pietro Calderoni
- Produced by: Roberto Andreucci
- Cinematography: Blasco Giurato
- Edited by: Massimo Quaglia
- Music by: Francesco Sartori
- Release date: 19 October 2001
- Running time: 116 minutes

Vajont (Italian: Vajont - La diga del disonore) is a 2001 Italian disaster film directed by Renzo Martinelli. It is a dramatization of the Vajont Dam tsunami. For his performance Leo Gullotta won a Nastro d'Argento for Best Supporting Actor.

== Cast ==
- Michel Serrault: Carlo Semenza
- Daniel Auteuil: Alberico Biadene
- Laura Morante: Tina Merlin
- Jorge Perugorría: Geom. Olmo Montaner
- Mauro Corona: Pietro Corona
- Anita Caprioli: Ancilla Teza
- Leo Gullotta: Mario Pancini
- Philippe Leroy: Giorgio Dal Piaz
- Jean-Christophe Brétigniere: Edoardo Semenza
- Nicola Di Pinto: Francesco Penta
- Valerio Massimo Manfredi: President of the Court
