= Renzo Martinelli =

Italian film director and screenwriter (born 1948)

- Born: February 28, 1948 (age 78); Cesano Maderno, Italy
- Education: Master's in cinematography, the Catholic University
- Occupation: Film director
- Years active: 1994-present

Renzo Martinelli is an Italian film director and screenwriter. He directed more than ten films since 1994.

== Selected filmography ==
Year	Title	Notes
1994	Sarahsarà	A movie about Sara Gadalla Gubara, a disable swimmer who one the 1975 Capri-Napoli long-distance swimming race
1997	Porzûs	
2001	Vajont	
2003	Five Moons Square	
2008	Carnera: The Walking Mountain	
2009	Barbarossa	
2012	September Eleven 1683	
