= Longarone =

- Comune
- Comune di Longarone
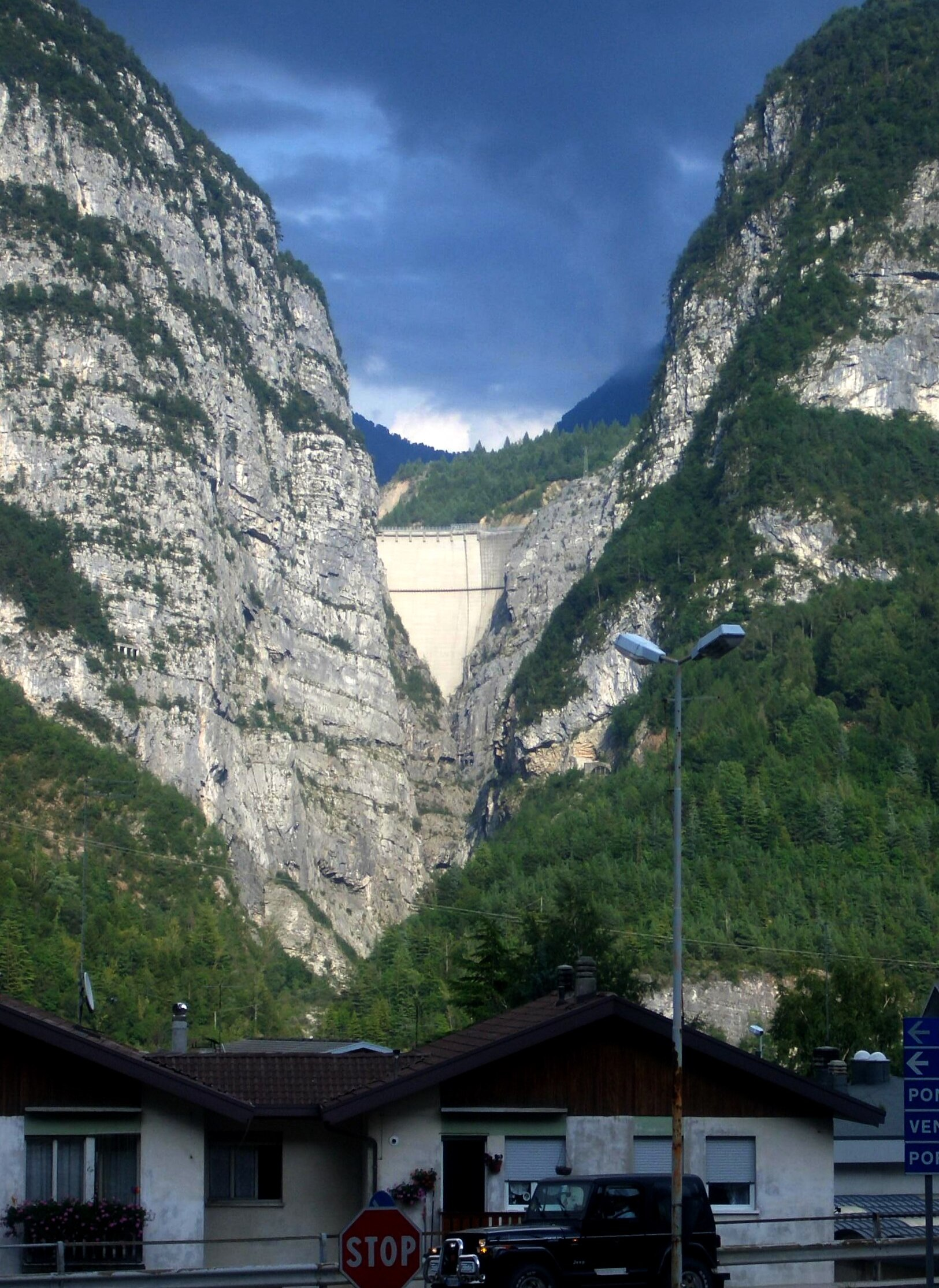
- The Vajont Dam as seen from Longarone today, showing approximately the top 60-70 metres of concrete.

- Coat of arms

- Location within Italy Location within Veneto
- Coordinates: 46°15′58″N 12°18′08″E
- Country: Italy
- Region: Veneto
- Province: Belluno (BL)
- Frazioni: Dogna, Faè, Fortogna, Igne, Pirago-Muda Maè, Provagna, Rivalta, Roggia, Soffranco

Government
  - Mayor: Roberto Padrin

Area
  - Total: 103 km^{2} (40 sq mi)
- Elevation: 473 m (1,552 ft)

Population (31 December 2008)
  - Total: 4,073
  - Density: 39.5/km^{2} (102/sq mi)
- Demonym: Longaronesi
- Time zone: UTC+1 (CET)
  - Summer (DST): UTC+2 (CEST)
- Postal code: 32013
- Dialing code: 0437
- ISTAT code: 025031
- Patron saint: Santa Maria
- Saint day: 8 December
- Website: Official website

Longarone is a town and comune on the banks of the Piave in the province of Belluno, in northeast Italy. It is situated 35 kilometres (22 miles) from Belluno.

4,642 people work all together in Longarone, which is 112.62% of the total population, with most actual inhabitants working within the village.

== Geography ==
The town is located on a road linking Belluno to Cortina d'Ampezzo, close to the borders of Veneto with Friuli-Venezia Giulia. Its nearest villages are Castellavazzo, Casso and Erto.

== History ==
There is evidence of Roman presence in the site of Longarone. In the regions of Fortogna and Pirago tombs have been discovered, and at Dogna, a burial site with coins, rings, bracelets, clay jars and a plaque dedicated to Asclepius, a Greco-Roman god (demigod) of medicine. Remains of a Roman road were also found.

But the early story of the city is not clear until the establishment of the municipality by Napoleon Bonaparte in 1806.

In the Middle Ages and modern era, the city was subject to the social and political events taking place in Belluno, being dominated by several groups and families, such as the Vescovi, the Ezzelino Romano in 1250, the Scala family in 1300, the families of Carrara and Visconti and the Venetian State domination in 1420.

Longarone was the site of a battle in World War I, in which a few companies of German troops led by Erwin Rommel successfully captured an entire Italian division of over 10,000, retreating after the Battle of Kobarid (Caporetto). Rommel was awarded his Pour le Mérite medal for this achievement.

== Dam disaster ==
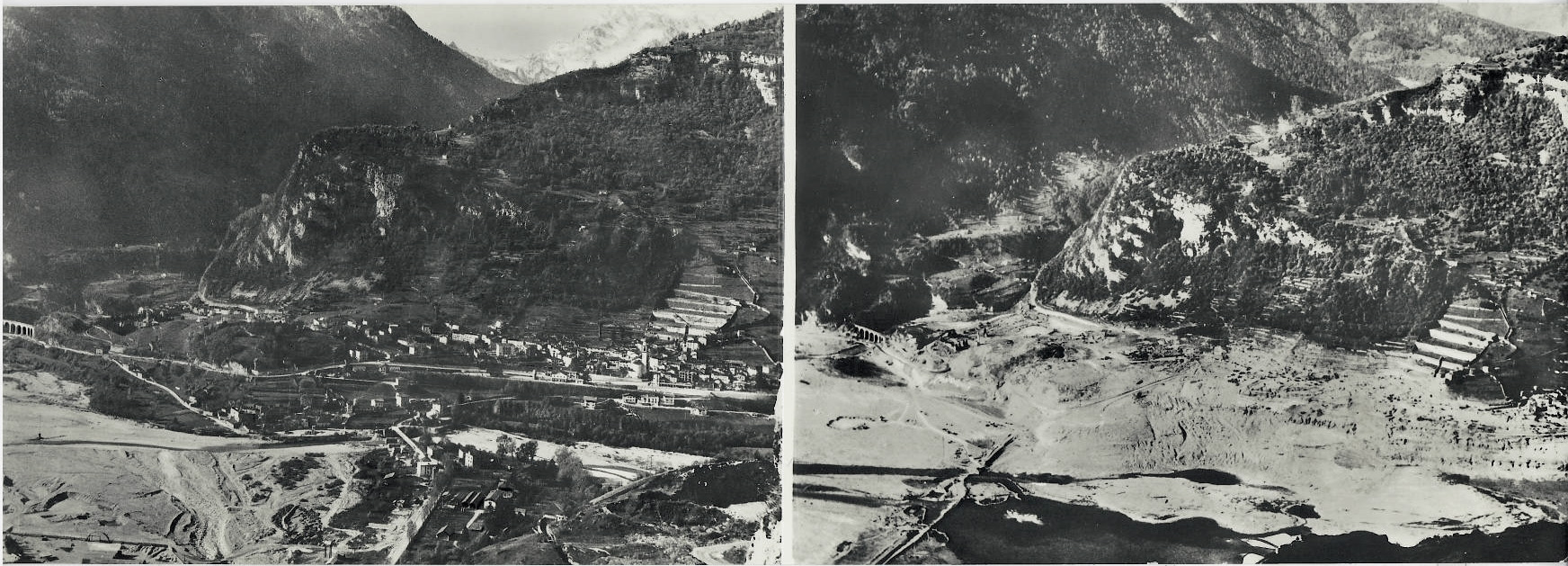
Pre- (1960) and post-flood Longarone

The village was destroyed in the Vajont Dam disaster on October 9, 1963, when a landslide from Monte Toc forced 270 million cubic metres (350×10^{6} cu yd; 9,500×10^{6} cu ft) of water over the top of the Vajont Dam. Longarone lay in the immediate path of the wave of mud and water which swept into the valley below. 1,917 villagers were killed.

Most of the city was destroyed, except the northern part of the city, the Palazzo Mazzolà and the townhall. The 18th century Santa Maria Assunta church was razed.

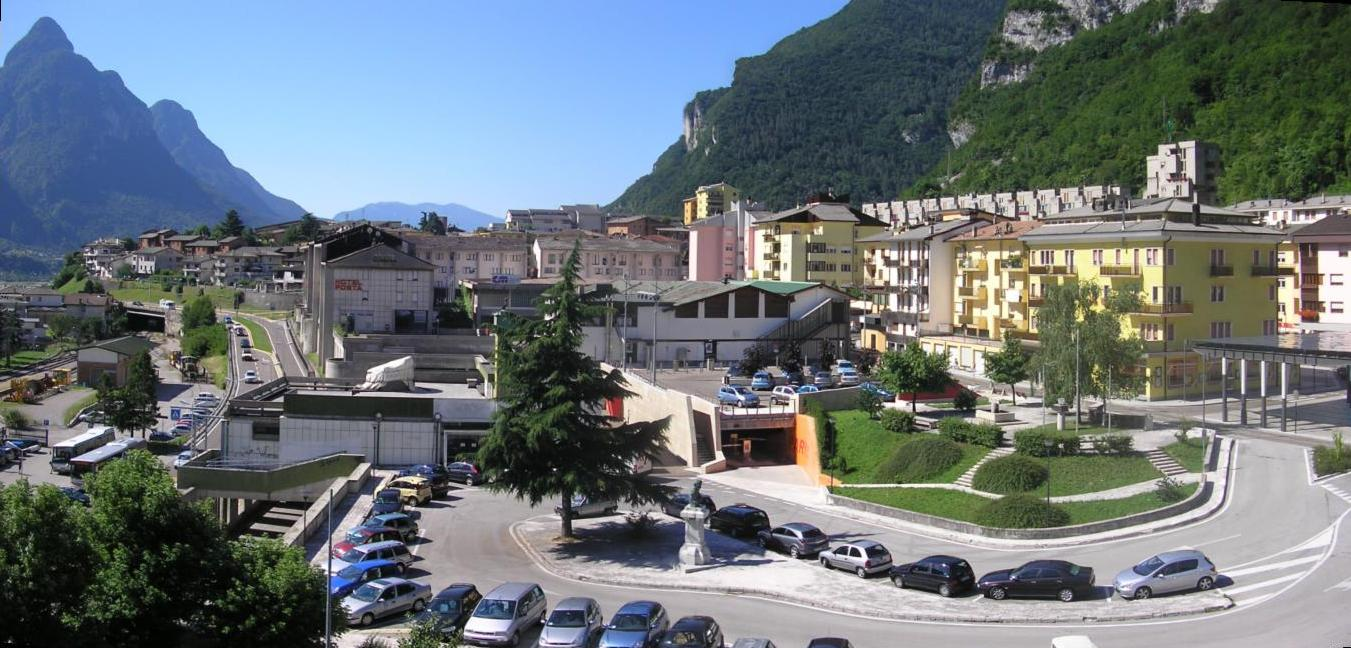
The new town

Longarone was rebuilt following the tragedy and is now once again a thriving community. The fortieth anniversary of the disaster was marked, in October 2003, by a commemorative ceremony in Longarone attended by President of the Republic Carlo Azeglio Ciampi.

== Economy ==
=== Eyewear production ===
From the 1960s to the 1990s, an eyewear district grew stronger in the Piave Valley (sometimes referred to as the Silicon Valley of optics) and Longarone became the headquarters of many eyewear manufacturers. Safilo had moved its main eyewear production plant in Longarone in the 1970s (until it was transferred to LVMH's Thélios in September 2023). Marcolin also moved its headquarters to Longarone in the 1970s (and opened a second production site in Longarone in 2015). Thélios opened its own eyewear manufacturing plant in Longarone in 2018.

== Buildings ==
The city's contemporary church, completed in 1975, was designed by the Italian architect Giovanni Michelucci. It was built on the same location where the Santa Maria Assunta church was standing up until the dam disaster razed it to the ground in 1963.

== Transport ==
The train station Longarone-Zoldo is served by trains to and from Venice.

== Twin towns ==
- Urussanga, Brazil
- Bagni di Lucca, Italy
