= List of tallest dams =

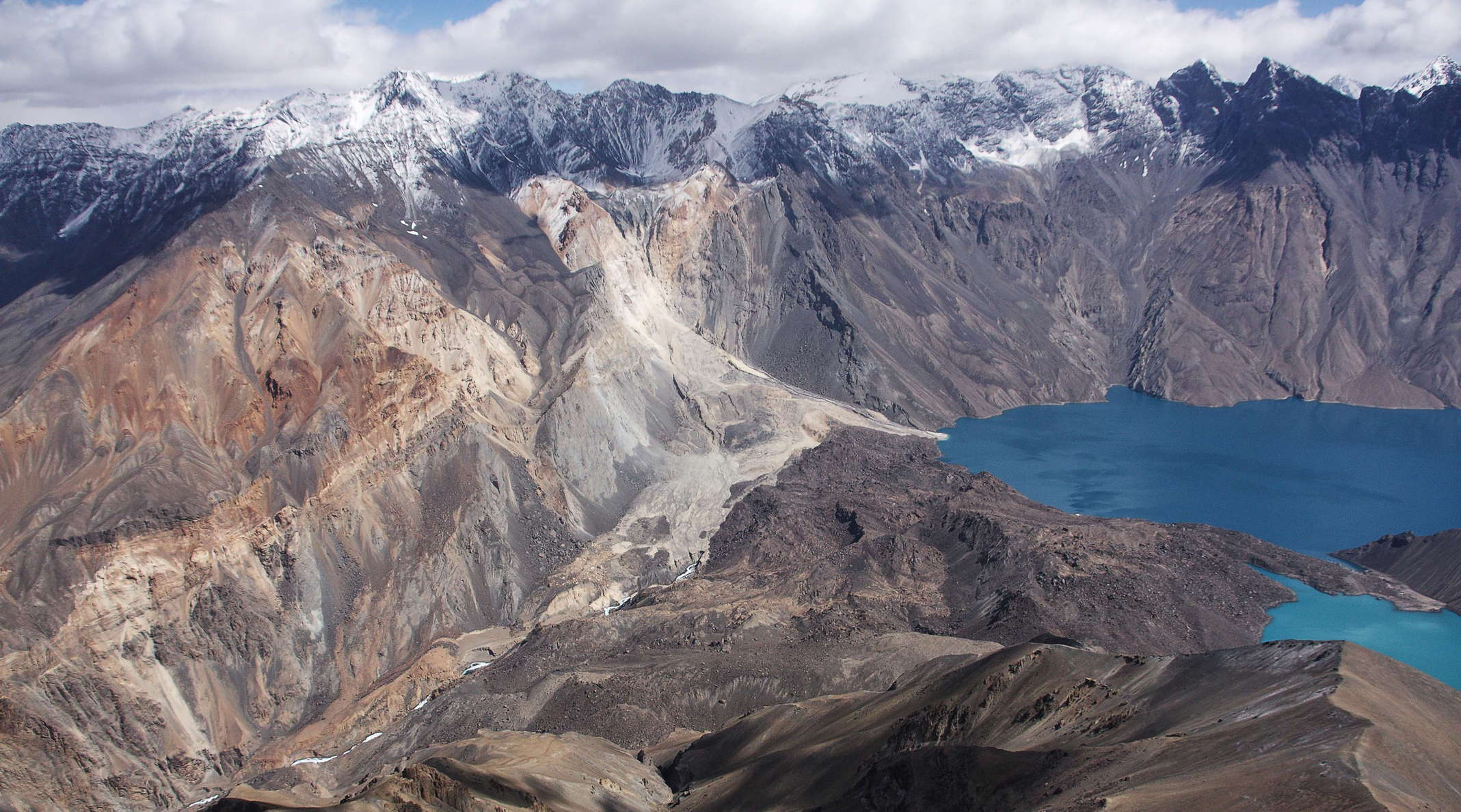
Usoi Dam, a natural dam. At 567 metres (1,860 ft) high, it is the tallest dam in the world.

This is a list of the tallest dams in the world above 150 m (492 ft) in height. The tallest man-made dam in the world is the Jinping-I dam, an arch dam in China at 305 m (1,001 ft). The tallest embankment dam and the second-tallest man-made dam in the world is the 300 m (984 ft) Nurek Dam in Tajikistan, built by the USSR. The tallest gravity dam is the 285-metre-high (935 ft) Grande Dixence Dam in Switzerland. The tallest natural dam, the 567 m (1,860 ft) Usoi Dam in Tajikistan, is 262 m (860 ft) higher than the tallest existing man-made dam.

== Existing ==
Name	Height	Type	Country	River	Completed
Usoi Dam	567 m (1,860 ft)	Landslide	Tajikistan	Murghab	1911
The Barrier	500 m (1,600 ft)	Lava	Canada	Rubble Creek	c. 11000 BCE
Shuangjiangkou Dam	312 m (1,024 ft)	Embankment, rock-fill	China	Dadu River	2026
Jinping-I Dam	305 m (1,001 ft)	Concrete arch	China	Yalong	2013
Nurek Dam	300 m (980 ft)	Embankment, earth-fill	Tajikistan	Vakhsh	1980
Lianghekou Dam	295 m (968 ft)	Embankment, concrete-face rock-fill	China	Yalong, Qingda and Xianshui River confluence	2021
Xiaowan Dam	292 m (958 ft)	Concrete arch	China	Lancang	2010
Baihetan Dam	289 m (948 ft)	Concrete arch	China	Jinsha River	2021
Xiluodu Dam	285.5 m (937 ft)	Concrete arch	China	Jinsha River	2013
Grande Dixence Dam	285 m (935 ft)	Concrete gravity	Switzerland	Dixence	1964
Enguri Dam	271.5 m (891 ft)	Concrete arch	Georgia	Enguri	1978
Yusufeli Dam	270 m (890 ft)	Concrete arch	Turkey	Çoruh River	2021
Vajont Dam (disused)	261.6 m (858 ft)	Concrete double-arch	Italy	Vajont	1959
Nuozhadu Dam	261.5 m (858 ft)	Embankment	China	Lancang River	2012
Manuel Moreno Torres (Chicoasén) Dam	261 m (856 ft)	Embankment, earth-fill	Mexico	Grijalva River	1980
Tehri Dam	260.5 m (855 ft)	Embankment, earth-fill	India	Bhagirathi	2006
Mauvoisin Dam	250 m (820 ft)	Concrete arch	Switzerland	Dranse de Bagnes	1957
Laxiwa Dam	250 m (820 ft)	Concrete arch	China	Yellow River	2009
Lake Waikaremoana Dam	250 m (820 ft)	Landslide	New Zealand	Waikaretāheke	c. 200 BCE
Deriner Dam	249 m (817 ft)	Concrete double-arch	Turkey	Çoruh River	2012
Alberto Lleras (Guavio) Dam	243 m (797 ft)	Embankment, rock-fill	Colombia	Guavio River	1989
Mica Dam	243 m (797 ft)	Embankment, earth-fill	Canada	Columbia River	1973
Gilgel Gibe III Dam	243 m (797 ft)	Roller-compacted concrete gravity	Ethiopia	Omo River	2015
Sayano Shushenskaya Dam	242 m (794 ft)	Concrete arch-gravity	Russia	Yenisei River	1985
Ertan Dam	240 m (790 ft)	Concrete arch-gravity	China	Yalong River	1999
Changheba Dam	240 m (790 ft)	Embankment, concrete-face rock-fill	China	Dadu River	2016
Wudongde Dam	240 m (790 ft)	Concrete gravity	China	Jinsha River	2021
La Esmeralda Dam	237 m (778 ft)	Embankment, rock-fill	Colombia	Bata	1976
Oroville Dam	234.7 m (770 ft)	Embankment, earth-fill	United States	Feather River	1968
El Cajón Dam	234 m (768 ft)	Concrete double-arch	Honduras	Humuya River	1985
Shuibuya Dam	233 m (764 ft)	Embankment, concrete-face rock-fill	China	Qingjiang	2008
Chirkey Dam	232.5 m (763 ft)	Concrete arch	Russia	Sulak River	1976
Goupitan Dam	232.5 m (763 ft)	Concrete double-arch	China	Wu Jiang River	2009
Karun-4 Dam	230 m (750 ft)	Concrete arch-gravity	Iran	Karun	2010
Bhakra Dam	226 m (741 ft)	Concrete gravity	India	Sutlej	1963
Luzzone Dam	225 m (738 ft)	Concrete arch	Switzerland	Lago di Luzzone	1963
Houziyan Dam	223.5 m (733 ft)	Embankment, concrete-face rock-fill	China	Dadu River	2016
Hoover Dam	221.46 m (726.6 ft)	Concrete arch-gravity	United States	Colorado River	1936
Jiangpinghe Dam	221 m (725 ft)	Embankment, concrete-face rock-fill	China	Loushui River	2012
Contra Dam	220 m (720 ft)	Concrete arch	Switzerland	Verzasca River	1965
La Yesca Dam	220 m (720 ft)	Embankment, concrete-face rock-fill	Mexico	Rio Grande de Santiago	2012
Mratinje Dam	220 m (720 ft)	Concrete arch-gravity	Montenegro	Piva	1976
Dworshak Dam	218.6 m (717 ft)	Concrete gravity	United States	NF Clearwater River	1973
Longtan Dam	216.5 m (710 ft)	Roller-compacted concrete gravity	China	Hongshui River	2009
Glen Canyon Dam	216.4 m (710 ft)	Concrete arch-gravity	United States	Colorado River	1966
Toktogul Dam	215 m (705 ft)	Concrete gravity	Kyrgyzstan	Naryn	1974
Daniel-Johnson Dam	214 m (702 ft)	Concrete multiple-arch gravity	Canada	Manicouagan River	1970
Maerdang Dam	211 m (692 ft)	Embankment, concrete-face rock-fill	China	Yellow River	2024
Dagangshan Dam	210 m (690 ft)	Concrete arch	China	Dadu River	2015
Keban Dam	210 m (690 ft)	Combined: rock-fill and concrete gravity	Turkey	Euphrates River	1974
Ermenek Dam	210 m (690 ft)	Concrete double-arch	Turkey	Göksu	2009
Irapé Dam	208 m (682 ft)	Embankment, rock-fill	Brazil	Jequitinhonha River	2006
Bakun Dam	205 m (673 ft)	Embankment, concrete-face rock-fill	Malaysia	Balui River	2011
Karun-3 Dam	205 m (673 ft)	Concrete arch-gravity	Iran	Karun River	2005
Zimapán Dam	203 m (666 ft)	Concrete arch-gravity	Mexico	Moctezuma River	1993
Dez Dam	203 m (666 ft)	Concrete arch-gravity	Iran	Dez River	1963
Huangdeng Dam	203 m (666 ft)	Concrete gravity	China	Lancang River	2018
Almendra Dam	202 m (663 ft)	Concrete arch	Spain	Tormes River	1970
Campos Novos Dam	202 m (663 ft)	Embankment, concrete-face rock-fill	Brazil	Canoas River	2006
Berke Dam	201 m (659 ft)	Concrete arch-gravity	Turkey	Ceyhan River	2001
Guangzhao Dam	200.5 m (658 ft)	Concrete gravity	China	Beipan River	2008
Shahid Abbaspour Dam (Karun 1)	200 m (660 ft)	Concrete double-arch	Iran	Karun River	1976
Kölnbrein Dam	200 m (660 ft)	Concrete double-arch gravity	Austria	Streams in upper Malta	1977
San Roque Dam	200 m (660 ft)	Embankment	Philippines	Agno River	2003
New Bullards Bar Dam	196.6 m (645 ft)	Concrete arch-gravity	United States	Yuba River	1969
Itaipu Dam	196 m (643 ft)	Concrete gravity	Brazil / Paraguay	Paraná River	1984
Altinkaya Dam	195 m (640 ft)	Embankment, rock-fill	Turkey	Kizil Irmak	1988
Boyabat Dam	195 m (640 ft)	Concrete gravity	Turkey	Kizilirmak River	2012
Kárahnjúkastífla Dam	193 m (633 ft)	Embankment, concrete-face rock-fill	Iceland	Jökulsá	2009
New Melones Dam	190.5 m (625 ft)	Embankment, earth/rock-fill	United States	Stanislaus River	1979
W.A.C. Bennett Dam	190.5 m (625 ft)	Embankment, earth-fill	Canada	Peace River	1968
Sogamoso Dam	190 m (620 ft)	Embankment, concrete-face rock-fill	Colombia	Sogamoso	2014
Arkun Dam	188 m (617 ft)	Embankment, earth-fill	Turkey	Çoruh River	2014
Miel 1 Dam	188 m (617 ft)	Roller-compacted concrete gravity	Colombia	Miel River	2002
Aguamilpa Dam	187 m (614 ft)	Embankment, concrete-face rock-fill	Mexico	Rio Grande de Santiago	1993
Kurobe Dam	186 m (610 ft)	Concrete arch-gravity	Japan	Kurobe River	1963
Pubugou Dam	186 m (610 ft)	Embankment, concrete-face rock-fill	China	Yalong River	2010
Zillergründl Dam	186 m (610 ft)	Concrete arch	Austria	Ziller	1986
Sanbanxi Dam	185.6 m (609 ft)	Embankment, concrete-face rock-fill	China	Yuanshui River	2006
Oymapinar Dam	185.5 m (609 ft)	Concrete arch	Turkey	Manavgat River	1984
Barra Grande Dam	185 m (607 ft)	Embankment, concrete-face rock-fill	Brazil	Pelotas River	2005
Katse Dam	185 m (607 ft)	Concrete double-arch	Lesotho	Malibamatšo River	1996
Tekeze Dam	189 m (620 ft)	Concrete double-arch	Ethiopia	Tekeze River	2009
Three Gorges Dam	181 m (594 ft)	Concrete gravity	China	Yangtze River	2008
Mossyrock Dam	184.7 m (606 ft)	Concrete arch-gravity	United States	Cowlitz River	1968
Shasta Dam	183.5 m (602 ft)	Concrete arch-gravity	United States	Sacramento River	1945
Techi Dam (Deji, Tachian)	181 m (594 ft)	Concrete arch-gravity	Taiwan	Dajia (Tachia)	1974
Artvin Dam	180 m (590 ft)	Concrete arch-gravity	Turkey	Çoruh River	2016
Tignes Dam	180 m (590 ft)	Concrete arch-gravity	France	Lac du Chevril	1952
Dartmouth Dam	180 m (590 ft)	Embankment, earth/rock-fill	Australia	Mitta Mitta River	1979
Emosson Dam	180 m (590 ft)	Concrete arch	Switzerland	Barberini	1973
Amir Kabir Dam	180 m (590 ft)	Concrete arch	Iran	Karaj	1961
Seimare Dam	180 m (590 ft)	Concrete arch, variable-radius	Iran	Seimare	2011
Piedra del Águila Dam	180 m (590 ft)	Concrete gravity	Argentina	Rio Limay	1993
Upper Gotvand Dam	180 m (590 ft)	Embankment, rock-fill	Iran	Karun	2012
Tupalang Dam	180 m (590 ft)	Embankment, rock-fill with clay-core	Uzbekistan	Tupalang River	2023
Hongjiadu Dam	179.5 m (589 ft)	Embankment, concrete-face rock-fill	China	Liuchong River	2005
Longyangxia Dam	178 m (584 ft)	Concrete arch-gravity	China	Yellow River	1992
Tianshengqiao Dam	178 m (584 ft)	Embankment, concrete-face rock-fill	China	Nanpan River	2000
El Cajón	178 m (584 ft)	Embankment, concrete-face rock-fill	Mexico	Rio Grande de Santiago	2007
New Don Pedro Dam	178 m (584 ft)	Embankment, earth-fill	United States	Tuolumne River	1971
Danjiangkou Dam	176.6 m (579 ft)	Concrete gravity	China	Han River	1973
Takase Dam	176 m (577 ft)	Embankment, rock-fill	Japan	Shinano	1978
Grand Ethiopian Renaissance Dam	155 m (509 ft)	Concrete gravity	Ethiopia	Blue Nile River	2024
Marun Dam	175 m (574 ft)	Embankment	Iran	Marun River	1998
Hasan Ugurlu Dam	175 m (574 ft)	Embankment, rock-fill	Turkey	Yesilirmak	1981
Karakaya Dam	173 m (568 ft)	Concrete arch-gravity	Turkey	Euphrates River	1987
Alpe Gera Dam	174 m (571 ft)	Concrete gravity	Italy	Cormor	1964
Revelstoke Dam	174 m (571 ft)	Concrete gravity	Canada	Columbia River	1984
Thissavros Dam	172 m (564 ft)	Embankment, rock-fill	Greece	Nestos	1996
Hungry Horse Dam	171.9 m (564 ft)	Concrete arch-gravity	United States	Flathead River	1953
Cahora Bassa Dam	171 m (561 ft)	Concrete arch-gravity	Mozambique	Zambezi River	1974
Denis-Perron Dam	171 m (561 ft)	Embankment, rock-fill	Canada	Sainte-Marguerite River	2002
Kajiwa Dam	171 m (561 ft)	Embankment, concrete-face rock-fill	China	Muli River	2014
Kığı Dam	170 m (560 ft)	Embankment, rock-fill	Turkey	Peri River	2006
Paute Dam	170 m (560 ft)	Concrete arch-gravity	Ecuador	Paute River	1983
Atatürk Dam	169 m (554 ft)	Embankment, rock-fill with clay-core	Turkey	Euphrates River	1992
Daryan Dam	169 m (554 ft)	Embankment, rock-fill	Iran	Sirvan River	2015
Guandi Dam	168 m (551 ft)	Concrete gravity	China	Yalong River	2012
Seven Oaks Dam	168 m (551 ft)	Embankment, earth/rock-fill	United States	Santa Ana River	2000
Dongfeng Dam	168 m (551 ft)	Concrete arch	China	Wu	1995
Gura Apelor Dam	168 m (551 ft)	Embankment, rock-fill	Romania	Raul Mare	1986
Bruno Creek Tailings Dam	168 m (551 ft)	Embankment, earth-fill	United States	Bruno Creek	1983
Idukki Dam	168 m (551 ft)	Concrete arch	India	Periyar	1973
Charvak Dam	168 m (551 ft)	Embankment, earth/rock-fill	Uzbekistan	Chirchik	1970
Grand Coulee Dam	167.6 m (550 ft)	Concrete gravity	United States	Columbia River	1942
Koldam Dam	167 m (548 ft)	Embankment, rock-fill	India	Sutlej	2015
Fierza Dam (Fierze)	167 m (548 ft)	Embankment, rock-fill	Albania	Drin River	1978
Silvan Dam	166.5 m (546 ft)	Embankment, rock-fill	Turkey	Batman River	2022
Mazar Dam	166 m (545 ft)	Embankment, concrete-face rock-fill	Ecuador	Paute River	2010
Vidraru Dam	166 m (545 ft)	Concrete arch	Romania	Arges	1966
Kremasta Dam	165 m (541 ft)	Embankment, earth-fill	Greece	Achelous River	1965
Thomson Dam	165 m (541 ft)	Embankment, earth-fill	Australia	Thomson River	1983
Wujiangdu Dam	165 m (541 ft)	Concrete arch-gravity	China	Wujiang River	1982
Quxue Dam	164.2 m (539 ft)	Embankment, rock-fill	China	Shoqu River	2016
Trinity Dam	164 m (538 ft)	Embankment, earth-fill	United States	Trinity River	1960
Masjed Soleyman Dam	164 m (538 ft)	Embankment, concrete-face rock-fill with clay-core	Iran	Karun	2002
Sardar Sarovar Dam	163 m (535 ft)	Concrete gravity	India	Narmada	2017
Guri Dam	162 m (531 ft)	Concrete gravity	Venezuela	Río Caroní	1969/1986
Talbingo Dam	162 m (531 ft)	Embankment, earth-fill	Australia	Tumut River	1971
Huites Dam	162 m (531 ft)	Concrete arch-gravity	Mexico	Fuerte	1995
Robert-Bourassa Dam	162 m (531 ft)	Embankment, earth-fill	Canada	La Grande River	1979
Tankeng Dam	162 m (531 ft)	Embankment, concrete-face rock-fill	China	Ou River	2008
Tokuyama Dam	161 m (528 ft)	Embankment	Japan	Ibi River	2008
Xiangjiaba Dam	161 m (528 ft)	Concrete gravity	China	Jinsha River	2012
Bento Munhoz da Rocha Netto Dam	160 m (520 ft)	Embankment, concrete-face rock-fill	Brazil	Iguazu River	1980
Grand'Maison Dam	160 m (520 ft)	Embankment, rock-fill	France	Eau d'Olle	1985
Jinanqiao Dam	160 m (520 ft)	Concrete gravity	China	Jinsha River	2010
Los Leones Dam	160 m (520 ft)	Embankment, earth-fill	Chile	Los Leones	1999
Ranjit Sagar Dam	160 m (520 ft)	Embankment	India	Ravi River	2001
Ross Dam	160 m (520 ft)	Concrete thin-arch	United States	Skagit River	1949
Yellowtail Dam	160 m (520 ft)	Concrete arch-gravity	United States	Bighorn River	1967
Guanyinyan Dam	159 m (522 ft)	Roller-compacted concrete gravity	China	Jinsha River	2014
Pai Querê Dam	158 m (518 ft)	Embankment, concrete-face rock-fill	Brazil	Pelotas River	
Cougar Dam	158 m (518 ft)	Embankment, rock-fill	United States	McKenzie River	1964
Emborcação Dam	158 m (518 ft)	Embankment, earth-fill	Brazil	Rio Paranaíba	1983
Naramata Dam	158 m (518 ft)	Embankment, rock-fill	Japan	Naramata	1990
Pangduo Dam	158 m (518 ft)	Embankment, rock-fill	China	Lhasa River	2013
Rudbar Lorestan Dam	158 m (518 ft)	Concrete gravity	Iran	Rudbar River	2016
Geheyan Dam	157 m (515 ft)	Concrete arch	China	Qingjiang River	
Dongjiang Dam	157 m (515 ft)	Concrete arch	China	Lishui River	
Jilintai I Dam	157 m (515 ft)	Embankment, concrete-face rock-fill	China	Kashi River	
Okutadami Dam	157 m (515 ft)	Concrete gravity	Japan	Tadami River	
Speccheri Dam	157 m (515 ft)	Concrete arch	Italy	Vallarsa	
Malutang Dam	156 m (512 ft)	Embankment, concrete-face rock-fill	China	Panlong River	
Miyagase Dam	156 m (512 ft)	Concrete gravity	Japan	Nakatsu River	
Shatuo Dam	156 m (512 ft)	Concrete arch	China	Wu River	2009
Nukui Dam	156 m (512 ft)	Concrete arch	Japan	Takayama	
Swift Dam	156 m (512 ft)	Embankment, earth-fill	United States	Lewis River	1958
Urayama	156 m (512 ft)	Roller-compacted concrete gravity	Japan	Arakawa River	
Zeuzier Dam	156 m (512 ft)	Concrete arch	Switzerland	Lienne	1957
Zipingpu Dam	156 m (512 ft)	Embankment	China	Min River	
Nagawado Dam (Tepco Upper Azumi)	155.5 m (510 ft)	Concrete arch	Japan	Azumi River	
Sakuma Dam	155.5 m (510 ft)	Concrete gravity	Japan	Tenryū River	
Bashan Dam	155 m (509 ft)	Embankment, concrete-face rock-fill	China	Ren River	
Lijiaxia Dam	155 m (509 ft)	Concrete arch-gravity	China	Yellow River	
Göscheneralp Dam	155 m (509 ft)	Embankment, earth-fill	Switzerland	Göschenerreuss	1965
Place Moulin Dam	155 m (509 ft)	Concrete arch	Italy	Buthier	1965
Kenyir Dam	155 m (509 ft)	Embankment	Malaysia	Kenyir	1985
Ralco Dam	155 m (509 ft)	Roller-compacted concrete gravity	Chile	Biobío River	
Turkwel Dam	155 m (509 ft)	Concrete arch	Kenya	Turkwel	1991
Liyuan Dam	155 m (509 ft)	Embankment, concrete-face rock-fill	China	Jinsha River	
Bhumibol Dam	154 m (505 ft)	Concrete arch	Thailand	Ping River	1964
Serra da Mesa Dam	154 m (505 ft)	Embankment	Brazil	Tocantins	
Xiaolangdi Dam	154 m (505 ft)	Embankment, rock-fill	China	Yellow River	
Gepatsch Dam	153 m (502 ft)	Embankment, rock-fill	Austria	Faggenbach, Inn River	1964
Curnera Dam	153 m (502 ft)	Concrete arch	Switzerland	Curnera	1966
Santa Giustina Dam	153 m (502 ft)	Concrete arch	Italy	Noce	
Tedorigawa Dam	153 m (502 ft)	Embankment	Japan	Tedori	
Flaming Gorge Dam	153 m (502 ft)	Concrete thin-arch	United States	Green River	1964
Torul Dam	152 m (499 ft)	Embankment, concrete-face rock-fill	Turkey	Harşit River	2007
Menzelet Dam	151 m (495 ft)	Embankment	Turkey	Ceyhan River	1989
Zervreila Dam	151 m (495 ft)	Concrete arch	Switzerland	Valser Rhine	1957
Porce III Dam	151 m (495 ft)	Embankment, concrete-face rock-fill	Colombia	Porce	
New Exchequer Dam	150 m (490 ft)	Embankment, concrete-face rock-fill	United States	Merced River	1967
Messochora Dam	150 m (490 ft)	Embankment, concrete-face rock-fill	Greece	Achelous River	2001
Roselend Dam	150 m (490 ft)	Concrete gravity-arch-buttress	France	Roselend	1962
Canelles Dam	150 m (490 ft)	Concrete arch	Spain	Noguera Ribagorzana	
Dongjing Dam	150 m (490 ft)	Embankment, concrete-face rock-fill	China	Beipan River	
Moglicë Dam	150 m (490 ft)	Embankment, rock-fill	Albania	Devoll	2019
Upper Kaleköy Dam	150 m (490 ft)	Concrete gravity	Turkey	Murat River	2018
Yangqu Dam	150 m (490 ft)	Embankment, concrete-face rock-fill	China	Yellow River	2016

== Under construction ==
Name	Height	Type	Country	River
Rogun Dam	335 m (1,099 ft)	Embankment	Tajikistan	Vakhsh River
Bakhtiari Dam	325 m (1,066 ft)	Concrete arch	Iran	Bakhtiari River
Brushy Fork Tailings Dam	290.8 m (954 ft)	Embankment	United States	Brushy Fork
Dibang Dam	278 m (912 ft)	Concrete gravity	India	Dibang River
Diamer-Bhasha Dam	272 m (892 ft)	Roller-compacted concrete gravity	Pakistan	River Indus
Dasu Dam	242 m (794 ft)	Roller-compacted concrete gravity	Pakistan	River Indus
Antamina Tailings Dam	240 m (790 ft)	Embankment, concrete-face rock-fill	Peru	Ayash River
Kishau Dam	236 m (774 ft)	Concrete gravity	India	Tons River
Bekhme Dam	230 m (750 ft)	Embankment, rock-fill	Iraq	Great Zab
Tasang Dam	228 m (748 ft)	Embankment, concrete-face rock-fill	Myanmar	Salween River
Ituango Dam	225 m (738 ft)	Embankment, earth-fill	Colombia	Cauca River
Mohmand Dam	213 m (699 ft)	Embankment, concrete-face rock-fill	Pakistan	Swat River
Khersan-3 Dam	195 m (640 ft)	Concrete arch, variable-radius	Iran	Khersan River
Lakhwar Dam	192 m (630 ft)	Concrete gravity	India	Yamuna River
Pskem Dam	195 m (640 ft)	Embankment, rock-fill with concrete-core	Uzbekistan	Pskem
Koysha Dam	180 m (590 ft)	Roller-compacted concrete gravity	Ethiopia	Omo River
Sykia Dam	170 m (560 ft)	Embankment, earth-fill	Greece	Achelous River
Aksu Dam	155 m (509 ft)	Embankment, rock-fill	Turkey	Çoruh River

== Gallery ==
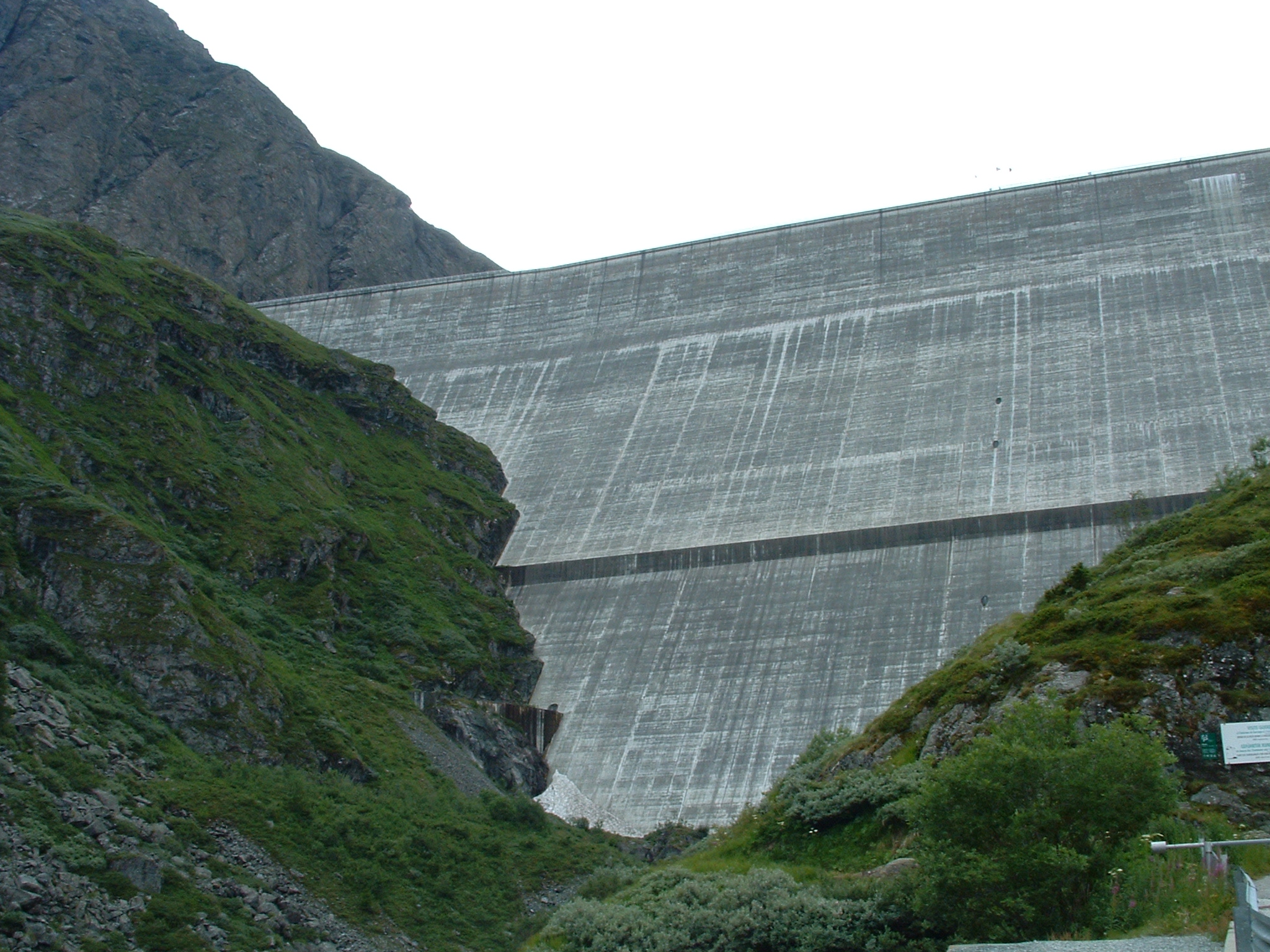
The Grande Dixence Dam in Switzerland

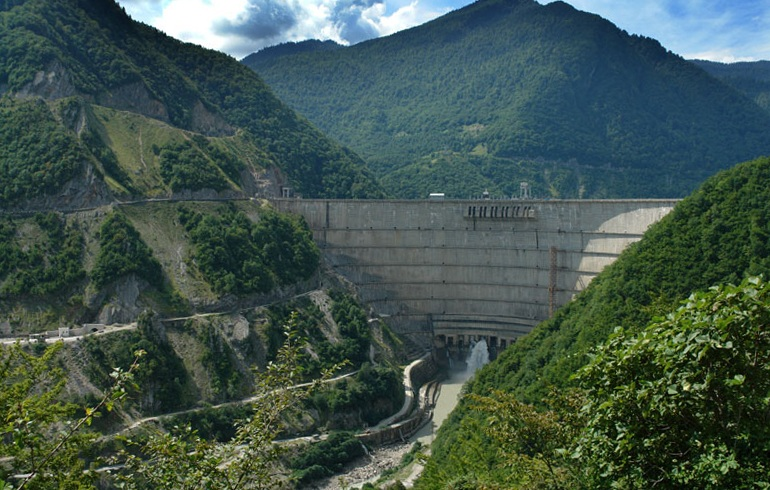
The Inguri Dam in Georgia

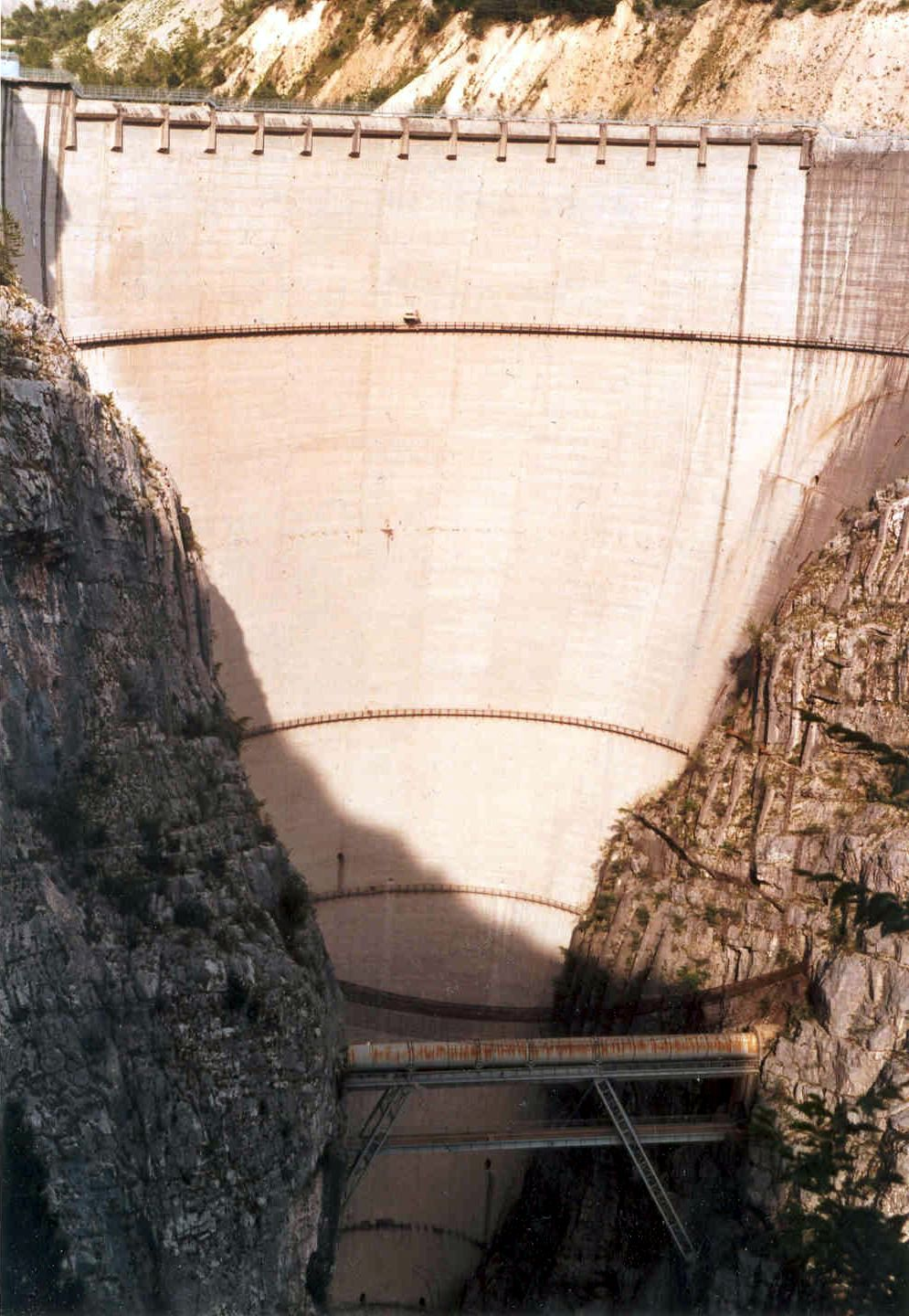
The Vajont Dam in Italy

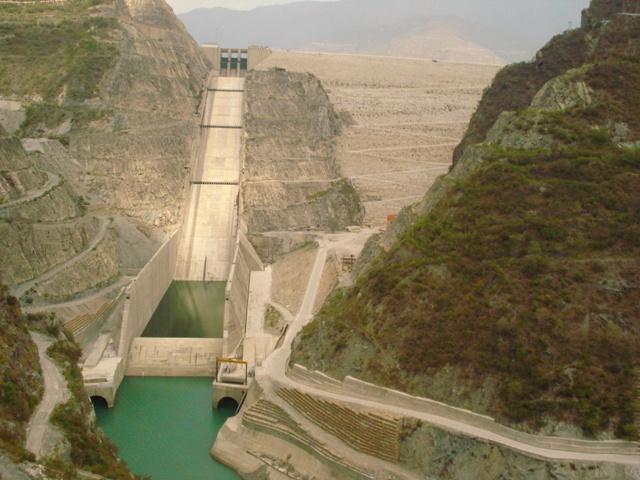
The Tehri Dam in India

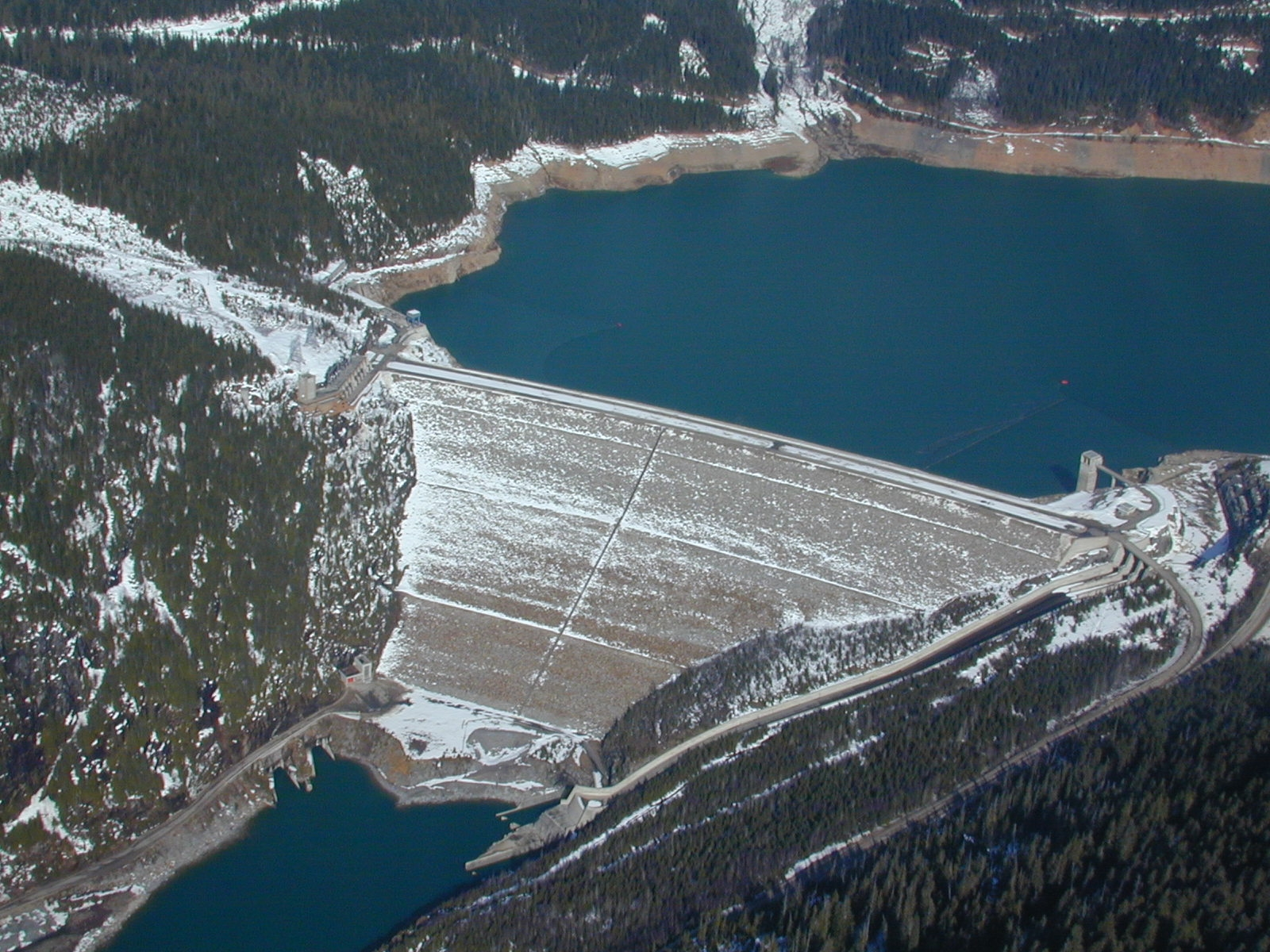
The Mica Dam in Canada

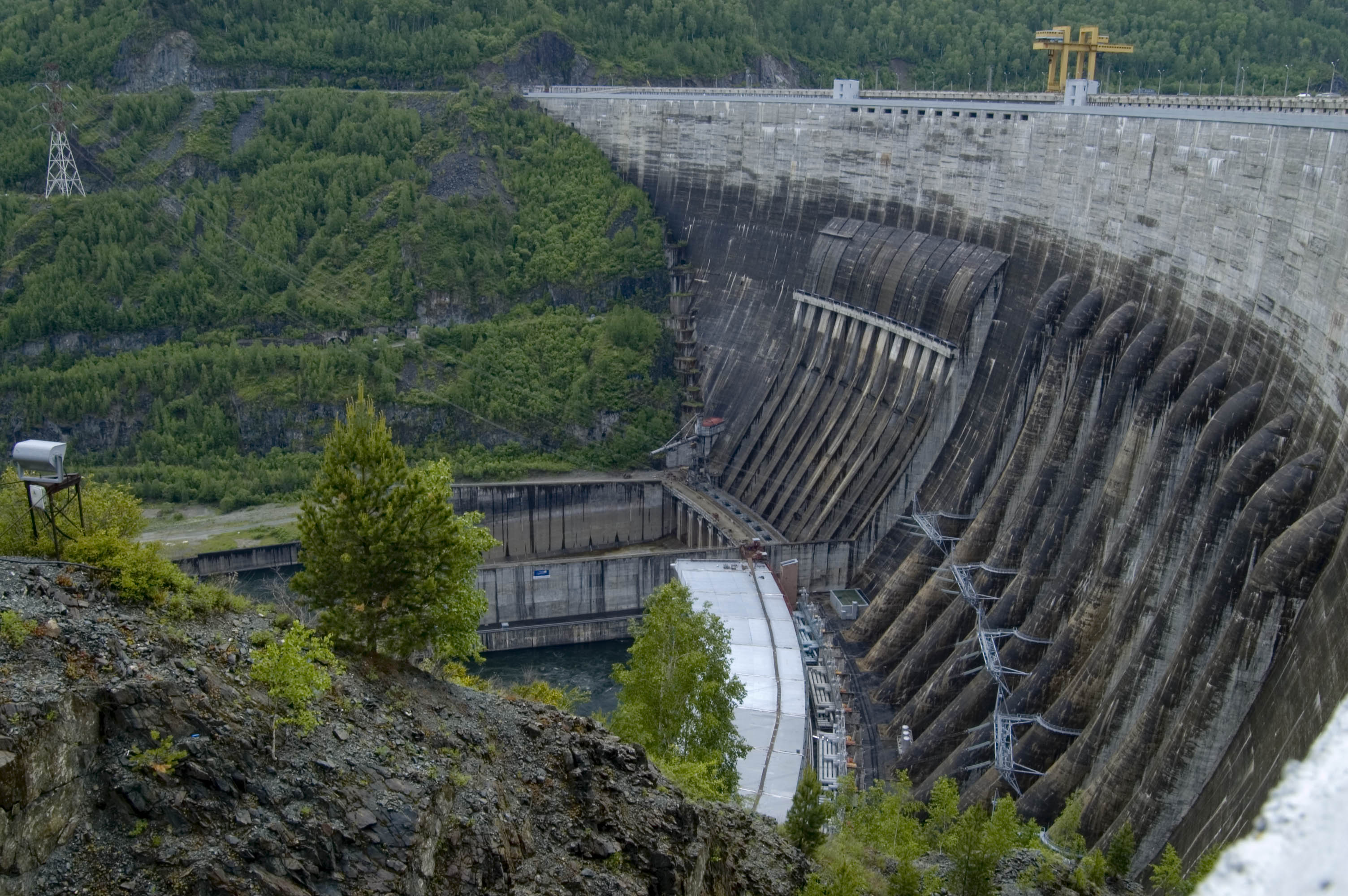
The Sayano Shushenskaya Dam in Russia

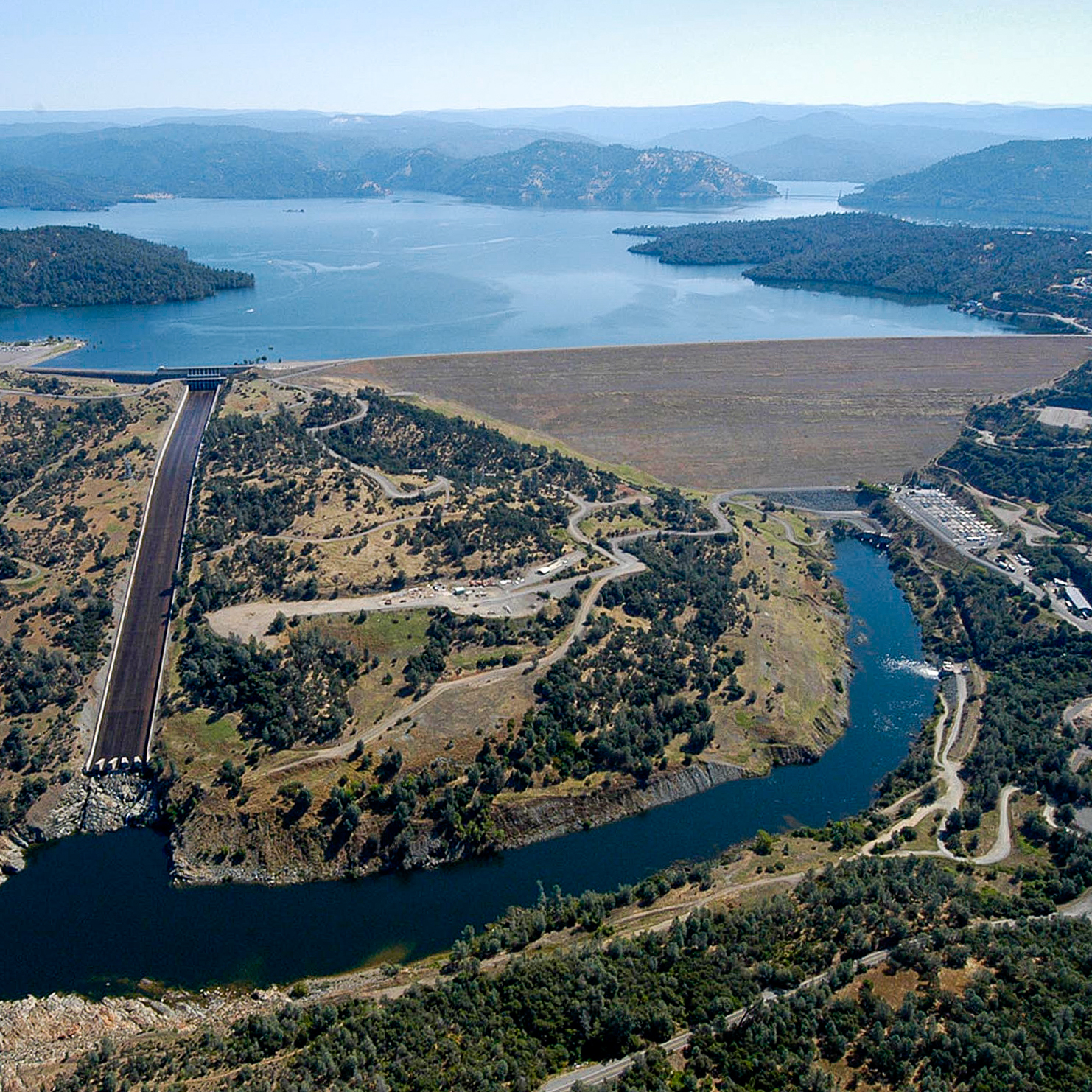
The Oroville Dam in the United States

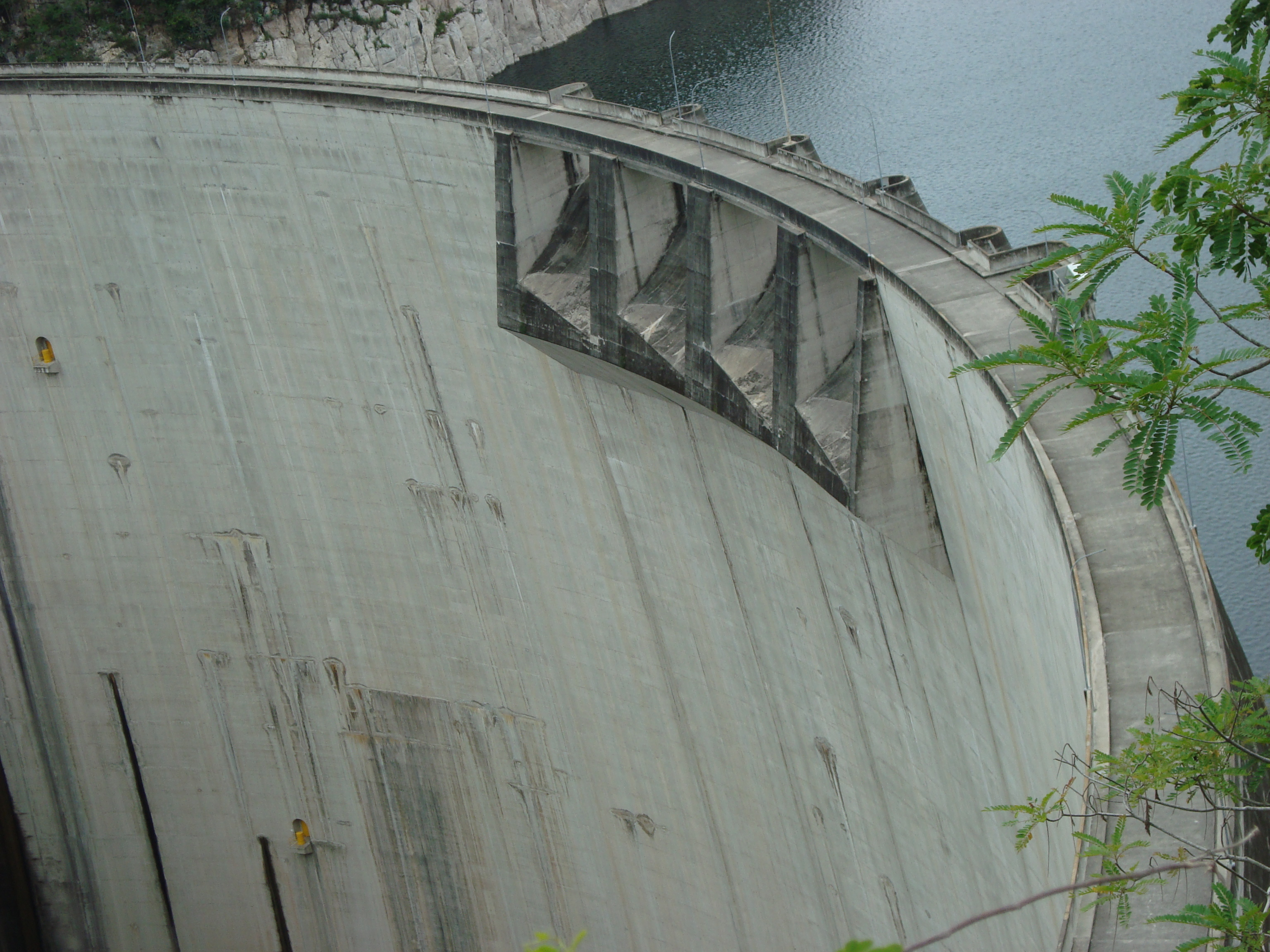
The El Cajón Dam in Honduras

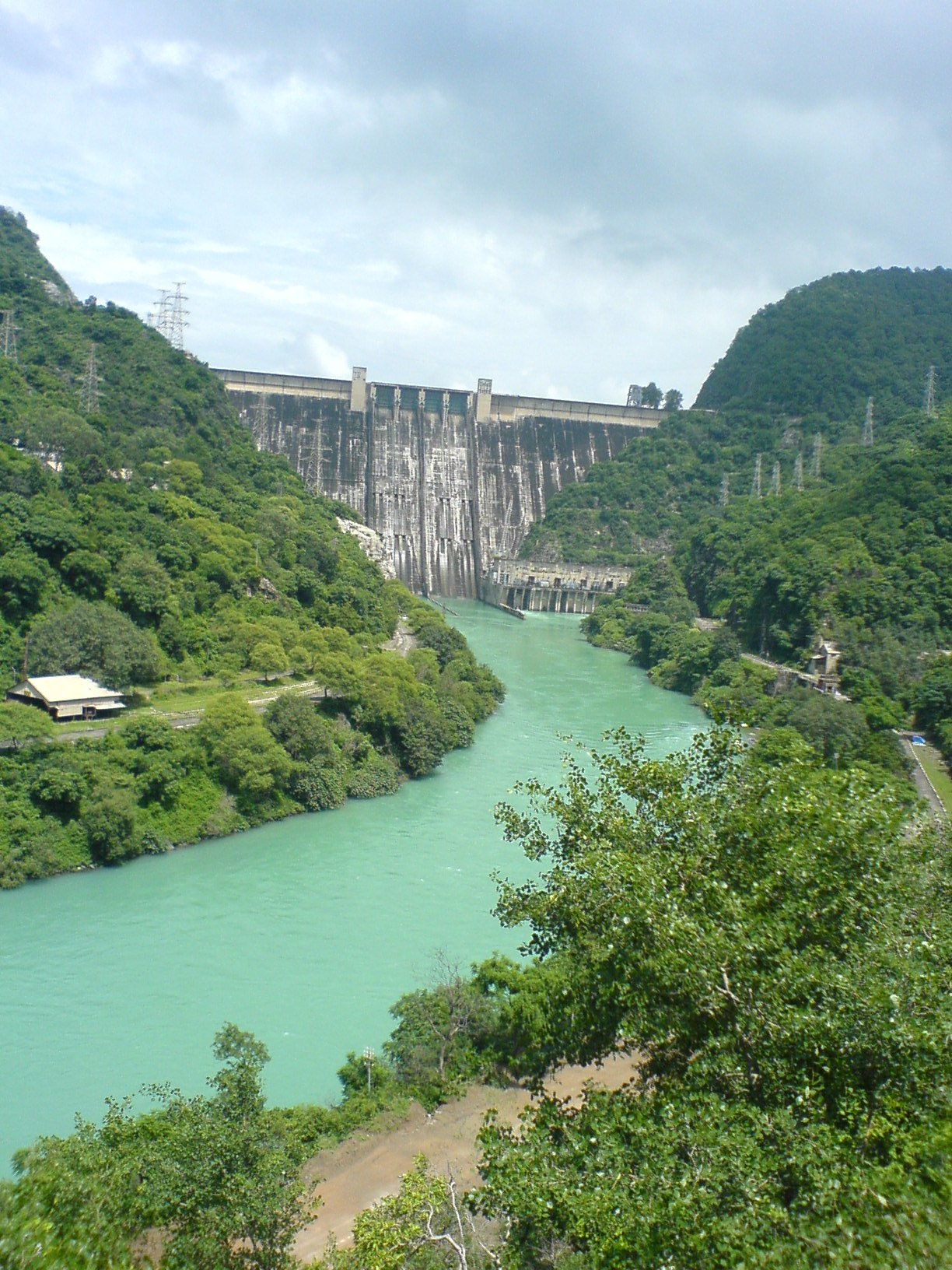
The Bhakra Dam in India

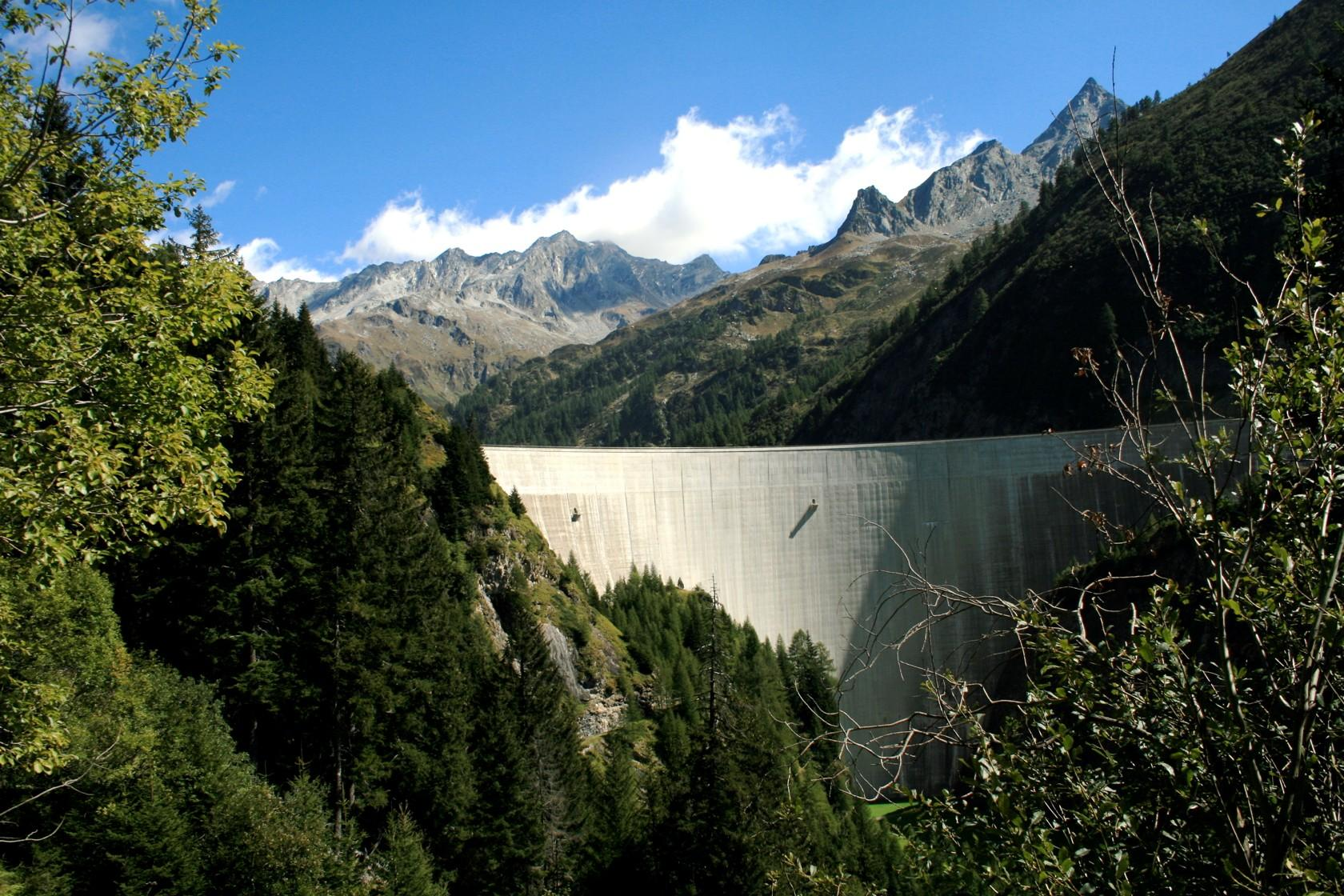
The Luzzone Dam in Switzerland

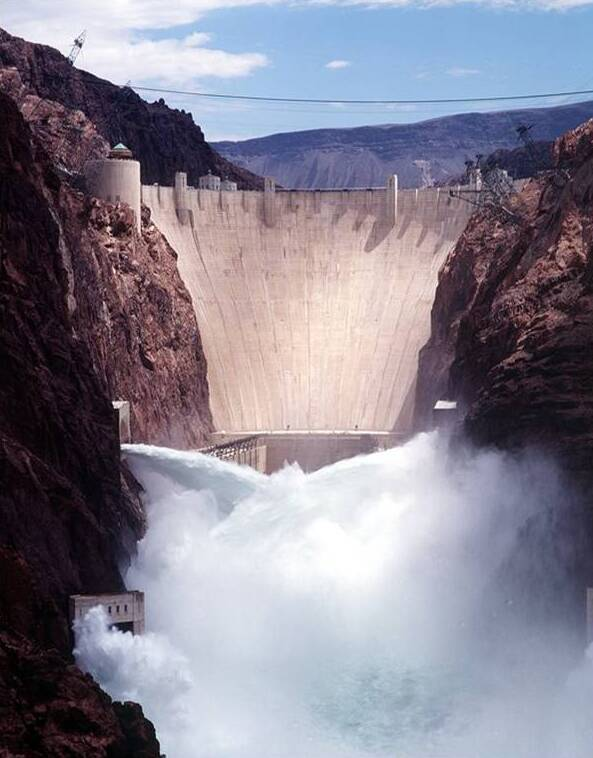
The Hoover Dam in the United States

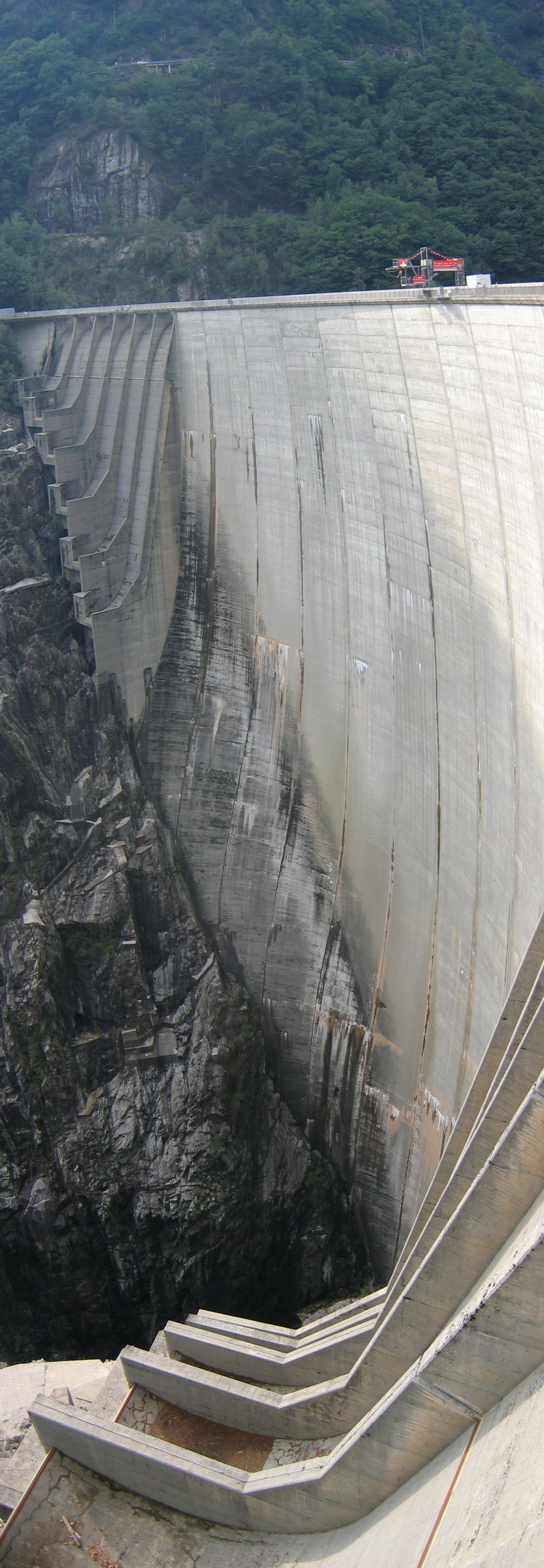
The Verzasca Dam in Switzerland

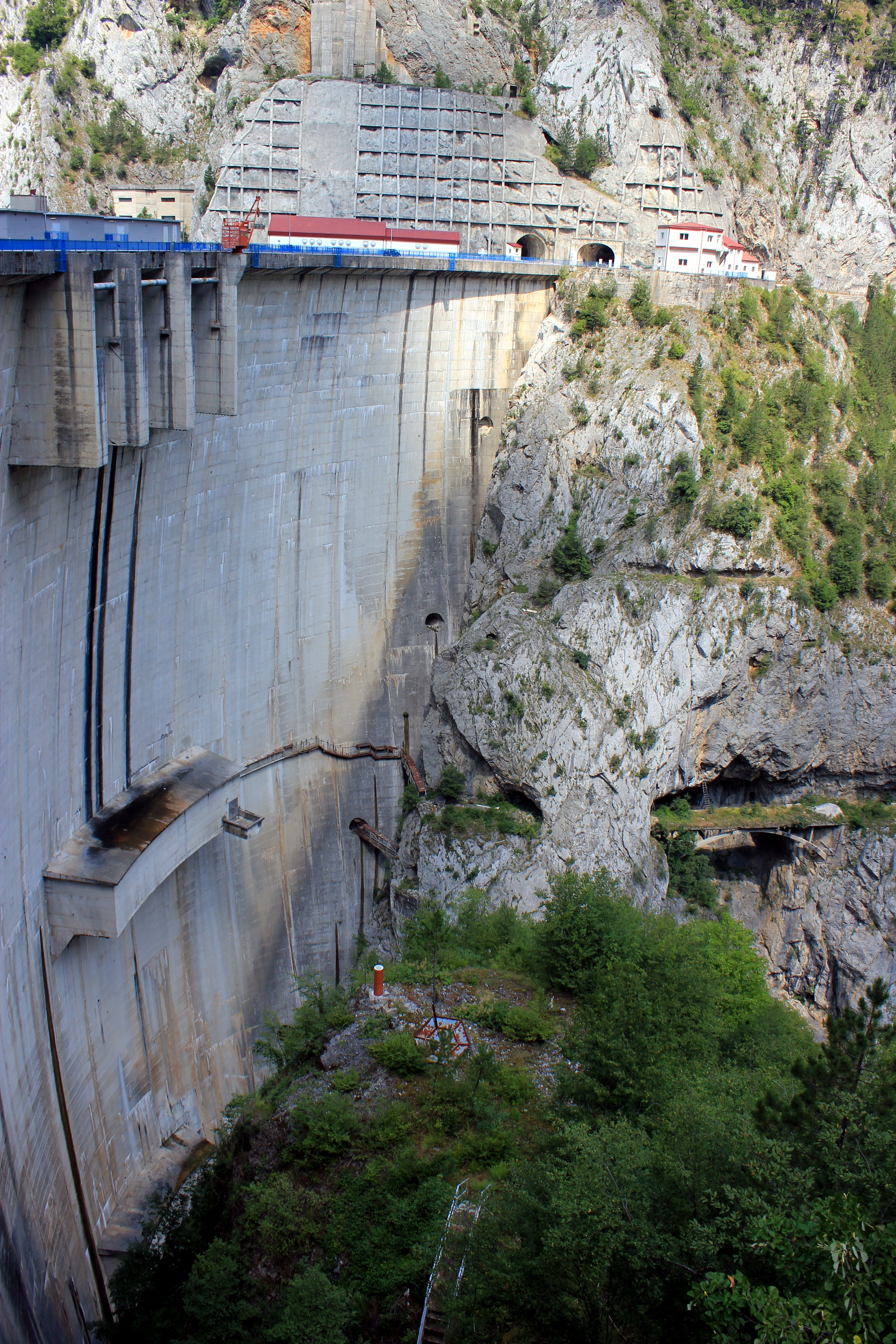
The Mratinje Dam in Montenegro

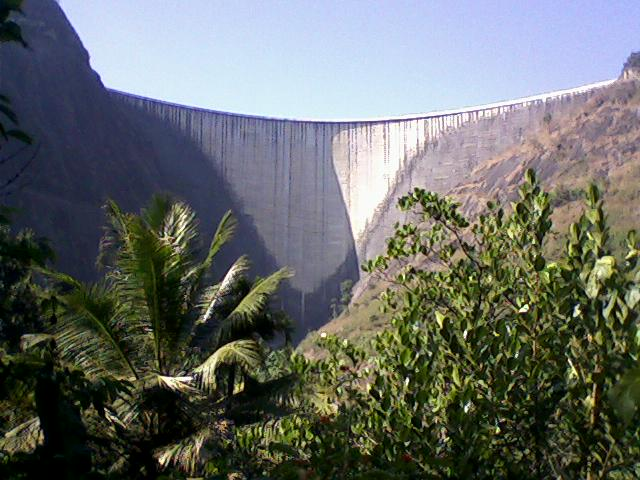
The Idukki Dam in India

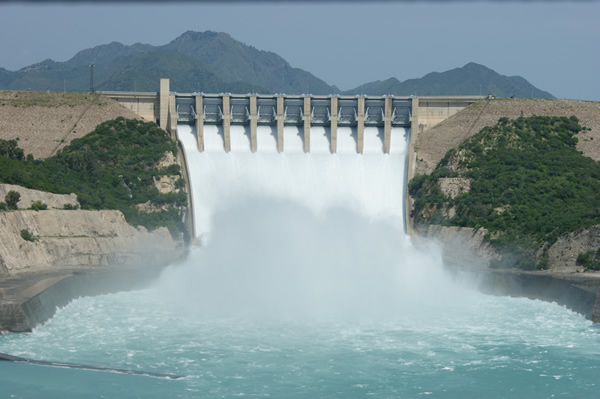
The Tarbela Dam in Pakistan

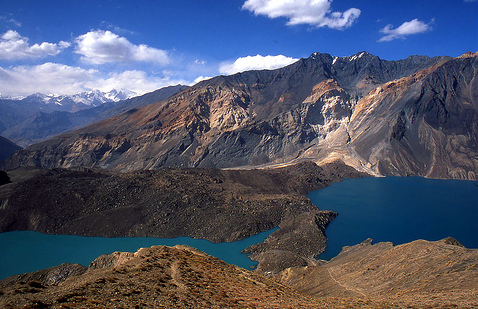
The upstream face of Usoi Dam in Tajikistan

== See also ==
- List of tallest dams in China
- List of tallest dams in Switzerland
- List of tallest dams in the United States

== Notes ==
- A 300m and 280m tall design under consideration
- Non-realized project of Soviet-era
- Construction stopped as a result of Gulf War
