= Campos Novos Dam =

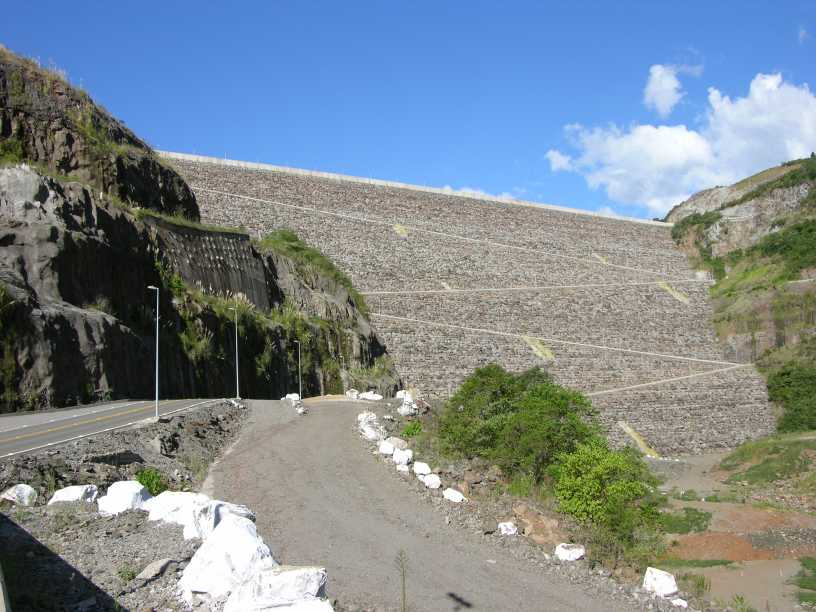

- Location within Brazil
- Official name: Barragem de Campos Novos
- Location: Campos Novos, SC, Brazil
- Coordinates: 27°36′15″S 51°19′35″W
- Construction began: August 2001
- Opening date: July 2006
- Construction cost: US$671 million
- Operator: Enercan

Dam and spillways
- Type of dam: Rock-fill dam
- Impounds: Canoas River
- Height: 202 m (663 ft)
- Length: 600 m (2,000 ft)

Power Station
- Installed capacity: 880 MW (1,180,000 hp)

The Campos Novos Dam (also known as Barragem de Campos Novos locally) is a hydroelectric dam in the Santa Catarina state in southern Brazil. In 2006, at 200 metres (660 ft) dam height, it was regarded as the third highest dam of this type (concrete-faced rock fill dam or CFRD) in the world, but, in June 2006, the water which it held back ran out following a break in the dam wall.

Built at a cost of US$671 million, it is located on the Canoas River, Brazil. It is part of a hydro-electric complex intended to provide 880 MW (1,180,000 hp). A second dam is below this one, and together they can hold a little more than 2 cubic kilometers of water.

== Ownership and construction ==
Campos Novos' 35 years build and operate concession was awarded in 1998. It is owned by Campos Novos Energia S.A. ("Enercan"), a consortium made up of Brazilian power company CPFL Energia (formerly Companhia Paulista de Força e Luz) with 48.7%, Brazilian aluminum maker Companhia Brasileira de Aluminio (CBA) with 22.7%, metallurgy company Companhia Niquel Tocantins (CNT) with 20%, state-controlled companies Companhia Estadual de Energia Elétrica (CEEE) with 6.5% and Centrais Elétricas de Santa Catarina S.A. ("Celesc") with 2%.

The dam builder was a consortium led by Brazilian construction company Camargo Corrêa and engineering consultants Engevix. Funding is by the Inter-American Development Bank and state-owned Brazilian Development Bank.

== Cracks ==
A major break caused the water to begin to run out after a tunnel collapsed on 20 June 2006. The exact reasons for the cracking were unknown in July 2006, however it has been revealed that patches were begun on another tunnel in October 2005 before the recent tunnel failure.

Since the dam failure, a full inquiry for the reasons behind the cracks has been done, and a time-line of the dam's progression towards failure has been completed. Following this discovery, hidden by the partners of the project, it appeared that these companies had maltreated the local populations. An investigation into the human rights violations was launched by United Nations Organisation.

Camargo Corrêa re-plugged the tunnels in November 2006 and the reservoir was refilled by 1 March 2007. The last of the three generators went on-line on 30 April 2007.

== Gallery ==
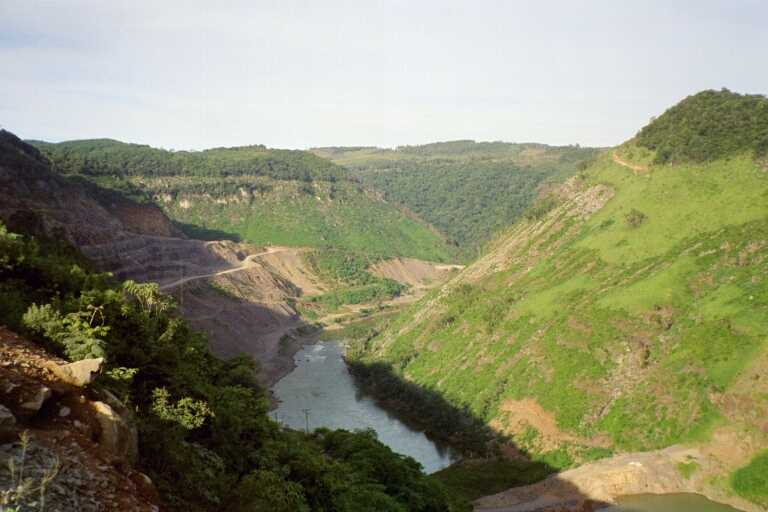
Detour of the Canoas River, April 2005

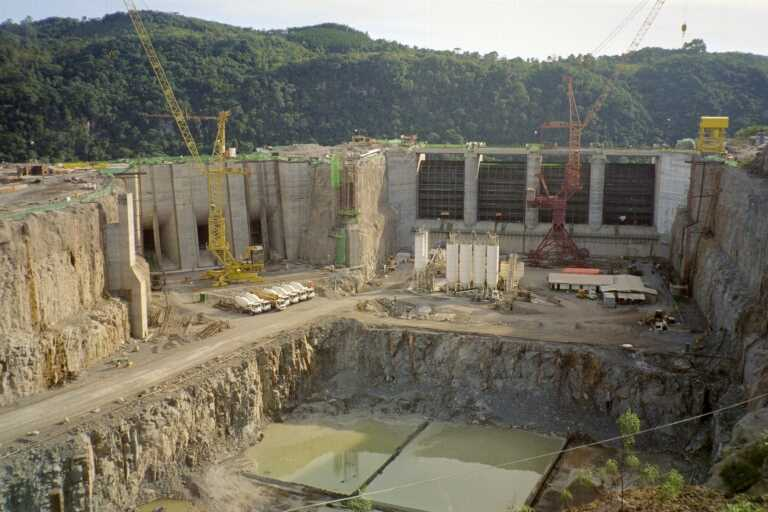
3 pipes on the left to the turbines, 4 water outlets on the right, April 2005

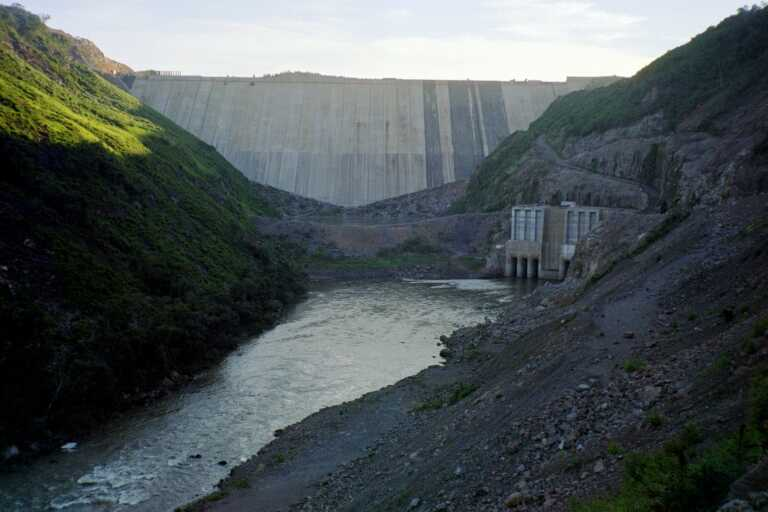
inside the future storage lake, 3 months before damming

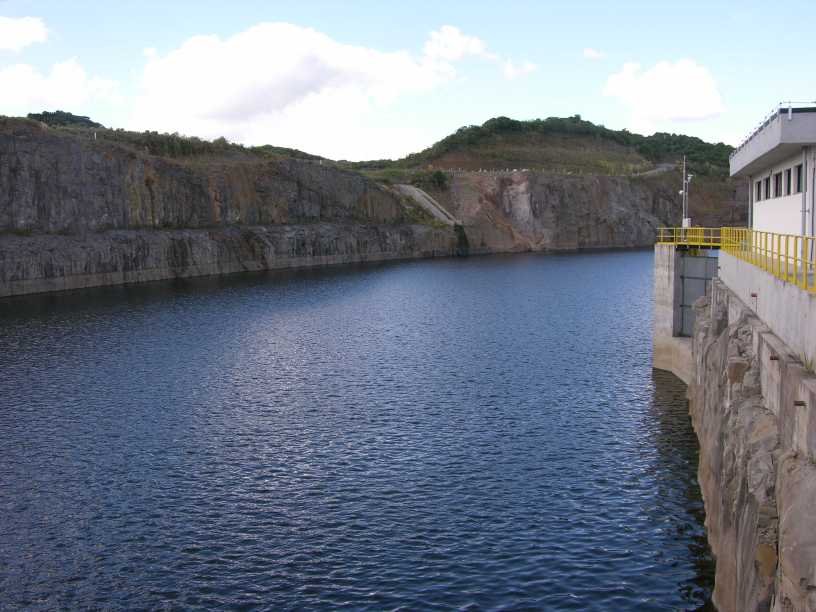
storage lake, March 2008

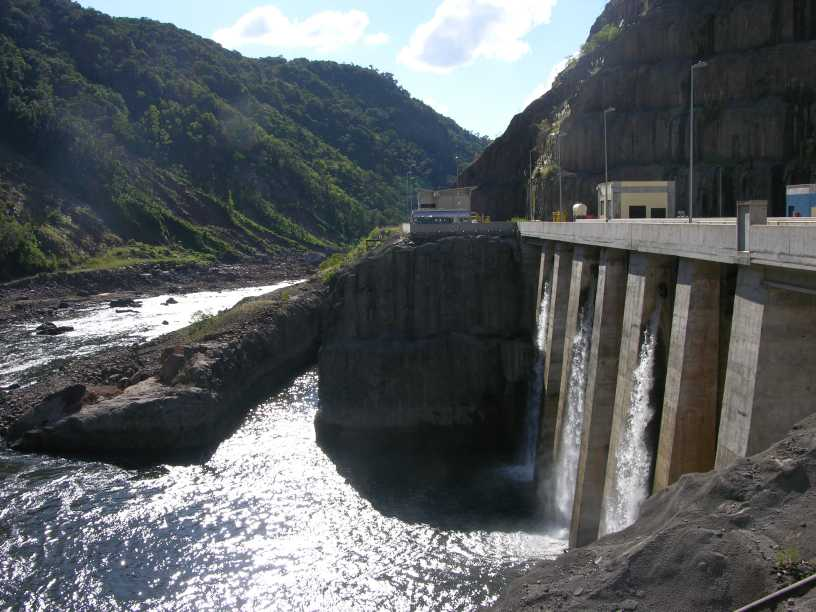
lower side of the power station, March 2008

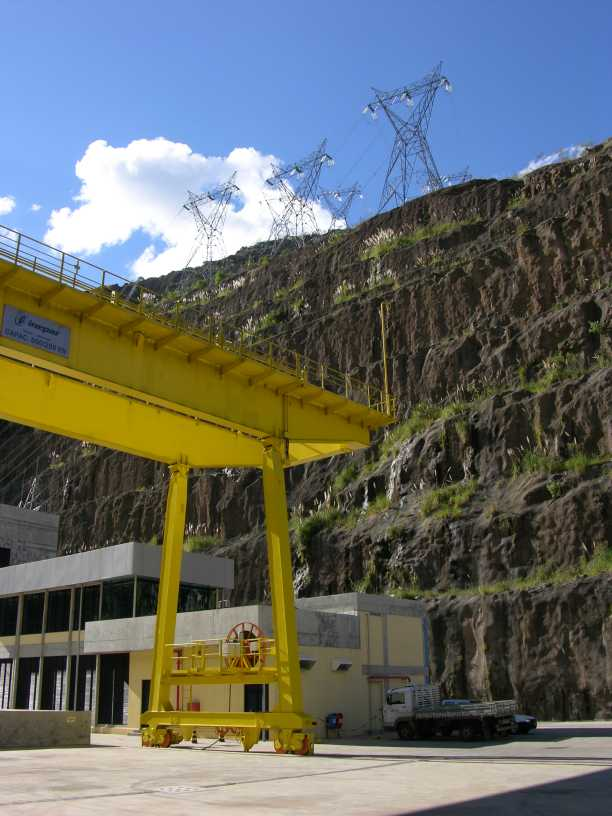
March 2008

== See also ==
- List of hydroelectric power stations
- List of power stations in Brazil
- List of world's tallest dams
