= Renhe =

Renhe may refer to the following places in China:

- Ren River, a river in Chongqing, Sichuan, and Shaanxi, the longest tributary of Han River system
- Renhe District, a district of Panzhihua, Sichuan

== Towns, townships, and subdistricts ==
Chongqing

- Renhe Subdistrict, Yubei District, a subdistrict in Yubei District
- Renhe Subdistrict, Yunyang County, a subdistrict in Yunyang County

Guangdong

- Renhe, Guangdong, a town in Guangzhou

Guizhou

- Renhe Yi and Miao Ethnic Township, a township in Qianxi County

Henan

- Renhe, Huangchuan County, a town in Huangchuan County
- Renhe, Minquan County, a town in Minquan County
- Renhe Subdistrict, Zhoukou, a subdistrict in Chuanhui District, Zhoukou

Hunan

- Renhe, Ningyuan County, a town in Ningyuan County
- Renhe Township, Xiping County, a township in Xiping County

Jiangxi

- Renhe, Xiajiang County, a town in Xiajiang County
- Renhe Township, Xinyu, a township in Xinyu

Shandong

- Renhe, Weihai, a town in Rongcheng, Weihai
- Renhe Subdistrict, Gaotang County, a subdistrict in Gaotang County

Sichuan

- Renhe, Renhe District, a town in Renhe District
- Renhe, Shehong County, a town in Shehong County
- Renhe, Xichong County, a town in Xichong County
- Renhe, Zitong County, a town in Zitong County
- Renhe Township, Chengdu, a township in Chengdu
- Renhe Township, Dazhu County, a township in Dazhu County
- Renhe Township, Anyue County, a township in Anyue County
- Renhe Township, Linshui County, a township in Linshui County
- Renhe Township, Jiang'an County, a township in Jiang'an County
- Renhe Township, Nanjiang County, a township in Nanjiang County

Yunnan

- Renhe, Maguan County, in Maguan County, Yunnan
- Renhe, Shidian County, in Shidian County, Yunnan
- Renhe, Yongsheng County, in Yongsheng County, Yunnan

Zhejiang

- Renhe Subdistrict, Hangzhou, a subdistrict in Yuhang District, Hangzhou
