= Liyang Plain =

Plain in Hunan, China

- Chinese: 澧阳平原
- Location: Northwestern Hunan
- Known for: The earliest origin of rice in the world

Liyang Plain or Liyang Pingyuan (simplified Chinese: 澧阳平原; traditional Chinese: 澧陽平原; pinyin: Lǐyáng píngyuán) is a plain is located in the middle and lower reaches of the Lishui River on the northwestern shore of Dongting Lake in Hunan Province. It includes numerous rivers and lakes.

Liyang Plain is recognized as one of the first places where rice cultivation originated in the world.
