= Jiangya =

Jiangya may refer to:

- SS Jiangya, or SS Kiangya, Chinese steamship that blew up in December 1948
- Jiangya, Cili, town in Hunan Province, China
- Jiangya Dam, dam in Zhangjiajie, Hunan Province, China
