= Alpe Gera Dam =

- Location within Italy
- Official name: Diga Alpe Gera
- Country: Italy
- Location: Sondrio
- Coordinates: 46°18′52″N 09°56′37″E
- Construction began: 1958
- Opening date: 1964

Dam and spillways
- Type of dam: Concrete gravity
- Impounds: Cormor
- Height: 174 m (571 ft)
- Length: 528 m (1,732 ft)
- Elevation at crest: 2,128 m (6,982 ft)
- Dam volume: 1,700,000 m^{3} (2,223,516 cu yd)
- Spillway capacity: 62 m^{3}/s (2,190 cu ft/s)

Reservoir
- Total capacity: 68,100,000 m^{3} (55,210 acre⋅ft)
- Active capacity: 62,700,000 m^{3} (50,832 acre⋅ft)
- Normal elevation: 2,125 m (6,972 ft)

Power Station
- Installed capacity: 35 MW

The Alpe Gera Dam is a gravity dam on the Cormor River in a lateral valley of Valmalenco 17 km (11 mi) northeast of Sondrio in the Lombardy region of Italy. It is 174 m (571 ft) tall and supports a 35 MW hydroelectric power station.

The dam was constructed between 1958 and 1964 and is best known for the concrete placement techniques used during its construction. Instead of concrete being poured into conventional monoliths, it was poured in layers with a lean mix. Next, the concrete was settled with immersed vibrators and then contraction joints were cut into the layer. These methods were not only cost-saving but instrumental in the development of roller-compacted concrete in dam construction.

== See also ==
- List of tallest dams in the world
