= Jiangpinghe Dam =

- Location within China
- Country: China
- Location: Hefeng County in Hubei Province
- Coordinates: 29°44′41″N 110°22′04″E
- Status: Under construction
- Construction began: 2005
- Opening date: 2012

Dam and spillways
- Type of dam: Embankment, concrete face rock-fill
- Impounds: Loushui River
- Height: 221 metres (725 ft)
- Length: 414 metres (1,358 ft)
- Dam volume: 7,180,000 cubic metres (253,559,307 ft^{3})
- Spillways: 3
- Spillway type: Discharge tunnels

Reservoir
- Creates: Jiangpinghe Reservoir
- Total capacity: 1,366,000,000 cubic metres (1,107,434 acre⋅ft)
- Catchment area: 2,140 metres (7,021 ft)

Power Station
- Commission date: July 2012
- Turbines: 2 x 250 MW Francis-type
- Installed capacity: 500 MW
- Annual generation: 1005 GWh

The Jiangpinghe Dam (Chinese: 江坪河水电站大坝; pinyin: Jiāngpínghé shuǐdiànzhàn dàbà; lit. 'Jiangpinghe Hydroelectric Station Dam') is a concrete face rock-fill embankment dam on the Loushui River near Jiangpinghe village, Zouma Town, in Hefeng County in Hubei Province, China. The purpose of the dam is hydroelectric power generation, flood control and irrigation. The dam houses a hydroelectric power station with 2 x 250 MW generators for a total installed capacity of 500 MW. Its expected generation of 1005 GWh will be transferred to the Central China Power Grid. Construction on the dam began in 2005 and the first generator went online in July 2012. The dam is 221 metres (725 ft) tall, withholding a 1,366,000,000 cubic metres (1,107,434 acre⋅ft) reservoir of which 787,000,000 cubic metres (638,031 acre⋅ft) is active or "useful" storage.

== See also ==
- List of power stations in China
