= Huites Dam =

- Location of Huites Dam in Mexico
- Official name: Luis Donaldo Colosio Dam
- Location: Sinaloa, Mexico
- Coordinates: 26°50′41″N 108°22′08″W
- Construction began: 1992
- Opening date: 1995
- Construction cost: US$ 212 million

Dam and spillways
- Type of dam: Concrete gravity
- Impounds: Rio Fuerte
- Height: 162 m (531 ft)
- Length: 426 m (1,398 ft)
- Dam volume: 2,980,000 m^{3} (3,900,000 yd^{3})
- Spillway type: Overflow, 4x radial gates
- Spillway capacity: 22,445 m^{3}/s (792,600 cu ft/s)

Reservoir
- Total capacity: 4.568 km^{3} (3,703,000 acre⋅ft)
- Active capacity: 2.908 km^{3} (2,358,000 acre⋅ft)
- Surface area: 93 km^{2} (23,000 acres)

Power Station
- Operator: Comisión Federal de Electricidad
- Commission date: 15 September 1996
- Turbines: 2 x 220 MW Francis-type
- Installed capacity: 422 MW
- Annual generation: 875 million KWh

Huites Dam, officially known as Luis Donaldo Colosio Dam, is located on the Rio Fuerte in northwestern Sinaloa, Mexico 130 kilometres (81 mi) northeast of Los Mochis. The 162-metre (531 ft)-high, hybrid concrete arch-gravity dam impounds a reservoir called Lago Huites or Presa Luís Donaldo Colosio and is owned by the Comisión Federal de Electricidad.

The construction of a dam on the upper Rio Fuerte was considered since the 1940s but the first detailed studies were not made until 1974–1977. Construction started in 1992 with the excavation of a diversion channel around the dam site and the implementation of a pair of cofferdams to protect the site from floods. About 485,000 cubic metres (634,000 yd^{3}) of material was excavated from the site before construction on the actual dam could begin. Placement of the 2,980,000 cubic metres (3,900,000 yd^{3}) of concrete in the dam, hydroelectric power plant and spillway structures was completed in 29 months, with the workforce peaking at 2,671 in May 1993. Construction was completed in 1995 at a cost of roughly US$ 212 million. The dam's two generators were commissioned on 15 September 1996.

The impounded water behind the dam forms a reservoir with a capacity of 4.568 cubic kilometres (3,703,000 acre⋅ft), of which 2.908 cubic kilometres (2,358,000 acre⋅ft) is active capacity and 2.408 cubic kilometres (1,952,000 acre⋅ft) is reserved for irrigation and power production. About 1.102 cubic kilometres (893,000 acre⋅ft) are given exclusively for flood control. Floodwaters are released through a spillway on the south side of the dam, controlled by four 15.5 m × 21.0 m (50.9 ft × 68.9 ft) radial gates. Water stored in the reservoir is used to provide irrigation to 89,700 hectares (222,000 acres) of land in the Fuerte River valley. The dam's power plant has two Francis turbines with a combined generating capacity of 422 megawatts (MW) and produces an average of 875 million KWh annually. At full capacity, the plant utilizes a water flow of 235 m^{3}/s (8,300 cu ft/s).

== See also ==
- List of power stations in Mexico
- List of tallest dams in the world
