= Loushui River =

Coordinates: 29°42′20″N 110°26′58″E

Loushui
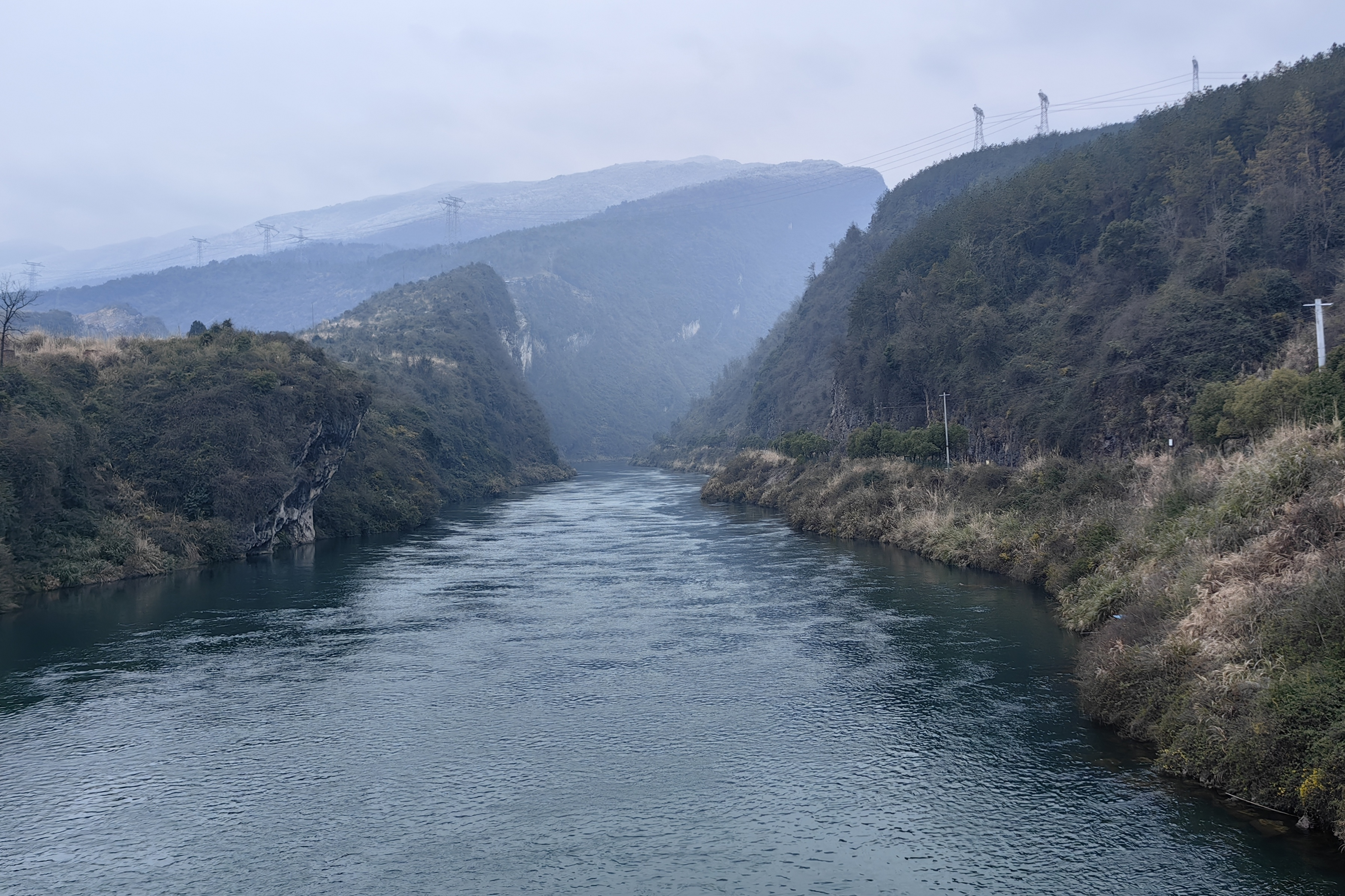
- The Loushui River flows through Jiangya, Cili

Location
- Country: China

Physical characteristics
- Mouth
  - location: Lishui River
- Length: 250 km (160 mi)

The Loushui River (Chinese: 溇水; pinyin: Lóushuǐ) is the main tributary of the Lishui River in China. It starts in the southwestern part of Hubei Province (Wufeng and Hefeng counties), and flows into Hunan Province.

Right before leaving Hubei for Hunan, the river is interrupted by the Jiangpinghe Dam.
