= Maerdang Dam =

- Location within China
- Country: China
- Location: Maqên County, Golog Tibetan Autonomous Prefecture, Qinghai Province
- Coordinates: 34°40′21.44″N 100°41′32.43″E
- Purpose: Power
- Status: Completed
- Construction began: 2011
- Opening date: 2024

Dam and spillways
- Type of dam: Embankment, concrete-face rock-fill
- Impounds: Yellow River
- Height: 211 m (692 ft)

Reservoir
- Total capacity: 1,482,000,000 m^{3} (1,201,000 acre⋅ft)

Power Station
- Commission date: 2025
- Type: Conventional
- Turbines: 5 (4 x 550 MW and 1 x 120 MW)
- Installed capacity: 2,320 megawatts (3,110,000 hp)
- Annual generation: 7,300 GWh (26,000 TJ)

The Maerdang Dam is a concrete-face rock-fill dam on the upper Yellow River in Maqên County, Qinghai Province, China. Construction on the dam began in 2011 and its hydropower station was originally expected to be operational in 2018. On 13 November 2013, the river was successfully diverted around the construction site.

The complex is located at an elevation of over 3,000 m AMSL, and its construction presented extreme challenges due to the high altitude, cold climate and lower oxygen level, which delayed its completion. Located in a nature reserve, the construction of the hydropower station required measures aimed to mitigate its impact on local wildlife, including fish lifts that help fish migrate upstream.

The power plant went into full operation as the last one of its five turbines was successfully connected to the power grid on December 31, 2024. The station is operated by CHN Energy, a state-owned energy enterprise and has a total installed capacity of 2.32 GW. Maerdang hydropower station is expected to generate an average of over 7.3 TW of electricity each year.

== See also ==
- List of tallest dams in the world
- List of dams and reservoirs in China
- List of tallest dams in China
