= Yangqu Dam =

- Location within China
- Country: China
- Location: Xinghai County, Hainan Tibetan Autonomous Prefecture, Qinghai Province
- Coordinates: 35°42′4″N 100°16′8″E
- Purpose: Power
- Status: Operational
- Construction began: 2010
- Opening date: 2016

Dam and spillways
- Type of dam: Embankment, concrete-face rock-fill
- Impounds: Yellow River
- Height: 150 m (490 ft)

Reservoir
- Total capacity: 1,472,000,000 m^{3} (1,193,000 acre⋅ft)

Power Station
- Commission date: 2016 (est.)
- Type: Conventional
- Turbines: 3 x 400 MW Francis-type
- Installed capacity: 1,200 MW

The Yanqu Dam is a concrete-face rock-fill dam on the Yellow River in Xinghai County, Qinghai Province, China. Construction on the dam began in 2010 and its 1,200 MW hydroelectric power station became operational in 2016. It is located upstream of the Longyangxia Dam.

== See also ==
- List of tallest dams in the world
- List of dams and reservoirs in China
- List of tallest dams in China
