= Zouma =

Zouma is a Central African surname. Notable people with the surname include:

- Kurt Zouma (born 1994), plays for West Ham and France
- Lionel Zouma (born 1993), plays for Vevey United and the Central African Republic
- Yoan Zouma (born 1998), plays for Dagenham and Redbridge and the Central African Republic

It is also the name of towns and villages in China:

- Zouma, Hefeng County (走马镇), in Hefeng County, Enshi Tujia and Miao Autonomous Prefecture, Hubei
- Zouma, a village in Shawo Township, Echeng District, Ezhou, Hubei
- Zouma, a village in Meichuan, Wuxue, Huanggang, Hubei
