= Renhe, Zitong County =

Renhe 仁和镇
- Town
- Location in Sichuan
- Coordinates: 31°30′24″N 105°21′19″E
- Country: People's Republic of China
- Province: Sichuan
- Prefecture-level city: Mianyang
- County: Zitong County
- Time zone: UTC+8 (China Standard)

Renhe (Chinese: 仁和; pinyin: Rénhé) is a town under the administration of Zitong County, Sichuan, China. As of 2020, it administers Tianbaochang Residential Community (金宝场社区) and the following 12 villages:

- Tianle Village (天乐村)
- Guanlong Village (观龙村)
- Mengya Village (檬桠村)
- Xinhua Village (新华村)
- Songlin Village (松林村)
- Tiantai Village (天台村)
- Shuguang Village (曙光村)
- Qiushu Village (秋树村)
- Liren Village (里仁村)
- Lianghe Village (两河村)
- Daxin Village (大新村)
- Qingyuan Village (青元村)

In 2019, Renhe absorbed the administrative area of Daxin (大新) which was abolished.
