= Urayama =

Urayama (written: 浦山) is a Japanese surname. Notable people with the surname include:

- Jin Urayama (浦山 迅) (born 1956), Japanese actor and voice actor
- Kirio Urayama (浦山 桐郎) (1930–1985), Japanese film director and screenwriter

== See also ==
- Urayama Station (浦山駅, Urayama-eki), train station in Kurobe, Toyama Prefecture, Japan
