= Place Moulin Dam =

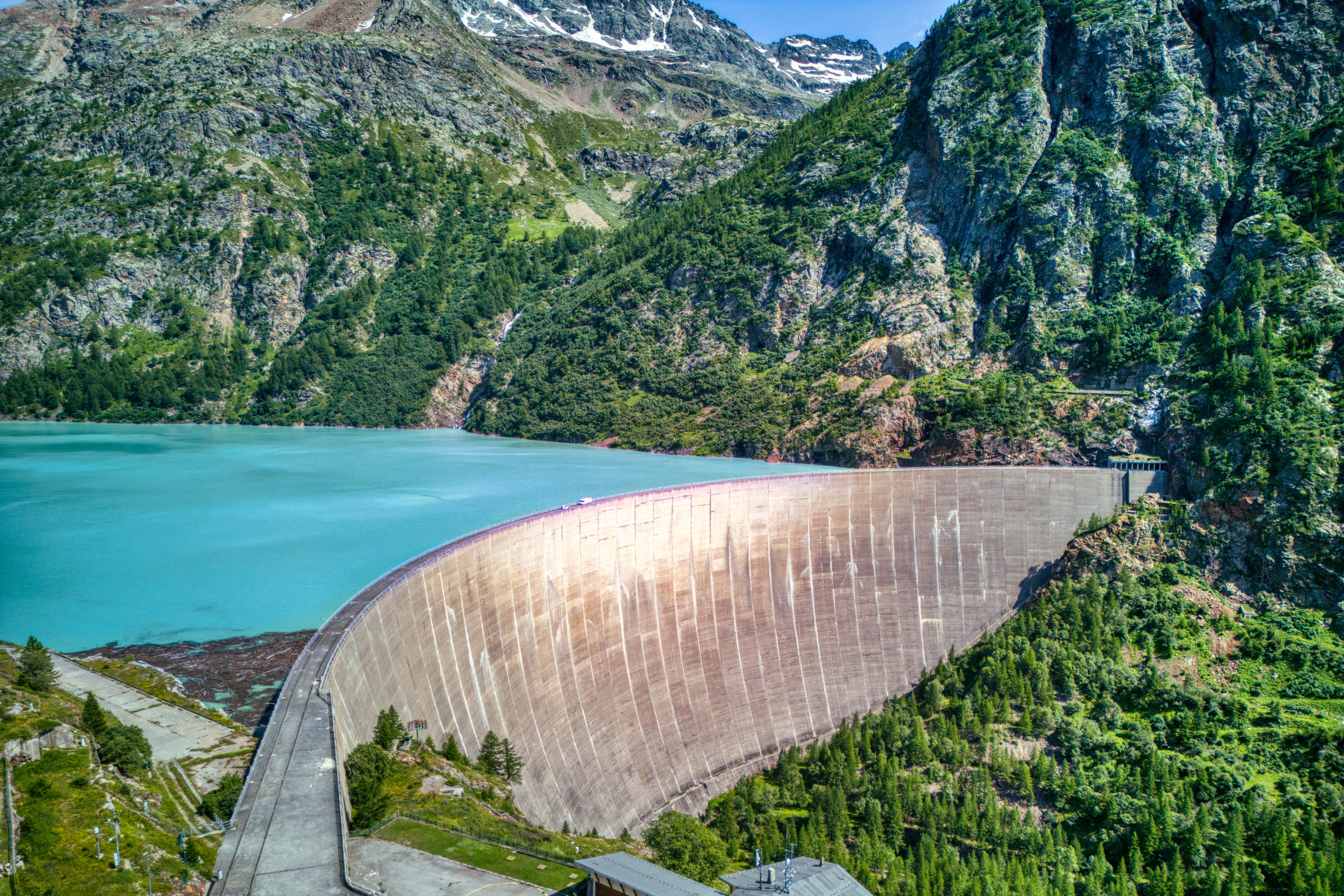
- Place Moulin Dam and reservoir

- Location of Place Moulin Dam within Italy
- Location: Bionaz, Aosta Valley, Italy
- Coordinates: 45°53′53″N 7°29′37″E
- Purpose: Power
- Construction began: 1955
- Opening date: 1965

Dam and spillways
- Impounds: Buthier
- Height: 155 m (509 ft)
- Length: 678 m (2,224 ft)

Reservoir
- Creates: Lake Place Moulin

Place Moulin Dam is one of the largest dams in Europe and is in Bionaz, in Northern Italy. The 678 m long and 155 m high arch dam was constructed between 1955 and 1965 and has an artificial reservoir capable of holding 105 million m^{3} of water.

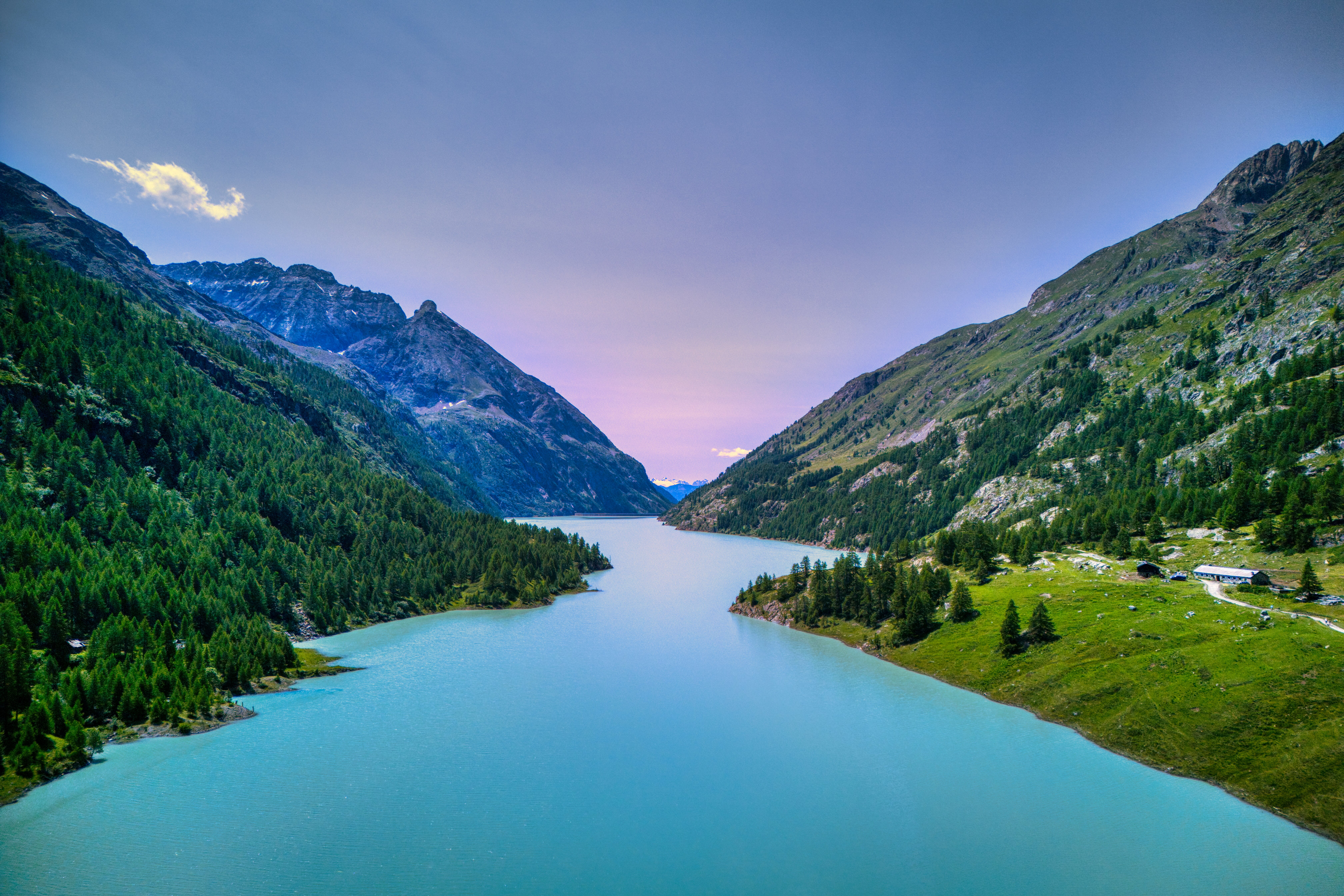
The reservoir formed by the Place Moulin Dam

== Structure ==
The dam has a 137 km^{2} catchment basin, with nearly 20% of it being made up of glacier run offs. The dam has a 47 m thick base and 6.43 m thick summit, designed to ensure easier inspection. The dam also has two perimeter tunnels and eight horizontal tunnels allowing for technicians to easily walk through them for inspection. The reservoir was first filled in 1967.

== See also ==
- http://www.comune.bionaz.ao.it/Portals/Bionaz/download/DigaPlaceMoulin.pdf - Original Brochure Published in 1967
