= Celesc =

Centrais Elétricas de Santa Catarina S.A.

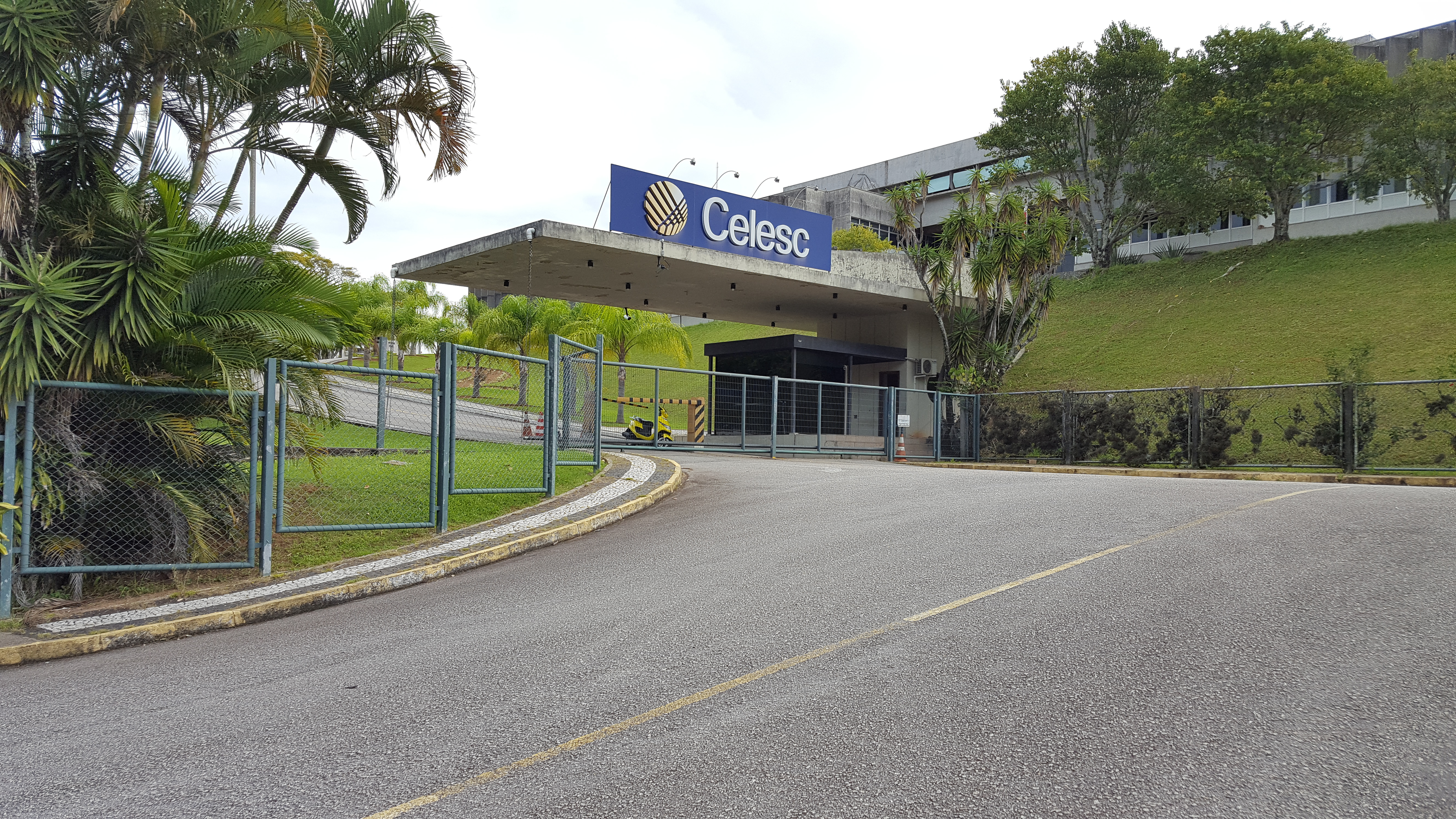
- Type: Sociedade Anônima
- Traded as: B3: CLSC3, CLSC4
- Industry: Electricity
- Founded: 1955
- Headquarters: Florianópolis, Brazil
- Key people: Cleicio Poleto Martins (CEO)
- Products: Electrical power natural gas
- Services: Electricity distribution Electricity transmission
- Revenue: ▲US$2.2 billion (2012)
- Net income: ▼ - US$126.0 million (2012)
- Number of employees: 3,300 (2014)
- Website: www.celesc.com.br

Centrais Elétricas de Santa Catarina (Celesc) is the electricity utility for the southern Brazilian state of Santa Catarina. In 2014, the company had around 2.6-million customers and sold around 23.3 TWh of electricity. It generates power from 16 plants, all of them hydroelectric, with installed capacity of around 126MW. The company also owns some 5,100 km of distribution lines and a 148,164 km distribution network. Celesc is headquartered in the Santa Catarina capital of Florianópolis.

Founded in 1955 by a decree signed by then-Governor Irineu Bornhausen, it is controlled by the state of Santa Catarina, who owns just over 20% of Celesc's stocks, that are traded on B3 (formerly BM&F Bovespa). Prior to Celesc's foundation, the electricity needs of Santa Catarina were primarily met by small privately owned hydroelectric plants such as the Salto Weissbach Hydroelectric Plant in Blumenau, the Piraí Hydroelectric Plant in Joinville and the Maroim Hydroelectric Plant in São José. As these plants did not provide enough electricity to supply the entire state, Celesc was formed, initially as a planning agency for the state's electrical system. Gradually, Celesc absorbed all of the state's regional electricity companies.

In October 2006, the company passed by a reorganization process, in which it was transformed into a "holding" that kept the name Centrais Elétricas de Santa Catarina. Two new companies had been created, one of them responsible for the distribution (Celesc Distribuição) and another responsible for the generation of electric power (Celesc Geração).
