= Hefeng County =

Hefeng County 鹤峰县 Hofeng
- County
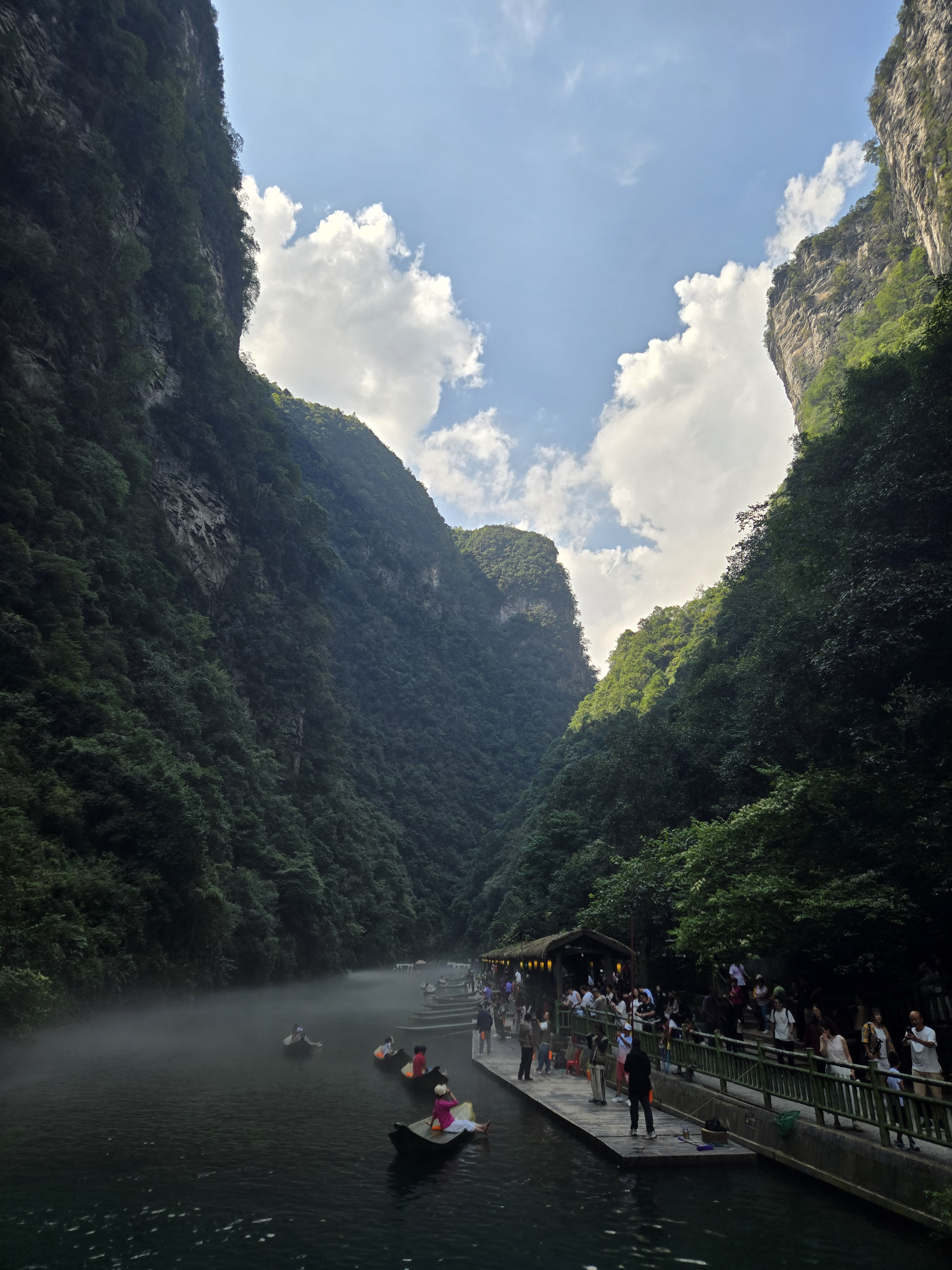

- Location of the seat in Hubei
- Coordinates: 29.890°N 110.034°E
- Country: People's Republic of China
- Province: Hubei
- Prefecture: Enshi

Area
  - Total: 2,868 km^{2} (1,107 sq mi)

Population (2020)
  - Total: 174,650
  - Density: 60.90/km^{2} (157.7/sq mi)
- Time zone: UTC+8 (China Standard)
- Website: www.hefeng.gov.cn

Hefeng County (simplified Chinese: 鹤峰县; traditional Chinese: 鶴峰縣; pinyin: Hèfēng Xiàn) is a county on the upper reaches of the Loushui River in the southwestern part of Hubei province, People's Republic of China, bordering Hunan province to the south. It is under the administration of the Enshi Tujia and Miao Autonomous Prefecture.

== Administrative Divisions ==
Five towns:

- Zouma (走马镇), Rongmei (容美镇), Taiping (太平镇, before 2013 Taiping Township 太平乡), Yanzi (燕子镇, before 2013 Yanzi Township 燕子乡), Zhongying (中营乡, before 2013 Zhongying Township 中营乡)

Four townships:

- Tielu Township (铁炉乡), Wuli Township (五里乡), Xiaping Township (下坪乡), Wuyang Township (邬阳乡)

== Climate ==
Climate data for Hefeng, elevation 540 m (1,770 ft), (1991–2020 normals, extremes 1981–2010)
Month	Jan	Feb	Mar	Apr	May	Jun	Jul	Aug	Sep	Oct	Nov	Dec	Year
Record high °C (°F)	21.3 (70.3)	25.0 (77.0)	33.3 (91.9)	36.0 (96.8)	36.2 (97.2)	37.6 (99.7)	38.5 (101.3)	38.2 (100.8)	36.8 (98.2)	32.2 (90.0)	28.1 (82.6)	22.0 (71.6)	38.5 (101.3)
Mean daily maximum °C (°F)	9.1 (48.4)	11.5 (52.7)	16.4 (61.5)	22.5 (72.5)	26.1 (79.0)	29.0 (84.2)	31.5 (88.7)	31.8 (89.2)	27.4 (81.3)	21.9 (71.4)	16.9 (62.4)	11.4 (52.5)	21.3 (70.3)
Daily mean °C (°F)	5.0 (41.0)	7.0 (44.6)	10.9 (51.6)	16.2 (61.2)	20.0 (68.0)	23.2 (73.8)	25.5 (77.9)	25.4 (77.7)	21.7 (71.1)	16.6 (61.9)	11.8 (53.2)	6.8 (44.2)	15.8 (60.5)
Mean daily minimum °C (°F)	2.6 (36.7)	4.3 (39.7)	7.5 (45.5)	12.2 (54.0)	16.3 (61.3)	19.8 (67.6)	22.2 (72.0)	21.9 (71.4)	18.4 (65.1)	13.8 (56.8)	9.0 (48.2)	4.3 (39.7)	12.7 (54.8)
Record low °C (°F)	−4.8 (23.4)	−4.3 (24.3)	−2.2 (28.0)	3.1 (37.6)	7.6 (45.7)	12.6 (54.7)	15.6 (60.1)	14.9 (58.8)	11.1 (52.0)	4.1 (39.4)	−0.1 (31.8)	−3.9 (25.0)	−4.8 (23.4)
Average precipitation mm (inches)	37.1 (1.46)	51.5 (2.03)	77.4 (3.05)	134.3 (5.29)	203.7 (8.02)	275.2 (10.83)	324.9 (12.79)	198.9 (7.83)	156.7 (6.17)	120.0 (4.72)	70.8 (2.79)	26.3 (1.04)	1,676.8 (66.02)
Average precipitation days (≥ 0.1 mm)	12.4	12.9	14.9	16.0	17.6	18.6	19.1	16.2	14.0	14.4	12.6	11.0	179.7
Average snowy days	5.5	3.0	0.6	0	0	0	0	0	0	0	0.1	1.4	10.6
Average relative humidity (%)	80	80	79	79	81	83	84	81	82	83	83	81	81
Mean monthly sunshine hours	50.2	49.8	79.5	101.1	109.0	105.8	138.6	160.1	105.3	84.4	73.4	62.5	1,119.7
Percentage possible sunshine	15	16	21	26	26	25	33	39	29	24	23	20	25
Source: China Meteorological Administration

== Economy ==
- Jiangpinghe Dam, near Jiangpinghe Village, Zouma Town
