= Ren River =

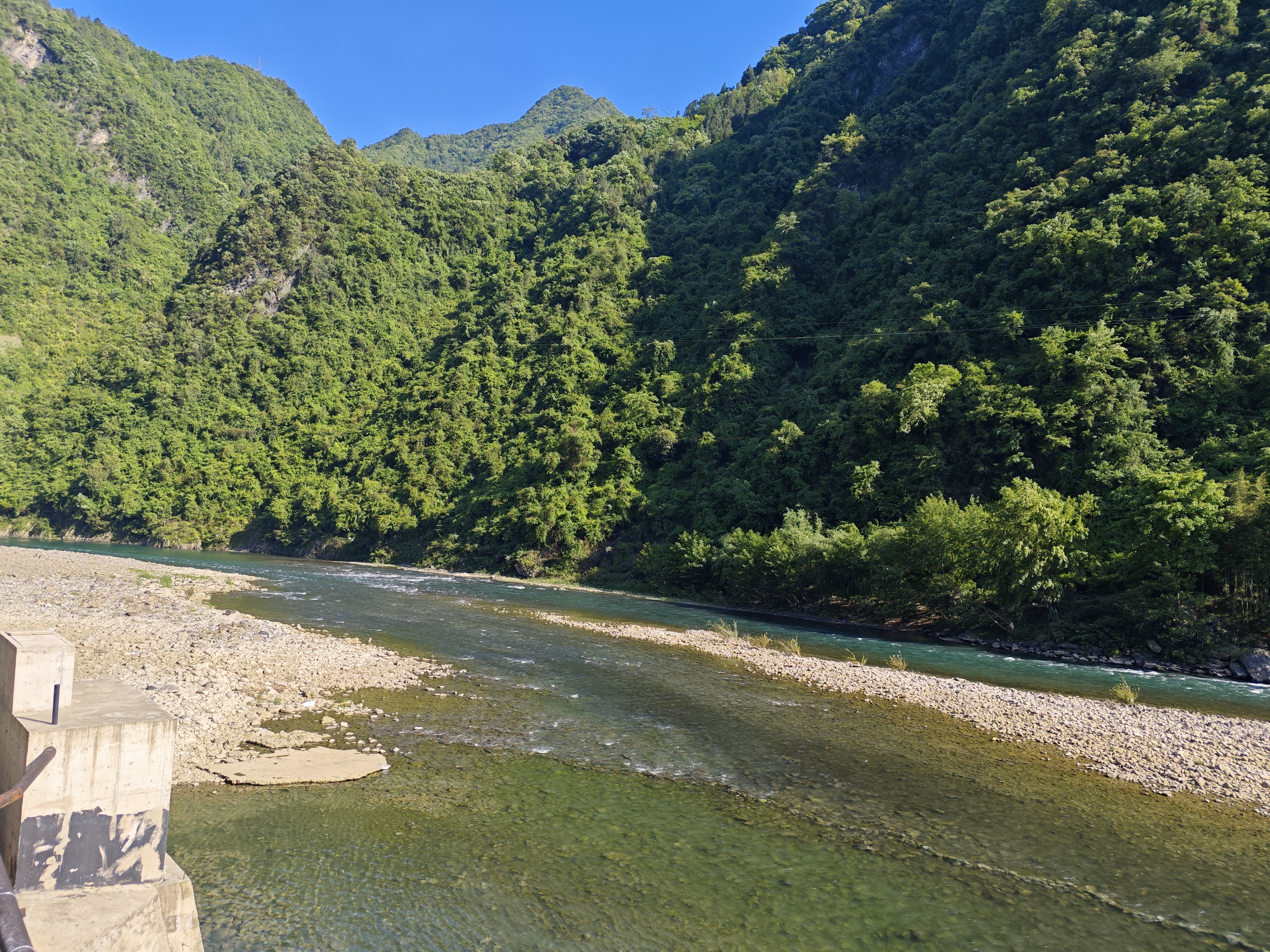

Location
- Country: China

Physical characteristics
- Length: 220 km (140 mi)
- Basin size: 4,871 km^{2} (1,881 sq mi)
- Discharge
  - average: 106 m^{3}/s (3,700 cu ft/s)

Basin features
- River system: Yangtze

Ren River is a river in Yangtze River basin in China. It is upstream of the right bank of the Han River. It extends for 220 kilometres (140 mi), a basin area of 4,871 square kilometres (1,881 sq mi), with an average annual flow of 106 cubic metres (3,700 cu ft) per second. It drops 1,500 metres (4,900 ft) along its length.
