= Lishui River =

River in Hunan, China

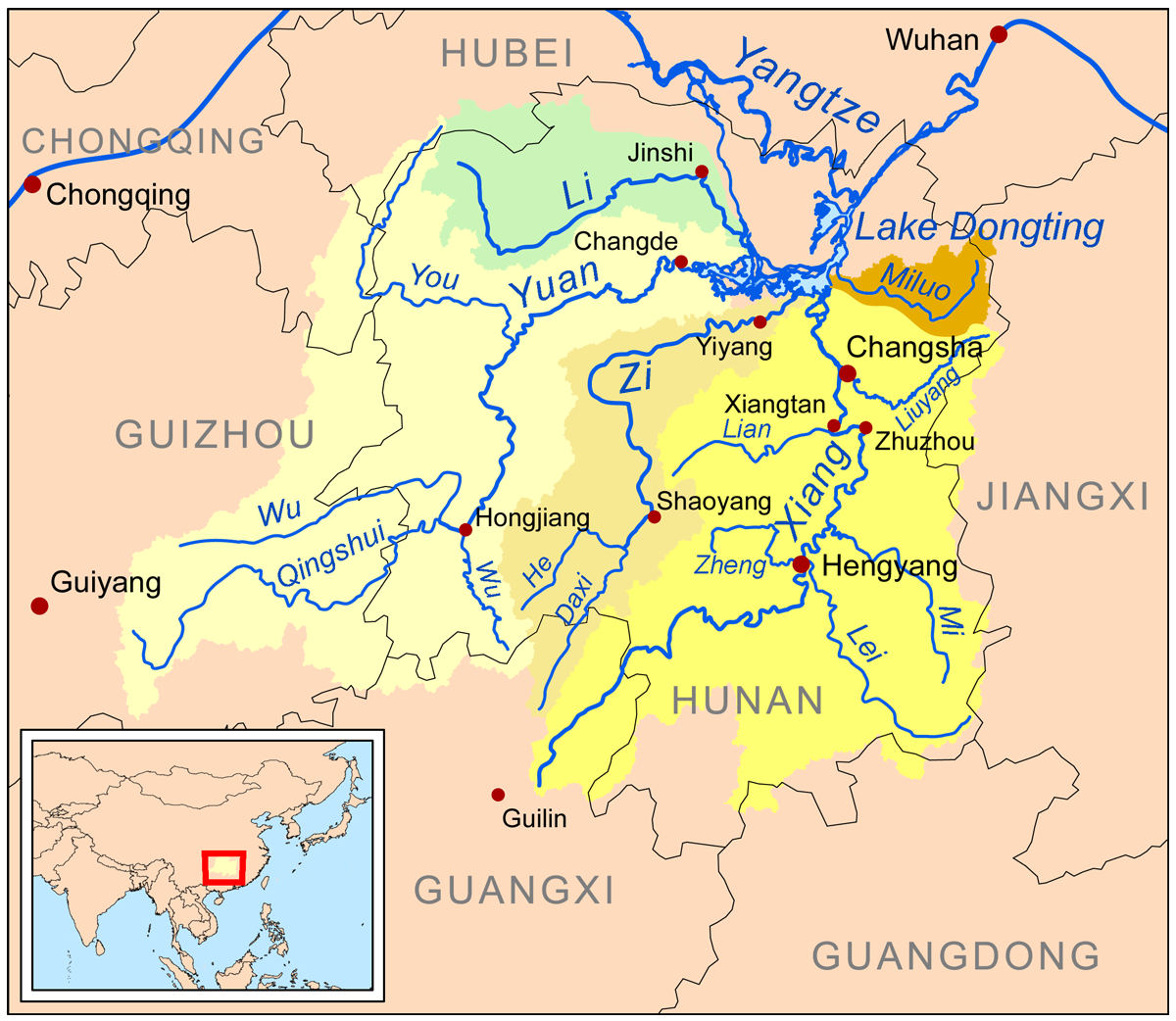
Map showing the Li River basin

Lishui River (also known as Li River, Chinese language: 澧水, pinyin: lǐshuǐ, Wade-Giles: li^{3}-shui^{3}) is a river in Hunan province of China, one of the Yangtze River's four largest tributaries in the province.

Lishui has three origination places, the north, the middle and the south. The north one is the most important place, origination from Shanmujie of Sangzhi County in Zhangjiajie. The middle one, origination from the east side of the Badagong Mountain in Sangzhi and the south place, origination from Longjiazhai of Yongshun County in Xiangxi. The three originations join the main river in Nancha of Sangzhi, then runs east. Loushui River is a tributary of Lishui River.

It flows into the Dongting Lake at Xiaodukou in Jinshi. Its total length is 388 kilometres (241 mi).

== Cities along the river include (listed from mouth to source) ==
- Jinshi
- Lixian
- Shimen
- Cili
- Zhangjiajie

== See also ==
- Geography of China
- List of rivers in China
