= Canoas River (Santa Catarina) =

Coordinates: 27°36′21″S 51°27′20″W

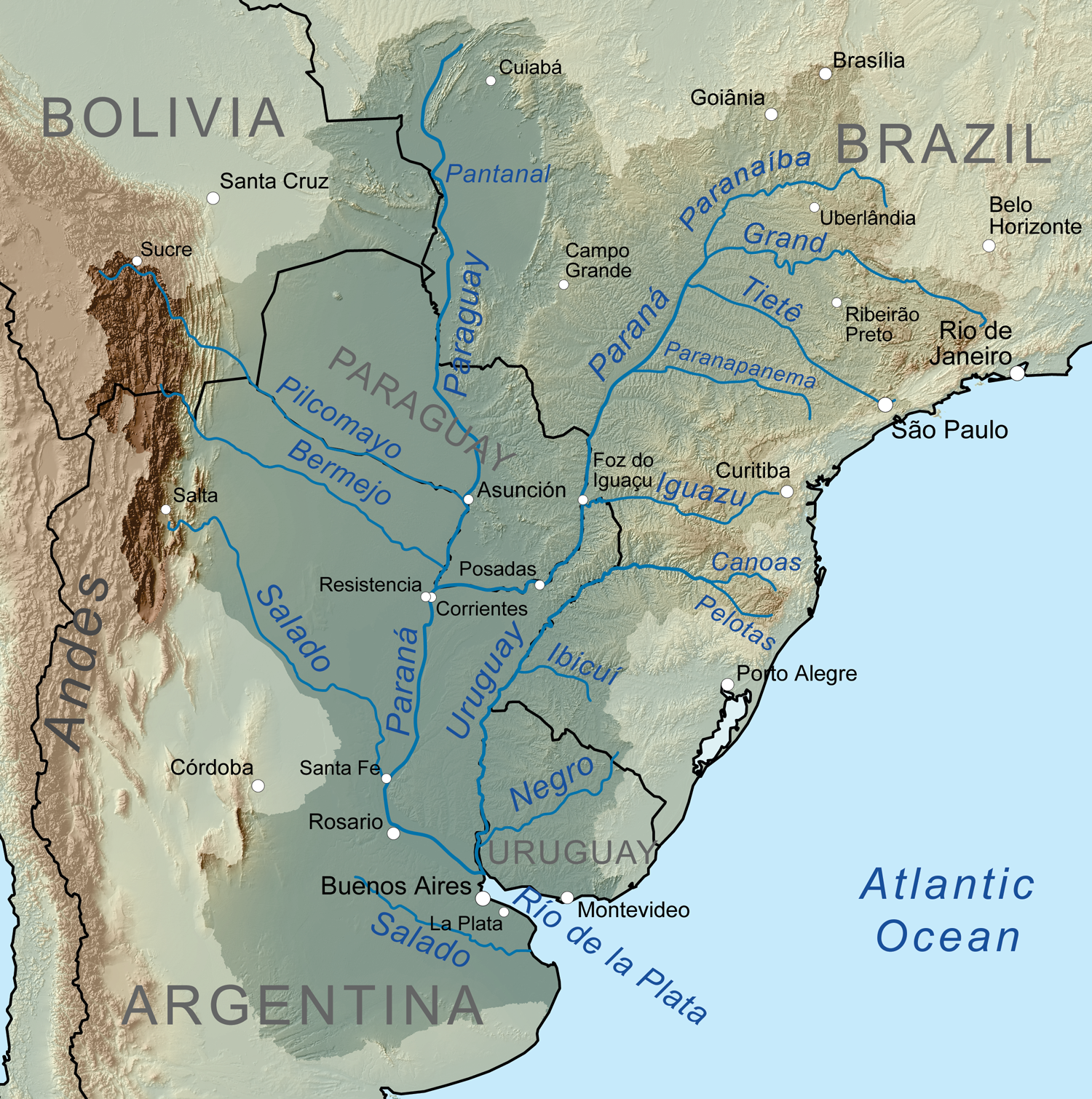
- Map of the La Plata Basin, showing the Canoas River joining the Pelotas River to form the Uruguay River

Location
- Country: Brazil

Physical characteristics
- Source
  - location: Santa Catarina state
- Mouth
  - location: Uruguay River

The Canoas River (Portuguese, Rio Canoas) is a river of Santa Catarina state in southeastern Brazil. With a length of 570 kilometres, the river joins the Pelotas River to form the Uruguay River.

== See also ==
- List of rivers of Santa Catarina
