= Jiangya, Cili =

Jiangya Town 江垭镇
- Town
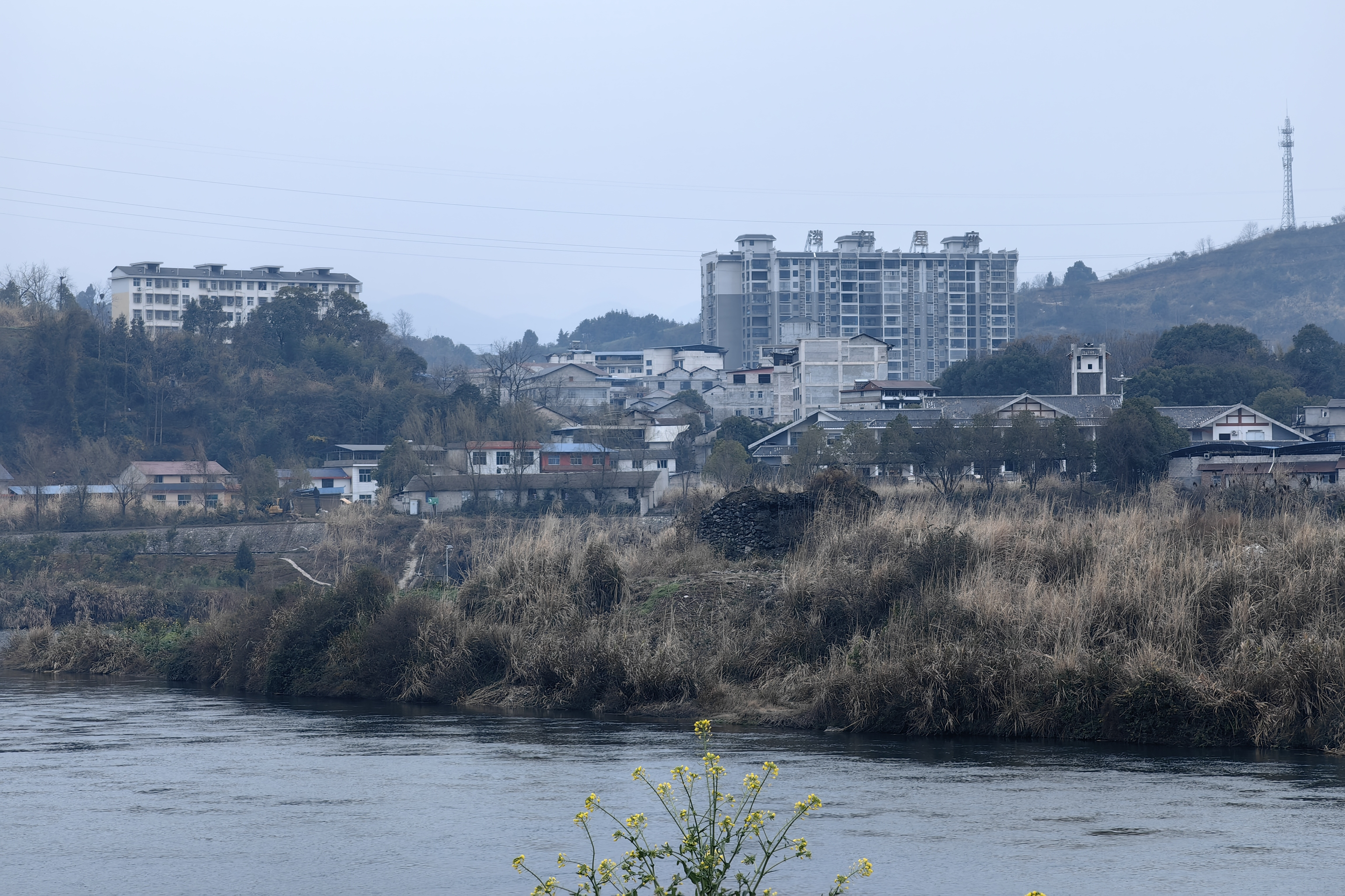

- Location in Hunan
- Coordinates: 29°30′18″N 110°45′55″E
- Country: People's Republic of China
- Province: Hunan
- Prefecture-level city: Zhangjiajie
- County: Cili County

Area
  - Total: 298 km^{2} (115 sq mi)

Population
  - Total: 50,000
  - Density: 170/km^{2} (430/sq mi)
- Time zone: UTC+8 (China Standard)
- Area code: 0744

Jiangya Town (simplified Chinese: 江垭镇; traditional Chinese: 江埡鎮; pinyin: Jiāngyā Zhèn) is an urban town in Cili County, Zhangjiajie, Hunan Province, People's Republic of China.

== Administrative divisions ==
The town is divided into 47 villages and 5 communities, which include the following areas:

- Donghejie Community
- Linjiang Community
- Xinglongjie Community
- Dingzijie Community
- Nongmaoshichang Community
- Longwanggang Village
- Bijiaping Village
- Sanshuang Village
- Jiaochangping Village
- Meishiping Village
- Longtai Village
- Lianping Village
- Baiyan Village
- Wusi Village
- Sipo Village
- Lijiayu Village
- Wulidui Village
- Guanta Village
- Qingshuidong Village
- Guanqiao Village
- Badouqiu Village
- Zhuojiayu Village
- Changyu Village
- Qipanta Village
- Jiangya Village
- Jiuxi Village
- Bijia Village
- Hexin Village
- Taojiayu Village
- Laotang Village
- Shuangtan Village
- Jinji Village
- Fengya Village
- Baiyanyu Village
- Xiongjiazhuang Village
- Huangjinta Village
- Xinglongpu Village
- Guangji Village
- Ganxiping Village
- Ximuping Village
- Zhaigongpo Village
- Jigongluo Village
- Huitangping Village
- CheYanping Village
- Xiniuyuan Village
- Wanshiping Village
- Jiuliya Village
- Sanchaxi Village
- Piya Village
- Qingchangling Village
- Yanbantian Village
- Guanya Village
- Jiangya Village
