= Electricity sector in Peru =

Electricity sector of Peru
Data
- Electricity coverage (July 2018): 96.4% (total), 86.7% (rural); (LAC total average in 2007: 92%)
- Installed capacity (2006): 6.7 GW
- Share of fossil energy: 52%
- Share of renewable energy: 48% (hydro)
- GHG emissions from electricity generation (2003): 3.32 Mt CO_{2}
- Average electricity use (2006): 872 kWh per capita
- Distribution losses (2006): 6.3%; (LAC average in 2005: 13.6%)
- Transmission losses (2006): 4.7%

Consumption by sector (% of total)
- Residential: 24%
- Industrial: 66%
- Commercial: 19%

Tariffs and financing
- Average residential tariff (US$/kW·h, 2006): 0.1046; (LAC average in 2005: 0.115)
- Annual investment in electricity (2006): 484.6 million (27% public, 73% private)

Services
- Sector unbundling: Yes
- Share of private sector in generation: 69%
- Competitive supply to large users: Yes
- Competitive supply to residential users: No

Institutions
- No. of service providers: 38 (generation), 6 (transmission), 22 (distribution)
- Responsibility for regulation: DGE-National Electricity Office
- Responsibility for policy-setting: DGE-National Electricity Office
- Responsibility for the environment: National Environment Commission (CONAM)
- Electricity sector law: Yes (1992, modified in 1997)
- Renewable energy law: No
- CDM transactions related to the electricity sector: 7 registered CDM project; 800,020 t CO_{2}e annual emissions reductions

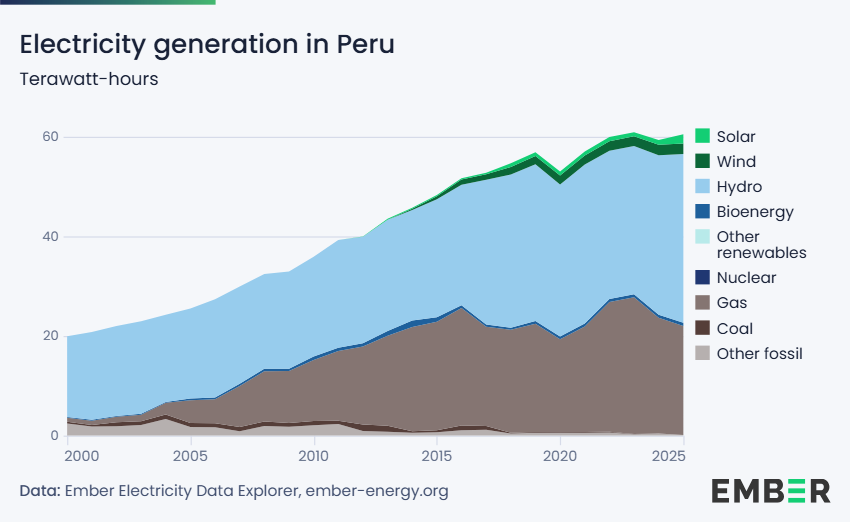
Electricity generation in Peru in terawatt-hours

The electricity sector in Peru has experienced large improvements in the past 15 years. Access to electricity has increased from 45% in 1990 to 96.4% in 2018, while service quality and efficiency of service provision improved. These improvements were made possible through privatizations following reforms initiated in 1992. At the same time, electricity tariffs have remained in line with the average for Latin America.

However, several challenges remain. Chief among them are the still very low level of access in rural areas and the untapped potential of some renewable energies, in particular wind and solar energy, due to an inadequate regulatory framework.

The current electricity generation capacity is evenly divided between thermal and hydroelectric sources. A renewed recent dynamism of the electricity sector in the country is based on the shift to natural gas plants, which will be mainly fed from the production of the Camisea gas field in the Amazon rainforest.

The National Interconnected System (SEIN) serves 85% of the connected population, with several “isolated” systems covering the rest of the country. While investment in generation, transmission and distribution in urban areas is predominantly private, resources for rural electrification come solely from public sources.

== Electricity supply and demand ==
=== Installed capacity ===
Installed generating capacity Peru is evenly divided between thermal and hydroelectric sources. In 2006, the country had 6.7 GW of installed capacity, 52% being thermal and 48% hydroelectric, with a negligible share of other renewable sources. Of the total capacity, 84% (5.63 GW) enters the electricity market, while the remaining 16% (1,03 GW) is generated for self-consumption.

However, electricity generation is not evenly divided between the two dominating sources. In 2006, 72% of Peru's total electricity generation came from hydroelectric plants (total generation was 27.4 TWh), with conventional thermal plants only in operation during peak load periods or when hydroelectric output is curtailed by weather events. This “underuse” of the country's thermal capacity is due to the high variable costs of thermal generation. In 2004, the country's reserve margin was estimated at 45%. However, when those high cost thermal plants were taken out of the equation, margins fell to as low as 15%.

In an attempt to reduce the country's reliance upon hydroelectricity, the Peruvian government has encouraged greater investment in gas-fired power plants. The controversial Camisea Gas Project has opened up natural gas production in Peru, with the first new 140 MW gas-fired power plant in Tumbes to start operations by the end of 2007. The Camisea project is considered strategic for it is expected to contribute to reduce the existing deficit in Peru's hydrocarbons trade balance by substituting imports (mainly of diesel and LPG) and allowing exports (naphta, LPG surpluses).

The dynamic nature of the electricity sector has continued during 2007, with an estimated 9.3% increase in generation, which is expected to reach 30 TWh. This increase is mainly due to the existing positive conditions for thermal generation through the use of natural gas in new plants and also to an increase in hydroelectric generation due to the availability of hydrological resources in the existing hydroelectric facilities.

=== Demand ===
In 2006, total electricity consumption in Peru was 24 TWh, which corresponds to 872 kWh per capita per year. The consumption share for the different economic sectors is as follows:

- Industrial: 66%
- Residential: 24%
- Commercial: 19%
- Public lighting: 3%

=== Demand and supply projections ===
In terms of demand projections, the Ministry of Energy and Mines estimates that electricity demand will increase between 5.6% and 7.4% per year between 2007 and 2015. It is expected that per capita electricity demand will reach 1,632 kWh in 2030.

To meet this increasing demand, Peru will rely on natural gas, which is the most cost-competitive option among all other fuel types. As such, it is expected that the installed capacity of gas-fired electricity generation will increase from 0.3 GW in 2002 to 6.0 GW in 2030. It is expected that, from 2026 onwards, natural gas will acquire the dominant share in the electricity generation mix, reaching 44% in 2030 compared with hydroelectricity's 37% share for the same year.

== Access to electricity ==
In 2006, 79% of the population in Peru had access to electricity, a percentage that is below the 94.6 average for the LAC region Peru has one of the lowest rural electrification rates in Latin America. Coverage in the predominantly poor rural areas is about 30%, with more than six million people without access to electricity. In its 2004 National Rural Electrification Plan (PNER), the Government of Peru reiterated its commitment to reduce the electrification gap, aiming to increase rural coverage from 30% to 75% by 2013.

== Service quality ==
=== Interruption frequency and duration ===
In 2005, the average number of interruptions per subscriber was 14.5, while duration of interruptions per subscriber was 18.3 hours. Both numbers are very close to the weighted averages of 13 interruptions and 14 hours for the LAC region.

=== Distribution and transmission losses ===
Losses in 2006 amounted to 11% of total production. Distribution losses were 6.3%, down from 22% a decade before and below the 13.5% LAC average. Transmission losses for the same year have been estimated at 4.7%.

== Responsibilities in the electricity sector ==
=== Policy and regulation ===
The National Electricity Office (DGE - Dirección General de la Electricidad), under the Ministry of Energy and Mines (MEM), is in charge of setting electricity policies and regulations and of granting concessions. It is also responsible for elaborating generation and transmission expansion plans and has to approve the relevant procedures for the operation of the electricity system.

The Energy and Mining Investment Supervisory Body (OSINERGMIN - Organismo Supervisor de Inversión en Energía y Miniería), created in 1996 as OSINERG (Mining competences were added recently, in January 2007), is in charge of enforcing compliance with the Electricity Concessions Law (LCE) of 1992 and is also in charge of ensuring the electricity public service. OSINERG is as well the body responsible for enforcing the fiscal obligations of the license holders as established by the law and its regulation. Finally, it is responsible for monitoring compliance of the System Economic Operation Committees (COES) functions and for determining biannually the percentages of market participation by the companies.

In 2000, OSINERG was merged with the Electricity Tariffs Commission (CTE), currently known as Adjunct Office for Tariff Regulation (GART). Together, they are in charge of fixing generation, transmission and distribution tariffs and the tariff adjustment conditions for the end consumers. They also determine the tariffs for transport and distribution of gas by pipeline.

As for rural electrification, the National Rural Electrification Office (DGER) is in charge of the National Rural Electrification Plan (PNER), which is framed under the policy guidelines set by the Ministry of Energy and Mines. DGER is in charge of the execution and coordination of projects in rural areas and regions of extreme poverty.

Finally, the National Institute for Defense of Competition and the Protection of Intellectual Property (INDECOPI) is in charge of monitoring compliance with the Anti-monopoly and Anti-oligopoly Law of 1997.

=== Generation ===
In 2006, 38 companies generated electricity for the market, while 78 companies produced electricity for their own use. Among the 38 companies supplying energy to the market, four of them accounted for 70% of the total capacity:

- EDEGEL S.A.A.: 1,574MW
- Electroperú S.A. (ELP): 1,032 MW
- KALLPA Generación
- ENERSUR: 725 MW
- EGENOR: 522 MW

ELP dominates hydroelectric production, with 32% of the total, while EDEGEL leads thermal generation also with 32% of the total.

Private companies dominate the generation sector. In terms of participation, state companies hold 31% of generation capacity, with the remaining 69% in private hands. Production percentages are 40% and 60% for the public and private companies respectively.

Peru’s hydropower dropped by 29 percent in December 2022 compared to the previous year, triggering a 76 percent increase in natural gas generation and a 208 percent rise in diesel-based electricity generation, causing rare outages and rising costs.

=== Transmission ===
In Peru, 100% of the transmission activities are in private hands. In 2006, there were 6 purely transmission companies that participated in electricity transmission in Perú: Red de Energía del Perú S.A. (REPSA), with 28% of the transmission lines; and Consorcio Energético Huancavelica (CONENHUA), Consorcio Transmantaro S.A. (S.A. Transmantaro), Eteselva S.R.L, Interconexión Eléctrica ISA Perú (ISAPERU) and Red Eléctrica del Sur.S.A. (REDESUR), with 15% of the lines. Generation and distribution utilities and the companies that generate electricity for their own consumption operate the remaining 57% of the transmission lines.

=== Distribution ===
In 2020, 63% of the electricity was commercialized by 22 distribution companies, while the remaining 37% was commercialized directly by generation companies. The companies that stood out for their sales to end-consumers were:Enel (25%), Luz del Sur (22%), Enersur (8%), Edegel (7%), Electroperú (5%), Hidrandina (4%), Termoselva (4%) and Electroandes (4%).

Public distribution companies supply electricity to 55% of the existing clients, with the remaining 45% in hands of the private utilities. However, in terms of electricity distributed, private companies have the lead with 71% of the total as opposed to 29% for the public ones.

== Renewable energy resources ==
The National Environment Fund (FONAM) was created in 1997 and received the mandate from the Peruvian Congress to identify and promote projects that exploit renewable energy sources, introduce clean technologies, and promote energy efficiency and the substitution of highly polluting fuels. However, the contribution of renewable energy sources other than hydroelectricity is still very limited in Peru.

=== Hydroelectricity ===
Hydroelectricity is the only renewable resource exploited in Peru. In 2006, it accounted for 48% of total installed capacity and 72% of electricity generated. The largest hydroelectric facility in the country is the 900 MW Mantaro Complex in southern Peru, which is operated by state-owned Electroperu. The two hydroelectric plants at the complex generate over one-third of Peru's total electricity supply. In February 2006, Egecen S.A. completed construction of the 130-MW, Yuncán hydroelectric plant, located northeast of Lima. The plant will be operated by EnerSur, a subsidiary of Brussels-based Suez Energy International.

Construction on the multi-purpose Olmos Transandino Project has been underway since 2006 and in February 2010, the contract for its hydroelectricity power plant is expected to be issued. The power station in northwest Peru's Cajamarca province will have a 600 MW capacity and produce 4,000 GWh annually. Construction of the 406 MW dam on Huallaga River in Chaglla District started in 2012. The 525 MW Cerro del Águila was inaugurated in 2016. In 2012, the Salcca-Pucara hydroelectric project received the last of several approvals it needed.

=== Wind ===
Studies from the National Meteorological and Hydrological Service (SENAMHI) have estimated a total windpower potential of 19 GWh/year for Peru, or about 70% of current electricity consumption. The Departments of Talara, Laguna Grande, Marcona and Pta. Atico are the regions with the largest wind potential. However, the absence of a regulatory framework and of a reliable record of wind potential, together with the lack of human, financial, and technical resources, has so far hindered the exploitation of Peru's windpower potential.

The contribution of wind power to the energy matrix in Peru was negligible in the first decade of the 21st century, with just 0.7 MW of installed capacity in 2006. In 2014 three large wind farms were inaugurated: the 32MW Marcona Wind Farm in the Ica region, the 83MW Cupisnique Wind Farm in Pacasmayo and the 30MW Talara Wind Farm in the Piura region.

A new 260 MW wind farm is being built by Engie at Punta Lomitas. It is expected to be online in 2023.

=== Solar ===
It has been estimated that Peru has favorable conditions for the development of solar energy projects. However, the country's solar potential has not been exploited yet. In the mountain ranges located in the South, solar energy reaches average levels above 6 kWh/m2/day, which are among the highest worldwide.

== Energy efficiency in small and medium-sized enterprises in Peru ==
A study by the Climate and Development Knowledge Network found that despite the high potential for energy cost savings across the private sector, a number of barriers prevent businesses in Peru from identifying and implementing energy efficiency opportunities in their premises and operations.

Energy demand in Peru is expected to continue to increase over the coming decades, largely fuelled by industrial expansion and increasing economic prosperity. The Peruvian Government has, however, recognised the importance of energy efficiency as a key element in climate change mitigation strategy and action, with energy efficiency featuring among the climate change mitigation actions in Peru's Nationally Determined Contribution (NDC) under the Paris Agreement of the United Nations Framework Convention on Climate Change (UNFCCC), and also in Peru's Planning for Climate Change project, known as ‘PlanCC’.

== History of the electricity sector ==
=== Early history ===
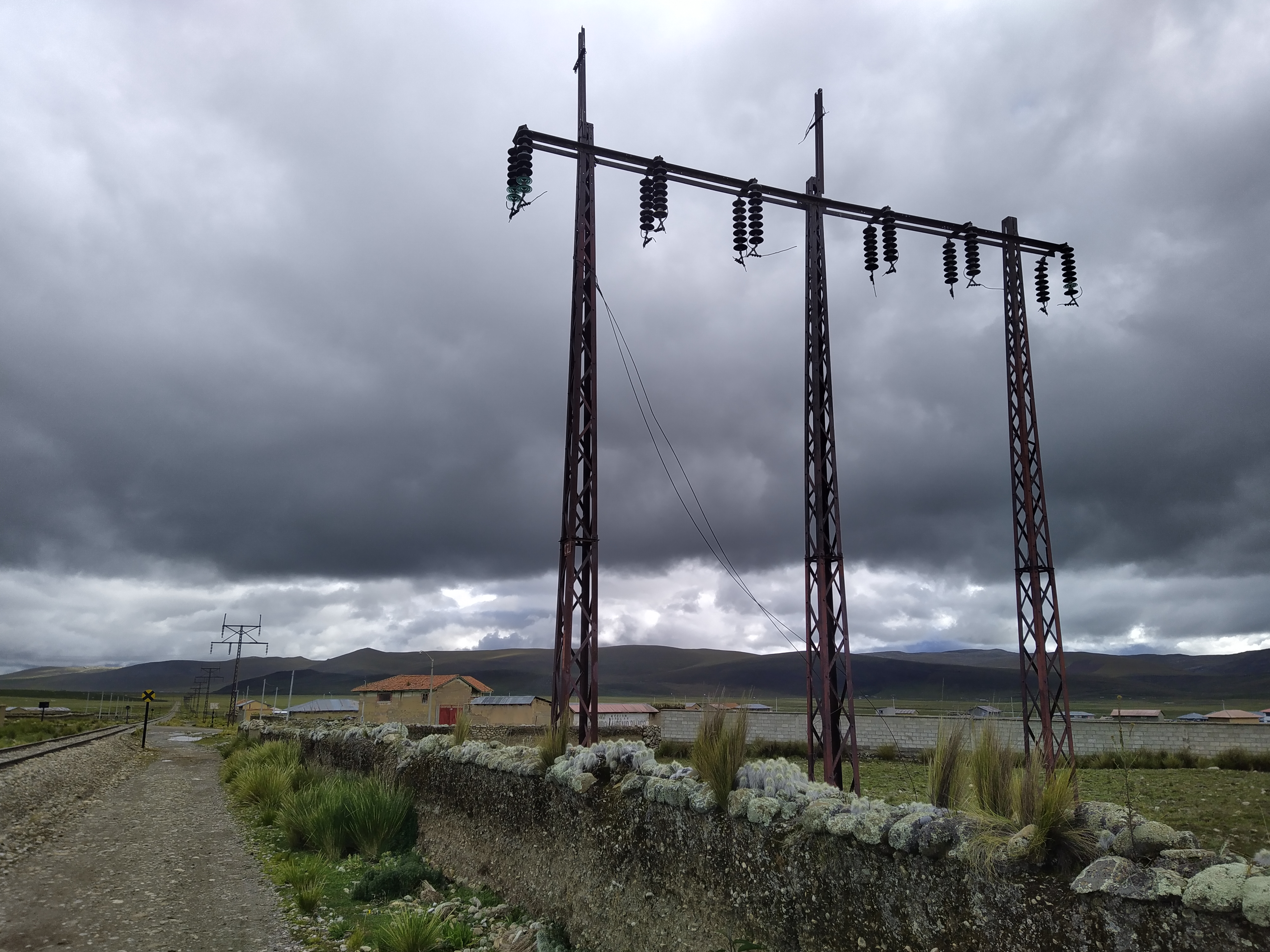
Disused portal pylon in Junín as part of a power line between Malpaso hydroelectric station and the mining town Cerro de Pasco.

One of the first larger hydroelectric power stations went 1914 in to service in La Oroya to supply the increasing power demand of the mining activities of the Cerro de Pasco Copper Corporation. Shortly after a second hydroelectric station was established in Pachachaca. In the late 1930s, two more power stations in Upamayo and Mal Paso were constructed and a local system of overhead power lines was built to connect the hydroelectric stations. The mining sector still was the main consumer of the electric power.

Between 1934 and 1938 the Callahuanca hydroelectric power plant was constructed at the Rimac valley for the power supply of Lima. Back then, only local and regional power grids existed.

From its inception, the national Peruvian electricity system started to be developed by private initiative. In 1955, Law No. 12378 regulated the mechanisms of private participation, establishing a system of concessions with commitments to increase generation capacity by 10% annually. The National Tariff Commission and other mechanisms aiming at guaranteeing the profitability of the investments were then created. However, at the beginning of the 1970s, profound changes took place. In 1972, the de facto military government nationalized the electricity industry through Law No.19521, creating ELECTROPERU (Peru Electricity Company). ELECTROPERU became the owner of all the generation, transmission and distribution assets and came to be in charge of service provision and investment planning. Until the beginning of the 1980s there were large investments in hydroelectric and thermal projects. However, this dynamism started to fade during the 1980s mainly due to the debt crisis that started in 1982 and that precluded new financing in the region. By the beginning of the 1990s, the electricity sector in Peru showed an important deterioration due to low investment in infrastructure, the fact that tariffs did not cover production costs, the restricted investment in maintenance and the systematic destruction of infrastructures by terrorist activities. The results of this crisis were severe: in 1990 only 45% of the population had access to electricity, supply only covered 74% of the demand and distribution losses were above 20%.

The structural reform process that started in 1992 under the government of President Alberto Fujimori led to the privatization of the electricity sector in a decade in which most of the countries in the region underwent a similar process. The restructuring process, articulated in the Electricity Concessions Law (LCE) of 1992, unbundled the vertically integrated state monopoly into generation, transmission and distribution and led the basis for the introduction of private operators and competition for generation and commercialization, with transmission and distribution regulated on the basis of free entry and open access. The 1992 Law was modified by Law No. 26876 (Anti-monopoly and Anti-oligopoly Law) in 1997. The process of concessions and transfer of generation assets to private companies was started in 1994 and relaunched in 2002 as it had not been completed yet.

Private companies emerging from the 1992 reforms made substantial investment commitments that were fulfilled in the following years. Investment figures reached their highest levels in the period 1996–1999, declining afterwards once the commitments had been fulfilled. The high level of investment led to annual average increases in installed capacity of 9.2%, a rate that was not matched by the increase in demand, which increased at only 4.7% per year on average. As a result, the level of reserves in the National Interconnected System (SEIN) increased at average rates of 23.2%. Investments in transmission and distribution led to increases in coverage from 53% in 1993 to 76% in 2004.

=== 2000s developments ===
In September 2000, the Law for the Promotion of Energy Efficiency (Law No. 27345) was approved, declaring support for the efficient use of energy to be in the national interest. The regulation for this Law was approved in October 2007 (by Supreme Decree No. 053-2007-EM). The objectives of the Law are to contribute to energy security, improve the country's competitiveness, generate surplus for exports, reduce environmental impacts, protect consumers and raise awareness about the importance of efficient energy use.

As for rural electrification, there have been several attempts to change the existing institutional and legal framework. In recent years, there have been two laws passed by Congress (the Law for Electrification of Rural and Isolated or Frontier Areas in 2002 and the Law to Regulate the Promotion of Private Investment in Rural Electrification in 2004) but neither of them has been implemented due to conflicts with provisions in other laws.

== Tariffs and subsidies ==
=== Tariffs ===
In 2006, the average residential tariff in Peru was US$0.1046 per kWh, LAC weighted average in 2005 was US$0.115.

In the unregulated market, the average tariff for final customers was US$0.0558 per kWh for the electricity supplied directly from the generators and US$0.0551 per kWh for the electricity supplied by distribution companies.

=== Subsidies ===
Law No. 275010 created, in November 2001, the Electricity Social Compensation Fund (FOSE). This Fund established a cross-subsidy system among consumers that benefits users with monthly consumption below 100kWh through fixed and proportional discounts. The fixed discount applies to consumers between 30 and 100 kWh and the proportional discount is targeted to those with consumptions below 30 kWh. The amount of the discounts is financed through a surcharge in the tariff paid by the regulated consumers with monthly consumptions above 100 kWh.

The number of households that benefit from this scheme is over 2.4 million (out of the 3.6 million connected households at the national level). In July 2004, the FOSE was extended to cover up to 50% of the bill in the National Interconnected System (SEIN) and 62.5% in the isolated systems for the users with consumption below 30kWh, including as well a special focus by geographic location (rural-urban).

(See Evaluation of the FOSE for a detailed analysis of the results of the FOSE.)

== Investment and financing ==
=== Investment by subsector ===
In 2004, annual investment needs in the electricity sector up to 2016 were estimated at US$200 million, considering a projected annual demand increase of 5%.

Total investment in the electricity sector in 2006 was US$480.2 million, which was 22% higher than the amount for 2005. Investment in generation, transmission and distribution added up to US$446.2 million, while investment by the Executive Office for Projects (DEP) in the Rural Electrification was US$34 million. The table below summarizes the contribution of both the private and the public sector:

| Subsector | Private companies | | Public companies | | Total |
| Subsector | Amount USD millions | % of total | Amount USD millions | % of total | Total |
|---|---|---|---|---|---|
| Generation | 260.4 | 90% | 29.2 | 10% | 289.6 |
| Transmission | 16.5 | 100% | — | — | 16.5 |
| Distribution | 73.5 | 52% | 66.5 | 48% | 140.1 |
| Total | 350.5 | | 95.7 | | 446.2 |

Source: Ministerio de Energia y Minas 2007

(See Dirección Ejecutiva de Proyectos Solar PV Rural Electrification Project)

Investment by private companies has taken off after having reached very low numbers by 2003 (US$120 million, matching public investment for that year) after the general decline in investment that happened from 1999 onwards.

==== Investment requirements ====
To meet expected demand, total investment needs in electricity generation and transmission between 2002 and 2030 are estimated to be US$16.2-20.7 million.

=== Financing ===
==== Rural electrification ====
After the power sector reform in the early 1990s, rural electrification in Peru has been limited to direct investment by the central government, without any additional funds from communities, regional governments or service providers. One important issue deterring electricity distribution companies from investing in rural electrification is the fact that they hold concession areas concentrated in small areas around urban centers and are only under the obligation to meet service requests within 100 meters of the existing network.

To expand coverage, the Government of Peru has been spending an average of US$40–50 million per year in the last ten years for electrification. These investments were carried out through social funds (e.g. FONCODES – Cooperation Fund for Social Development) and, to a larger extent, by the Executive Office for Projects (DEP), a division of the Ministry of Energy and Mines (MEM). The DEP, which is currently in the process of being absorbed by the National Rural Electrification Office (DGER), is in charge of planning, designing and constructing the rural electricity systems. Once they are finalized, the rural electricity systems are handed over for operation either to state-owned distribution companies or to a specially created state-owned asset-holding company that manages the systems under operation contracts with state-owned companies, or municipalities.

== Summary of private participation in the electricity sector ==
The structural reform process that started in 1992 unbundled the vertically integrated state monopoly and led to the privatization of the electricity sector. Today, private companies dominate the generation sector with almost 70% of capacity in their hands. Although there are about 40 companies that generate electricity for the market, just 4 of them (EDEGEL S.A.A., Electroperú S.A., Energía del Sur S.A. and EGENOR) account for 70% of the total capacity.

As for transmission, 100% is in the hands of several private companies, while 71% of electricity distributed and 45% of the existing clients were also controlled by private companies.

| Activity | Private participation (%) |
|---|---|
| Generation | 69% of installed capacity, 60% of production |
| Transmission | 100% |
| Distribution | 45% of clients, 71% of electricity distributed |
| Investment | Private participation (%) |
| Generation (2005) | 90% |
| Transmission (2005) | 100% |
| Distribution (2005) | 52% |
| Rural electrification | 0% |

== Electricity and the environment ==
=== Responsibility for the environment ===
The National Environment Commission (CONAM), created in 1994, holds the Environmental responsibilities in Peru and promotes sustainable development. CONAM is a decentralized public agency under the Ministry of the Presidency. Its Management Committee consists of 10 members from the national, regional and local governments; economic sector representatives; NGOs; universities and professional associations. The National Environmental Agenda is the instrument that prioritizes environmental issues identified at the national level.

In 2002, CONAM created the National Climate Change Strategy, which was aimed at transmitting the relevance of Peru's vulnerability to climate change. The main objective was to stress the need to incorporate in the country's policies and programs the necessary adaptation measures and to make the population aware of the existing risks and the actions they can undertake to use resources responsibly. The Program to Strengthen the National Capacity to manage Climate Change and Air Pollution (PROCLIM) was created to implement the aforementioned Strategy. PROCLIM aims to contribute to poverty reduction by promoting the integration of climate change and air quality issues in sustainable development policies.

=== Greenhouse gas emissions ===
OLADE (Latin American Energy Association) estimated that CO_{2} emissions from electricity production in 2003 were 3.32 million tons of CO_{2}, which corresponds to 13% of total emissions from the energy sector.

=== CDM projects in electricity ===
Currently (November 2007), there are seven registered CDM projects in the electricity sector in Peru, with overall estimated emission reductions of 800,020 tCO_{2}e per year.

| Project type | Number | Emission reductions (tCO_{2}e/year) |
|---|---|---|
| Landfill gas | 1 | 298,996 |
| Waste management | 1 | 26,719 |
| Fuel switch | 1 | 25,577 |
| Large hydroelectric | 3 | 434,883 |
| Small hydroelectric | 1 | 13,845 |

Source: UNFCCC

The National Environment Fund FONAM is the focal point for CDM projects in Peru.

== External assistance ==
=== Inter-American Development Bank ===
In November 2022, the Inter-American Development Bank (IDB) announced the approval of a US$125 million loan for a 500-kilovolt power line project connecting the electrical grids of Ecuador and Peru. The European Investment Bank will contribute an additional $125 million to the project. This initiative aims to construct a 544-kilometer line over five years, boosting cross-border transmission capacity to 680 megawatts and promoting a sub-regional electricity market within the Andean Community free trade area. The loan, provided under the IDB's Flexible Financing Facility, has a 23-year term with a 7.5-year grace period and a Secured Overnight Financing Rate (SOFR)-based interest rate. Ecuador's state-owned power company, Corporación Eléctrica del Ecuador (CELEC EP), will provide US$13.62 million in local counterpart funding.

=== World Bank ===
Previously, the World Bank funded a Rural Electrification project in Peru. It was a 6-year project from 2006 to 2012, totaling US$145 million. The World Bank contributed US$50 million in lending, while the Global Environment Facility (GEF) provided a US$10 million grant. The project aimed to increase access to efficient and sustainable electricity services, as well as to improve the quality of life and income generation opportunities in rural areas.

The World Bank approved a loan of US$70 million in September 2021 to finance priority investments in Peru's electricity sector. These investments aim to improve the availability, reliability, and climate resilience of electricity service, particularly in low-income sectors and regions with inadequate or unreliable electricity services. Additionally, the project will promote the development of a greener electricity supply with reduced greenhouse gases and provide technical assistance to support the Peruvian government's energy sector reform for post-pandemic economic recovery. The total project financing amounts to US$95.10 million, with the World Bank providing US$70 million and the Government of Peru contributing US$25.10 million.

== Sources ==
- APEC, 2006. APEC Energy Supply and Demand Outlook 2006.
- Ministerio de Energía y Minas, 2007. Anuario Estadístico Electricidad 2006
- OSINERG, 2005. Reformas Estructurales en el Sector Eléctrico Peruano
- World Bank, 2006: Rural Electrification Project, Project Appraisal Document.

== See also ==
- Peru
- Economy of Peru
- Water supply and sanitation in Peru
- Irrigation in Peru
