= Francesco Starace =

Italian business executive and engineer (born 1955)

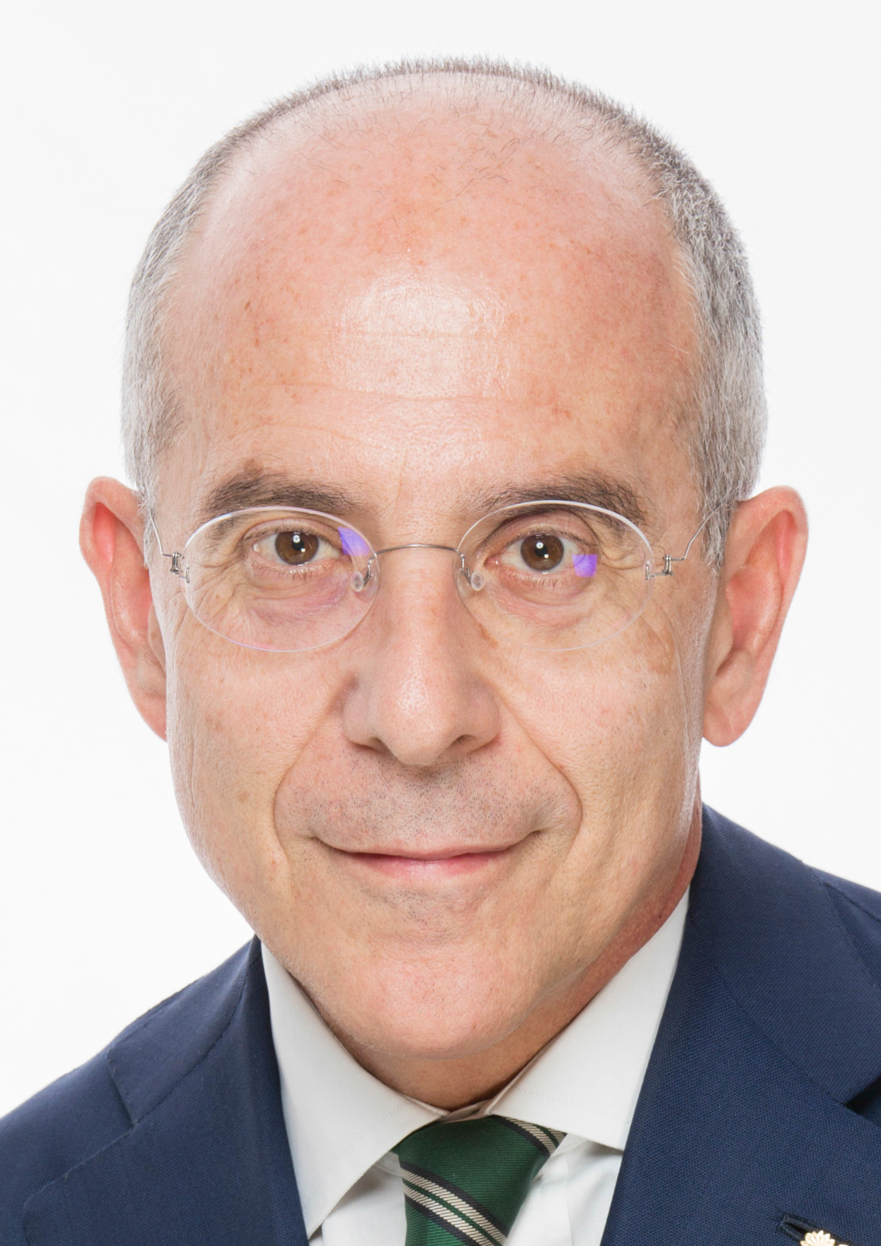
- Starace in 2014
- Born: 22 September 1955 (age 71); Rome, Italy
- Occupation: CEO of Enel
- Website: www.francescostarace.it

Francesco Starace (Italian pronunciation: [franˈtʃesko staˈraːtʃe]; born 22 September 1955) is an Italian business executive, from 2014 to 2023 he was CEO and general manager of Enel Group.

== Life ==
In 1980 he graduated in Nuclear Engineering at the Polytechnic University of Milan.

From 1981 to 1982 he worked as a safety analyst for the nuclear power plants of NIRA Ansaldo. Until 1987 he held a number of managerial positions in SAE SADELMI, a company owned by General Electric, both in Italy and abroad (the US, Saudi Arabia and Egypt).

In 1987 he relocated to ABB. In 1993 he was assigned to the role of Operations Manager for SOIMI, company part of the group ABB SAE SADELMI.

Between 1997 and 1998 he was CEO of ABB Combustion Engineering Italy, and then of Alstom Power, where between 1998 and 2000 he was senior vice president of global sales and turnkey plants in the gas turbine division.

In 2000 he became head of Energy Management at Enel Produzione. While working for the Italian electricity company, between 2002 and 2005, he held the post of head of the Business Power division.

In 2005 he was appointed director of the Italian Market Division of Enel, a division that focused on a free electricity and gas market for homes and private customers.

In December 2008 he was appointed director of the Renewable Energy Division of Enel and CEO of Enel Green Power, the Group's newly formed company dedicated to developing and managing the production of energy from renewable sources in Italy and around the world. During the six years of the Starace management, Enel Green Power established itself as one of the leading global players in the renewable energy sector, with 29 billion kWh generated from 750 plants in 16 countries in Europe, North America and Latin America, and with a mix of well-calibrated green technologies.

In 2014 he was appointed CEO and general manager of Enel. His strategy puts the focus on the industrial side of the business and he has announced the company's plans for the conversion of 23 thermal power plants of the Gruppo Italia (gas turbine, fuel oil, coal).

In March 2015 he met with the Executive Director of Greenpeace International Kumi Naidoo and the president of Greenpeace Italy Andrea Purgatori to share Enel’s plans for the medium/long term.

In May 2015, the Secretary-General of the United Nations Ban Ki-moon has appointed Francesco Starace Member of the United Nations Global Compact.

He held this position for two terms (2015-2018 and 2018-2021): as established by the statute, this is the maximum number of consecutive terms that can be served.

In 2017 he was appointed as new President of Eurelectric, a role he kept till 2019.

From September 2017 to December 2019, the European Commission made him a member of the “Multi-stakeholder Platform on the Implementation of the Sustainable Development Goals in the EU”.

Since September 2019, following an invitation from the Rockefeller Foundation, Mr. Starace became a member of the Global Commission to End Energy Poverty. In January 2020 he became Co-chair of the WEF “Net Zero Carbon Cities - Systemic Efficiency Initiative”. In May 2020 Francesco Starace has been confirmed for a third term in office as CEO at Enel. From June 2020 to December 2021 he was Member of the G20 Business Advisory Board for the Italian Presidency.

In October 2020 he was appointed Chair of the Administrative Board of SEforALL, an international organization that works closely with the United Nations to accelerate and deliver at scale the solutions needed to achieve Sustainable Development Goal 7 (SDG7) by 2030. From December 2020 to December 2021, he was Chair of the B20 ITALY 2021 - “Energy & Resource Efficiency Task Force”. In January 2021 Francesco Starace was appointed co-chair of the European Clean Hydrogen Alliance’s roundtable on “Renewable and low-carbon hydrogen production”.

He is a Member of the Climate and Environment Advisory Council of the European Investment Bank (EIB) Group, as well as a Member of B20 Indonesia 2022 - Taskforce on “Energy, Sustainability and Climate”. He is also Co-Chair of the Italy-Mexico Business Council.

In July 2022, he became a member of Global Leadership Council, an organization of Global Energy Alliance for People and Planet.

== Awards ==
- In 2010 he received, together with Luigi Ferraris, the "Manager Utilities Prize 2010", awarded by Agici and Accenture for managing a world leader industrial project in the field of renewable energy.
- In 2011 he won the "Chess and business strategies" prize, awarded by the homonymous association.
- In 2013 he won the "Sustainable Energy Prize 2013", awarded by Fondazione Energia.
- In 2018 he was awarded the Order of the Aztec Eagle, the highest honor given to foreign citizens in Mexico, for the services offered by Enel, aimed at promoting the sustainable development of the country.
- On 31 May 2018, Mr. Francesco Starace was awarded the Order of Merit for Labour, following the signing of the decree by the President of the Italian Republic.
- In April 2018 Francesco Starace was honored with the Brazilian title of Commander of the Order of Rio Branco. This title recognizes those who have made an especially meritorious contribution to the development of politics, economics and science of the Country.
- In July 2018 Francesco Starace was honored with the title of Commander of the Order of Merit of the Colombian Republic. This title, given by Colombia's Ambassador to Italy Juan Mesa Zuleta, recognizes the positive impact of Enel investment in the country and the commitment of the CEO to sustainable development.
- In 2019 he became Fortune Italy's Businessperson of the year for the Energy sector.
- In December 2019 he was awarded the Global Leadership Award 2019, he was the first Italian and the first representative of the energy sector to receive this award from the University of California Berkeley.
- In 2019 he was awarded the "Manager Utility Energia 2019" prize by the quarterly magazine "Management delle Utilities e delle Infrastrutture (MUI)".
- In 2020 Francesco Starace ranked first as the "best utility manager" in the Institutional Investor's ranking
- In 2021 he received the Tiepolo Award, which was established in 1996 by the Italian Chamber of Commerce and Industry for Spain, in collaboration with the Madrid Chamber of Commerce and Industry and the Confederación Española de Organizaciones Empresariales - CEOE.
- In 2021 he also received the “Rome Award for the country’s development”, which is awarded to “personalities from the world of economics, science, society and culture, who have been particularly distinguished for their contribution to the growth and prestige of the country”.

== Honours ==
Cavaliere del Lavoro – 31 May 2018

== Controversies ==
He said that to change a company it's necessary to "physically destroy" centres of power that oppose change, "hitting" them so "to spark fear in the organization". He later apologized with a letter to Enel's employees.

In early 2022, Francesco came under criticism for meeting in person with acting President of Russia Vladimir Putin to discuss massive Russian investments & sanction exemptions, just over a week prior to the 2022 Russian invasion of Ukraine.

== Publications ==
- Starace, Francesco (1 July 2000). "The Utility Industry in 2020". In Bausch, Andreas; Schwenker, Burkhard (eds.). Handbook Utility Management. Springer Science & Business Media. ISBN 9783540793496.

== Bibliography ==
- Wind Power: The Struggle for Control of a New Global Industry, Ben Backwell, Routledge, 19 September 2014, ISBN 9781317685418
- National Monopoly to Successful Multinational: the Case of Enel, Massimo Bergami, Pier Luigi Celli, Giuseppe Soda, Palgrave Macmillan, 29 November 2012, ISBN 9781137033901
- Windpower Monthly Newsmagazine, Volume 26, Forlaget Vistoft, 2010
- E dopo? Energie rinnovabili per tutti, Luca Reteuna, Effata Editrice, 2009, ISBN 9788874024940
