= Franco Tatò =

Italian businessman (1932–2022)

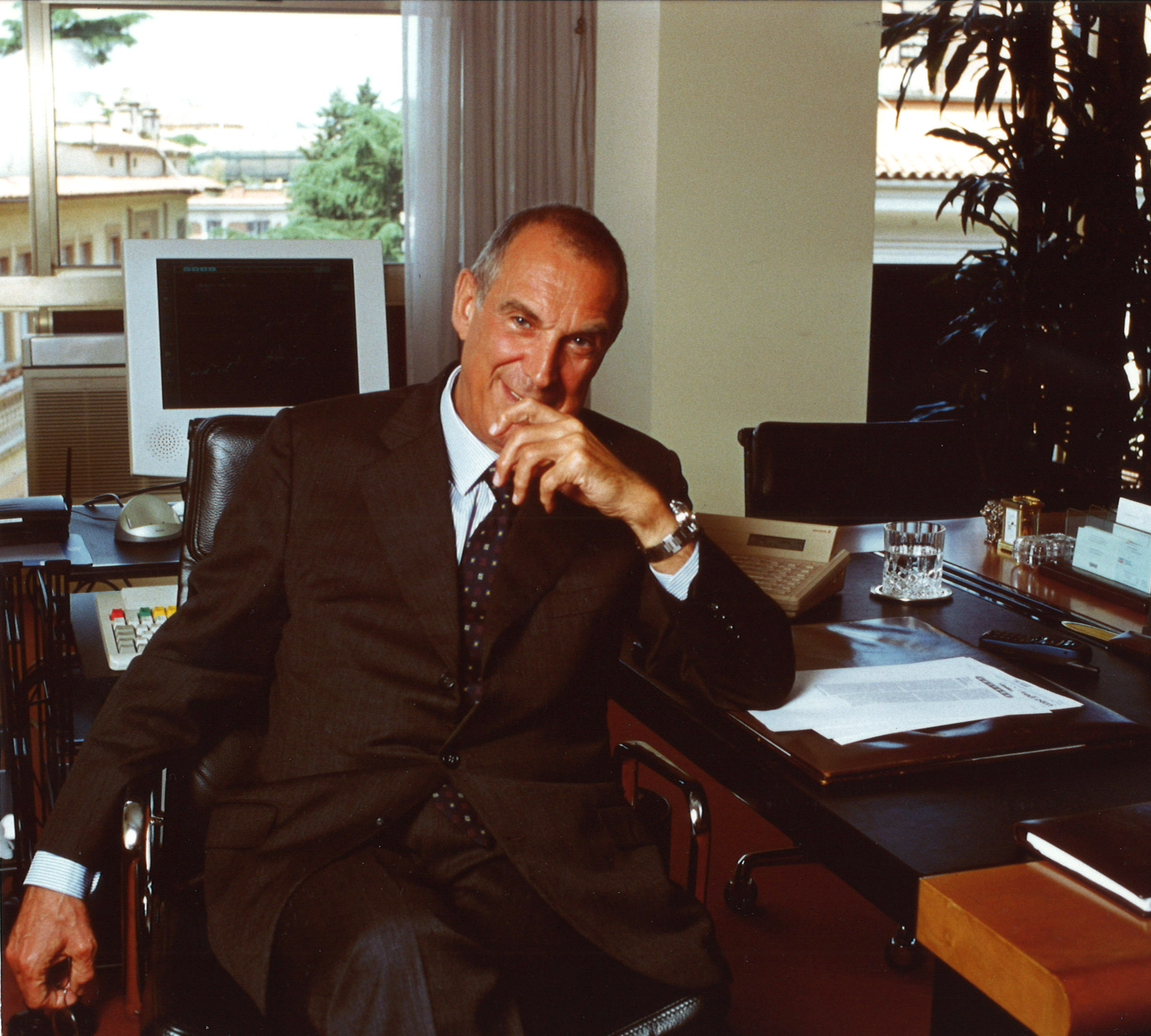

Chairman of RCS Group
- In office 19 September 2002 – 23 April 2003
- Preceded by: Nicolò Nefri
- Succeeded by: Guido Roberto Vitale

Chairman of Enel Group
- In office 24 May 2002 – 12 May 2005
- Preceded by: Enrico Testa
- Succeeded by: Piero Gnudi

CEO of Enel
- In office June 1996 – 24 May 2002
- Appointed by: Romano Prodi
- Preceded by: Alfonso Limbruno
- Succeeded by: Paolo Scaroni

Personal details
- Born: 12 August 1932 Lodi, Italy
- Died: 2 November 2022 (aged 90) San Giovanni Rotondo, Italy
- Spouse: Sonia Raule (m. 2002)
- Children: Carolina
- Education: Ghislieri College
- Profession: Business manager; Writer
- Nickname: "Kaiser Franz"

Francesco Tatò (12 August 1932 – 2 November 2022) was an Italian businessman. He was known as "Kaiser Franz" for the tough management methods he used to achieve economic turnarounds at the companies where he was appointed CEO. He was married to Italian writer and television author and producer Sonia Raule.

== Education ==
Tatò obtained a philosophy degree from the University of Pavia, Ghislieri College, with a dissertation in theoretical philosophy on Max Weber; Enzo Paci was his dissertation advisor. Economically independent thanks to obtaining a scholarship, he decided to continue his education with two years of study in Munich and Münster, Germany; he then went on to study at Harvard, holding a Fulbright scholarship.

== Olivetti (1956–1990) ==
In 1956, at the age of 24, Tatò began his long rise through the ranks at the Olivetti Group, where for the first six months he worked on the assembly line at the company's Ivrea plant. "I personally consider that period to be one of the most useful for me in a formative sense, because working on the assembly line helped me to understand the priorities and the values of the people who worked there." After joining Olivetti in 1956, Tatò climbed the corporate ladder until he reached the top management. The company tasked him with returning troubled foreign subsidiaries to health. From 1970 to 1973 he was CEO of Austro Olivetti in Vienna, Austria. From 1974 to 1976 he worked as CEO of British Olivetti in London. These were to be the first of many similar assignments.

=== Time in Germany ===
In 1976 Tatò returned to Germany as CEO of Deutsche Olivetti GmbH in Frankfurt, where he remained until 1980 when he was appointed Director of Foreign Sales for the Olivetti Group. Tatò left Olivetti temporarily from 1982 to 1984. He took the job as CEO of the Mannesmann-Kienzle Group in Villingen-Schwenningen, Germany. In 1986 he returned to Olivetti with the task of restructuring Triumph-Adler, a company with over 9,000 employees which had built up a significant business in the office equipment and computer sector and which had just been purchased by the Italian company from Volkswagen. In just two years Tatò was able to turn the company around thanks to strict cost-cutting policies and reorganization measures to boost production efficiency and launch technologically innovative products.

=== End of Tatò's time at Olivetti ===
Tatò spent 1989 and 1990 at the head of Olivetti Office, a division specialized in the production and worldwide sale of office equipment and computers. The sector was in the depths of a profound crisis in this period. At the end of the year, due to growing organizational and strategic disagreements with the head of the group, Carlo De Benedetti, Francesco Tatò and Olivetti agreed to split; in the eyes of the public and in reality this was not an amicable agreement. In August 2012 Tatò had this to say when questioned by a journalist about Olivetti's demise and disappearance from the world IT market:

"Olivetti was a splendid example of technologically and socially advanced industry in post-war Italy. [...] Few companies followed its example, and as a matter of fact it was roundly criticized by the business establishment of the time. Many very talented managers with international experience got their start in Olivetti. In the late seventies and early eighties, with the first crisis behind it, what we might call Adriano Olivetti's unmanaged legacy, it had to adapt and compete with the entrance of electronics in the office equipment market and with the organizational upheaval of the business caused by the development and runaway success of the personal computer. Above all, during Carlo De Benedetti's management, the company got all its technological choices wrong and was unable to take advantage of the huge potential of its sales organization and the young and talented technicians it had at its disposal. [...] what destroyed one of the biggest Italian companies was blind management and a product strategy which was wrong for many years. I cannot pretend I was not opposed to this, and indeed I was fired when Olivetti Office, the sector I was responsible for, returned a profit, just like all the Olivetti subsidiaries which I had overseen first hand. For Olivetti, just like any other company, the results are what counts: look at the results against the names of the managers, anything else is just gossip and hearsay. It was painful to see for those of us who had believed in the company until the last, and a great loss for the whole of Italy."

— Interview by Vincenzo Pascale, 12 August 2012.

=== Mondadori ===
Tatò had his first experience in the world of publishing before his time at Triumph Adler. From 1984 to 1986 he took the helm of the major Italian publisher Arnoldo Mondadori Editore. In the space of a few months he became vice president and CEO.

== Positions in Silvio Berlusconi's companies (Mondadori, Fininvest) ==
Tatò's relationship with Silvio Berlusconi began in 1991, two years before Berlusconi's entry on the political scene: the future prime minister of Italy would become the most influential man in Italian politics for fifteen years around the turn of the millennium. Rather than shared politics or ideals, it was a respect for his reputation as a hard-nosed company troubleshooter which drove Berlusconi to entrust him with the reins of some of the most important companies in his economic empire at delicate moments. The day that Tatò was named CEO of Fininvest in 1993, the "Cavaliere" said of him jokingly: "When I run into him in the corridor, I'm always afraid he looks at me as a cost to be cut!" Tatò had much stormier relationships with other key players in Silvio Berlusconi's empire in that period: these included Marcello Dell'Utri, Fedele Confalonieri, Adriano Galliani and Giancarlo Foscale. It was precisely the "problematic coexistence with several close and immovable aides of Berlusconi" which drove Tatò to accept the post of CEO of Italian energy giant Enel when offered the position by the Prodi government in 1996; he did so "with relief", and this would mark the end of his working relationship with the ex-premier's companies.

=== Return to Mondadori ===
Tatò was called to head up Mondadori for the second time in 1991, this time by Silvio Berlusconi. His reputation as a corporate troubleshooter led Berlusconi to entrust him with the restructuring of the Italian publishing giant after his disputed acquisition of the company from Carlo De Benedetti's CIR. He remained as Mondadori CEO until 1996, alongside his position as CEO of the Fininvest group.

=== Fininvest (1993–1995) ===
In October 1993 Tatò also took on the role of CEO of the Fininvest Group, where he would remain until February 1995, and in May 1994 he added vice president of Arnoldo Mondadori Editore S.p.A. to his list of positions. At the time of Tatò's arrival at Fininvest, Berlusconi's group was the second most indebted company in Italy (debts of 3.4 times the share capital). Many of the major Italian banking groups, who were creditors of Fininvest, saw the arrival of "Kaiser Franz" at the head of the company as a positive development. For his part, Tatò was able to clean up the Fininvest balance sheet, which was performed primarily by listing Mondadori on the stock exchange and streamlining the organization along with substantial cost reductions. These operations provided the resources the company needed to get out of the hole it had found itself in. Tatò returned to concentrating exclusively on Mondadori for another year, until in 1996 he was called on to head up one of Italy's largest public companies, Enel.

== ENEL (1996– 2002) ==
With his appointment at Enel, which arrived from the Romano Prodi government in 1996, Tatò became one of the key figures in the privatization of Italian state industry. He had this to say in an interview about his experience at Enel:

"Back in '96, Enel was a state behemoth with 96,000 employees which turned a modest profit by providing a service which was often unacceptable, and was still tainted by the stench of tangentopoli. In a short time we were able to separate the main businesses in corporate and accounting terms, list the company on the Milan and New York stock exchanges after downsizing 30,000 employees, we sold three electricity generation companies and created the Italian electricity market, we founded Enel Green Power, a world leader in renewable energy, we made our first foreign acquisition by buying the Spanish utility company Viesgo, we founded Wind, the third largest cellphone service provider in Italy, and developed the first electronic meter, installing 30 million of them, and much more besides. I left a highly profitable company with highly competent managers. I feel I need to point these things out, because sometimes people forget that great transformations are possible in Italy, too."

As head of Enel he cut the 96,000 employees to 70,000, worked to turn the ex-state electricity monopoly into a leading modern services company, and to transform Enel's "users" into "customers". One of the missions Tatò pursued while heading up Enel was to diversify the services provided by the ex-state monopoly to offset its giving up significant market share to competitors in the newly formed free electricity market. In a certain sense Tatò worked to prepare the company for the impact of the liberalization of the Italian energy market, at the same time working towards the goal of achieving multi-utility diversification for the ex-state giant. Privatization of the company began under his management, with 32 percent of the company's capital being sold on the stock market and achieving a good price.

In 1998 Enel entered the Italian cellular telephony market alongside strategic partners France Telecom and Deutsche Telekom. The result was Wind, the third largest Italian cellular service provider. In 2000, Wind acquired ISP Infostrada. Enel quickly expanded further into the utilities sector with Enel.Hydro for water and Camuzzi Gazometri for gas, as well as renewable energy (Erga, later Enel Green Power), plant engineering (EnelPower), real estate (Sei) and training (Sfera). In 1999 the commitment to exploiting the group's unrealized capacities and expertise continued, along with the process of company spin-offs. The results included leaders in their respective sectors such as Erga (renewable energy), later Enel Green Power, which would be responsible for significant expansion into foreign markets. This was followed by EnelPower (plant engineering), Sei (real estate), Sfera (training), and Terna, operator of the electricity grid across the whole of Italy and in Brazil.

Tatò set in motion a process of modernization of Enel's technologies and communications. Examples of this include computerization of customer communications (the web portal Enel.it) which allows customers to provide readings, pay bills and take out and modify energy supply contracts; the development of technology for a WebTv system, distance learning and data transmission over electrical wiring. With Enel Trade the company developed a one-to-one relationship with industrial customers, but maybe the most important aspect was the development of the electronic meter, which allows remote reading and different rate bands, of which 33,000,000 have been installed. With the sale of three generating companies totaling 15000 MW, the foundations for the free electricity market in Italy were formed. "I am leaving a gold mine," Tatò said at the end of his time in Enel. Under his guidance, the ex-state electricity company went from earnings of 1.15 billion Euros in 1995 to 4.22 billion Euros in 2000, with the privatization process begun and diversification of the company successfully conducted. In 2002, when the treasury department of Berlusconi's government, led by Giulio Tremonti, did not renew his contract as CEO of Enel, Tatò had to start looking for other positions in a politically hostile environment.

== Other business positions ==
From September 2002 to April 2003 Tatò was president of Hdp – Holding di Partecipazioni industriali (currently RCS MediaGroup S.p.a.);

From June 2002 to April 2009 he was a director for Prada Holding Milan;

From June 2005 to June 2006 he was CEO of Cartiere P.Pigna, another successful turnaround;

From June 2007 to October 2009 he was president and CEO of IPI Spa Turin;

From October 2009 to June 2010 he was president and CEO of Mikado Film.

=== Treccani (2003–2014) ===
Between 2003 and 2014 Tatò was CEO of the Treccani Istituto della Enciclopedia Italiana, a prestigious cultural institution barely surviving in the difficult market dominated by Google and Wikipedia. During his tenure over a million articles of the different encyclopedias were digitally stored in a huge database and made available to the general public free of charge via the portal www.treccani.it. The portal also features a series of cultural and educational services, an authoritative webTV channel, and Piazza Encyclopedia, a cultural magazine which is also distributed to 245,000 users. The Treccani portal receives around 450,000 visitors per day.

He was president of the board of directors of Fullsix S.p.a.

=== Parmalat (2011–2014) ===
In June 2011 Tatò was appointed president of the board of directors for food group Parmalat. This appointment was proposed by BSA, the holding company of the Besnier family, owner of Lactalis, which holds an 83.03% stake in the company.

=== Berco S.p.a. (2013) ===
In March 2013 he became vice president of the large vehicle component manufacturer Berco, part of the Thyssen Krupp Group and supervised a major restructuring operation.

=== Later career ===
Since 2002 Director of the Coesia Group of Bologna (previously Csii Industrie Spa and Gidsi spa).

He was also a member of the steering committee of XY-WORLDWIDE and chairman of the board of Consultinvest Partecipazioni SpA.

== Essays and publications ==
In 1992 Tatò published Autunno tedesco – Cronaca di una ristrutturazione impossibile (German Autumn – Diary of an impossible restructuring, Sperling & Kupfer, 1992) which won the Tevere nonfiction prize; in 1995 he published the interview book A scopo di lucro (For Profit) with Giancarlo Boselli, deputy editor of l'Unità newspaper; in the same year Essere competitivi. Le esperienze di due protagonisti (Being Competitive: the Experiences of two Main Players), written with the CEO of New Holland, Riccardo Ruggeri, was released; Perché la Puglia non è la California (Why Apulia is not California, Baldini & Castoldi) was published in 2000, followed by Diario tedesco. La Germania prima e dopo il Muro (German Diary: Germany before and after the Wall, Baldini Castoldi Dalai) in 2004, which updated the 1992 volume by describing the process of unification after the fall of the Berlin wall and the difficulties and opportunities caused by the integration which had led to an ever-increasing expansion into Eastern Europe.

Preceded by Chicco Testa	President of the Enel Group; 24 May 2002 – 12 May 2005	Succeeded by Piero Gnudi
Preceded by Nicolò Nefri	President of RCS Editori; 19 September 2002 – 23 April 2003	Succeeded by Guido Roberto Vitale
