= Chicco Testa =

Italian politician

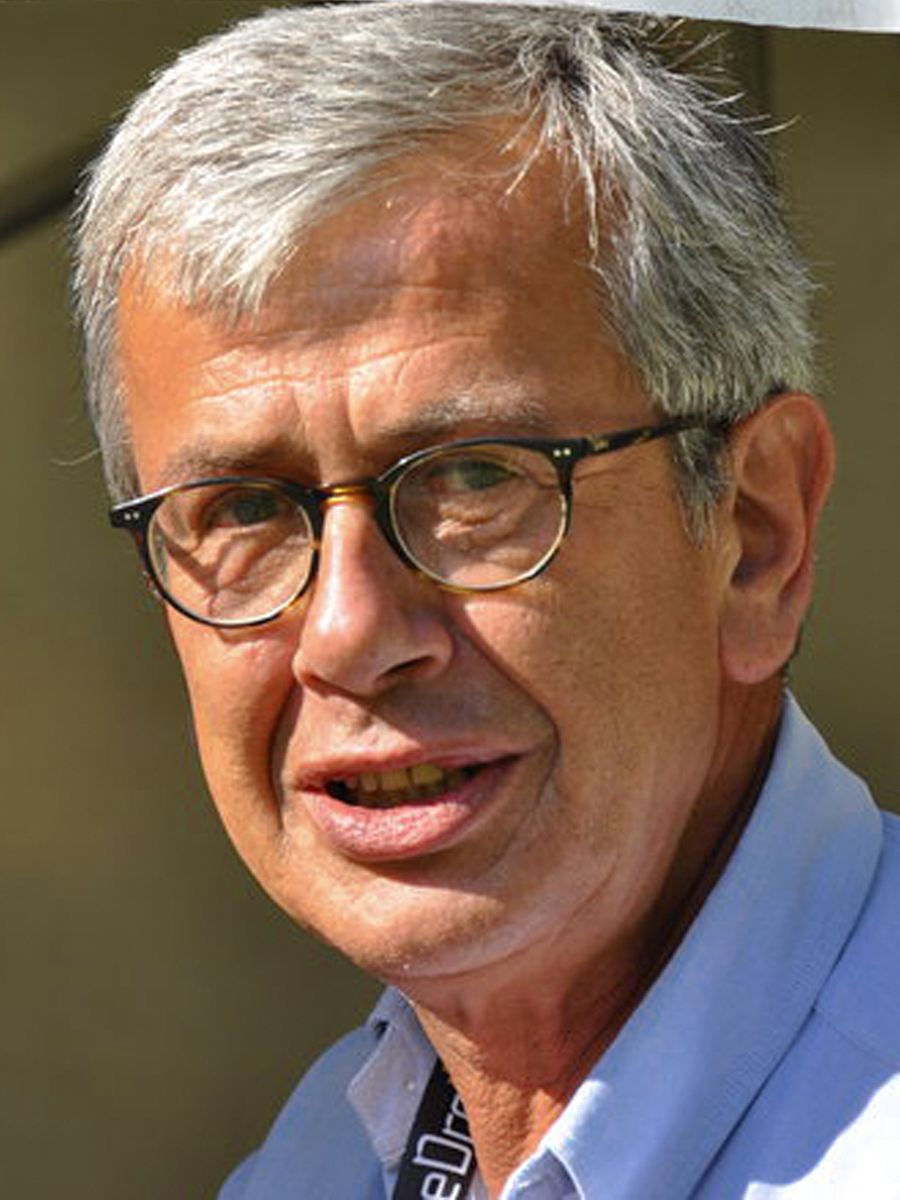
Testa in 2010

Chicco Testa (born 5 January 1952) is an Italian politician. Born in Bergamo, he graduated in philosophy at the Università Statale in Milan (1976). He lives in Rome and has two sons.

== Environmentalist and politician for PCI and PDS ==
From 1980 to 1987, Testa was national secretary and then national president of Legambiente environmentalist association. As such, Testa leads the environmentalist mobilisation in Italy after the Chernobyl disaster, reaching its high in the manifestation of 10 May 1986 with more than 200,000 people. More than 1 million signatures are gathered to present a 1987 anti-nuclear referendum, following which Italian nuclear plants were decommissioned.

From 1987 to 1994, for two legislatures, he was elected to the Italian Chamber of Deputies in the lists of the Italian Communist Party (PCI) in 1987 and of the Democratic Left Party (PDS) in 1992, seating in the parliamentary commission for the environment and the territory.

From 1994 to 1996, he was Chairman of the Board of ACEA (Rome’s Electricity and Water Co.).

== Management activities ==
From 1996 to 2002, he was chairman of the board of Enel, the most important Italian electrical company. During this period, Enel was privatised (Europe’s largest-ever IPO of 15 billion Euro) and in 1997 there was the start-up of Wind, the third TLC Italian Company in which Testa was elected member of the Board of Directors.

From 2002 to 2004, he was a member of the board of directors of the Riello group, an Italian leading company in heating systems and appliances.

From 2002 to 2005, he was member of the advisory board of Carlyle Europe, affiliate of The Carlyle Group (Private Equity), chairman of the board of directors of STA Spa (The Mobility Agency of the City of Rome) and Chairman of the Kyoto Club (non-profit organization whose purpose is the achievement of the objectives set by the Kyoto Protocol).

At present, Testa is managing director of Rothschild Spa. Also, he is a member of the board of directors of Allianz Spa, chairman of the board of Telit Communications Plc and chairman of the board of E.V.A. – Energie Valsabbia – a company developing hydropower generation plants. He has also been chairman of the organising committee of the 20th World Energy Congress, promoted by World Energy Council and held in Rome in November 2007.

== Journalistic and academic activities ==
Testa is a journalist and he contributes to some of the most important daily and weekly Italian newspapers.

He was a lecturer at the LUISS School of Management in Rome (MBA Program Economics and Management in Public Utilities) and he was Lecturer at the Universities of Macerata and Naples in Economic and Environmental subjects.

Together with Fabio Corsico and Gianni Lo Storto, he's member of the board of "Formiche" (Ants), a printed and online cultural and editorial magazine dealing with politics, economics, geographic, environmental and cultural issues, established in 2004 by Paolo Messa.

== Lobbyist for the return to nuclear power in Italy ==
In 2008, he wrote a book Tornare al Nucleare?, L'Italia, l'energia, l'ambiente (Back to Nuclear Energy? Italy, Energy, Environment), published by Einaudi.

Since July 2010, Testa has been Chairman of the Forum Nucleare Italiano (FNI, or Italian Nuclear Forum): a non-profit organisation comprising industrialists and universities, with the aim of reviving the public opinion debate about nuclear energy, to which Italy renounced in 1987 after a referendum. All the major energy industries, as well as some universities and a pair of centrist trade unions, are taking part in the FNI: Alstom power, Ansaldo nucleare, Areva, Confindustria, E.On, Edf, Edison, Enel, Federprogetti, Flaei-Cisl, GDF Suez, Politecnico di Milano, Sapienza University of Rome, SOGIN, Stratinvest Energy, Techint, Technip, Tecnimont, Terna, Uilcem, Università di Genova, Università di Palermo, Università di Pisa, Westinghouse.
