= Luigi Ferraris =

Luigi Ferraris may refer to:

- Luigi Ferraris (politician) (1813–1900), Italian politician
- Luigi Ferraris (footballer) (1887–1915), Italian footballer, engineer and soldier
- Luigi Ferraris (businessman) (born 1962), Italian businessman
- Stadio Luigi Ferraris, a multi-use stadium in Genoa, Italy
