= Andrea Palladio power station =

Former coal-fired power station in Veneto, Italy

Coordinates: 45.4306°N 12.2467°E

Andrea Palladio power station was a coal-fired power station in Veneto, Italy owned by Enel.

Its coal-fired units 1 and 2 were decommissioned in 2021. Units 3 and 4 burned refuse waste. It is planned to build a new combined cycle gas power plant on the site.

Fusina hydrogen power station, a pilot hydrogen-fueled power plant, was built nearby, but was decommissioned in 2018.
