= Yavero River =

Yavero River Río Paucartambo
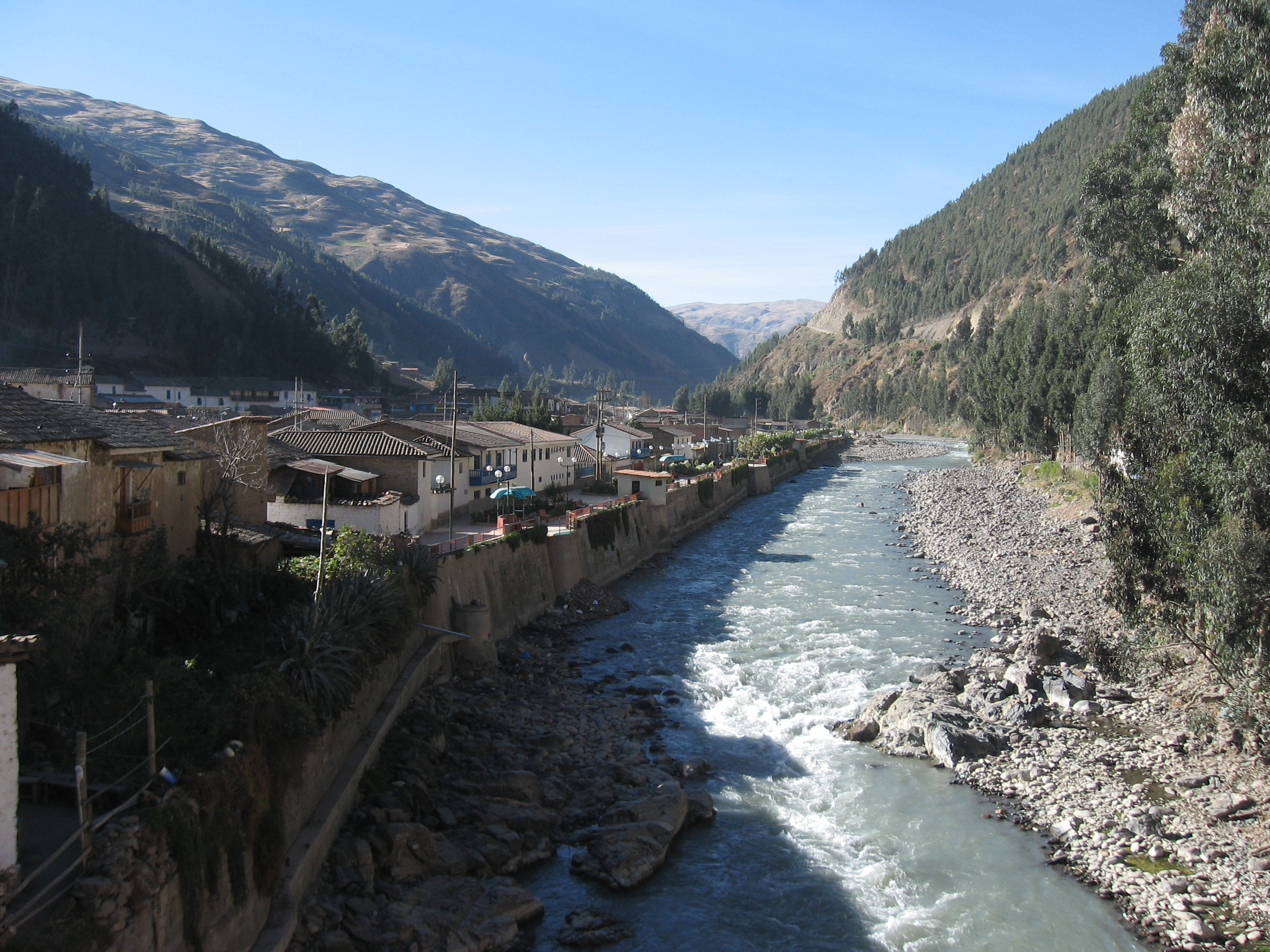
- Native name: Río Yavero (Spanish)

Location
- Country: Peru

Physical characteristics
- Source
  - coordinates: 13.2291°S 71.4848°W
  - elevation: 3,899.9 metres (12,795 ft)
- Mouth: Urubamba River
  - coordinates: 12.3530°S 72.8713°W
- Length: 349 km (217 mi)

The Yavero River is a river in Peru. It is a right-bank tributary of the Urubamba River which is part of the Amazon Basin.

== Drainage basin ==
The Río Yavero drainage basin covers about 5,400 km². It is elongated along the river and reaches a maximum width of about 40 km. It borders the Río Urubamba basin to the west and the Río Madre de Dios basin to the east. To the north, it borders the basins of the Río Yuyato and Río Ticumpinia, tributaries of the Urubamba.
