= Paolo Scaroni =

Italian businessman

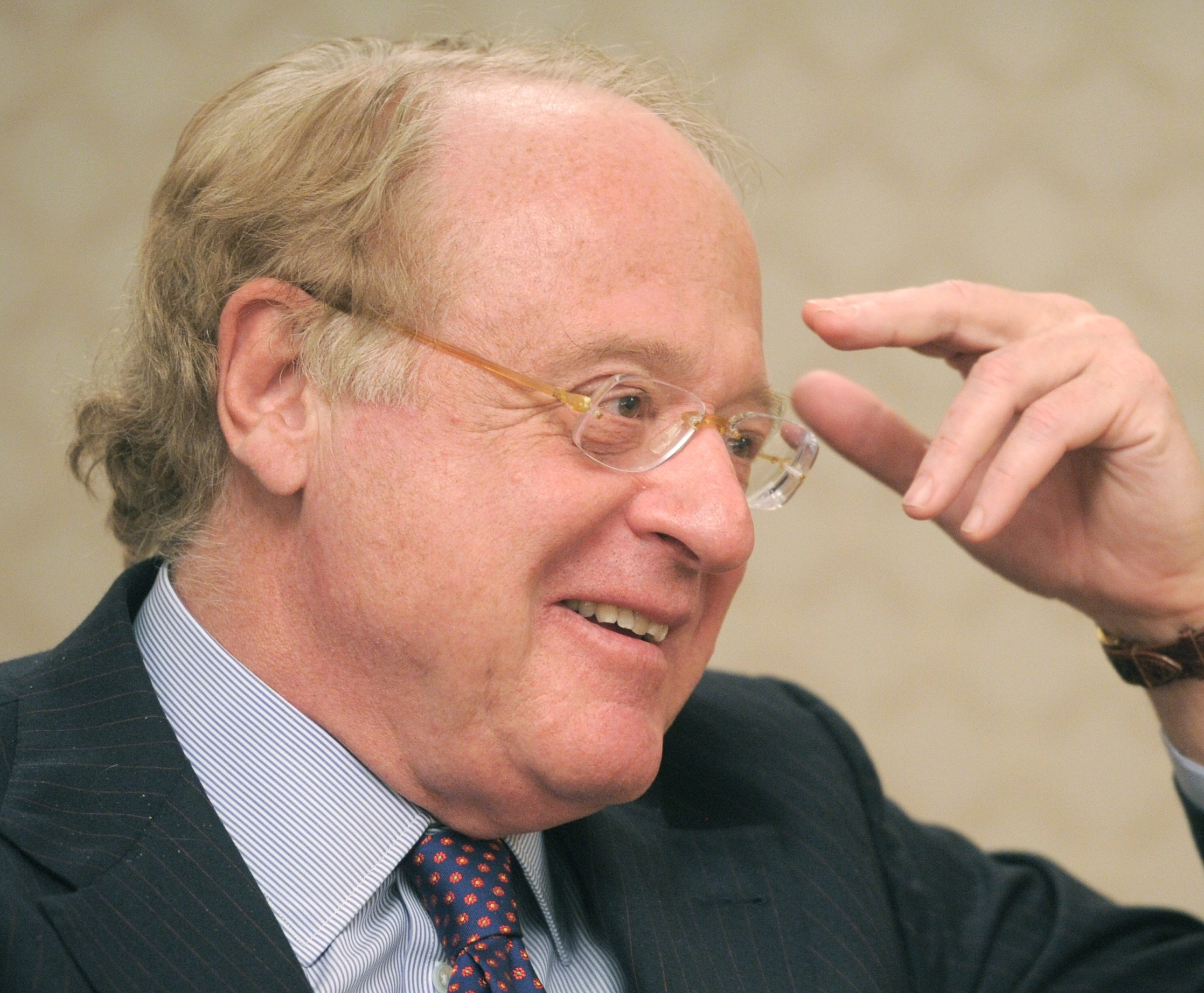
- Born: 28 November 1946 (age 79); Vicenza, Italy
- Education: Bocconi University; Columbia Business School
- Occupation: Businessman
Board member of
| Enel | (CEO, 2002–2005) |
| Eni | (CEO, 2005–2014) |
| AC Milan | (Board of Directors 2017–2018), (Chairman 2018–) |
| Enel | (Chairman, 2023–) |

Paolo Scaroni (born 28 November 1946) is an Italian businessman and banker, currently the chairman of Enel and AC Milan. Between 2002 and 2014 he was the CEO (chief executive officer) of Italian energy companies Enel and Eni.

== Education ==
In 1969, Scaroni graduated from Bocconi University of Milan in the field of economics. In 1973, he obtained an MBA from Columbia Business School.

== Career ==
In 1969, Scaroni joined Chevron Corporation for three years. After obtaining MBA, he was an associate at McKinsey & Company. In 1973, Scaroni joined Saint-Gobain, where he held different positions, culminating with his appointment as president of flat glass division. In 1985, he was appointed CEO of Techint. In 1996, he moved to the United Kingdom to become chief executive officer of Pilkington.

=== Enel and Eni ===
From May 2002 to May 2005, Scaroni served as CEO of Enel, Italy's leading electricity company. At Enel, he made a real breakthrough by abandoning the traditional multi-utility corporate model, supported by his predecessor Franco Tatò, in favour of placing greater focus on the core energy business. Under his mandate, Enel created a separate wind energy unit and, for the first time, Enel was included in the Dow Jones Sustainability Index. In 2005, he was appointed CEO of ENI, the Italian multinational energy company, considered one of the seven world supermajors. In his nine years at ENI, Scaroni reduced the weight of oil in favour of natural gas, seen as an intermediate transition combustible in the path toward even more sustainable sources. In 2012, Eni was included in the Carbon Performance Leadership Index, which scores companies based on their commitment to transparency and environmental leadership. During Scaroni's tenure, ENI's net worth increased from €39 billion to €61 billion. He left his role in 2014.

=== AC Milan ===
On 21 July 2018, Scaroni became chair (Italian: presidente) of AC Milan, after the club was taken over by Elliott Management Corporation. He was one of the eight directors of the club after the takeover by Li Yonghong. In June 2020, Li accused Scaroni of having a conflict of interest in the club's management. Among other issues, Li cited Scaroni's position as deputy chairman of Rothschild Italia (which advised on the acquisition of the club), as well as his prior business relationship with Elliott. AC Milan won the Scudetto Serie A in 2021–2022 with Scaroni as President of AC Milan on 22 May 2022, and he was confirmed in his position as chairman in September 2022, following the acquisition of Milan by US fund RedBird.

=== Other current and past roles ===
In addition to his executive management position, Scaroni, has or has had numerous non-executive roles, amongst which:

- Deputy Chairman of Rothchild & Co.
- Vice Chairman of the London Stock Exchange
- Chairman of Giuliani Group srl
- Chairman of Sicura SpA
- Chairman of Alliance Unichem
- President of Vicenza
- board member of Veolia Environment
- board member of BAE Systems
- board member of ABN AMRO
- board member of Alstom
- board member of Assicurazioni Generali
- Member of Board of Overseers of Columbia Business School
- Member of Board of Overseers of Fondazione Teatro La Scala
- Member of International Advisory Council of Bocconi University

== Political and economic views ==
Scaroni has never taken political positions supporting one particular party or coalition, and is considered as having excellent relationship and supporters across the political spectrum.

When questioned on energy transition and sustainability he has often stressed that renewable energy sources alone will not be sufficient to achieve the ambitious CO_{2} reduction goals that Europe has set. According to Scaroni such goals can only be met if, in addition to the use of renewables, a strong emphasis is put on energy efficiency measures and a pervasive reengineering of industrial processes. He also is an advocate of the use of nuclear energy as a way to reduce CO_{2}.

== Honours ==
In 2004, Scaroni was decorated as Cavaliere del Lavoro. In November 2007 Scaroni was decorated as a member of the Légion d'honneur.

== Tangentopoli ==
In his career Scaroni has been involved in a few judicial proceedings. As part of the massive "Tangentopoli" scandal that brought down Italy's post-war political parties, in 1996, he was sentenced to one year and four months in prison (below the limit of execution of the sentence), and the offence was finally declared extinct by Milan tribunal in 2001.

Subsequently, in his roles as CEO of ENEL and ENI, Scaroni was involved in three judicial investigations (ENEL Porto Tolle, ENI/Saipem Algeria, ENI/Shell Nigeria) but, on those, he was definitively acquainted in 2017, 2020, and 2022 respectively.
