= Fusina hydrogen power station =

Power plant near Venice, Italy, 2008–2010

- Country: Italy
- Location: Fusina, Veneto
- Coordinates: 45°25′51″N 12°14′44″E
- Status: Operational
- Construction began: 2008
- Commission date: 2010
- Construction cost: €50 million
- Owner: Enel

Thermal power station
- Primary fuel: Hydrogen
- Combined cycle?: Yes

Power generation
- Make and model: GE (Nuovo Pignone)
- Nameplate capacity: 16 MW
- Capacity factor: 42%

Fusina hydrogen power station was a hydrogen-fueled power station located in Fusina, near Venice in the Veneto region of Italy. It was the first commercial-scale power station in the world that was fueled with pure hydrogen. The power station was operated by Enel.

The plant only produced energy for less than two years and was decommissioned in 2018.

The Fusina project was launched in 2004. Construction of the power station started in April 2008 and it became operational in August 2009. It was inaugurated on 12 July 2010. The plant is located adjacent to the Andrea Palladio power station. Fusina hydrogen power station has an installed capacity of 12 MW. An additional 4 MW could be generated in the Andrea Palladio Power Station through the reuse of steam produced by the hydrogen-fueled turbine. The power station is equipped by a General Electric combined-cycle gas engine.

The hydrogen is provided from Versalis cracker, and the adjacent petrochemical facility of Porto Marghera.

According to Fulvio Conti, CEO of Enel until May 2014, power produced at the Fusina hydrogen power station is 5–6 times more expensive than conventional electricity.
