= Luigi Roth =

Italian businessman

Luigi Roth (Milan, 1 November 1940) is an Italian business executive.

== Life and career ==
Luigi Roth graduated in Economics and Commerce at Bocconi University in Milan. He started his managerial career at the Pirelli Group and after holding positions as general manager and CEO at several companies, he was appointed CEO at Ernesto Breda SpA in 1986.

Between 1993 and 2001 he was Chairman and CEO at Breda Costruzioni Ferroviarie SpA (Breda Railway Construction).

From 1996 to 1998, he was Chairman at Ferrovie Nord Milano SpA (North Milan Railways), from 1998 to 2000 CEO at Ansaldo Trasporti SpA, and from 2004 to 2007 Vice Chairman at Cassa Depositi e Prestiti.

He was the Chairman of the ‘Fondazione Fiera Milano’ from 2001 to 2009. In 2005, on behalf of the Foundation, he received the EPIC Award (European Property Italian Conference Special Award) for the new transparency policy applied to the planning and management of the International Tender for the redevelopment of the historic Fiera Milano district. During 2007/2008, the sustainability report for the exhibition area, which included initiatives for economic, social and environmental responsibility, was certified as compliant with the international AA1000 Assurance Standard.

From 2006 to 2009 he was Vice Chairman of Terna Participações S.A., a subsidiary of Terna S.p.A. From 2005 to 2014 he was Chairman of Terna SpA.

Since 2007 he has been an independent Board Member at the Pirelli Group, and since May 2012 he has been Chairman of Alba Leasing SpA.

He has been a Member of the National Board of Confindustria since May 2013, representing ANIE.

== Honors and awards ==
- Knight of the Order of Merit for Labour
- Knight Grand Cross of the Order of Merit of the Italian Republic
- Knight of Honor of the Order of St. George
