= 2i Rete Gas =

Italian gas distribution operator

- Type: Società per azioni
- Industry: Utilities (natural-gas distribution)
- Headquarters: Milan, Italy
- Key people: Michele Enrico De Censi (CEO)
- Revenue: €846m, including €116m for IFRIC 12 effect (2013)
- Number of employees: 2,042
- Parent: F2i – F2i Reti Italia
- Website: www.2iretegas.it

Headquartered in Milan, 2i Rete Gas is the second largest gas distribution operator and the only independent player in the gas distribution sector in Italy, with a widespread and diversified network of concession over the whole Italian territory, a market share of approximately 17% and more than 3.8m customers served.

The company is controlled by three infrastructure funds, F2i One, F2i Two (72% combined), an institutional long-term investor, and Ardian (28%), a premium independent private investment company.

In 2013, 2iRG generated €846m revenues (including €116m for IFRIC 12 effect) and €383m EBITDA.

== Key features (main operating data) ==
- Grid extension: 57,000 km
- Regions served: 18 (137 out of 177 Ambiti Territoriali Minimi)
- Municipalities under management: 1,961
- Employees: 2,042

== Historical background ==
In 2000, 2i Rete Gas appeared for the first time as a player in the gas distribution sector with the acquisition of Colombo Gas; in 2002, also Gruppo Camuzzi (approx. 1,000k clients) was acquired. Since September 2009, after the acquisition of Enel Rete Gas by F2i and Axa Private Equity (today ARDIAN), the company has significantly grown from 2.1 m to 3.8m clients (in 2012) thanks to an important consolidation process. In particular, in October 2011 the company's gas networks were reorganized by its shareholders: 2iRG acquired 2iGas Infrastruttura Italiana Gas S.r.l. (formerly E.On Rete S.r.l.), the seventh player in the Italian gas distribution sector (3.2% market share in 2010 in terms of volumes of gas distributed) and G6 Rete Gas S.p.A. (from GdF Suez), the sixth player in the Italian gas distribution sector (4.0% market share in 2010 in terms of volumes of gas distributed).

In December 2013, F2i and Ardian acquired another 14.8% stake in Enel Rete Gas from Enel S.p.A.

As of today, after these acquisitions and an organic growth process, 2i Rete Gas has a market share of 17.2% in terms of volumes of gas distributed with 5.9 billion of m3 of gas distributed and 3.8 million of users in 2,000 municipalities, served through a network of approximately 57,000 km.

The company operates throughout the national territory and has a dominant position in North-West and South-East Italy. The objective of the company is to consolidate and strengthen the Italian gas distribution market, which is currently very fragmented, being organized into aggregations of Ambiti Territoriali Minimi (ATEM).

At the beginning of 2014, Enel Rete Gas was renamed 2i Rete Gas SpA.
