= Luigi Ferraris (businessman) =

Italian businessman

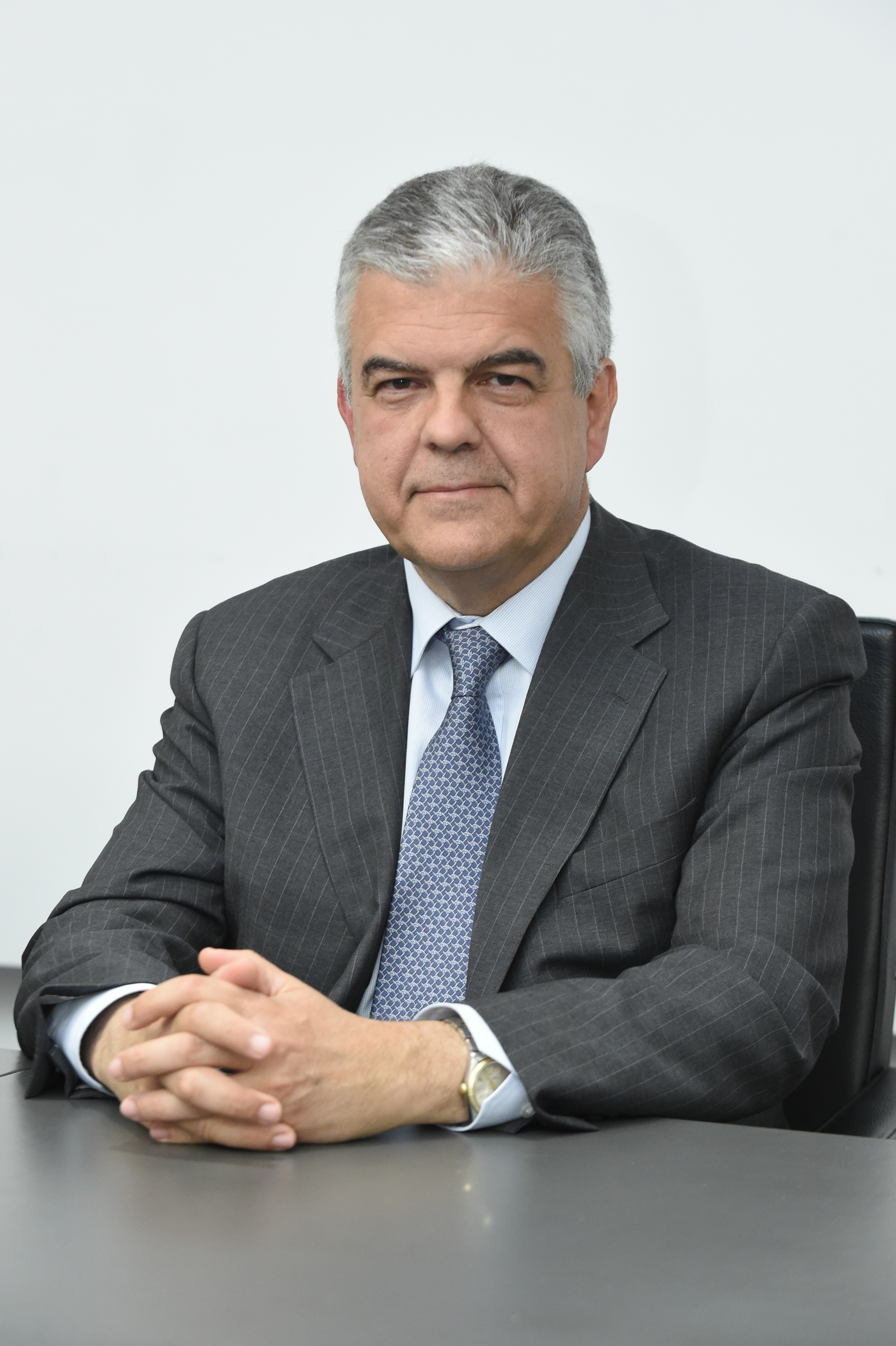
- Luigi Ferraris
- Born: 23 February 1962 (age 63); Legnano, Italy
- Occupation: CEO of Ferrovie dello Stato Italiane (May 2021 – Present)

Luigi Ferraris (born 23 February 1962) is an Italian executive, Chief Executive Officer of Terna S.p.A. from April 2017 to May 2020. Chief Executive Officer of Ferrovie dello Stato Italiane since May 31, 2021, successor to Gianfranco Battisti.

== Biography ==
Ferraris studied Political Economics at the University of Genoa.

He worked as CEO of Enersis from 2014 to 2015, ex - Chairman of Enel Green Power, CFO of Enel Group and Chief Financial Officer of Poste Italiane Group. Luigi Ferraris was also Chairman of Enel Green Power S.p.A. as well as Operating Chairman of Enel Factor S.p.A. In 2015 Luigi Ferraris was appointed Chief Financial Officer of Poste Italiane Group, in charge of managing its privatization process, one of the largest ever undertaken in Italy. He has had also the responsibility of implementing the Group's Risk and Management Control functions, while starting a valorisation and optimization plan for Group's Real Estate properties. Luigi Ferraris worked also as non executive Board Member of Banca del Mezzogiorno – Mediocredito Centrale, PSC S.p.A. Group. He was Board Member of Erg S.p.A. a company listed in the Italian stock exchange. He had a teaching role or “Corporate Strategy” at LUISS University.
