= Terna Group =

Transmission system operator (TSO) based in Rome, Italy

Terna S.p.A.
- Type: Società per azioni
- Traded as: BIT: TRN; FTSE MIB
- Industry: Utilities
- Founded: 1999
- Headquarters: Rome, Italy,
- Key people: Stefano Cuzzilla (Chairman); Pasqualino Monti (CEO and General Manager)
- Services: Transmission system operator
- Revenue: € 4,033.0 million (2025)
- Operating income: € 1,789.9 million (2025)
- Net income: € 1,113.5 million (2025)
- Total assets: € 29,982.8 million (2025)
- Total equity: € 7,791.3 million (2025)
- Number of employees: 7,117 (2025)
- Website: www.terna.it

Terna S.p.A. is a transmission system operator (TSO) based in Rome, Italy. It operates through Terna Rete Italia, that manages the Italian transmission grid and Terna Plus which is in charge of new business opportunities and non-traditional activities in Peru and USA (2025). With 75,905 kilometres (47,165 mi) of power lines or around 98% of the Italian high-voltage power transmission grid, Terna is the leading independent grid operator in Europe and the sixth largest electricity transmission grid operator in the world based on the size of its electrical grid. Terna is listed on the Borsa Italiana and is a constituent of the FTSE MIB index.

== History ==
On 31 May 1999, Terna was established within the Enel Group, by way of implementation of Italian Legislative Decree No. 79/99 which within the context of the process for the deregulation of the Italian electricity sector, sanctioned the separation between ownership and management of the national transmission grid.

On 23 June 2004, following the Prime Minister's Decree issued on 11 May of the same year, Terna was put on sale with an IPO on Borsa Italiana.

In November 2005, Terna acquired a business unit from GRTN, as defined by the Prime Ministerial Decree of 11 May 2004. Cassa Depositi e Prestiti became the relative majority shareholder.

In 2010 Terna joined Desertec, a project aimed at producing and transmitting renewable energy in the Middle East and North Africa (MENA) to meet local needs and be assigned in part to the European interconnected grid.

In 2011, the Terna Group reorganized its corporate structure, establishing a holding company overseeing two fully owned operational subsidiaries: Terna Rete Italia and Terna Plus, each with its own CEO and board of directors.

In 2013, Terna initiated strategic projects, including the “Capri-Torre Annunziata” submarine cable connecting Capri to mainland Italy. The same year, Terna and its French counterpart RTE began work on enhancing the Italy-France interconnection via the new “Piedmont-Savoy” line, which became operational in 2023.

In 2015, Terna acquired the high-voltage grid of the FS Italiane Group and started developing new national and international interconnection infrastructures, including SA.CO.I.3 (Italy-Corsica-Sardinia) and links with Montenegro (inaugurated in 2019) and Austria (operational in 2023).

To support efficiency improvements and environmental protection investments in its national infrastructure, Terna issued its first Green bond worth €750 million in July 2018, becoming the first Italian utility to do so. Additional green hybrid bonds followed in 2022 (€1 billion) and 2024 (€850 million).

In 2022, Terna launched the Tyrrhenian Link interconnection project between Campania and Sicily, followed in 2023 by the Adriatic Link project between Marche and Abruzzo. That year, Terna also activated the submarine connection between Elba Island and Piombino. Internationally, the company developed the world's longest direct-current cable laid along a highway between Italy and France and initiated the first submarine direct-current connection between Europe and North Africa, linking Italy and Tunisia.

In April 2023, Giuseppina Di Foggia was appointed CEO and General Manager, becoming the first woman to lead a major publicly listed Italian company. The same year, Terna launched its 2023-2032 Development Plan, featuring over 30 infrastructure projects, including the Hypergrid project, utilizing high-voltage direct current (HVDC) technologies to double exchange capacity and achieve Italy’s energy transition and security objectives. The Plan was updated in 2025.

On 6 November 2024, Terna signed a binding agreement with Areti, a company controlled by Acea, for the acquisition of part of the high-voltage power grid in the metropolitan area of Rome, marking a step in the process of streamlining and unifying the management of the national transmission grid.

In March 2025, Terna Energy Solutions, the Group company managing non-regulated activities, was reorganized by integrating expertise previously managed by other subsidiaries. Specifically, Altenia was established, bringing together all system integrator activities that had previously been managed separately by LT, Terna Energy Solutions, and Avvenia.

Also in 2025, the Terna Foundation, established in July 2024, was officially presented to the public to promote greater inclusion and broad access to the world of energy through projects and initiatives focused on three main areas of intervention: the dissemination of an energy culture, promoting literacy also through educational initiatives involving younger generations; combating energy poverty; and programs that foster access to the labor market and new professional opportunities in the energy sector.

== Activities ==
=== Italian Transmission Grid ===
As a Transmission System Operator, Terna is responsible for the transmission, management, and dispatching of electricity across the Italian high- and extra-high-voltage grid. It ensures a constant balance between energy demand and supply while promoting the country’s energy and digital transition through the progressive decarbonization of the electricity system and increased integration of renewable energy sources.

Terna plans, designs, and builds interconnection infrastructures within Italy and abroad to ensure the country’s energy security. It also maintains existing infrastructures and works to minimize their impact on biodiversity and landscapes. Operating as a natural monopoly, Terna is regulated by the Italian Authority for Energy, Networks, and the Environment (ARERA).

=== Energy Market Activities in Italy ===
Terna also engages in unregulated activities supporting the energy transition, primarily through Terna Energy Solutions and its subsidiaries.

It provides services to companies in the energy and connectivity market with solutions in photovoltaic systems, energy efficiency, smart grids, housing and hosting, fiber optics, and the production of transformers and underground cables.

== Operations ==
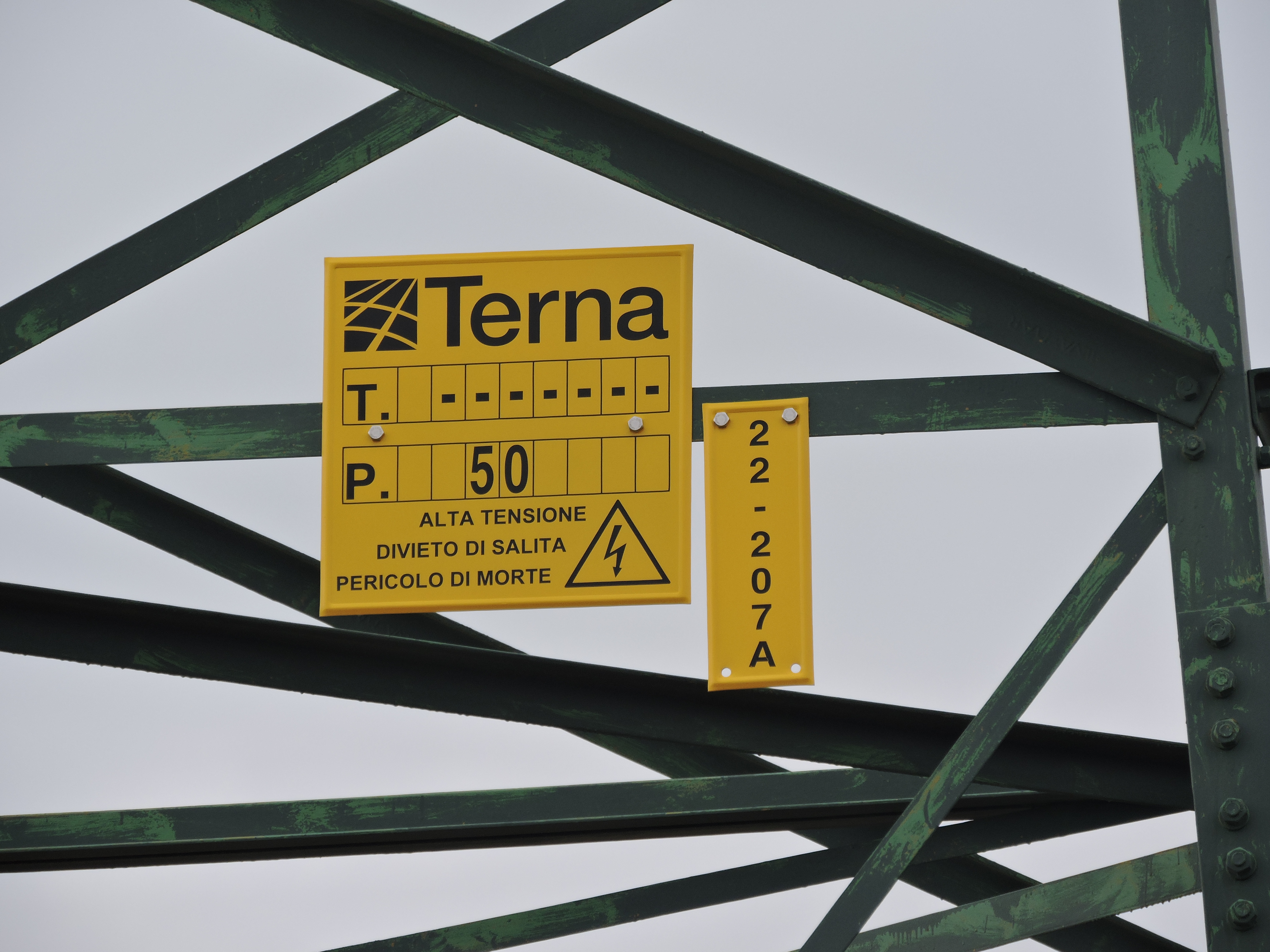
Information panel on a Terna high voltage line

Terna's assets include:

- 75,905 km of lines
- 926 transformation and switching stations
- 1 National Control Center (NCC)
- 4 Control centers
- 30 lines of interconnections with other countries (CTI)
- SA.PE.I. with Sardinia island, one of the longest underwater cables in the world (435 km), with a capacity of 1000 MW

To safeguard its assets, Terna has created an organization capable of protecting the company's physical and technological infrastructures, also through the prevention and management of episodes of corporate fraud. In this framework, in order to guarantee the maximum safeguarding of said infrastructures and investments, it has signed memoranda of understanding, first of its kind and type with the Ministry of the Interior, Carabinieri and Guardia di Finanza.

== Group Structure ==
The Terna Group includes:

- Directly controlled italian companies
  - Terna Rete Italia S.p.A. (100% ownership)
  - Rete S.r.l. (100% ownership)
  - Rete2 S.r.l. (100% ownership)
  - Terna Plus S.r.l. (100% ownership)
  - Terna Energy Solutions S.r.l. (100% ownership)
  - Terna Forward S.r.l. (100% ownership)
  - Terna Interconnector S.r.l. (65% ownership)
  - ESPERIA-CC S.r.l. (1% ownership)
- Directly Controlled Foreign Companies
  - Terna Crna Gora d.o.o. (100% ownership)
- Companies evaluated using the Equity Method and participated by Terna S.p.A.
  - CESI S.p.A. (42.7% ownership)
  - CORESO S.A. (15.8% ownership)
  - CGES (22.1% ownership)
  - Equigy B.V (20% ownership)
  - ELMED ÉTUDES Sarl (50% joint control)
  - SEleNe CC S.A. (33.3% joint control)
  - Hypermeteo S.r.l. (15.4% joint control)
  - Wesii S.r.l. (33% joint control)
- Companies controlled through Terna Energy Solutions S.r.l.
  - Tamini Trasformatori S.r.l. (100% ownership)
  - Brugg Kabel Services AG (92.6% ownership)
  - Avvenia The Energy Innovator S.r.l. (100% ownership)
  - Altenia (89% ownership)
- Companies controlled through Terna Plus S.r.l.
  - Terna Peru S.A.C. (99.9% ownership)
  - Terna 4 Chacas S.A.C. (99.9% ownership)
  - Terna USA LLC. (100% ownership)

=== Terna Linee Alta Tensione S.r.l. ===
On April 1, 2009, Terna acquired 100% of Enel High Voltage Lines S.r.l. from Enel Distribuzione S.p.A. The company owned 18,583 kilometers of high-voltage electricity grid, purchased for €1,152 million. This acquisition brought Terna's ownership to 98.5% of the national grid. Since 2009, Terna has managed these assets using the same approach previously adopted by Enel, outsourcing grid management to third-party companies through national tenders. These companies include Consorzio Arcobaleno, Consorzio Golden Lucano, and Siel.

== Financial results ==
Year	Revenue (€ million)	EBITDA (€ million)	Net Profit (€ million)	Dividend (€ cents)
2025	4,033.0	2,750.8	1,111.5	3.62
2024	3,680.2	2,566.4	1,061.9	39.62
2023	3,186.7	2,168.6	885.4	33.96
2022	2,964.5	2,059.2	857.0	31.44
2021	2,604.8	1,854.8	789.4	29.11
2020	2,514.0	1,830.0	786.0	26.95
2019	2,295.1	1,741.2	757.3	25.00
2018	2,197.0	1,650.6	706.6	23.00
2017	2,162.8	1,603.9	688.3	22.00
2016	2,103.2	1,544.7	633.1	20.00
2015	2,082.1	1,539.2	595.3	20.00
2014	1,996.4	1,491.5	544.5	20.00
2013	1,896.4	1,488.1	513.6	20.00
2012	1,805.9	1,390.0	463.6	20.00
2011	1,554.0	1,122.0	454.0	21.00
2010	1,589.2	1,174.9	612.0	21.00
2009	1,390.2	1,003.2	771.0	19.00
2008	1,196.0	850.7	335.3	15.80
2007	1,348.2	977.8	434.2	15.10

== Governance ==
=== Management from 1999 ===
Chairmen

- Francesco Tatò (1999-2002)
- Fulvio Conti (2002-2005)
- Luigi Roth (2005-2014)
- Catia Bastioli (2014-2020)
- Valentina Bosetti (2020-2023)
- Igor Di Biasio (2023-2026)
- Stefano Cuzzilla (from 2026)

Chief Executive Officers

- Sergio Mobili (1999-2005)
- Flavio Cattaneo (2005-2014)
- Matteo Del Fante (2014-2017)
- Luigi Ferraris (2017-2020)
- Stefano Antonio Donnarumma (2020-2023)
- Giuseppina Di Foggia (2023-2026)
- Pasqualino Monti (from 2026)

=== Board of directors ===
Board members, appointed on May 12, 2026, for the 2026–2028 term:

- Stefano Cuzzilla - Chairman
- Pasqualino Monti - CEO and General manager
- Leopoldo Maria Attolico, Jean-Michel Aubertin, Elena Biffi, Paolo Damilano, Antonella Faggi, Gian Luca Gregori, Anna Lorusso, Qinjing Shen, Anna Chiara Svelto, Silvia Tossini, Elisabetta Tromellini

=== Shareholders ===
Terna has been listed in the Italian Stock Exchange since 2004. The main shareholders are:

- CDP Reti – 29.9%
- Retail – 13.3%
- Institutional investors – 56.6%
- Own shares – 0.2%

== Honours ==
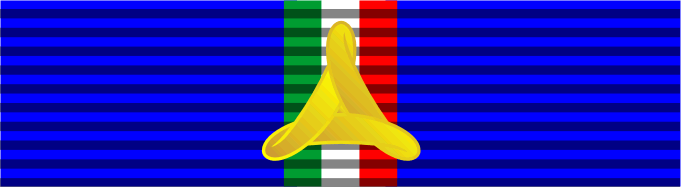
Certificate and Golden Bronze Medal of Excellence, First Class, for Public Merit

"For participation in the seismic event of April 6, 2009, in Abruzzo, due to the extraordinary contribution made with the deployment of human and instrumental resources to overcome the emergency." — Rome, Decree of the President of the Council of Ministers, October 11, 2010

=== Awards ===
- 2010 and 2013: Terna received the International Utility Award from the Edison Electric Institute as the best-performing European utility for total shareholder return over the past three years.
- 2019: Terna ranked first in the Electric Utilities sector of the Dow Jones Sustainability Index for the second consecutive year.
- 2023: Terna won the Best ESG Rating Award from Standard Ethics for its commitment to biodiversity protection.
- June 2023: The Edison Electric Institute awarded Terna the International Edison Award for its innovative Italy-France electrical interconnection project, which is entirely invisible and environmentally impact-free.
- In 2025, Terna obtained the Top Employers Italy 2025 Certification awarded by the Top Employers Institute, a global human resources certification body.
