= Salcca-Pucara hydroelectric project =

Salcca-Pucara hydroelectric project is a hydropower project in Peru. The project envisages transferring water from the Río Salcca into the Vilcanota River and an electrical power output of 130 megawatt. The net worth of the project planned is $300,000,000. The start of construction work was planned to occur in September 2015.

Concerns have been raised that electricity from the plant will primarily benefit mining companies and will result in soil contamination and damage to agriculture, as river flows will be altered. There has been opposition, including strikes in 2007 and protests in the two following years which resulted in a temporary suspension of the project. Nevertheless, after negotiations in December 2012 the last community whose permission was outstanding approved the project of the Cuzco-based company Ege Cuzco. Opposition nevertheless continued, with a 2014 report of the ombudsman of Peru indicating the possibility of social conflict.
