= Enel Generación Perú =

Peruvian electric company

Enel Generación Perú S.A.A.
- Type: Public
- Traded as: BVL: EDEGELC1
- Industry: Utility
- Founded: (1906)
- Headquarters: Lima, Peru
- Key people: Carlos Temboury Molina (chairman)
- Products: Electricity generation
- Number of employees: 242
- Parent: Enel
- Website: www.enel.pe

Enel Generación Perú S.A.A., formerly Edegel, was the largest private electric power generation company in Peru. The company had a total installed capacity of more than 1.400 megawatts (MW), and it supplied the Peruvian national grid.

The company was owned by Enel until 2023, when it sold its assets to China Southern Power Grid.
