= Giuseppe Soda =

- Born: 2 April 1967 (age 59); Gorgonzola, Italy
- Education: Bocconi University
- Occupation: Professor

Giuseppe Soda (born 2 April 1967, in Gorgonzola) is Full Professor of Organization Theory & Social Network Analysis at Università Bocconi and at SDA Bocconi School of Management where he served as Dean from 2016 to 2022.

== Career ==
Soda is Professor of Organization Theory and Design, and Network Analysis at Bocconi University, Milan. The Board of Trustees of Bocconi University appointed Soda as Dean of SDA Bocconi School of Management in 2016, role fulfilled until the year 2022. Prior to the appointment as Dean, Soda was elected in 2013 as the Director of the Management & Technology Department at Bocconi University, and appointed as the Head of Research Division at SDA Bocconi School of Management for the period 2006-2013.

Soda's research has investigated the performance consequences of the dynamic interplay between organizational architectures and organizational networks. His contribution on the origins and evolution of organizational networks is considered seminal. His works has been published in Administrative Science Quarterly, Strategic Management Journal, Organization Science, Academy of Management Journal, Strategic Organization, Academy of Management Annals, Journal of Management and Organization Studies.
