= Enel =

Multinational energy company based in Italy

Enel S.p.A.
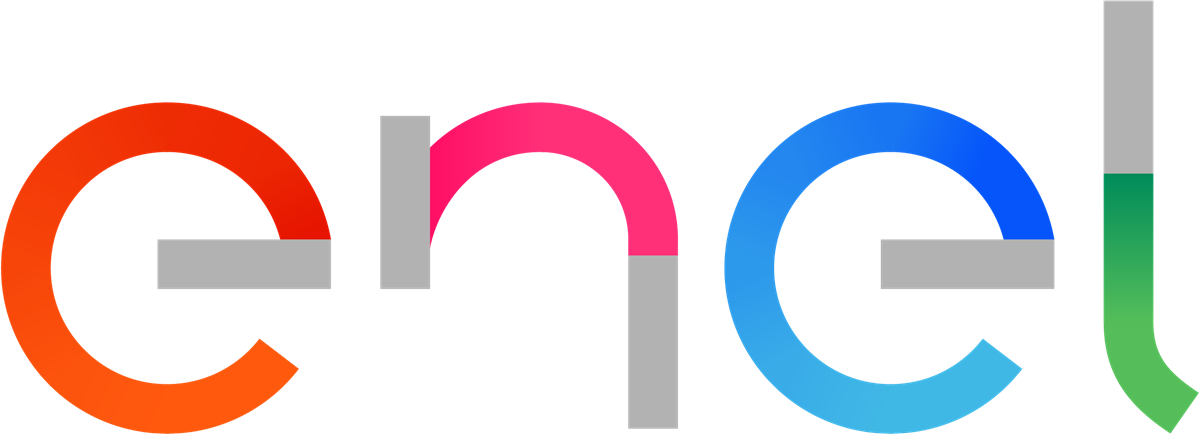

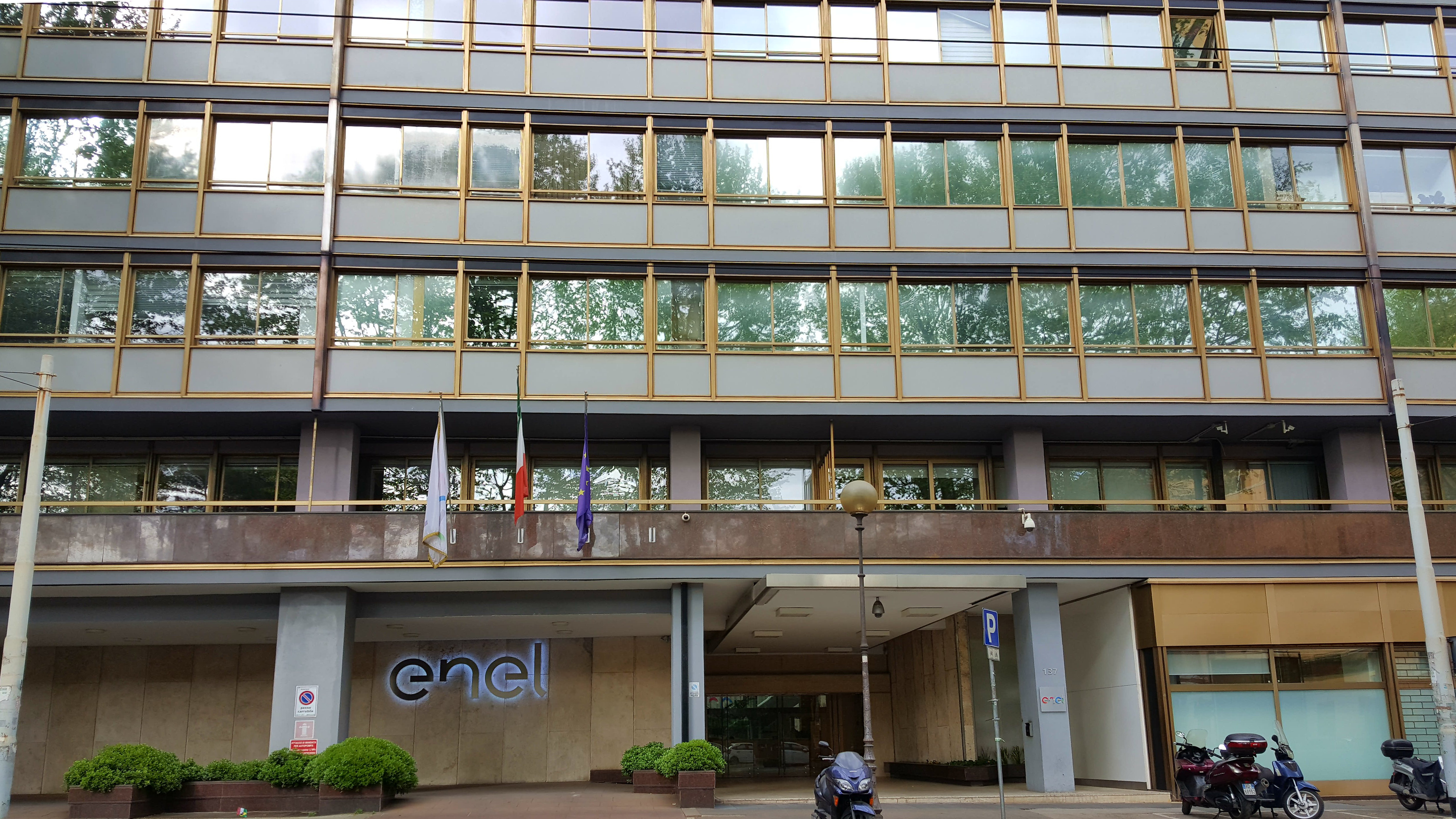
- Company seat in Rome
- Type: Società per azioni
- Traded as: BIT: ENEL; FTSE MIB Component
- Industry: Electric utility
- Founded: 27 November 1962; 63 years ago
- Founder: Italian government
- Headquarters: Rome, Italy
- Area served: Worldwide
- Key people: Paolo Scaroni (Chairman); Flavio Cattaneo (CEO)
- Products: Electricity generation and distribution; natural gas distribution
- Revenue: ▲€80.947 billion (2025)
- Operating income: ▼€11.533 billion (2025)
- Net income: ▼€4.225 billion (2025)
- Total assets: ▼€178.657 billion (2025)
- Total equity: ▼€46.805 billion (2025)
- Owner: Ministero dell’Economia e delle Finanze (23.6%)
- Number of employees: 61,634 (2025)
- Website: www.enel.com

Enel S.p.A. is an Italian multinational producer and distributor of electricity and gas. Enel was established as a public body at the end of 1962 and was transformed into a limited company in 1992. In 1999, following the liberalisation of the electricity market in Italy, Enel was privatised. The Italian state, through the Ministry of Economy and Finance, is the company's largest shareholder, holding 23.6% of its share capital as of 31 December 2024.

The company is listed on the FTSE MIB index of the Borsa Italiana. Enel is the world's second-largest power company by revenue, after the State Grid Corporation of China.

== History ==
=== 1898–1962: Towards a national policy for electricity ===
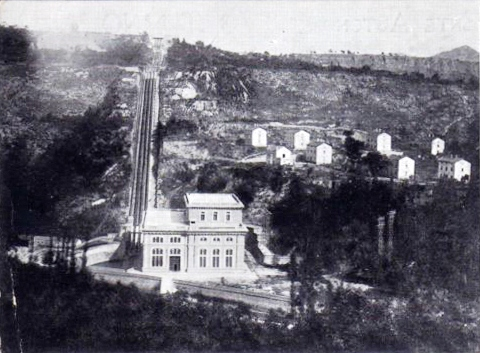
The hydroelectric power station of Rocchetta a Volturno

In 1898, the production of electricity in Italy was 100 GWh, and had a value of over $56 billion by 1960. The majority of the electricity was produced by regional private companies, or by companies linked to other industrial bodies, both local and regional, by exploiting the specific characteristics of the territory: its hydrogeological resources.

The state subsidised the construction of power stations and other necessary construction work in the territory in order to increase the production of electricity. In 1961, the state-regulated distribution, with unified national tariffs set on the basis of equal consumption classes (through the Equalisation Fund for the Electricity Sector), and by requiring power companies to provide access to electricity for everyone.

In 1962, the government institutionalised the Entity for electricity with the aim of making electricity a means for the development of the country and in order to define a national policy for electricity based on the experiences of other countries such as France and the United Kingdom.

=== 1962: Establishment of the National Electricity Board ===
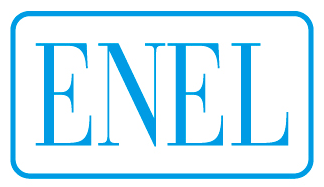
Enel logo (1963–1982)

At the beginning of 1962, the Fanfani IV Cabinet committed the government to put together a proposal for the unification of the national electricity system within three months of the parliament passing a confidence motion.

During the Chamber of Deputies assembly of 26 June 1962, the government presented a bill that sanctioned the principles and procedures for the establishment of the Ente Nazionale per l'energia Elettrica (E.N.EL).

According to the bill, Enel was going to acquire all assets of companies producing, processing, transmitting, and distributing electricity, with the exception of self-producers—companies that produced more than 70% of their electricity for other production processes—(the same exception was later applied to municipal authorities), and of small businesses that did not produce more than 10 million kilowatt hours per year.

Procedures to assess the value of the acquired companies were defined, and it was established that compensation was to be paid to creditors in 10 years at an interest rate of 5.5%. Within this framework, 1962 was to be considered a transition year, in which all income and expenses of the acquired companies would be transferred to Enel. 1963 was thus the first operational year of the newly formed company.

The first companies to be acquired were: SIP (Piedmont), Edison Volta (Lombardy), SADE (Veneto), SELT-Valdarno (Tuscany), SRE (Lazio), SME (Campania), SGES (Sicily), and Carbosarda (Sardinia).

=== 1963–1970: Modernization and development of the network ===
Enel's early goals were the modernization and development of the electricity grid with the construction of a high voltage power lines backbone, international connections, connections to the islands, rural electrification, and the creation of a national centre for dispatching. These projects were to be co-financed by the state through the issuing, in 1965, of bonds valued at over 200 billion Italian liras. In 1967, Enel, which was originally supervised by the Committee of Ministers, began to be overseen by the inter-ministerial Committee for Economic Planning (CIPE), under the Ministry of Industry. During this period, production from thermal power stations surpassed, for the very first time, that of hydroelectric power.

In 1963, the National Dispatch Centre of Rome was created to manage the energy network by coordinating the production plants, the transmission network, the distribution, as well as the interconnection of the Italian electricity system with that of foreign countries by adjusting in real time the production and transmission of energy on the basis of actual demand.

In terms of rural electrification, the settlements that were not connected to the electricity grid declined from 1.27% in 1960 to 0.46% in 1964, with over 320,000 new residents being connected. In the five-year period between 1966 and 1970, further investments for rural electrification were made, where 80% of the costs were covered by the state and 20% by Enel, part of those costs being incurred by reducing some rates as an incentive for agricultural development.

In 1968, the construction of the 380 kV high-voltage connection between Florence and Rome began, with the aim of joining the high voltage electrical system of the north with that of the centre and the south. Around the same time, international high voltage connections with France (380 kV Venaus-Villarodin, 1969) and Switzerland were also put in place. In the same year, undersea electrical cables were put in place to connect the peninsula and the islands of Elba (1966), Ischia (1967), and Sardinia through Corsica (1967).

In 1963, Enel was involved in the Vajont Dam disaster. On 9 October 1963, a huge landslide of 260 million cubic metres fell into the reservoir formed by the dam. The dam and power plant had been built by the Società Adriatica di Elettricità (the Adriatic Electricity Company, or SADE) and then sold to Edison, and it had just been transferred as part of the nationalisation process to the newly established Enel. The landslide created huge waves in the Vajont reservoir, which partially flooded the villages of Erto e Casso and swept over the dam, completely wiping out the towns in the valley below it: Longarone, Pirago, Rivalta, Villanova, and Faè.

Approximately two thousand people died in the disaster. Enel and Montedison were charged in the ensuing trial as the companies responsible for the disaster, a responsibility considered all more serious because of the predictability of the event. The two companies were forced to pay damages to the communities involved in the catastrophe.

=== 1970–1989: Energy crisis and search for new sources ===
The decade of the 1970s was distinguished by a major energy crisis that led the company to implement drastic austerity measures, and the establishment of a national energy plan that defined the objectives of both building new power plants and searching for new energy sources.

In 1975, as a result of the 1973 oil crisis and the austerity measures, and following the establishment of the first National Energy Plan (PEN), the aim of the company became that of reducing Enel's dependence on hydrocarbons, which was to be achieved with the use of other energy sources, including hydro, geothermal, coal, reducing waste, and, in particular, the use of nuclear power.

Several new plants were built in the course of the decade. In the early 1970s, the construction of the nuclear power station of Caorso (Emilia-Romagna), the first major nuclear power plant in Italy (to generate 840-860 MW), began. The station became operational in 1978. Between 1972 and 1978, the hydroelectric plant of Taloro was built in the province of Nuoro (Sardinia). In 1973, the hydroelectric plant of San Fiorano became operational. In 1977, a thermoelectric power plant opened in Torre del Sale, near Piombino (Tuscany). At the end of the 1970s, the construction of the thermal power plant of Porto Tolle (Veneto) began, and its first completed section became active in 1980.

Between 1971 and 1977, the pilot 1000 kV transmission facilities in Suvereto (Tuscany) were tested. In 1974, the construction of the Adriatic high voltage electric backbone was completed. Between 1973 and 1977, wells for geothermal energy production were drilled in Torre Alfina, in the province of Viterbo (Lazio). The dam of Alto Gesso (Piedmont) was completed in 1982 as part of the hydroelectric power station Luigi Einaudi "Entracque".

The 1980s were characterised by the construction of new plants and the testing of alternative forms of energy, the Italian nuclear power phase-out, as well as a gradual reduction of reliance on oil, which decreased from 75.3% in 1973 to 58.5% in 1985. Several large power plants became active during this period. Among these, the fossil fuel power plant of Fiumesanto (Sardinia) in 1983–84; the pumped-storage hydroelectricity power station of Edolo (Lombardy) in 1984–85, one of the biggest of its kind in Europe; and the coal power plant of Torrevaldaliga Nord (Lazio) in 1984.

In 1981, with the help of the European Economic Community, Enel built the first large-scale compact linear Fresnel reflector concentrated solar power plant, the 1 MWe Eurelios power station in Adrano (Sicily). The plant was shut down in 1987. In 1984, the photovoltaic power station of Vulcano (Sicily) became active. In the same year, the first wind farm in the country became operational in Alta Nurra (Sardinia).

During 1985, the national center for the dispatch and control of the electricity network was gradually transferred from the center of Rome to Settebagni, and made a part of a bigger European network for the synchronisation of electricity production.

In 1986, Enel had its first positive balance, with a profit of 14.1 billion Italian liras.

In 1987, in the aftermath of the Chernobyl disaster, the first referendum on nuclear power took place and was won by those opposed to nuclear power. This result marked the end of nuclear power in Italy, the closing and suspension of all construction of nuclear power stations, and the establishment of a new national energy plan. The Caorso Nuclear Power Plant in Emilia-Romagna, which had been inactive since 1986 due to refuelling, was never reactivated and was finally closed in 1990.

The Enrico Fermi Nuclear Power Plant in Piedmont was deactivated in 1987 and shut down in 1990. The construction work on the Montalto di Castro Nuclear Power Station, started in 1982, was interrupted in 1988. The station was converted the following year into a multi-fuel plant. The Latina Nuclear Power Plant was shut down in 1988. The Garigliano Nuclear Power Plant had been shut down since 1978.

In 1988, the new National Energy Plan (PEN) established its key objectives: increased energy efficiency, environmental protection, the exploitation of national resources, the diversification of sources of supply from abroad, and the overall competitiveness of the production system.

=== 1990–present: Liberalisation and privatisation ===
Enel's new logo presented 26 January 2016

Between 1990 and 2000, the Italian electricity market was progressively liberalized. In 1991, Law No. 9/1991 sanctioned a first partial liberalisation of the production of electricity generated from conventional sources and renewable energy sources; companies were allowed to produce electricity for their own use with an obligation to hand over the excess amount to Enel. In July 1992, the Amato I Cabinet turned Enel into a joint-stock company with the Treasury as the sole shareholder.

In 1999, the D'Alema I Cabinet issued Legislative Decree no. 79 of 16 March 1999 (known as the Bersani Decree) to liberalise the electricity sector. This opened up the possibility for other actors to operate in the energy market. Enel—which had so far been the only actor in the production, distribution, and sale of electricity in Italy—had now to change its corporate structure by distinguishing the three phases and constituting itself as three different companies: Enel Produzione, Enel Distribuzione, and Terna, respectively, for energy production, distribution, and transmission. Moreover, Enel could produce only 50% of the national production according to the new law.

That same year, 31.7% of the company, in its new structure, was privatised. Following privatization, Enel was put on the stock market; its shares were listed on the Italian Stock Exchange with a value of €4.3 per share; the total number was 4,183 million shares for a total value of €18 billion.

In this period, Enel was involved in several new projects. In 1993, the company built the Serre photovoltaic plant. At the time, this was largest of its kind in Europe with an installed capacity of 3.3 megawatts. In 1997, Enel, France Télécom, and Deutsche Telekom founded Wind as a joint venture, a mobile and fixed telecom operator. In 2000, Enel launched a project to connect Italy's and Greece's power grids by laying a 160 km underwater power line, capable of carrying 600 megawatts, to connect Otranto (Apulia) with the Greek city of Aetos. The project, completed in 2002, had a total cost of €339 million.

During the 2000s, the company worked to reduce the environmental impact of the production of energy and on a progressive internationalization of Enel through a number of mergers and acquisitions. In 2000, Enel signed an agreement with the Italian Ministry of the Environment and the Ministry of Economic Development in which the company committed to reduce carbon dioxide emissions by 13.5% before 2002, and by 20% before 2006. That year, Enel acquired CHI Energy, a renewable energy producer operating in the US and Canadian markets, for $170 million. In the following years, Enel continued investing in renewable energy and clean technologies. In 2004, the company was included in the Dow Jones Sustainability Index, a stock market index that evaluates the financial performance of companies based on economic, environmental, and social performance.

In 2008, Enel formed Enel Green Power, a company dedicated to developing and managing the production of power from renewable energy. In 2009, Enel launched the Archilede project, a new urban lighting system chosen by 1600 municipalities. This new intelligent lighting technology resulted in approximately 26 GWh per year of energy saving, and reduced carbon dioxide emissions by 18,000 tons per year. That same year, the company opened a new photovoltaic power station in the Park of Villa di Pratolino, in Florence. The project - called "Diamante" – was to build a plant capable of storing, as hydrogen, enough of the solar energy accumulated during the day to meet night-time requirements. In 2010, the Archimede combined cycle power plant became operational at Priolo Gargallo, near Syracuse in Sicily. This was the first thermal solar field to use molten salt–technology integrated with a combined cycle gas facility.

Enel had several acquisitions and divestments in this period. In 2001, the company won the tender offer for the purchase of Viesgo—a subsidiary of Endesa—a company active on the Spanish market in the production and distribution of electricity, with a net installed capacity of 2400 megawatts. In 2002, Enel divested Eurogen SpA, Elettrogen SpA, and Interpower SpA in compliance with the Bersani Decree provisions on the liberalization of electricity production. In 2001, Enel acquired Infostrada, previously a subsidiary of Olivetti, at a cost of 7.25 billion euros. Infostrada was later merged with Wind, with 17 million customers. In 2005, Enel assigned 62.75% ownership of Wind to Weather Investments, a company belonging to the Egyptian businessman Naguib Sawiris, at the time CEO of Orascom Telecom Holding (the remaining 37.25% was divested in 2006).

In 2008 and 2009, Enel Stoccaggi and Enel Rete Gas were sold to investors, mainly Primo Fondo Italiano per le Infrastrutture. In 2011, Enel opened the first pilot carbon dioxide–capture facility in Italy, in the area of Brindisi, in the existing power plant ENEL Federico II. That year, Enel Distribuzione built its first Smart grid in Isernia, a grid capable of effectively adjusting the two-way flow of electricity generated from renewable sources. The total investment for this project was €10 million.

Also in 2011, Enel became part of the United Nations Global Compact, a United Nations initiative to encourage businesses to adopt sustainable policies worldwide, and signed a cooperation framework agreement with the World Food Programme, to fight against world hunger and climate change. The cost of the project was €8 million, which included the production and distribution of high-efficiency cooking stoves, the installation of photovoltaic systems in all WFP logistical premises, and giving support to humanitarian interventions. In the same year, the company was added to the FTSE4Good Index of the London Stock Exchange which measures businesses' behaviour in terms of environmental sustainability, relationships with stakeholders, human rights, the quality of working conditions, and fighting against corruption.

In 2012, Enel sold the remaining 5.1% of Terna in its possession, thus exiting completely from the high-voltage market. In 2013, Enel signed an agreement, in Sochi, for the sale of 40% of Arctic Russia, a joint venture with Eni, which in turn controlled 49% of SeverEnergia, for $1.8 billion. In May 2014, Maria Patrizia Grieco was elected president of the board of directors; and Francesco Starace was appointed CEO. The company's main objectives were set to be the reorganisation of activities in Iberia and Latin America and debt reduction. In 2014, Enel—together with Endesa, Accelerace, and FundingBox—initiated the INCENSe program (Internet Cleantech Enablers Spark), which was co-funded by the European Commission, for the promotion of technological innovation in renewable energy, and was joined by over 250 start-ups from 30 countries in 2015. In 2014 and 2015, Enel was included in the STOXX Global ESG Governance Leaders index, an index that measures a company's environmental, social, and governance practices.

Enel took part in Expo 2015 in Milan as an Official Global Partner. With a €29 million investment, as well as building its own pavilion, Enel built a Smart City over the entire Expo area, simulating a city of 100,000 inhabitants with a total energy consumption of 1 GWh per day. The Smart City comprised a smart grid for the distribution of electricity, an operations center for the monitoring and management of the smart grid, an information system that allowed visitors to view in real-time the electricity consumption in each pavilion, charging stations for electric vehicles, and LED lighting of the entire exhibition site.

During 2016–2018, Enel carried out a series of operations aimed at digitising and innovating the Group, with particular attention to sustainability. In January 2016, Enel launched the "Open Power" brand, which presented the company with a new visual identity and a new logo. The concept of "openness" became the driver of the Group’s operative and communicative strategy. In June 2016, Enel presented the Enel Open Meter, the 2.0 smart meter designed to replace first-generation electronic meters. Open Meter was designed by Italian designer and architect Michele De Lucchi. In July 2016, Enel launched an Innovation Hub in Tel Aviv to scout 20 start-ups and foster collaboration, while offering a personalized support programme. In December 2016, Open Fiber completed the acquisition of Metroweb Italia for €714 million.

In 2016, a hydrogen-fueled power station located in Fusina, near Venice was commissioned but only produced energy for less than two years with costs of energy production 5-6 times higher than conventional sources.

In March 2017, Enel inaugurated the Innovation Hub at University of California, Berkeley, an initiative for start-up scouting and collaboration development. In April 2017, in joint venture with Dutch Infrastructure Fund, the company launched the largest "ready-to-build" solar PV project in Australia. In May 2017, Enel launched E-solutions, a new global business line to explore new technologies, as well as to develop products. In July 2017, Enel joined Formula E for the first zero-emission event in the championship’s history in New York. In September 2017, Enel ranked 20th in Fortune’s 2017 "Change the World" list and became one of the top 50 companies in the world – and the only Italian company – to have a positive social impact through business activities. In the same month, Enel and ENAP inaugurated Cerro Pabellón, the first geothermal power plant in South America and the first in the world to be built at 4,500 meters above sea level.

In October 2017, the company inaugurated an Innovation Hub in Russia in collaboration with the technological hub of Skolkovo. In the same month, Enel was included in the Top 20 of Forbes World’s Best Employers List 2017 and was confirmed by the non-profit global platform CDP as a global leader in the fight against climate change. In November 2017, Enel presented E-Mobility Revolution, a plan which seeks to install 7000 recharging stations for electric vehicles by 2020. In November 2017, Enel presented the 2018-2020 strategic plan, which was characterised by a focus on digitization and new offers to customers. In December 2017, Enel and Audi signed an agreement to develop electric mobility services. In the same month, the Group launched the Enel X brand.

In January 2018, Enel launched a new green bond in Europe. The issue amounted to a total of €1250 million. In January 2018, Enel was confirmed for the tenth time in the ECPI Sustainability Index series. In February 2018, it received the 2018 Ethical Boardroom Corporate Governance award for sustainability and corporate governance standards. In February 2018, Enel became title sponsor of the FIM MotoE World Cup, as well as Sustainable Power Partner of the MotoGP. In March 2018, it invested $170 million in the construction of Peru’s largest solar PV plant. In May 2018, Enel became a partner of the Osmose project for the development of integrated systems and services in the renewable energy industry. In the same month, the company inaugurated Global Thermal Generation Innovation Hub&Lab in Pisa, a space for the development of innovative technologies of interest to thermal generation. In May 2018, Enel won the final round of the tender offer for the acquisition of Eletropaulo.

At the end of March 2019, Enel became the most valuable company on the Italian Stock Exchange, with a capitalisation of over €67 billion. On 23 September, the company was included in the STOXX Europe 50 index. That same year, Enel's CEO Francesco Starace was awarded the "Manager Utility Energia 2019" prize by the Management delle Utilities e delle Infrastrutture (MUI) Italian magazine.

In April 2022, Enel X Way was launched. It is the new business line of the Group and aims to accelerate the development of electric mobility and combine decarbonization, digitalization and electrification. The initiative was presented by CEO Elisabetta Ripa at Rome's Formula E Grand Prix.

On 22 May 2023, Enel subsidiary Enel North America announced the Tulsa Port of Inola as the future site of one of the largest solar cell and panel manufacturing plants in the U.S. Enel expects to invest over $1 billion in the facility, creating 1,000 permanent jobs with the possibility of creating another 900 in a second phase. Oklahoma officials have called this the biggest economic development project in the state.

Enel is also active through 3Sun at the Catania Gigafactory, for which it signed a grant agreement with the European Commission in April 2022 under the first call of the EU Innovation Fund for large-scale projects. The project supports the development of TANGO (iTaliAN pv Giga factOry), which involves the construction of an industrial-scale plant for the production of advanced, sustainable, high-efficiency photovoltaic modules at the Catania Gigafactory. The expansion will increase production capacity from 200 MW to 3 GW per year, a fifteenfold growth.

In June 2022, Enel completed its exit from the Russian market by signing two agreements for the sale of its stake in PJSC Enel Russia. Specifically, one sale contract was signed with PJSC Lukoil and another with the Closed Combined Mutual Investment Fund "Gazprombank-Frezia". The divested stake, representing 56.43% of Enel Russia’s share capital, was sold for approximately €137 million. Through this transaction, Enel fully disposed of its electricity generation assets in Russia, including around 5.6 GW of conventional capacity and approximately 300 MW of wind power facilities at various stages of development.

On 10 May 2023, Enel’s shareholders’ meeting approved the appointment of Paolo Scaroni as Chairman of the Board of Directors.

On 12 May 2023, the newly appointed Board of Directors, chaired by Paolo Scaroni, held its first meeting. During the session, the Board appointed Flavio Cattaneo as CEO and General Manager.

On 25 October 2023, through Enel Green Power, Enel finalized the sale of its assets in Romania to the Greek company Public Power Corporation S.A. The transaction was completed in accordance with the sale agreement signed on 9 March 2023.

In May 2024, Enel announced the completion of the sale of its stakes in the power generation companies Enel Generación Perú and Compañía Energética Veracruz to Niagara Energy. The transaction was carried out through Enel Perú, which is controlled by Enel via the publicly listed Chilean company Enel Américas. The following month, Enel also finalized the sale of its entire shareholding in Enel Distribución Perú and Enel X Perú. This transaction was concluded with North Lima Power Grid Holding, a company controlled by China Southern Power Grid International (HK) Co.

In September 2023, Enel transferred 50% of its stake in Enel Green Power Australia to INPEX, establishing a joint ownership for the company.

In December 2023, Enel, through Enel Green Power, completed the sale of 50% of its subsidiary Enel Green Power Hellas to Macquarie Asset Management. The deal led to the formation of a joint venture between the two parties to jointly manage Enel Green Power Hellas’s existing renewable generation portfolio and continue its development pipeline.

In December 2024, Potentia Energy was established as a co-managed venture between Enel Green Power and INPEX, aimed at advancing renewable energy projects. The development pipeline includes more than 7 GW of planned capacity in wind, solar, energy storage, and hybrid systems.

In October 2025, Lene was established as a digital company within the Enel Group, active in the retail energy market. The company is designed to offer electricity and gas contracts in a digital, intuitive, and simplified manner.

== Controversies ==
=== Osage Wind LLC ===
Osage Wind dug foundations for wind turbines, crushed the rock and returned the dust to the earth.

On 11 November 2014, the United States Attorney for the Northern District of Oklahoma filed suit against Enel's subsidiary Osage Wind LLC, an 84-turbine industrial wind project in Osage County, Okla. In the suit, the United States alleges that Enel and Osage Wind are illegally converting minerals owned by the Osage Nation, a Native American tribe that has owned all mineral rights in the county since 1871. The suit says that Osage Wind should have obtained a permit from the Bureau of Indian Affairs before mining rock and other material for the pits in which turbine bases are built. The United States asked that all excavating on the 8,500-acre site cease and that dozens of turbines that are already being erected be removed. Osage Wind has insisted that it is not mining and needs no permit. The company says that it has already spent nearly $300 million on the project, which is being built on privately owned fee land, not land held in trust for American Indians.

Osage Wind LLC and a second and adjacent Enel wind project, Mustang Run, are also embroiled in cases pending before the Oklahoma Supreme Court in which the Osage Nation and Osage County, Oklahoma, are challenging the constitutional legitimacy of permits for both projects.

In December 2024, United States Court of International Trade Judge Jennifer Choe-Groves ruled the defendants "liable for conversion, trespass and continuing trespass of the Osage Mineral Estate" and ordered Enel to remove all of the turbines by December 2025. Choe-Groves ruled Enel had "committed trespass by extracting minerals from the Osage illegally," and ordered Enel in addition to pay $300,000 in damages and millions in legal fees. Enel immediately appealed the ruling.

=== El Salvador ===
Enel had to exit the El Salvador electricity market after a long dispute with the Government of El Salvador. Article 109 of the Constitution of El Salvador states that underground natural resources are the country's property and the government should not allow a foreign company to be the sole proprietor of geothermal generation. Both parties came to a settlement in 2014, but no details have been released.

=== Slovakia ===
Enel had been demanding over €94 million from the Ministry of Economy of Slovakia in compensation for lost earnings it claims to have incurred as price proposals were rejected by the Slovakian Regulatory Office for Network Industries (URSO).

=== Meeting with Vladimir Putin immediately prior to 2022 Russian invasion of Ukraine ===
In early 2022, Enel and acting CEO Francesco Starace came under criticism for meeting in person with acting President of Russia Vladimir Putin to discuss massive Russian investments and sanction exemptions, just over a week prior to the 2022 Russian invasion of Ukraine.

== Production and service capacities ==
Enel produces electricity from a number of energy sources including geothermal, wind power, solar power, hydroelectric power, thermal, and nuclear power. In 2025, Enel generated a total of 200 TWh of electricity, distributed 474.7 TWh, and sold 249.9 TWh.

Enel is also engaged in research and development activities for the production and transmission of electricity. These include:

- the design and implementation of "hybrid plants" that combine the use of different sources and technologies for energy storage, in order to increase the efficiency of plants.
- the development of smart grids that increase efficiency and sustainability in the distribution of electricity, with the support of the European Community.

== Corporate organisation ==
Enel is headquartered in Rome and has been listed on the Borsa Italiana since 1999. Enel and its subsidiaries produce and distribute electricity and gas in 27 countries around Europe, North America, South America, Asia, and Africa.

The company employs more than 61,000 people, has more than 54 million customers worldwide (48.3 million in the electricity market, and 5.7 million in the gas market) and a net installed generating capacity of 88 GW. Enel is the largest energy company in Europe by number of customers and the second by capacity, after EdF.

The Enel Group is organised in 4 business lines:

- Enel Green Power and Thermal Generation: electricity generation.
- Enel Grids: transport infrastructure and energy distribution.
- Global Energy and Commodity Management: provides Enel Group companies, as well as third parties, both with goods to be used in power plants and with optimisation services for energy production and distribution.
- Enel Commercial: provides value-added services.

== Subsidiaries ==
For trading on international markets, as well as for the procurement and sale of energy products including gas, Enel owns 100% of Enel Trade, which in turn owns 100% of Enel Trade Romania, Enel Trade Croatia, and Enel Trade Serbia.

Through Enel Trade, Enel also owns Nuove Energie, a company that specialises in the construction of regasification plants.

In Italy, Enel owns companies that produce, distribute and resell electricity:

- 100% of Enel Energia – which deals with the sale of electricity and natural gas on the free market and to end customers. Enel Energia also owns 100% of Enel.si, a company that offers renewable energy to end customers and franchises "Punto Enel Green Power".
- 100% of e-distribuzione – for the distribution of electricity.
- 100% of Enel Sole – which deals with public and artistic lighting.

In France, Enel owns 5% of the French energy exchange Powernext.

In Spain, through its subsidiary Enel Iberia Srl (previously known as Enel Energy Europe), Enel holds 70.1% of Endesa, acquired in 2009 with an initial stake of 92%. The acquisition earned Enel the 2009 Platts Global Energy Award for "Deal of the Year". In 2016, Endesa acquired Enel Green Power España from Enel for €1.207 billion.

Enel operated in Russia from 2004 , until fully exiting the market in June 2022, when it disposed of its electricity generation assets in the country. It owned 56.4% of Enel Russia (formerly OGK-5) and 49.5% of the electricity supplier RusEnergoSbyt, through Enel Investment Holding BV. In 2013, Rosneft, through NGK Itera, bought 40% of Enel's stake in Arctic Russia BV, a company which owned 19.6% of SeverEnergia. In March 2022, Enel announced it would cease operations in Russia, completing its exit process in June of the same year, when it signed two agreements for the sale of its 56.43% stake in PJSC Enel Russia to PJSC Lukoil and “Gazprombank-Frezia”.

In Argentina, Enel holds a 41% share of Empresa Distribuidora Sur SA.

In Chile, Enel controls 61.99% of Empresa Electrica Panguipulli SA, 56.80% of Enel Américas SA, 61.4% of Distribución Chile SA, 57.9% of Generación Chile SA, 61.9% of Enel Green Power Chile Ltd, 61.9% of Enel Green Power del Sur SpA, and 58.0% of Gas Atacama Chile SA. In October 2023, it was announced Enel Chile had sold 416 MW of solar PV portfolio in Chile, to the multinational renewable energy producer, Sonnedix.

In Peru, through Enel Perù SAC, Enel controls 47.2% of Enel Distribución Perù SAA and 47.5% of Enel Generación Perú SA.

On 7 April 2023, Enel announced that its subsidiary Enel Perú S.A.C. – controlled through the Chilean publicly traded company Enel Américas S.A. – entered into an agreement with China Southern Power Grid International (HK) Co., Ltd. for the sale of its equity interests in Enel Distribución Perú S.A.A. and in Enel X Perú S.A.C., for an aggregate amount of around 2.9 billion US dollars.

On 22 November 2023, Enel also announced that its subsidiaries Enel Américas S.A. and Enel Perú S.A.C. – the latter under the control of Enel via the Chilean listed company Enel Américas – have finalized an agreement with Niagara Energy S.A.C. for the sale of all the shares held by Enel in Enel Generación Perú S.A.A. and Compañía Energética Veracruz S.A.C. The total value of the transaction was approximately 1.4 billion US dollars.

== Finances ==
	2016	2017	2018	2019	2020	2021	2022	2023	2024	2025
Total revenue (€ bn)	70.6	74.6	75.6	80.3	64.9	88.0	140.5	95.6	78.9	80.3
Net profit (€ bn)	2.6	3.8	4.8	2.2	2.6	3.2	1.7	3.4	7.0	4.2
Total assets (€ bn)	156	156	165	171	163	207	220	195	187	179
Total equity (€ bn)	52.6	52.2	47.9	46.9	42.4	42.3	42.1	45.1	49.2	46.8
Employees (full time)	62,080	62,900	69,272	68,253	66,717	66,279	65,124	61,055	60,359	61,634

== See also ==
- Electricity sector in Italy
- Energy in Italy
- List of companies of Italy
