= Codroipo (electoral district) =

Electoral district in Italy

Friuli-Venezia Giulia - 04 (Codroipo)
- Former uninominal district for the Chamber of Deputies
- Region: Friuli-Venezia Giulia
- Major settlements: Codroipo; Gemona del Friuli; Tolmezzo

Former uninominal district
- Created: 2017
- Abolished: 2020
- Party: Forza Italia
- Member: Sandra Savino
- Elected: 2018

The Codroipo electoral district (official name: Friuli-Venezia Giulia - 04 uninominal district) was an uninominal district in Italy for the Chamber of Deputies, from 2017 to 2020.

== Territory ==
The district was part of the Friuli-Venezia Giulia electoral constituency.

The Codroipo district was composed of 86 comuni: Amaro, Ampezzo, Arba, Arta Terme, Artegna, Basiliano, Bertiolo, Bordano, Buja, Camino al Tagliamento, Cassacco, Castelnovo del Friuli, Cavasso Nuovo, Cavazzo Carnico, Cercivento, Chiusaforte, Clauzetto, Codroipo, Colloredo di Monte Albano, Comeglians, Coseano, Dignano, Dogna, Enemonzo, Fagagna, Fanna, Flaibano, Forgaria nel Friuli, Forni Avoltri, Forni di Sopra, Forni di Sotto, Frisanco, Gemona del Friuli, Lauco, Lestizza, Ligosullo, Magnano in Riviera, Majano, Malborghetto Valbruna, Martignacco, Mereto di Tomba, Moggio Udinese, Montenars, Moruzzo, Osoppo, Ovaro, Pagnacco, Paluzza, Pasian di Prato, Paularo, Pinzano al Tagliamento, Pontebba, Povoletto, Prato Carnico, Preone, Ragogna, Ravascletto, Raveo, Reana del Rojale, Resiutta, Rigolato, Rive d'Arcano, San Daniele del Friuli, San Vito di Fagagna, Sappada, Sauris, Sedegliano, Sequals, Socchieve, Sutrio, Tarcento, Tarvisio, Tolmezzo, Tramonti di Sopra, Tramonti di Sotto, Trasaghis, Travesio, Treppo Carnico, Treppo Grande, Tricesimo, Venzone, Verzegnis, Villa Santina, Vito d'Asio and Zuglio.

The district was part of the province of Udine and Pordenone.

The district was part of the Friuli-Venezia Giulia - 01 plurinominal district.

== Elected ==
Election	Deputy	Party
2018	Sandra Savino	Forza Italia

== Electoral results ==
2018 general election: Codroipo
Party	Candidate	Votes	%	±%
Forza Italia	Sandra Savino	61 861	47,89	New
Five Star Movement	Aulo Cimenti	29 351	22,72	New
Democratic Party	Silvana Cremaschi	26 257	20,33	New
Free and Equal	Carlo Pegorer	3 392	2,63	New
CasaPound	Serena Sant	1 957	1,52	New
Pact for Autonomy	Massimo Moretuzzo	1 902	1,47	New

Candidates	Party	Votes	%
Sandra Savino	Lega Nord FVG	39 894	30,86
Sandra Savino	Forza Italia	12 820	9,92
Sandra Savino	Brothers of Italy	6 872	5,32
Sandra Savino	Us with Italy-UDC	2 275	1,76
Aulo Cimenti	Five Star Movement	29 351	22,71
Silvana Cremaschi	Democratic Party	21 492	16,63
Silvana Cremaschi	More Europe	3 472	2,69
Silvana Cremaschi	Italy Europe Together	792	0,61
Silvana Cremaschi	Popular Civic	501	0,39
Carlo Pegorer	Free and Equal	3 392	2,62
Serena Sant	CasaPound	1 957	1,51
Massimo Moretuzzo	Pact for Autonomy	1 902	1,47
Others	Others	4 539	3,52
