= List of municipalities of Friuli-Venezia Giulia =

Location of Friuli-Venezia Giulia within Italy

Provinces of Friuli-Venezia Giulia

This is a list of the municipalities (comuni) of the autonomous region of Friuli-Venezia Giulia in Italy.

There are 215 municipalities in the now-abolished provinces of Friuli-Venezia Giulia as of 2026:

- 25 in the Province of Gorizia
- 50 in the Province of Pordenone
- 6 in the Province of Trieste
- 134 in the Province of Udine

== List ==
Municipality	Province	Population (2026)	Area (km²)	Density
Aiello del Friuli	Udine	2,086	13.35	156.3
Amaro	Udine	854	33.26	25.7
Ampezzo	Udine	877	73.63	11.9
Andreis	Pordenone	243	26.95	9.0
Aquileia	Udine	3,124	37.44	83.4
Arba	Pordenone	1,344	15.31	87.8
Arta Terme	Udine	1,971	42.77	46.1
Artegna	Udine	2,898	11.22	258.3
Attimis	Udine	1,664	33.24	50.1
Aviano	Pordenone	8,973	113.35	79.2
Azzano Decimo	Pordenone	15,760	51.34	307.0
Bagnaria Arsa	Udine	3,403	19.23	177.0
Barcis	Pordenone	225	103.41	2.2
Basiliano	Udine	5,148	43.05	119.6
Bertiolo	Udine	2,330	26.07	89.4
Bicinicco	Udine	1,733	16.01	108.2
Bordano	Udine	689	14.90	46.2
Brugnera	Pordenone	9,192	29.12	315.7
Budoia	Pordenone	2,561	37.36	68.5
Buja	Udine	6,336	25.51	248.4
Buttrio	Udine	3,898	17.78	219.2
Camino al Tagliamento	Udine	1,508	22.32	67.6
Campoformido	Udine	7,832	21.93	357.1
Campolongo Tapogliano	Udine	1,105	11.02	100.3
Caneva	Pordenone	6,194	41.79	148.2
Capriva del Friuli	Gorizia	1,566	6.32	247.8
Carlino	Udine	2,606	30.23	86.2
Casarsa della Delizia	Pordenone	8,314	20.47	406.2
Cassacco	Udine	2,787	11.68	238.6
Castelnovo del Friuli	Pordenone	800	22.48	35.6
Castions di Strada	Udine	3,682	32.83	112.2
Cavasso Nuovo	Pordenone	1,463	10.60	138.0
Cavazzo Carnico	Udine	959	39.44	24.3
Cercivento	Udine	604	15.78	38.3
Cervignano del Friuli	Udine	13,743	29.17	471.1
Chions	Pordenone	4,991	33.45	149.2
Chiopris-Viscone	Udine	707	9.21	76.8
Chiusaforte	Udine	582	100.20	5.8
Cimolais	Pordenone	343	100.86	3.4
Cividale del Friuli	Udine	10,804	50.65	213.3
Claut	Pordenone	855	165.91	5.2
Clauzetto	Pordenone	385	28.31	13.6
Codroipo	Udine	15,721	75.22	209.0
Colloredo di Monte Albano	Udine	2,184	21.75	100.4
Comeglians	Udine	422	19.41	21.7
Cordenons	Pordenone	17,701	56.34	314.2
Cordovado	Pordenone	2,671	12.02	222.2
Cormons	Gorizia	7,001	35.09	199.5
Corno di Rosazzo	Udine	3,099	12.62	245.6
Coseano	Udine	1,977	23.80	83.1
Dignano	Udine	2,221	27.54	80.6
Doberdò del Lago	Gorizia	1,293	27.05	47.8
Dogna	Udine	148	70.37	2.1
Dolegna del Collio	Gorizia	285	12.88	22.1
Drenchia	Udine	88	12.01	7.3
Duino-Aurisina	Trieste	8,185	45.31	180.6
Enemonzo	Udine	1,231	23.76	51.8
Erto e Casso	Pordenone	359	52.43	6.8
Faedis	Udine	2,731	46.78	58.4
Fagagna	Udine	6,076	37.19	163.4
Fanna	Pordenone	1,467	10.26	143.0
Farra d'Isonzo	Gorizia	1,681	10.25	164.0
Fiume Veneto	Pordenone	11,806	35.76	330.1
Fiumicello Villa Vicentina	Udine	6,251	28.79	217.1
Flaibano	Udine	1,113	17.32	64.3
Fogliano Redipuglia	Gorizia	2,966	7.92	374.5
Fontanafredda	Pordenone	12,952	46.40	279.1
Forgaria nel Friuli	Udine	1,667	28.94	57.6
Forni Avoltri	Udine	495	80.75	6.1
Forni di Sopra	Udine	890	81.66	10.9
Forni di Sotto	Udine	518	93.60	5.5
Frisanco	Pordenone	599	60.99	9.8
Gemona del Friuli	Udine	10,416	56.06	185.8
Gonars	Udine	4,552	19.82	229.7
Gorizia	Gorizia	33,679	41.26	816.3
Gradisca d'Isonzo	Gorizia	6,394	11.22	569.9
Grado	Gorizia	7,454	111.33	67.0
Grimacco	Udine	299	16.11	18.6
Latisana	Udine	13,162	37.80	348.2
Lauco	Udine	626	34.76	18.0
Lestizza	Udine	3,569	34.32	104.0
Lignano Sabbiadoro	Udine	6,973	15.71	443.9
Lusevera	Udine	611	53.05	11.5
Magnano in Riviera	Udine	2,232	8.34	267.6
Majano	Udine	5,703	28.28	201.7
Malborghetto Valbruna	Udine	888	124.21	7.1
Maniago	Pordenone	11,444	69.46	164.8
Manzano	Udine	6,275	31.04	202.2
Marano Lagunare	Udine	1,677	85.80	19.5
Mariano del Friuli	Gorizia	1,478	8.59	172.1
Martignacco	Udine	6,835	26.68	256.2
Medea	Gorizia	956	7.36	129.9
Meduno	Pordenone	1,480	31.59	46.9
Mereto di Tomba	Udine	2,497	27.21	91.8
Moggio Udinese	Udine	1,589	142.44	11.2
Moimacco	Udine	1,567	11.77	133.1
Monfalcone	Gorizia	30,767	19.73	1,559.4
Monrupino	Trieste	836	12.61	66.3
Montenars	Udine	494	20.59	24.0
Montereale Valcellina	Pordenone	4,187	67.88	61.7
Moraro	Gorizia	722	3.57	202.2
Morsano al Tagliamento	Pordenone	2,754	32.54	84.6
Mortegliano	Udine	4,839	30.05	161.0
Moruzzo	Udine	2,392	17.78	134.5
Mossa	Gorizia	1,512	6.21	243.5
Muggia	Trieste	12,627	13.85	911.7
Muzzana del Turgnano	Udine	2,320	24.29	95.5
Nimis	Udine	2,628	33.90	77.5
Osoppo	Udine	2,803	22.40	125.1
Ovaro	Udine	1,686	57.90	29.1
Pagnacco	Udine	5,080	14.93	340.3
Palazzolo dello Stella	Udine	2,893	34.55	83.7
Palmanova	Udine	5,282	13.30	397.1
Paluzza	Udine	1,892	69.75	27.1
Pasian di Prato	Udine	9,291	15.41	602.9
Pasiano di Pordenone	Pordenone	7,890	45.60	173.0
Paularo	Udine	2,278	84.24	27.0
Pavia di Udine	Udine	5,466	34.34	159.2
Pinzano al Tagliamento	Pordenone	1,493	21.95	68.0
Pocenia	Udine	2,287	23.98	95.4
Polcenigo	Pordenone	3,060	49.69	61.6
Pontebba	Udine	1,292	99.66	13.0
Porcia	Pordenone	14,947	29.53	506.2
Pordenone	Pordenone	52,744	38.21	1,380.4
Porpetto	Udine	2,425	18.05	134.3
Povoletto	Udine	5,387	38.41	140.2
Pozzuolo del Friuli	Udine	6,891	34.37	200.5
Pradamano	Udine	3,536	15.91	222.3
Prata di Pordenone	Pordenone	8,353	22.96	363.8
Prato Carnico	Udine	796	81.72	9.7
Pravisdomini	Pordenone	3,471	16.21	214.1
Precenicco	Udine	1,464	27.23	53.8
Premariacco	Udine	3,919	39.89	98.2
Preone	Udine	247	22.47	11.0
Prepotto	Udine	696	33.24	20.9
Pulfero	Udine	832	48.68	17.1
Ragogna	Udine	2,843	22.03	129.1
Ravascletto	Udine	497	26.48	18.8
Raveo	Udine	425	12.60	33.7
Reana del Rojale	Udine	4,723	20.33	232.3
Remanzacco	Udine	5,904	30.99	190.5
Resia	Udine	904	119.31	7.6
Resiutta	Udine	266	20.36	13.1
Rigolato	Udine	354	30.77	11.5
Rive d'Arcano	Udine	2,400	22.57	106.3
Rivignano Teor	Udine	6,309	47.76	132.1
Romans d'Isonzo	Gorizia	3,556	15.50	229.4
Ronchi dei Legionari	Gorizia	11,859	17.11	693.1
Ronchis	Udine	1,939	18.40	105.4
Roveredo in Piano	Pordenone	5,760	15.86	363.2
Ruda	Udine	2,802	19.47	143.9
Sacile	Pordenone	19,947	32.74	609.3
Sagrado	Gorizia	2,132	13.94	152.9
San Canzian d'Isonzo	Gorizia	6,048	33.89	178.5
San Daniele del Friuli	Udine	7,909	34.78	227.4
San Dorligo della Valle	Trieste	5,622	24.22	232.1
San Floriano del Collio	Gorizia	718	10.63	67.5
San Giorgio della Richinvelda	Pordenone	4,541	48.15	94.3
San Giorgio di Nogaro	Udine	7,285	25.94	280.8
San Giovanni al Natisone	Udine	5,995	24.06	249.2
San Leonardo	Udine	1,021	26.91	37.9
San Lorenzo Isontino	Gorizia	1,479	4.40	336.1
San Martino al Tagliamento	Pordenone	1,517	17.98	84.4
San Pier d'Isonzo	Gorizia	1,914	9.03	212.0
San Pietro al Natisone	Udine	2,069	23.97	86.3
San Quirino	Pordenone	4,333	51.76	83.7
San Vito al Tagliamento	Pordenone	15,293	60.88	251.2
San Vito al Torre	Udine	1,223	11.92	102.6
San Vito di Fagagna	Udine	1,668	8.57	194.6
Santa Maria la Longa	Udine	2,303	19.60	117.5
Sappada	Udine	1,301	62.06	21.0
Sauris	Udine	375	41.49	9.0
Savogna	Udine	349	22.17	15.7
Savogna d'Isonzo	Gorizia	1,678	16.98	98.8
Sedegliano	Udine	3,695	50.53	73.1
Sequals	Pordenone	2,212	27.70	79.9
Sesto al Reghena	Pordenone	6,299	40.68	154.8
Sgonico	Trieste	1,948	31.40	62.0
Socchieve	Udine	846	66.12	12.8
Spilimbergo	Pordenone	11,799	71.88	164.1
Staranzano	Gorizia	7,130	19.66	362.7
Stregna	Udine	289	19.69	14.7
Sutrio	Udine	1,191	20.75	57.4
Taipana	Udine	529	65.44	8.1
Talmassons	Udine	3,821	43.05	88.8
Tarcento	Udine	8,886	35.42	250.9
Tarvisio	Udine	3,850	208.36	18.5
Tavagnacco	Udine	14,583	15.37	948.8
Terzo d'Aquileia	Udine	2,705	28.36	95.4
Tolmezzo	Udine	9,638	64.62	149.1
Torreano	Udine	2,043	34.99	58.4
Torviscosa	Udine	2,572	48.62	52.9
Tramonti di Sopra	Pordenone	274	125.15	2.2
Tramonti di Sotto	Pordenone	335	85.55	3.9
Trasaghis	Udine	2,060	77.85	26.5
Travesio	Pordenone	1,809	28.38	63.7
Treppo Grande	Udine	1,724	11.32	152.3
Treppo Ligosullo	Udine	654	35.59	18.4
Tricesimo	Udine	7,605	17.68	430.1
Trieste	Trieste	198,622	85.11	2,333.7
Trivignano Udinese	Udine	1,514	18.46	82.0
Turriaco	Gorizia	2,784	5.18	537.5
Udine	Udine	98,501	57.17	1,722.9
Vajont	Pordenone	1,599	1.59	1,005.7
Valvasone Arzene	Pordenone	3,960	29.68	133.4
Varmo	Udine	2,605	34.92	74.6
Venzone	Udine	1,941	54.55	35.6
Verzegnis	Udine	834	39.33	21.2
Villa Santina	Udine	2,153	12.99	165.7
Villesse	Gorizia	1,665	12.05	138.2
Visco	Udine	838	3.52	238.1
Vito d'Asio	Pordenone	705	53.72	13.1
Vivaro	Pordenone	1,350	37.68	35.8
Zoppola	Pordenone	8,360	45.54	183.6
Zuglio	Udine	535	18.21	29.4

== See also ==
- List of municipalities of Italy
- List of Friulian place names
