= List of municipalities of the Province of Udine =

This is a list of the 134 municipalities (comuni) of the Province of Udine in the autonomous region of Friuli-Venezia Giulia in Italy.

== List ==
Municipality	Population (2026)	Area (km^{2})	Density
Aiello del Friuli	2,086	13.35	156.3
Amaro	854	33.26	25.7
Ampezzo	877	73.63	11.9
Aquileia	3,124	37.44	83.4
Arta Terme	1,971	42.77	46.1
Artegna	2,898	11.22	258.3
Attimis	1,664	33.24	50.1
Bagnaria Arsa	3,403	19.23	177.0
Basiliano	5,148	43.05	119.6
Bertiolo	2,330	26.07	89.4
Bicinicco	1,733	16.01	108.2
Bordano	689	14.90	46.2
Buja	6,336	25.51	248.4
Buttrio	3,898	17.78	219.2
Camino al Tagliamento	1,508	22.32	67.6
Campoformido	7,832	21.93	357.1
Campolongo Tapogliano	1,105	11.02	100.3
Carlino	2,606	30.23	86.2
Cassacco	2,787	11.68	238.6
Castions di Strada	3,682	32.83	112.2
Cavazzo Carnico	959	39.44	24.3
Cercivento	604	15.78	38.3
Cervignano del Friuli	13,743	29.17	471.1
Chiopris-Viscone	707	9.21	76.8
Chiusaforte	582	100.20	5.8
Cividale del Friuli	10,804	50.65	213.3
Codroipo	15,721	75.22	209.0
Colloredo di Monte Albano	2,184	21.75	100.4
Comeglians	422	19.41	21.7
Corno di Rosazzo	3,099	12.62	245.6
Coseano	1,977	23.80	83.1
Dignano	2,221	27.54	80.6
Dogna	148	70.37	2.1
Drenchia	88	12.01	7.3
Enemonzo	1,231	23.76	51.8
Faedis	2,731	46.78	58.4
Fagagna	6,076	37.19	163.4
Fiumicello Villa Vicentina	6,251	28.79	217.1
Flaibano	1,113	17.32	64.3
Forgaria nel Friuli	1,667	28.94	57.6
Forni Avoltri	495	80.75	6.1
Forni di Sopra	890	81.66	10.9
Forni di Sotto	518	93.60	5.5
Gemona del Friuli	10,416	56.06	185.8
Gonars	4,552	19.82	229.7
Grimacco	299	16.11	18.6
Latisana	13,162	37.80	348.2
Lauco	626	34.76	18.0
Lestizza	3,569	34.32	104.0
Lignano Sabbiadoro	6,973	15.71	443.9
Lusevera	611	53.05	11.5
Magnano in Riviera	2,232	8.34	267.6
Majano	5,703	28.28	201.7
Malborghetto Valbruna	888	124.21	7.1
Manzano	6,275	31.04	202.2
Marano Lagunare	1,677	85.80	19.5
Martignacco	6,835	26.68	256.2
Mereto di Tomba	2,497	27.21	91.8
Moggio Udinese	1,589	142.44	11.2
Moimacco	1,567	11.77	133.1
Montenars	494	20.59	24.0
Mortegliano	4,839	30.05	161.0
Moruzzo	2,392	17.78	134.5
Muzzana del Turgnano	2,320	24.29	95.5
Nimis	2,628	33.90	77.5
Osoppo	2,803	22.40	125.1
Ovaro	1,686	57.90	29.1
Pagnacco	5,080	14.93	340.3
Palazzolo dello Stella	2,893	34.55	83.7
Palmanova	5,282	13.30	397.1
Paluzza	1,892	69.75	27.1
Pasian di Prato	9,291	15.41	602.9
Paularo	2,278	84.24	27.0
Pavia di Udine	5,466	34.34	159.2
Pocenia	2,287	23.98	95.4
Pontebba	1,292	99.66	13.0
Porpetto	2,425	18.05	134.3
Povoletto	5,387	38.41	140.2
Pozzuolo del Friuli	6,891	34.37	200.5
Pradamano	3,536	15.91	222.3
Prato Carnico	796	81.72	9.7
Precenicco	1,464	27.23	53.8
Premariacco	3,919	39.89	98.2
Preone	247	22.47	11.0
Prepotto	696	33.24	20.9
Pulfero	832	48.68	17.1
Ragogna	2,843	22.03	129.1
Ravascletto	497	26.48	18.8
Raveo	425	12.60	33.7
Reana del Rojale	4,723	20.33	232.3
Remanzacco	5,904	30.99	190.5
Resia	904	119.31	7.6
Resiutta	266	20.36	13.1
Rigolato	354	30.77	11.5
Rive d'Arcano	2,400	22.57	106.3
Rivignano Teor	6,309	47.76	132.1
Ronchis	1,939	18.40	105.4
Ruda	2,802	19.47	143.9
San Daniele del Friuli	7,909	34.78	227.4
San Giorgio di Nogaro	7,285	25.94	280.8
San Giovanni al Natisone	5,995	24.06	249.2
San Leonardo	1,021	26.91	37.9
San Pietro al Natisone	2,069	23.97	86.3
San Vito al Torre	1,223	11.92	102.6
San Vito di Fagagna	1,668	8.57	194.6
Santa Maria la Longa	2,303	19.60	117.5
Sappada	1,301	62.06	21.0
Sauris	375	41.49	9.0
Savogna	349	22.17	15.7
Sedegliano	3,695	50.53	73.1
Socchieve	846	66.12	12.8
Stregna	289	19.69	14.7
Sutrio	1,191	20.75	57.4
Taipana	529	65.44	8.1
Talmassons	3,821	43.05	88.8
Tarcento	8,886	35.42	250.9
Tarvisio	3,850	208.36	18.5
Tavagnacco	14,583	15.37	948.8
Terzo d'Aquileia	2,705	28.36	95.4
Tolmezzo	9,638	64.62	149.1
Torreano	2,043	34.99	58.4
Torviscosa	2,572	48.62	52.9
Trasaghis	2,060	77.85	26.5
Treppo Grande	1,724	11.32	152.3
Treppo Ligosullo	654	35.59	18.4
Tricesimo	7,605	17.68	430.1
Trivignano Udinese	1,514	18.46	82.0
Udine	98,501	57.17	1,722.9
Varmo	2,605	34.92	74.6
Venzone	1,941	54.55	35.6
Verzegnis	834	39.33	21.2
Villa Santina	2,153	12.99	165.7
Visco	838	3.52	238.1
Zuglio	535	18.21	29.4

== See also ==
- List of municipalities of Friuli-Venezia Giulia
- List of municipalities of Italy
