= Carnia =

Historical-geographic region in the northeastern Italian area of Friuli

Coordinates: 46.3944°N 12.7742°E

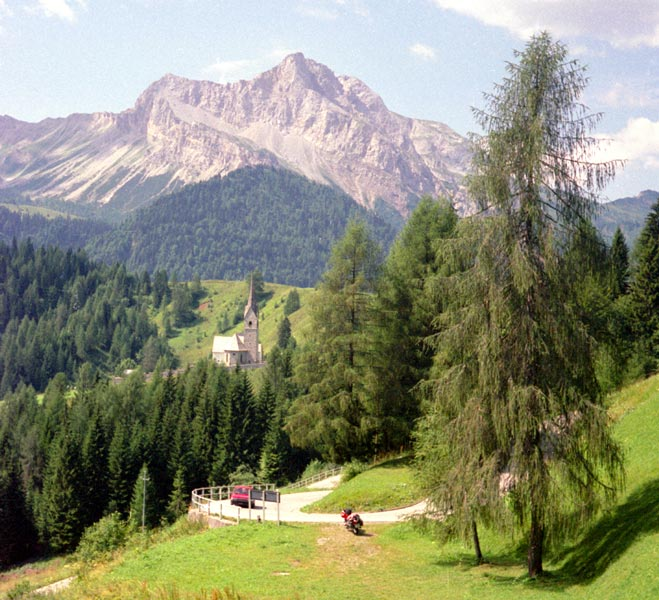
Monte Bìvera near Sauris

Carnia (Friulian: Cjargne or Cjargna/Cjargno in local variants, Venetian: Ciargna, German: Karnien, Slovene: Karnija) is a historical-geographic region in the northeastern Italian area of Friuli. Its 27 municipalities all belong to the province of Udine, which itself is part of the autonomous Friuli-Venezia Giulia region.

== History ==
Settlement area of the Carni in Roman Cisalpine Gaul

The name of the region, like neighbouring Carinthia and Carniola (and quite possibly also Karst), probably derives from the Carni, a Celtic tribe who had lived for centuries in the fertile plains between the Rhine and the Danube rivers where other Celtic peoples lived. Starting from 1400 BC, the demographic growth and the pressure of the Germanic peoples, originated a migratory flood towards the south. The Carni crossed the Alps via the Plöcken Pass and settled in the region which is nowadays named Carnia and in the piedmont zone of Friuli. They practiced hunting and breeding. During the hard winters the herders used to move with their cattle down to the piedmont plains. Also they were skilful iron and wood manufacturers. The Carni were headed by a king and a sacerdotal caste of druids.

=== Antiquity ===
The first historical date related to the arrival of the Carni is 186 BC, when some 50,000 Carni, composed of armed men, women and children descended towards the plains (in which they previously used to winter) and on a hill they founded a stable defensive settlement, Akileja. The Romans, concerned by the expansion of this people, in 183 BC forced back the Carni to the mountains, they destroyed their settlement and they founded a defensive settlement at the north-east boundaries. The new settlement was named Aquileia, after the former Celtic name Akileja. The triumvirs that founded that settlement were Publius Scipio Nasica, Caius Flaminius and Lucius Manlius Acidinus.

In order to stem the Roman expansion and to acquire the fertile and more hospitable plains, the Carni tried to form alliances with the Histrian, the Iapode, and the Taurisci Celts. As Rome, in turn, was more and more becoming aware of the impending danger coming from the Carni and as it wanted to accelerate its own expansion, it sent to the north-east the legions of consul Marcus Aemilius Scaurus, who finally defeated the Carni in a battle of 15 November 115 BC.

Later on, the Carni, characterised by a docile temper and who had been defeated in battle, submitted to Rome, accepting its commands and its concessions. In the course of the following centuries, the Carni and Roman customs and blood, along with the aboriginal Raeti, would get mixed and this union of deeply different cultures would slowly give rise to a new people, the Aquileiese or new Friulan People. The old, dating to 1400BC. The mixing of the Latin, Celtic and Raetic languages would give rise to the New Friulan language. In the meantime Aquileia enlarged its importance. It became a Municipium Romanum in 90 BC; it was an important commercial and hand-craft production centre. Also it was the main port on the Adriatic Sea and a garrison settlement.

=== Middle Ages ===
Upon the Decline of the Roman Empire and the Migration Period, the area was subdued by invading Germanic Ostrogoths under Theodoric the Great and later by the Lombards, who incorporated it into the Duchy of Friuli, part of their Italian kingdom. With adjacent Carantania, Carnia was conquered by Frankish forces in the 774 campaign of Charlemagne. The Friulian dukes, successors of Hrodgaud (d. 776), continued to rule as Carolingian vassals until the deposition of Duke Baldric of Friuli by Emperor Louis the Pious in 828, when it finally became a Carolingian march. In the 843 Treaty of Verdun, the area south of the main chain of the Carnic Alps was attributed to the realm of Emperor Lothair I ("Middle Francia"), it was inherited by his eldest son, King Louis II of Italy in 855.

When in 888 Margrave Berengar I of Friuli was crowned King of Italy, he moved his residence to Verona and established the large Italian Marca Veronensis et Aquileiensis, comprising Friuli with Carnia, Veneto (except for Venice itself) and Trentino. In 951 Berengar's grandson King Berengar II of Italy had to lay down arms against the invading forces of King Otto I of Germany. At the 952 Imperial Diet of Augsburg, he had to declare himself an East Frankish vassal, and the whole Veronese march came under the rule of the German stem duchy of Bavaria. In 976 it became part of the newly established Duchy of Carinthia.

Carnia and Carinthia again went separate ways, when in 1077 King Henry IV of Germany during the Investiture Controversy with Pope Gregory VII split off large parts of Friuli to establish the Patriarchate of Aquileia as an Imperial State. As the patriarchate was gradually conquered by the Republic of Venice, Carnia had passed from the Holy Roman Empire to the Venetian Domini di Terraferma by 1420.

== Language ==
Italian is the official language. Nevertheless, Friulian, a Rhaeto-Romance language, is widely spoken. The German Southern Bavarian dialect is spoken in the linguistic enclaves of Sauris (Zahre), Paluzza-Timau (Tischlwang) and Sappada (Plodn), as in the neighbouring regions of Veneto (Seven Communities, Thirteen Communities) and Trentino (Luserna and Mocheni Valley).

== Geography ==
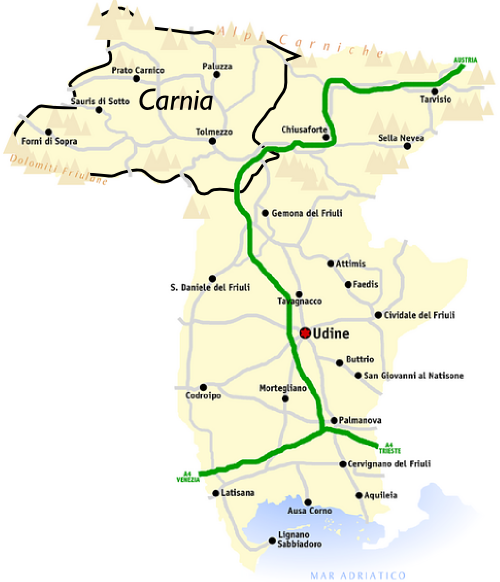
Carnia within the Udine province

Carnia is located south of the main chain of the Carnic Alps, in the northwest of the Udine province; it is bounded to the north by Austria and to the west by the Italian Veneto region. In the south it borders the Province of Pordenone and in the east the Canal del Ferro-Valcanale (Ferro-Valcanale outfall) separates it from the central and southern part of the Udine province. The region covers the western part of the mountainous region of the province, but not the eastern part (the Julian Alps), therefore it borders Veneto and the Austrian state of Carinthia, but not Slovenia. The main town is Tolmezzo.

=== Valleys ===
Carnia is formed of seven valleys. Through each of them runs a stream from which the valleys take their name (except for Valcalda). Each of these valleys is usually referred to as a canale (in Italian) / cjanâl (in Friulian), i.e. an outfall, to emphasize its long and narrow shape:

- Bût valley, Val Bût or Canale di San Pietro (in Friulian: Cjanâl di Sant Pieri)
- Degano valley, Val Degano or Canale di Gorto (in Friulian: Cjanâl di Guart)
- Lumiei valley, Val Lumiei (Valade dal Lumiei)
- Tagliamento valley, Val Tagliamento (in Friulian: Cjanâl di Soclêf or Petecarie)
- Pesarina valley, Val Pesarina (in Friulian: Cjanâl Pedarç)
- Chiarsò valley, Val Chiarsò or Canale di Incaroio (in Friulian: Cjanâl di Incjaroi)
- Valcalda valley, Valcalda (in Friulian: Valcjalde or Cjanâl di Monai)

Each of these valleys and their homonymous streams meet in a common valley floor where the main centre of Carnia is located: Tolmezzo

=== Municipalities ===
The following are the 27 municipalities of Carnia (next to the Italian name, the Friulian one is quoted):

Comune	Inhabitants (2006)	Area (km^{2})	Administrative Subdivisions
Amaro (Damâr)	811	33.26	-
Ampezzo (Dimpeç)	1,089	73.61	Oltris, Voltois
Arta Terme (Darte)	2,287	52.24	Avosacco, Cabia, Cedarchis, Lovea, Piano d'Arta, Piedim, Rivalpo, Valle
Cavazzo Carnico (Cjavaç)	1,108	38.69	Cesclans, Mena, Somplago
Cercivento (Çurçuvint)	748	15.36	Cercivento di Sotto, Cercivento di Sopra
Comeglians (Comelians, loc. Comalians)	603	19.52	Calgaretto, Maranzanis, Mieli, Noiaretto, Povolaro, Runchia, Tualis
Enemonzo (Enemonç)	1,389	23.70	Colza, Esemon di Sotto, Fresis, Maiaso, Quinis, Tartinis
Forni Avoltri (For di Avoltri, loc. Fôr Davuatri)	681	80.71	Collina, Collinetta, Frassenetto, Sigilletto
Forni di Sopra (Fôr Disore)	1,087	81.16	Andrazza, Cella, Vico
Forni di Sotto (Fôr Disot)	701	93.54	Tredolo, Baselia, Vico
Lauco (Lauc)	819	34.58	Allegnidis, Avaglio, Buttea, Chiassis, Trava, Vinaio
Ovaro (Davâr)	2,126	57.88	Agrons, Cella, Chialina, Clavais, Cludinico, Entrampo, Lenzone, Liariis, Luincis, Luint, Mione, Muina, Ovasta
Paluzza (Paluce)	2,494	69.96	Casteons, Cleulis, Rivo, Timau
Paularo (Paulâr, locally Dincjaroi)	2,855	84.23	Casaso, Chiaulis, Dierico, Misincinis, Ravinis, Rio, Salino, Trelli, Villafuori, Villamezzo
Prato Carnico (Prât)	1,007	81.48	Avausa, Croce, Osais, Pesariis, Pieria, Pradumbli, Prico, Sostasio, Truia
Preone (Preon)	297	22.51	-
Ravascletto (Ravasclêt, locally Monai)	596	26.32	Salars, Zovello
Raveo (Raviei)	480	12.63	Esemon di Sopra
Rigolato (Rigulât)	579	30.47	Givigliana, Gracco, Ludaria, Magnanins, Stalis, Tors, Valpicetto, Vuezzis
Sauris (Zahre, in the local German dialect)	427	41.52	La Màina, Latéis, Sàuris di Sotto, Sàuris di Sopra, Velt
Socchieve (Soclêf)	950	65.95	Caprizzi, Dilignìdis, Feltrone, Lungis, Mediis, Nonta, Priuso, Viaso
Sutrio (Sudri)	1,393	21.06	Nojaris, Priola
Treppo Ligosullo (Trep and Liussûl)	715	35.59	Gleris, Murzalis, Siaio, Tausia, Zenodis
Verzegnis (loc. Verzegnas)	924	38.80	Chiaicis, Chiaulis, Intissans, Villa
Villa Santina (Vile)	2,234	13.00	Invillino
Zuglio (Zui)	633	8.31	Fielis, Formeaso, Sezza
Tolmezzo (Tumieç)	10,539	65.69	Cadunea, Caneva, Casanova, Cazzaso, Fusea, Illegio, Imponzo, Terzo
Total	39,705	1,221.64	124

=== Mountains ===
Carnia's mountains are composed by different geologic belts. They are made of three different types of rock: limestone, dolomite and flint.

Carnia is spanned by the southern slope of the Carnic Alps, which extend from Passo di Monte Croce di Comelico to sella di Camporosso, where Alpi Giulie begin and rise (on the Italian side) between Fella and the upper Isonzo rivers, and the adjacent Carnic Prealps. The north side of the Carnic ridge sets up the boundary with Austria; on the south it is delimited by the stream Pontebbana, and, on the upper side of Pontebba, by the flow of the Fella. Mount Coglians (m. 2780) is the highest peak of the Carnic Alps. Together with the cluster of Creta delle Cjanevate it forms an impressive horst at the Austrian boundary. Other main peaks of Carnia are:

- Mount Peralba m 2,694
- Mount Cridola m 2,580
- Mount Fleons m 2,507
- Mount Pramaggiore m 2,479
- Mount Bìvera m 2,472
- Mount Volaia m 2,470
- Creta Forata m 2,462
- Mount Siera m 2,443
- Mount Tiarfin m 2,417
- Mount Crostis m 2,252
- Creta di Timau m 2,218
- Mount Sernio m 2,190
- Mount Tinisa m 2,120

=== Rivers ===
The most important river is the Tagliamento, which springs near the Mauria Pass (in the municipality of Lorenzago di Cadore) at an altitude of around 1000 meters. Along its long way throughout Carnia, the Tagliamento river receives water from 6 tributaries, all coming from left with respect to it: the Bût, the Degano, the Lumiei, the Pesarina, the Chiarsò, and the Monai, which name the valleys they lie in.

=== Flora ===
Forests are large and mostly composed of fir, beech, and larch. Pastures are located mainly at high altitudes, on sunny slopes which are not suitable for agriculture.

In Carnia 2,000 vegetable species, about a thousand types of mushrooms, and some fifty types of orchids are grown.

Vegetation in Carnia changes with altitude. Up to the elevation of 400–500 metres stand durmast and chestnut forests and some submontane cultivation zones, but very soon thereafter they are replaced by the mountain flora, typical of the forests: beechwood, fir-wood, and pine-wood. Above 1,500 m, the arboreal vegetation becomes rather poor, and trees become more and more sparse, small and stunted up to the tree line, which in Carnia stands at 1,700 metres – the lowest of the Alpine regions Further on, only bushes and emerald-green pastures can be found.

In late spring on the highland pastures, a colourful display of wild azaleas and gentians can be observed.

=== Climate ===
The climate is severe, with very harsh winters and cool summers. It is characterised by strong winds and abundant precipitation. In comparison to the other areas of the Alps in Carnia the tree line is lower by about 400–500 m. For example, while in the Western Alps the vegetation stops growing above 2,300 m, in Carnia this is already the case at the elevation of 1,900 metres. This lower vegetation limit is due to the thermal inversion, caused by a constant outflow of a cold wind from the north-east (the "burano" wind), which reaches the region from the Danube plains and even Siberia.

=== Protected areas ===
In Carnia the following areas have been declared as protected:

- Friulian Dolomites Natural Park (Parco naturale delle Dolomiti Friulane), located in Forni di Sopra
- Intermunicipal Park of Carnic Hills (Parco intercomunale delle Colline Carniche), located in Villa Santina

== Photographic gallery ==
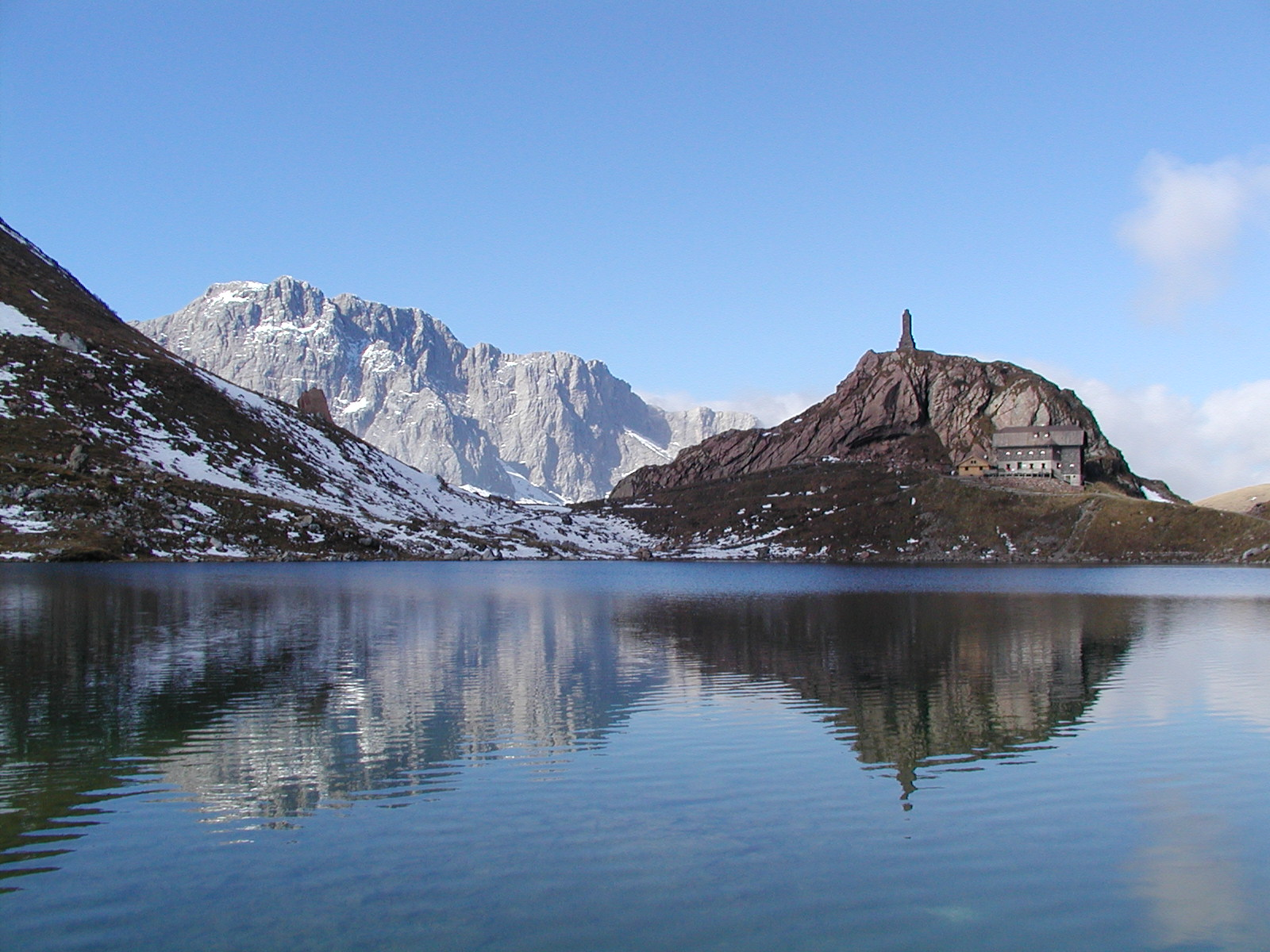
Volaia Lake

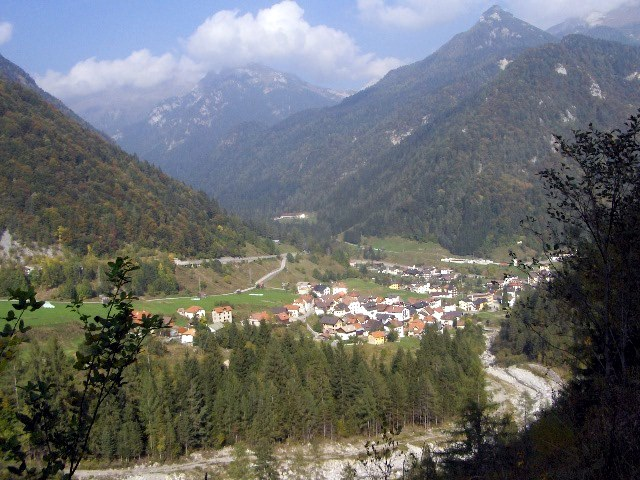
Forni Avoltri view

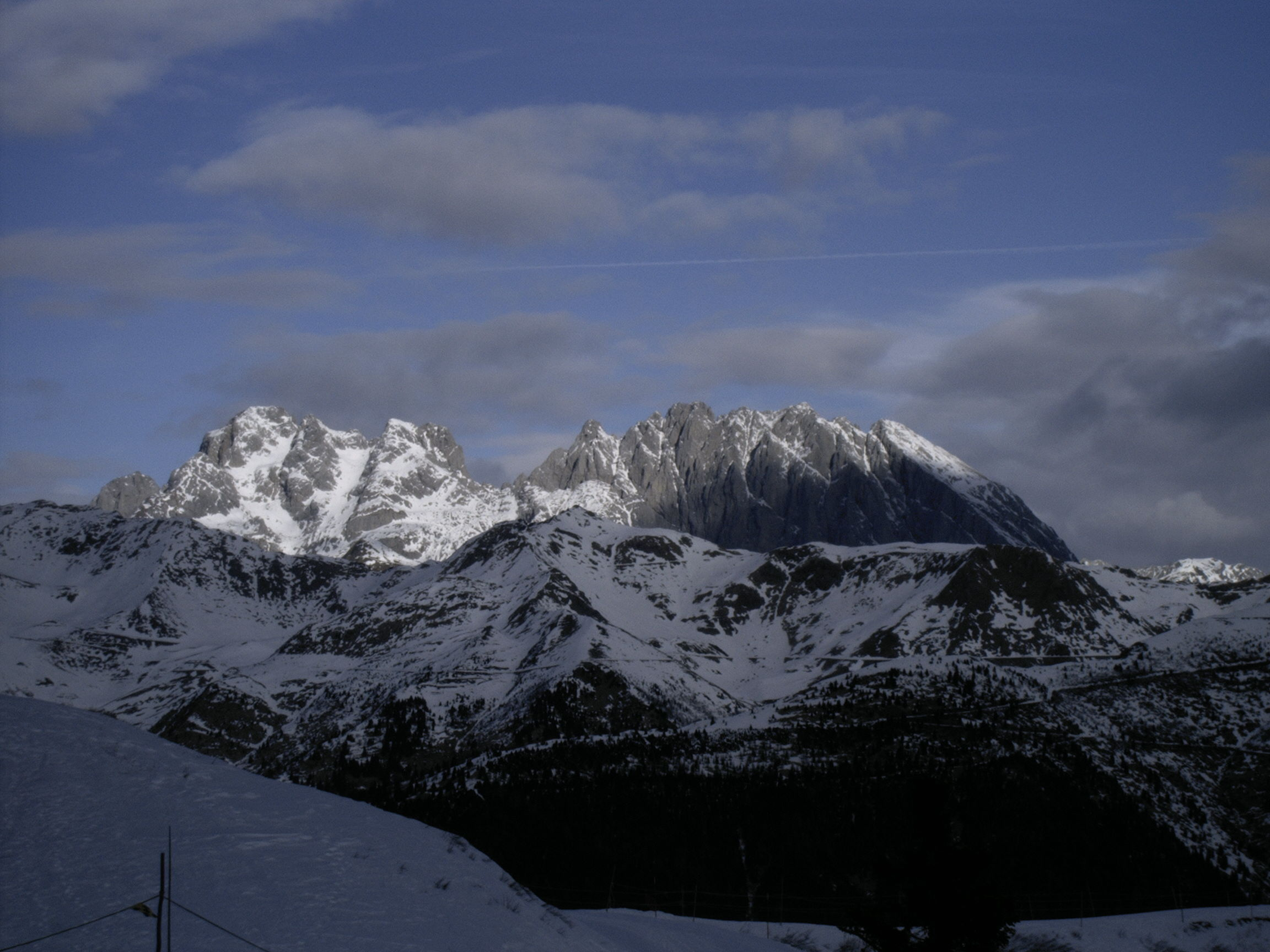
Mount Coglians

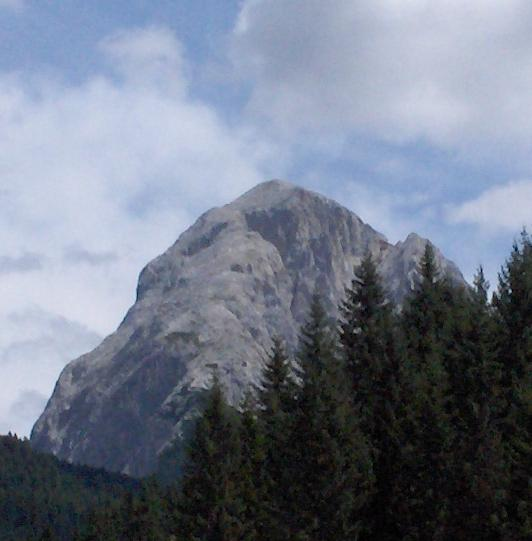
Mount Peralba

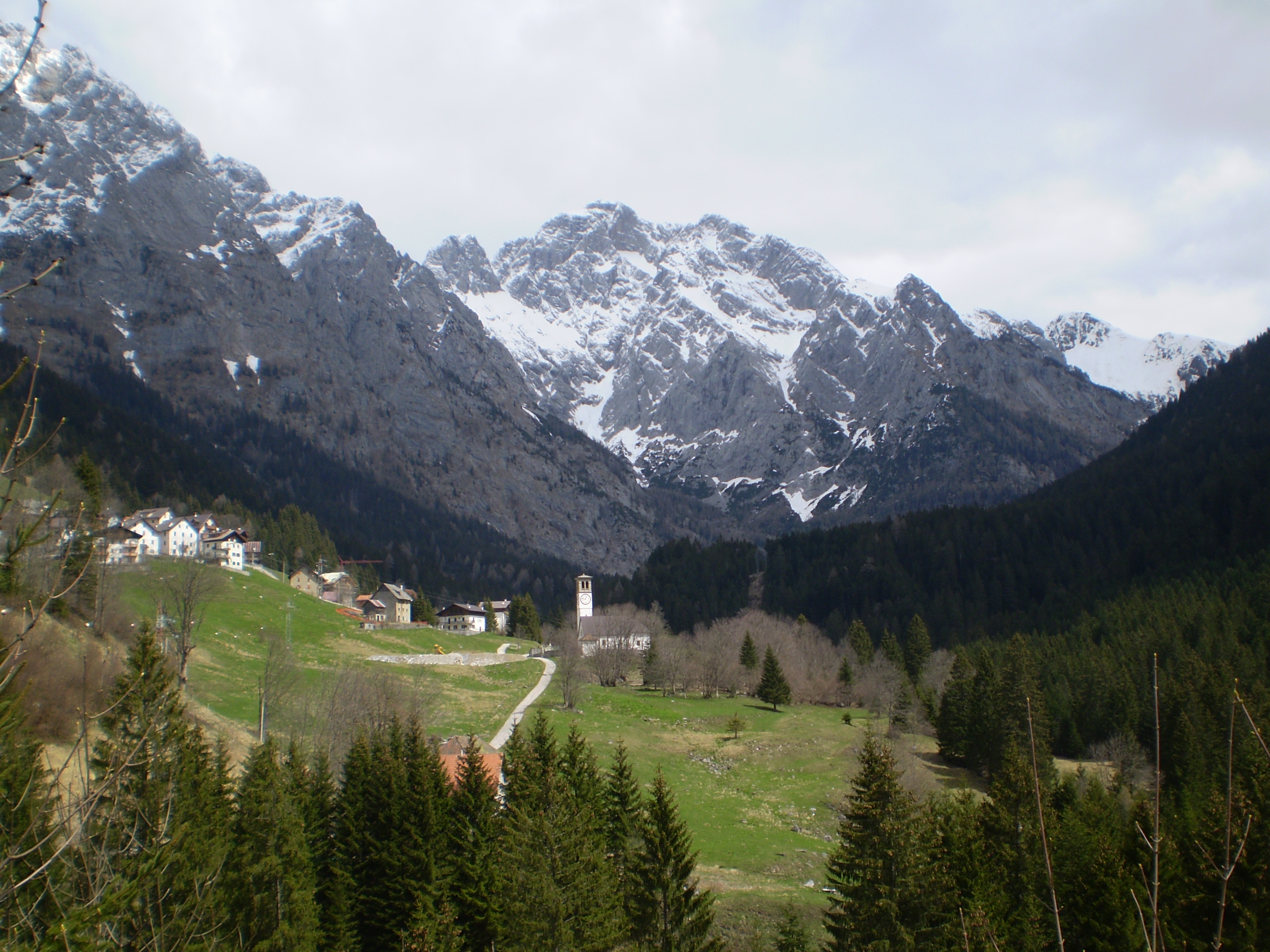
Collina, Forni Avoltri

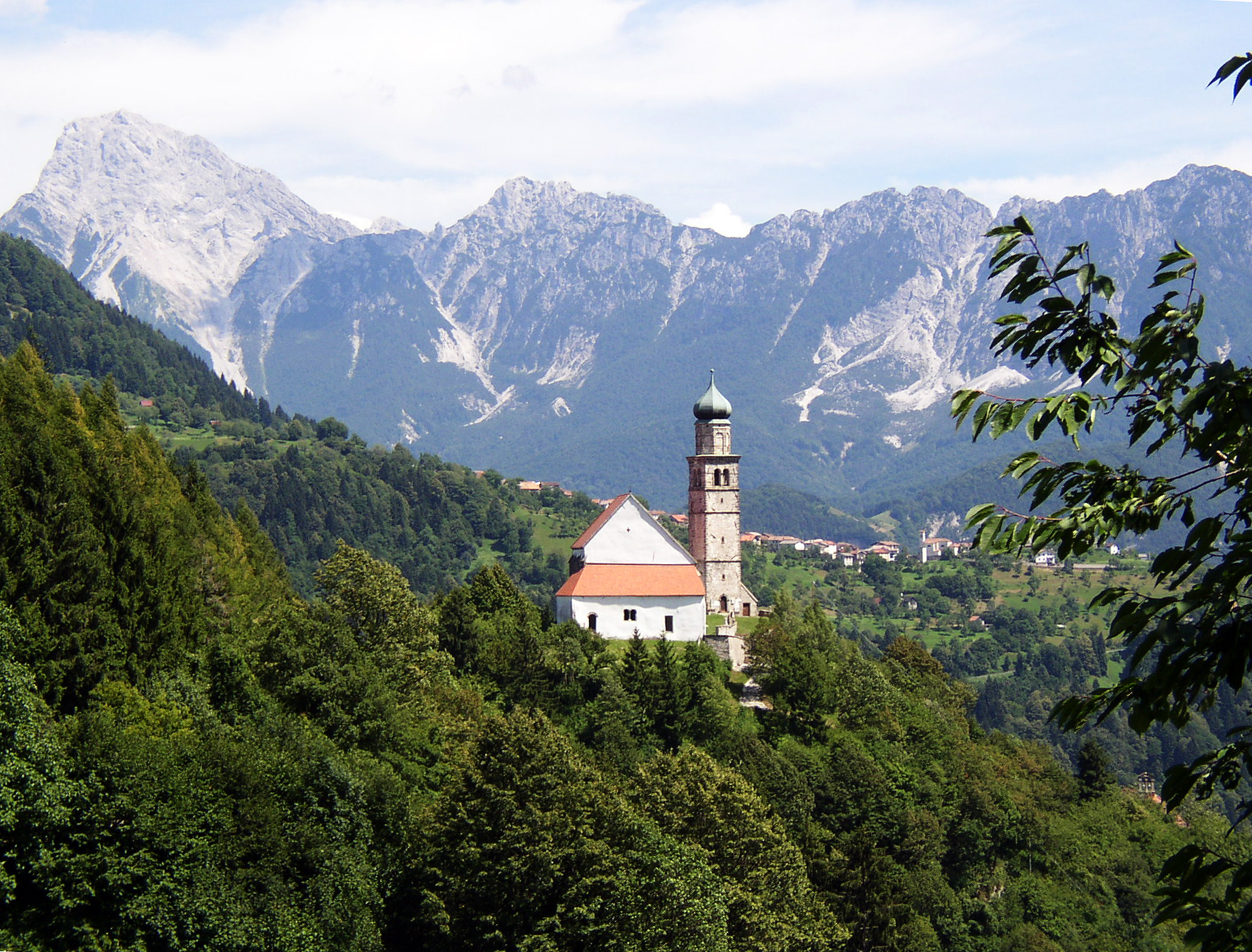
The Church of San Pietro in Carnia
