= Degano =

Degano is an Eastern Alpine surname of Germanic-Friulian origin.

Its place of maximum frequency is the province of Udine, in the Alpine region of Friuli.

It is a derivate of the evolution of the classic Old High German word "degan".

The first documented use of "degano" as a substantive is observed in the epic poem "Hildebrandslied" of langobardic origin, written in Old High German with Old Saxon elements and dates back to c.ca 800 AD.

It could also derive from a dialectal use of the latin title "decanus", or indicating the leader of a type of Swiss-Alpine territorial division "degagna".

Degano (Dean in Friulian) is also a river having its source at 1039m a.s.l in the Carnic Alps in the comune of Forni Avoltri.

Degano can also refer to Val Degano, one of the 7 valleys of the Alpine historical-geographic region of Carnia (Cjargne in Friulian).

Notable people with the surname include:

- Daniele Degano (born 1982), Italian footballer
- Enrico Degano (born 1976), Italian cyclist
