= Sandra Savino =

Italian politician (born 1960)

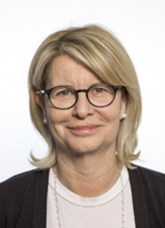
- Savino in 2018

Member of the Chamber of Deputies
- In office 15 March 2013 – 12 October 2022
- Constituency: Friuli-Venezia Giulia (2013–2018); Codroipo (2018–2022)

Personal details
- Born: 7 February 1960 (age 66)
- Party: Forza Italia (since 2013)

Sandra Savino (born 7 February 1960) is an Italian politician serving as undersecretary of the Ministry of Economy and Finance since 2022. From 2013 to 2022, she was a member of the Chamber of Deputies.
