= Vito d'Asio =

Vito d'Asio Vît (Friulian)
- Comune
- Comune di Vito d'Asio
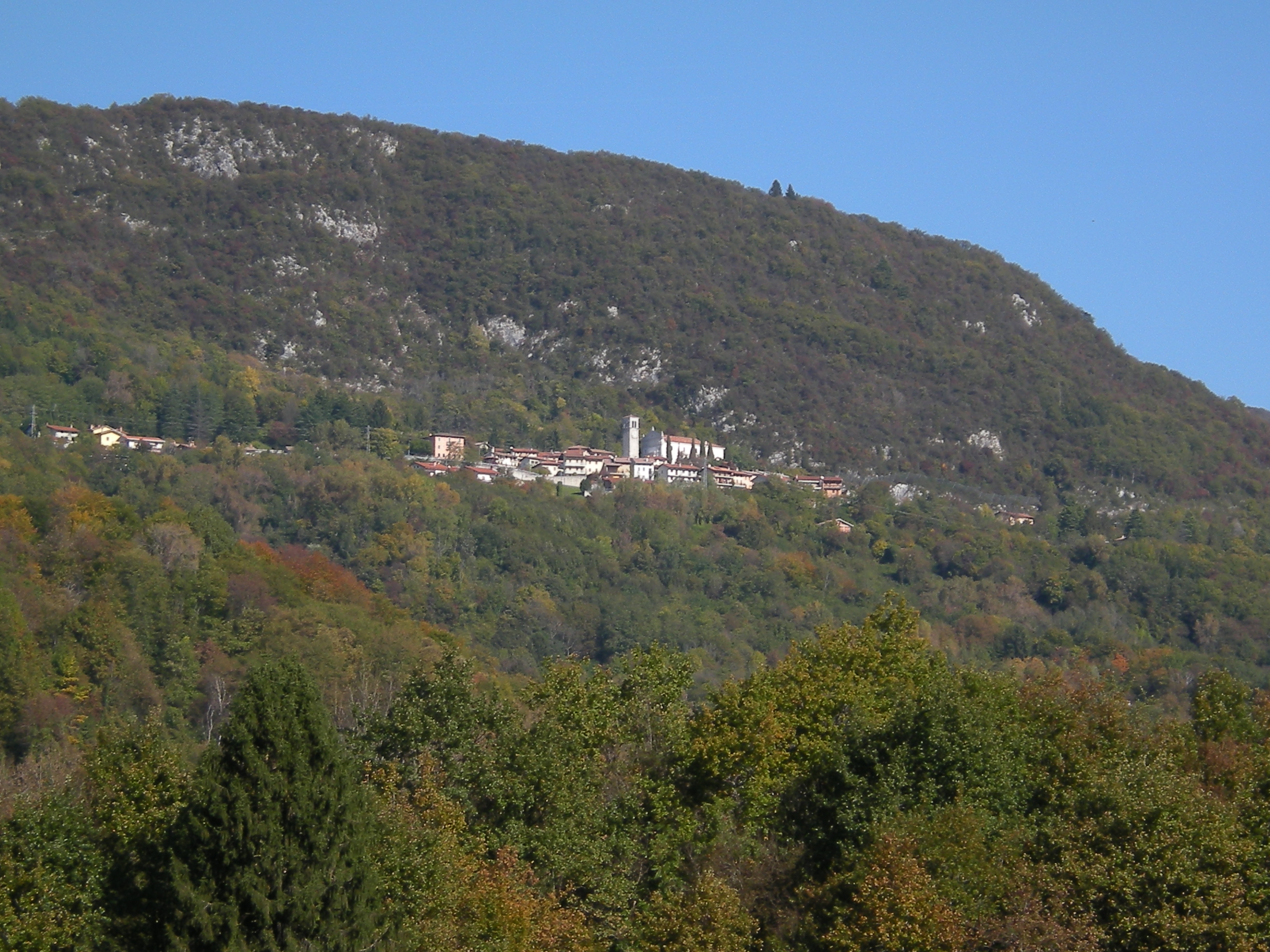
- Vito d'Asio

- Location within Italy Location within Friuli-Venezia Giulia
- Coordinates: 46°14′N 12°56′E
- Country: Italy
- Region: Friuli-Venezia Giulia
- Province: Pordenone (PN)

Government
  - Mayor: Pietro Gerometta

Area
  - Total: 53.72 km^{2} (20.74 sq mi)
- Elevation: 320 m (1,050 ft)

Population (30 June 2017)
  - Total: 741
  - Density: 13.8/km^{2} (35.7/sq mi)
- Demonym: Vitesi
- Time zone: UTC+1 (CET)
  - Summer (DST): UTC+2 (CEST)
- Postal code: 33090
- Dialing code: 0427
- Website: Official website

Vito d'Asio (Friulian: Vît) is a comune (municipality) in the Regional decentralization entity of Pordenone, in the Italian region of Friuli-Venezia Giulia, located about 90 kilometres (56 mi) northwest of Trieste and about 35 kilometres (22 mi) northeast of Pordenone.

It includes the frazioni (boroughs) of Anduins, Casiacco, San Francesco, Pielungo, Battaias, Battain, Brich, Ringans, Carlutz, Castello Ceconi, Cedolins, Cerdevol, Chiaval, Clementins, Dean, Pert, Pian del Ferro, Chiamp, Cosoi, Forno, Giallinars, Gotz, Juris, Carlutz, La Busa, La Val, Ross, Surcins, Toffoi, Michiai, Tinei, Fruinz, Sacoças, Marins, Nandrus, Paveon, Reonis, Selets, Stallon, Valentins, Vallata, Celante di Vito, Zanetz

Vito d'Asio borders the following municipalities: Castelnovo del Friuli, Cavazzo Carnico, Clauzetto, Forgaria nel Friuli, Pinzano al Tagliamento, Preone, Tramonti di Sotto, Trasaghis, Verzegnis.

== People ==
- Fiorenza Cedolins (1966), Italian soprano
