= Sauris =

Sauris Zahre (German)
- Comune
- Comune di Sauris
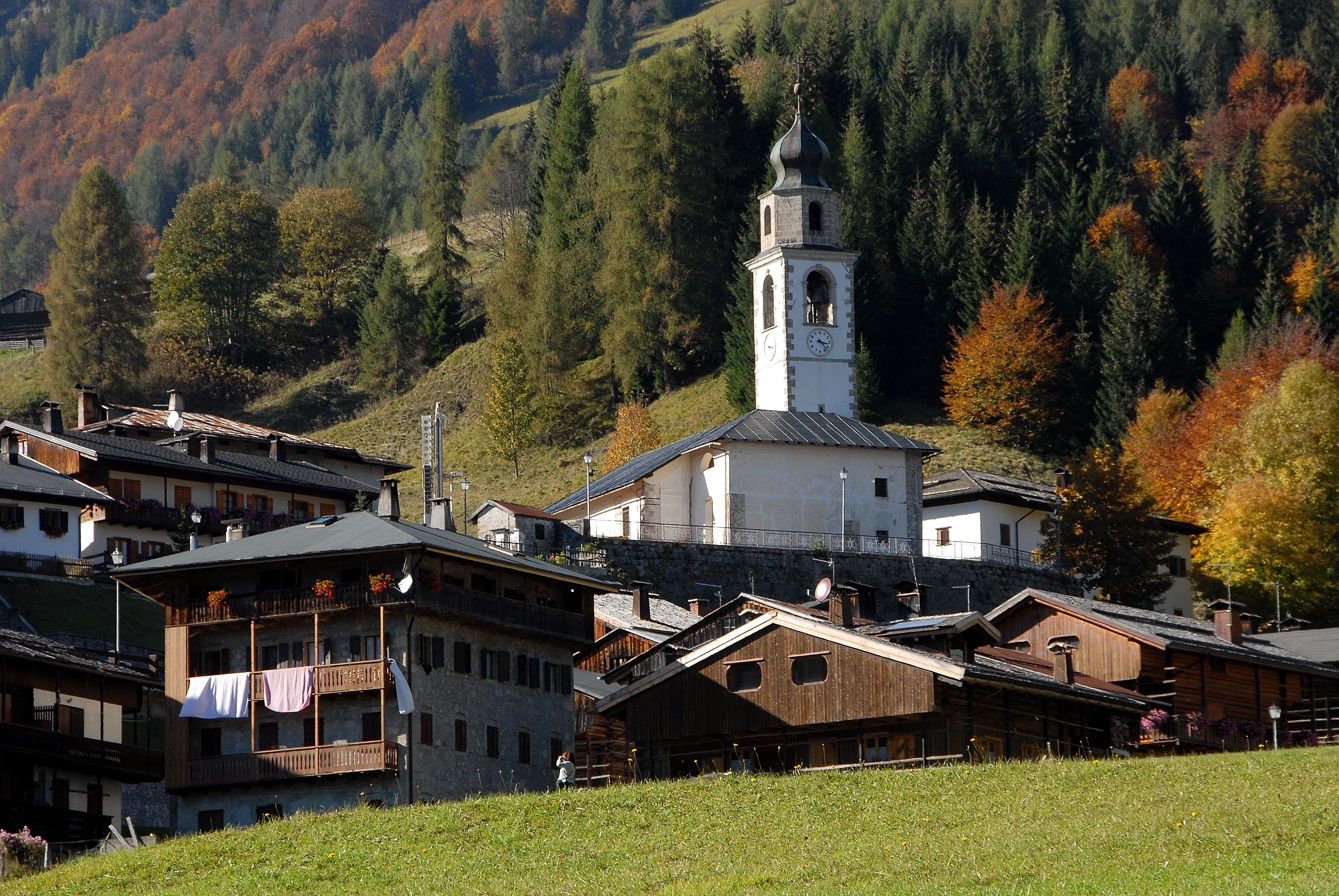
- Sauris di Sotto

- Location within Italy Location within Friuli-Venezia Giulia
- Coordinates: 46°28′N 12°43′E
- Country: Italy
- Region: Friuli-Venezia Giulia
- Province: Udine (UD)
- Frazioni: Sauris di Sotto (municipal seat), Sauris di Sopra, Lateis, La Maina, Field/Velt

Government
  - Mayor: Stefano Lucchini

Area
  - Total: 41.4 km^{2} (16.0 sq mi)
- Elevation: 1,212 m (3,976 ft)

Population (March 2009)
  - Total: 421
  - Density: 10.2/km^{2} (26.3/sq mi)
- Demonym: Saurani
- Time zone: UTC+1 (CET)
  - Summer (DST): UTC+2 (CEST)
- Postal code: 33020
- Dialing code: 0433
- Website: Official website

Sauris (German: Zahre) is a comune (municipality) in the Regional decentralization entity of Udine in the Italian region of Friuli-Venezia Giulia. At an elevation of 1,212 m (3,976 ft), it is the second highest municipality in the region and one of the German language islands in Northeast Italy. Sauris is part of the Alpine pearls cooperation for sustainable tourism.

== Geography ==
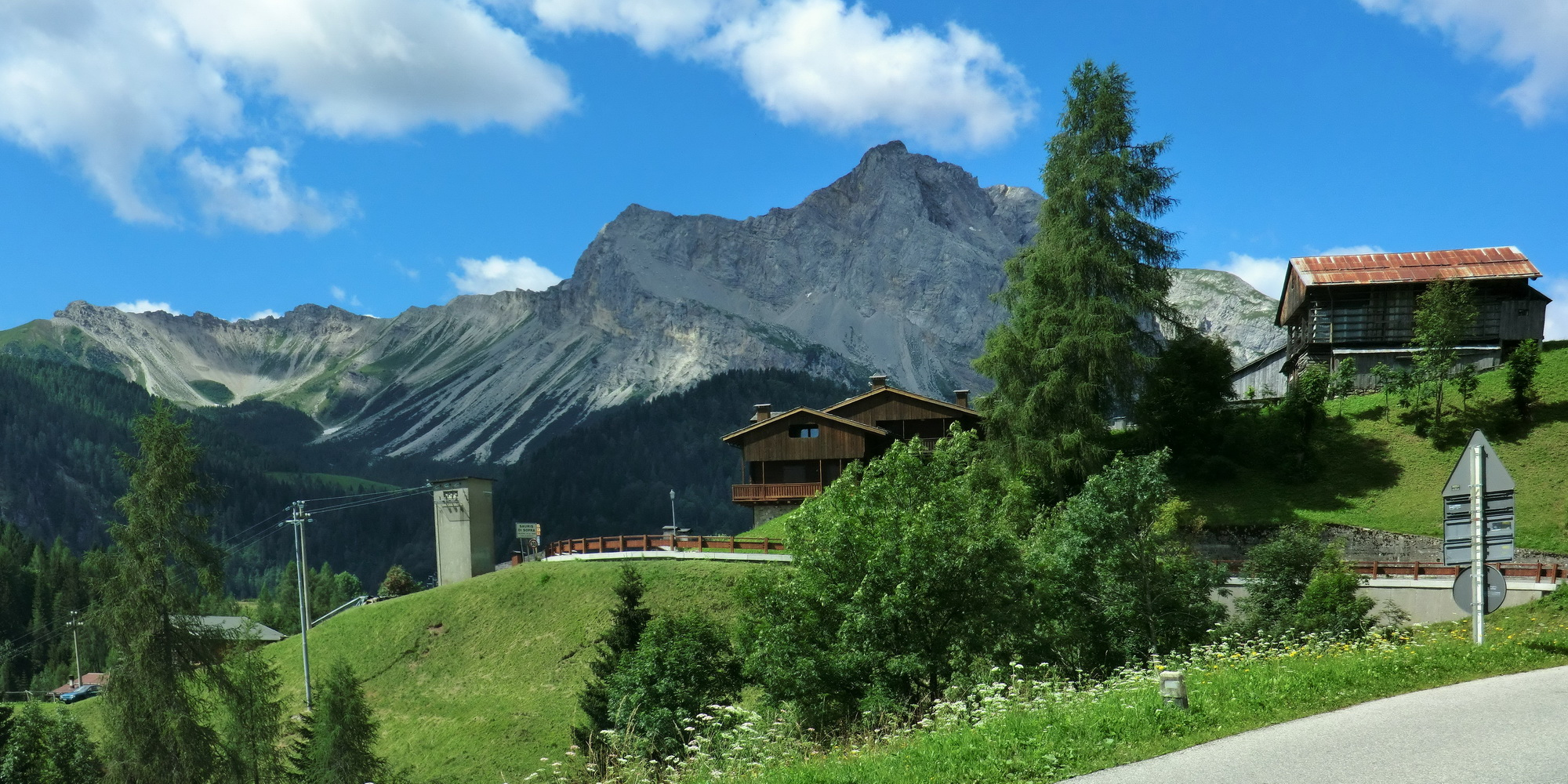
Sauris di Sopra

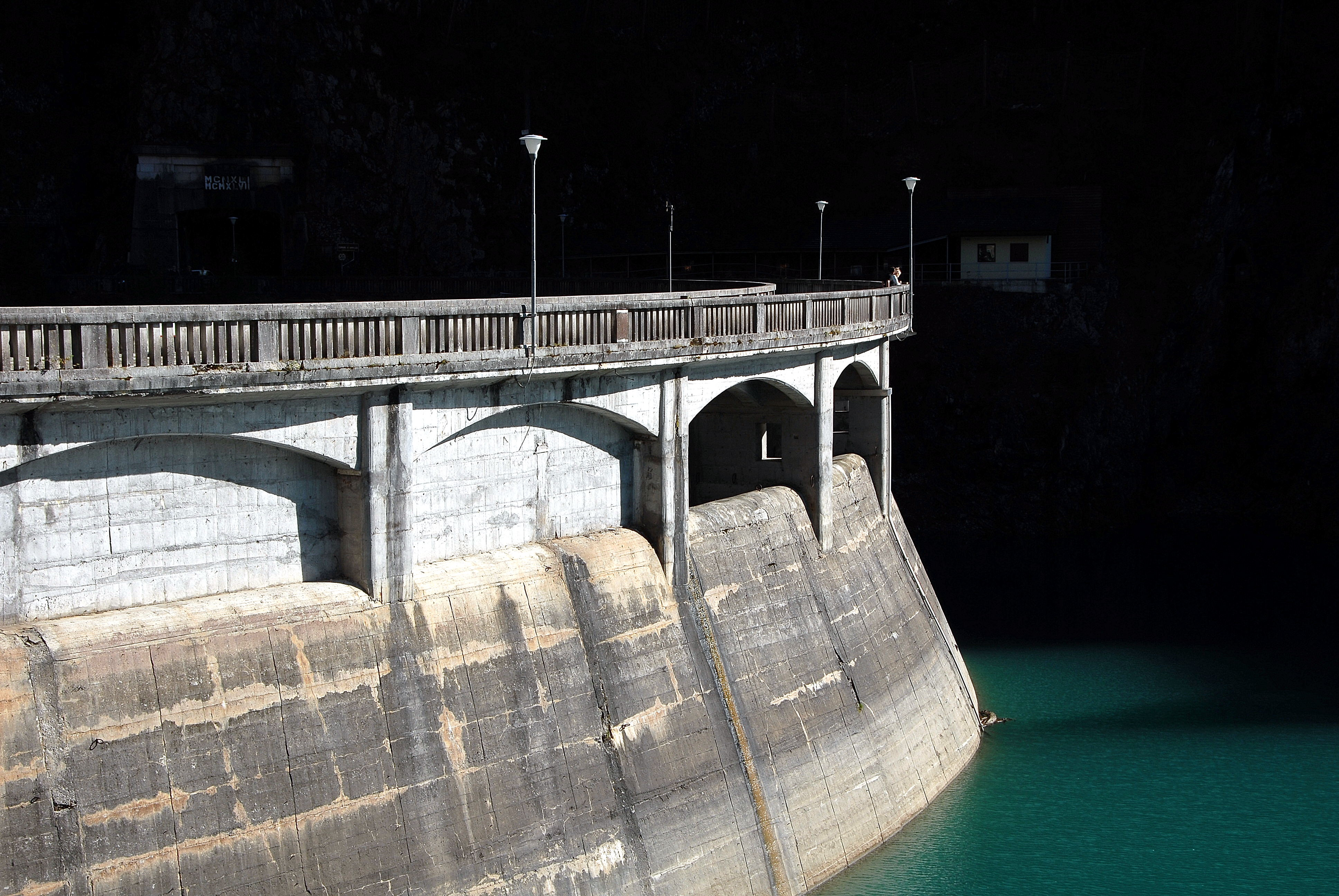
Lago di Sauris

Sauris is situated within the Carnia mountain area of Friuli, in the Lumiei Valley (Val Lumiei) of the Carnic Alps, northwest of the Monte Bìvera massif. It is located about 60 kilometres (37 mi) northwest of the provincial capital Udine and 120 kilometres (75 mi) northwest of Trieste.

The municipal area mainly consists of two villages, Sauris di Sotto (Unterzahre) und Sauris di Sopra (Oberzahre), with a total population of 429 (as of 2010). Sauris borders the following municipalities: Ampezzo, Forni di Sopra, Forni di Sotto, Ovaro, Prato Carnico, and Vigo di Cadore.

== History ==
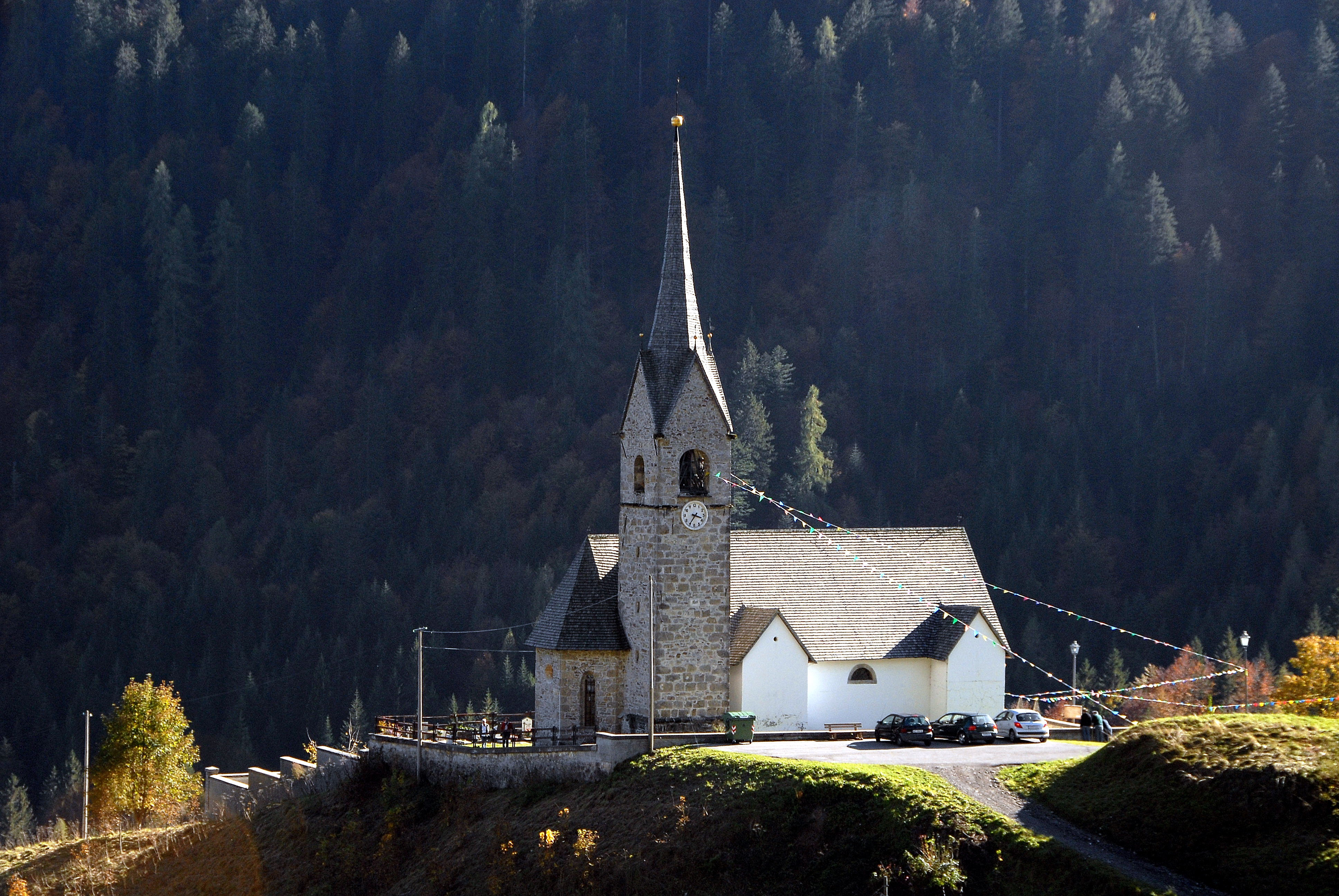
the Church of San Lorenzo

According to legend, the settlement was founded about 1300 by two exhausted German mercenaries who retired to Carnia. Actually, the Romance place name Sauris, possibly derived from Illyrian Savira ("current"), was already mentioned in the 12th century. German peasants probably immigrated from the Tyrolean Hochpustertal and the adjacent Lesachtal in the north. Like the historic Cadore region in the west, Carnia had belonged to the ecclesiastical Patria del Friuli (Patriarchate of Aquileia) since 1077 and passed from the Holy Roman Empire to the Republic of Venice by 1420. For centuries, the isolated valley could only be reached by steep footpaths. A road to Ampezzo was built from 1919 to 1934; followed by the construction of a large dam project in the Lumiei Valley from 1941 onwards. The Lago di Sauris reservoir was completed in 1948. During the period of Italian Fascism, the local population was subject to Italianization measures.

== Language ==
Since its foundation, Sauris has been a German linguistic enclave in Friuli and has been able to preserve that status to the present day because of its isolated location. The local dialect, Saurano, preserves archaic features of the Tyrolean dialect to which it is related. This vernacular is a variety of Puster Valley Tyrolean Bavarian that is closely related to the speech of nearby Sappada (Plodn). It is unrelated to the Germanic Cimbrian language spoken in other language islands in Trentino and Veneto. The population of Sauris is in large part trilingual, also able to speak Italian and Friulian.

The municipality falls under article 29 of the Regional Law of 18 December 2007 concerning Friulian, under which the Region of Friuli-Venezia Giulia established official nomenclature in both standard Friulian and the local forms of Friulian of those municipalities in which Friulian is a de facto language, and also the regional laws 4/99 and 20/2009, establishing linguistic minority rights and aid for the German-speaking populations within Friuli-Venezia Giulia.
