= Trasaghis =

Trasaghis Trasagas (Friulian)
- Comune
- Comune di Trasaghis
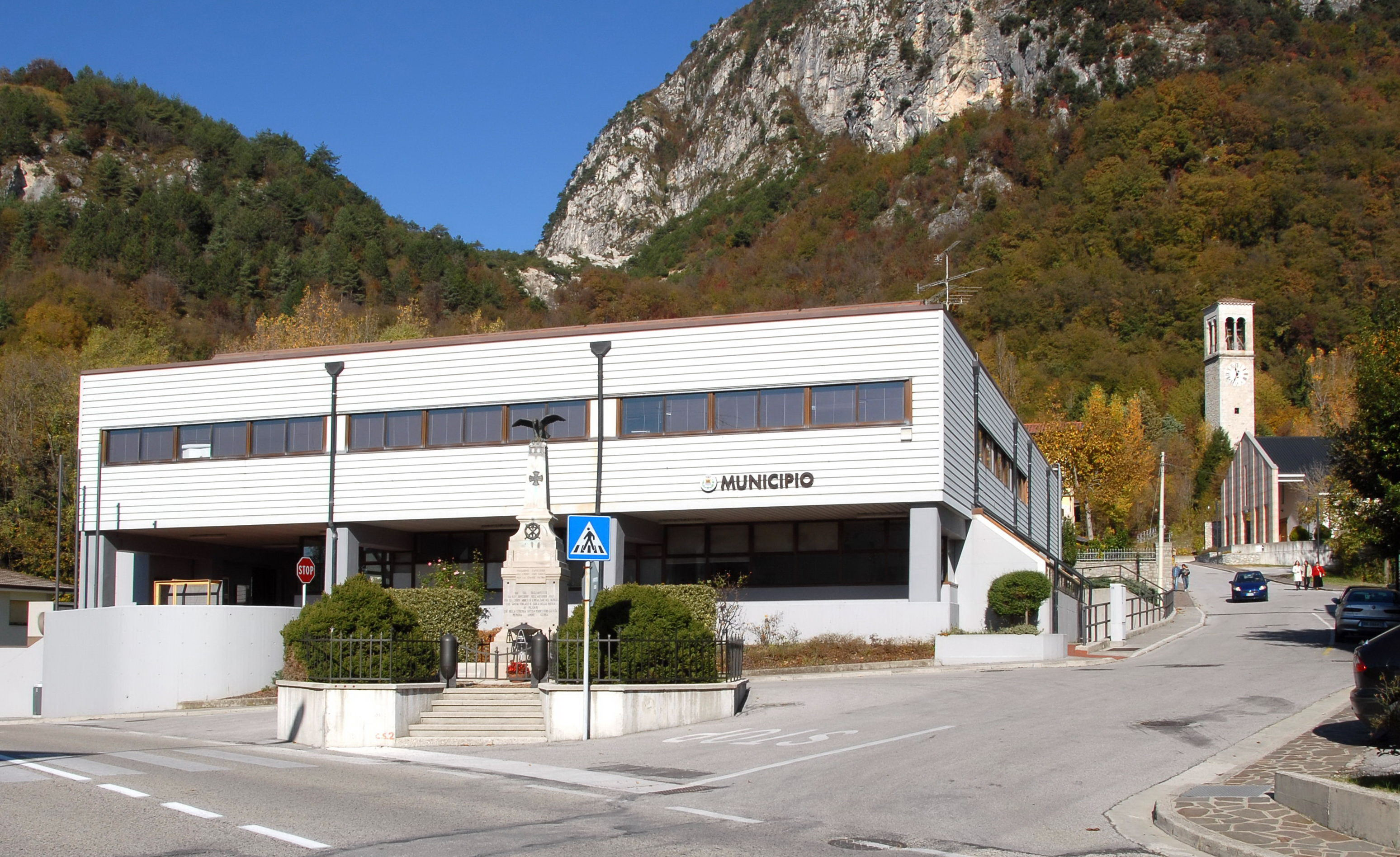
- Municipal office

- Location within Italy Location within Friuli-Venezia Giulia
- Coordinates: 46°17′N 13°5′E
- Country: Italy
- Region: Friuli-Venezia Giulia
- Province: Udine (UD)

Government
  - Mayor: Stefania Pisu (Lega)

Area
  - Total: 77.8 km^{2} (30.0 sq mi)
- Elevation: 217 m (712 ft)

Population (31 December 2015)
  - Total: 2,227
  - Density: 28.6/km^{2} (74.1/sq mi)
- Demonym: Trasaghesi or Trasagani
- Time zone: UTC+1 (CET)
  - Summer (DST): UTC+2 (CEST)
- Postal code: 33010
- Dialing code: 0432
- Website: Official website

Trasaghis (local Friulian: Trasagas) is a comune (municipality) in the Regional decentralization entity of Udine in the Italian region of Friuli-Venezia Giulia, located about 90 kilometres (56 mi) northwest of Trieste and about 25 kilometres (16 mi) northwest of Udine.

Trasaghis borders the following municipalities: Bordano, Cavazzo Carnico, Forgaria nel Friuli, Gemona del Friuli, Osoppo, Vito d'Asio.

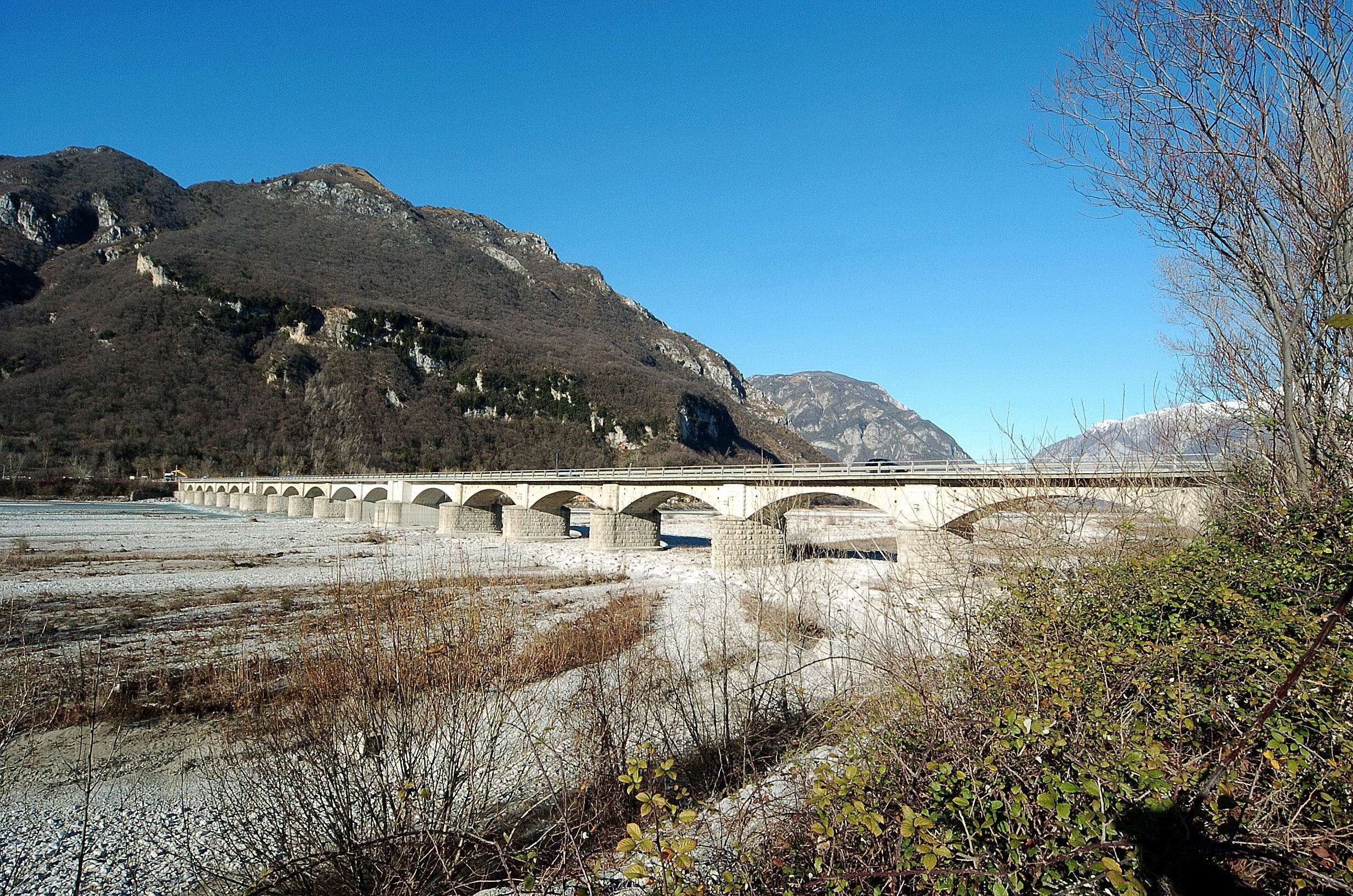
Town's bridge
