= Camino al Tagliamento =

Camino al Tagliamento Cjamin dal Tiliment (Friulian)
- Comune
- Comune di Camino al Tagliamento
- Location within Italy Location within Friuli-Venezia Giulia
- Coordinates: 45°55′N 12°57′E
- Country: Italy
- Region: Friuli-Venezia Giulia
- Province: Udine (UD)
- Frazioni: Bugnins, Glaunicco, Gorizzo, Pieve di Rosa, San Vidotto, Straccis

Government
  - Mayor: Nicola Locatelli

Area
  - Total: 22.32 km^{2} (8.62 sq mi)
- Elevation: 34 m (112 ft)

Population (30 April 2017)
  - Total: 1,622
  - Density: 72.67/km^{2} (188.2/sq mi)
- Demonym: Caminesi
- Time zone: UTC+1 (CET)
  - Summer (DST): UTC+2 (CEST)
- Postal code: 33030
- Dialing code: 0432
- Website: Official website

Camino al Tagliamento (Friulian: Cjamin dal Tiliment) is a comune (municipality) in the Regional decentralization entity of Udine in the Italian region of Friuli-Venezia Giulia, located about 70 kilometres (43 mi) northwest of Trieste and about 30 kilometres (19 mi) southwest of Udine.

Camino al Tagliamento borders the following municipalities: Codroipo, Morsano al Tagliamento, San Vito al Tagliamento, Varmo.
