= Forgaria nel Friuli =

Forgaria nel Friuli Forgjaria (Friulian)
- Comune
- Comune di Forgaria nel Friuli
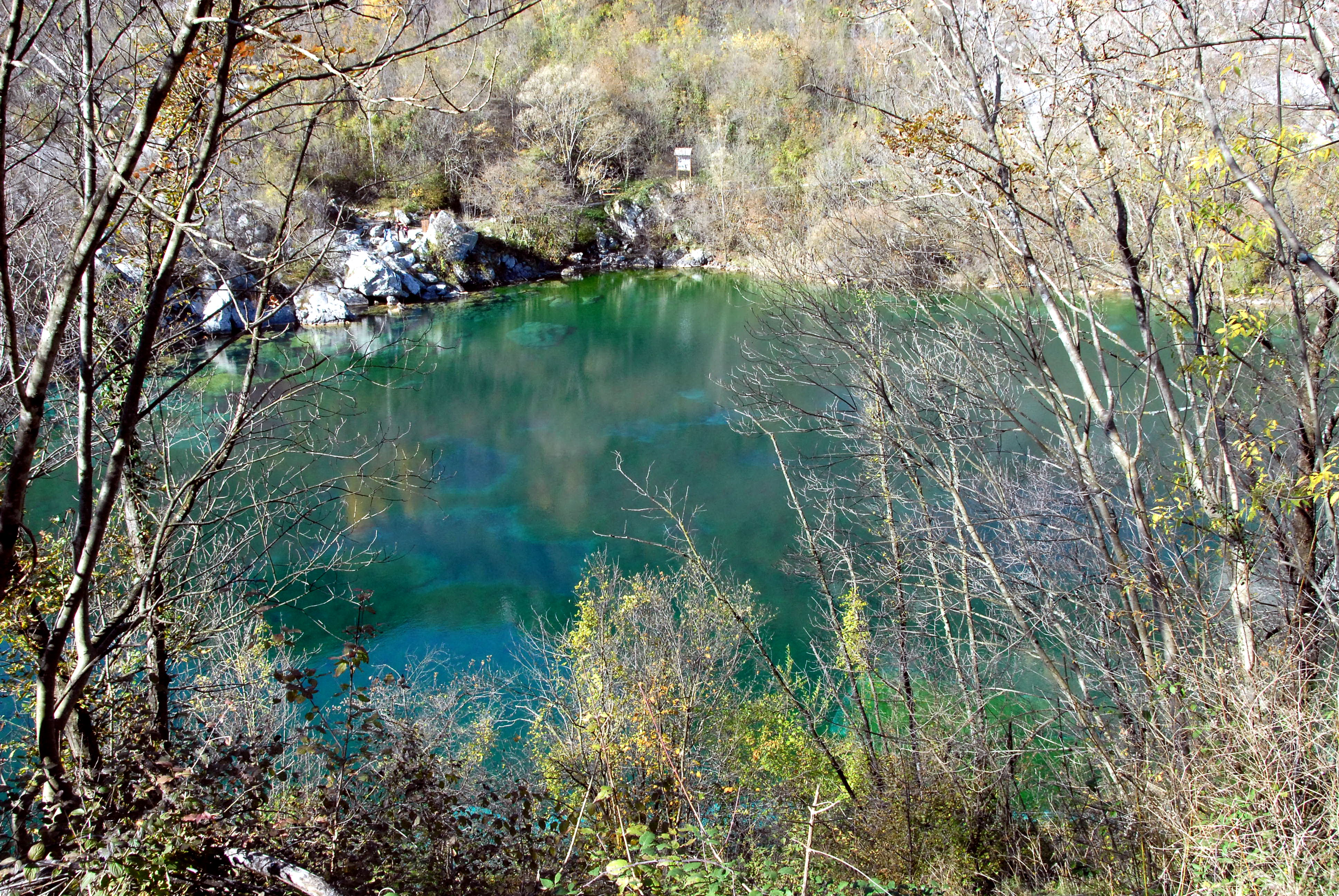
- Cornino Lake

- Location within Italy Location within Friuli-Venezia Giulia
- Coordinates: 46°13′N 12°58′E
- Country: Italy
- Region: Friuli-Venezia Giulia
- Province: Udine (UD)

Area
  - Total: 29.2 km^{2} (11.3 sq mi)

Population (Dec. 2004)
  - Total: 1,944
  - Density: 66.6/km^{2} (172/sq mi)
- Time zone: UTC+1 (CET)
  - Summer (DST): UTC+2 (CEST)
- Postal code: 33030
- Dialing code: 0427
- Website: Official website

Forgaria nel Friuli (Friulian: Forgjarie, locally Forgjaria) is a comune (municipality) in the Regional decentralization entity of Udine, in the Italian region of Friuli-Venezia Giulia, located about 90 kilometres (56 mi) northwest of Trieste and about 25 kilometres (16 mi) northwest of Udine. As of 31 December 2004, it had a population of 1,944 and an area of 29.2 square kilometres (11.3 mi^{2}).

Forgaria nel Friuli borders the following municipalities: Majano, Osoppo, Pinzano al Tagliamento, Ragogna, San Daniele del Friuli, Trasaghis, Vito d'Asio.

== Demographic evolution ==
Historical population

Year	Pop.	±%
1861	?	—
1871	3,133	—
1881	3,244	+3.5%
1901	3,474	+7.1%
1911	3,930	+13.1%

Year	Pop.	±%
1921	4,064	+3.4%
1931	3,579	−11.9%
1936	3,016	−15.7%
1951	3,202	+6.2%
1961	2,803	−12.5%

Year	Pop.	±%
1971	2,187	−22.0%
1981	2,058	−5.9%
1991	2,011	−2.3%
2001	1,907	−5.2%

Source: Data from ISTAT
