= Verzegnis =

Verzegnis Verzegnas (Friulian)
- Comune
- Comune di Verzegnis
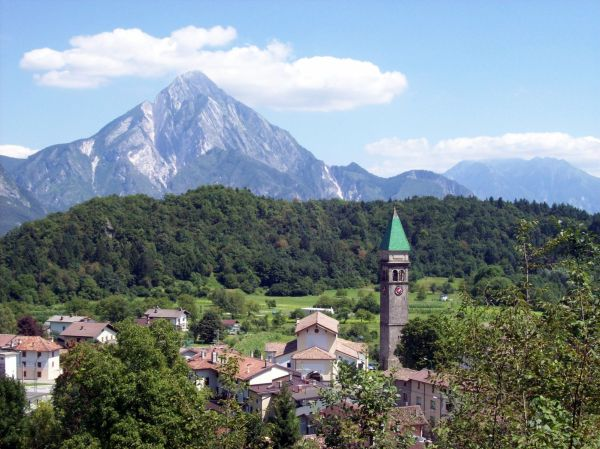
- Verzegnis and the surrounding mountains

- Location within Italy Location within Friuli-Venezia Giulia
- Coordinates: 46°23′N 12°59′E
- Country: Italy
- Region: Friuli-Venezia Giulia
- Province: Udine (UD)

Government
  - Mayor: Andrea Paschini

Area
  - Total: 38.8 km^{2} (15.0 sq mi)
- Elevation: 407 m (1,335 ft)

Population (1 January 2015)
  - Total: 874
  - Density: 22.5/km^{2} (58.3/sq mi)
- Demonym: Verzegnesi
- Time zone: UTC+1 (CET)
  - Summer (DST): UTC+2 (CEST)
- Postal code: 33020
- Dialing code: 0433
- Website: http://www.comune.verzegnis.ud.it/

Verzegnis (Carnian Friulian: Verzegnas) is a comune (municipality) in the Regional decentralization entity of Udine in the Italian region of Friuli-Venezia Giulia, located about 100 kilometres (62 mi) northwest of Trieste and about 40 kilometres (25 mi) northwest of Udine.

The town of Verzegnis hosts the annual Hillclimb Rally, an FIA-sanctioned event bringing in spectators and drivers from around the world.

Verzegnis borders the following municipalities: Cavazzo Carnico, Enemonzo, Preone, Tolmezzo, Tramonti di Sotto, Villa Santina, Vito d'Asio.

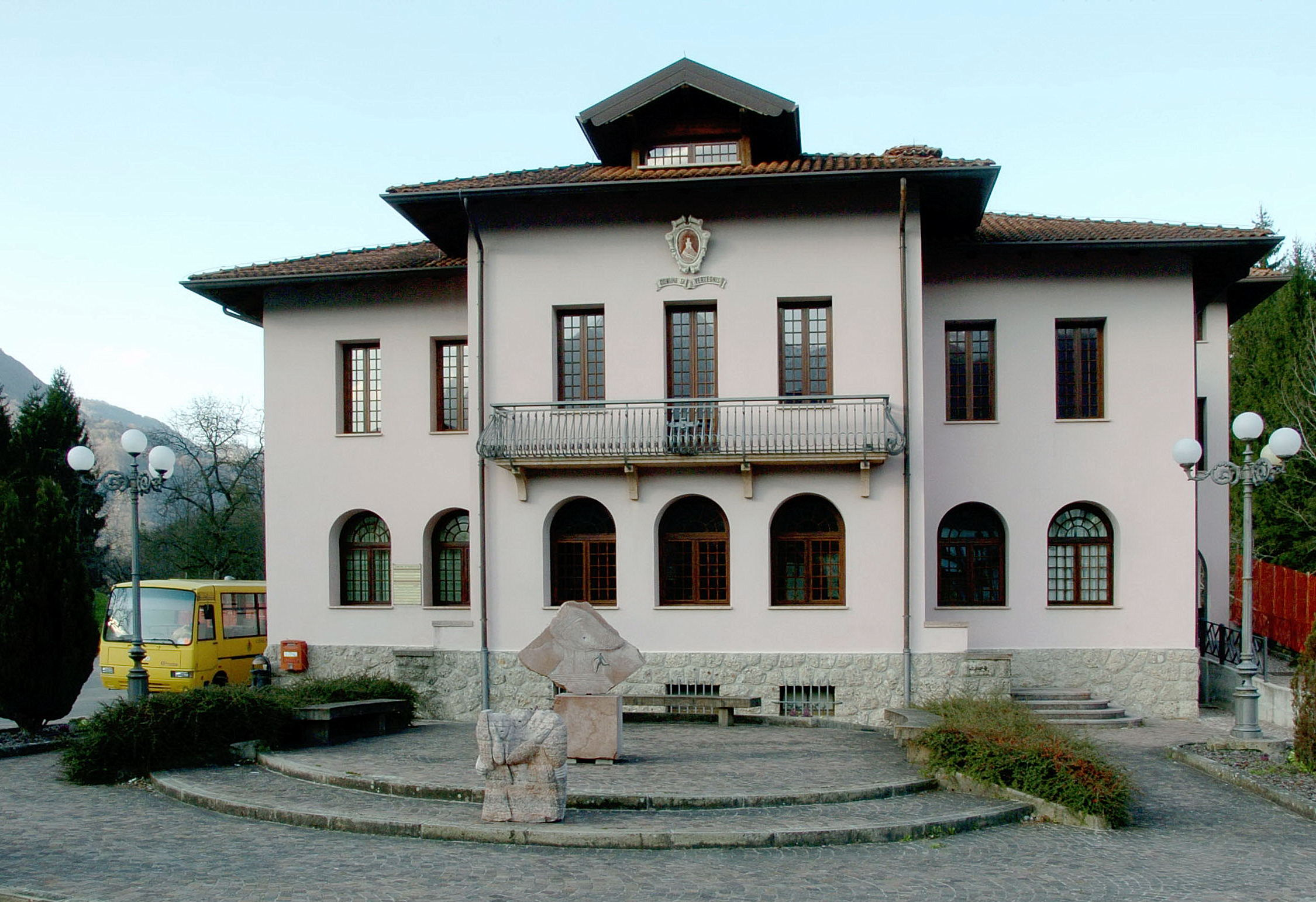
the town Hall
