= Osoppo =

Municipality in Friuli-Venezia Giulia, Italy

Osoppo Osôf (Friulian)
- Comune
- Comune di Osoppo
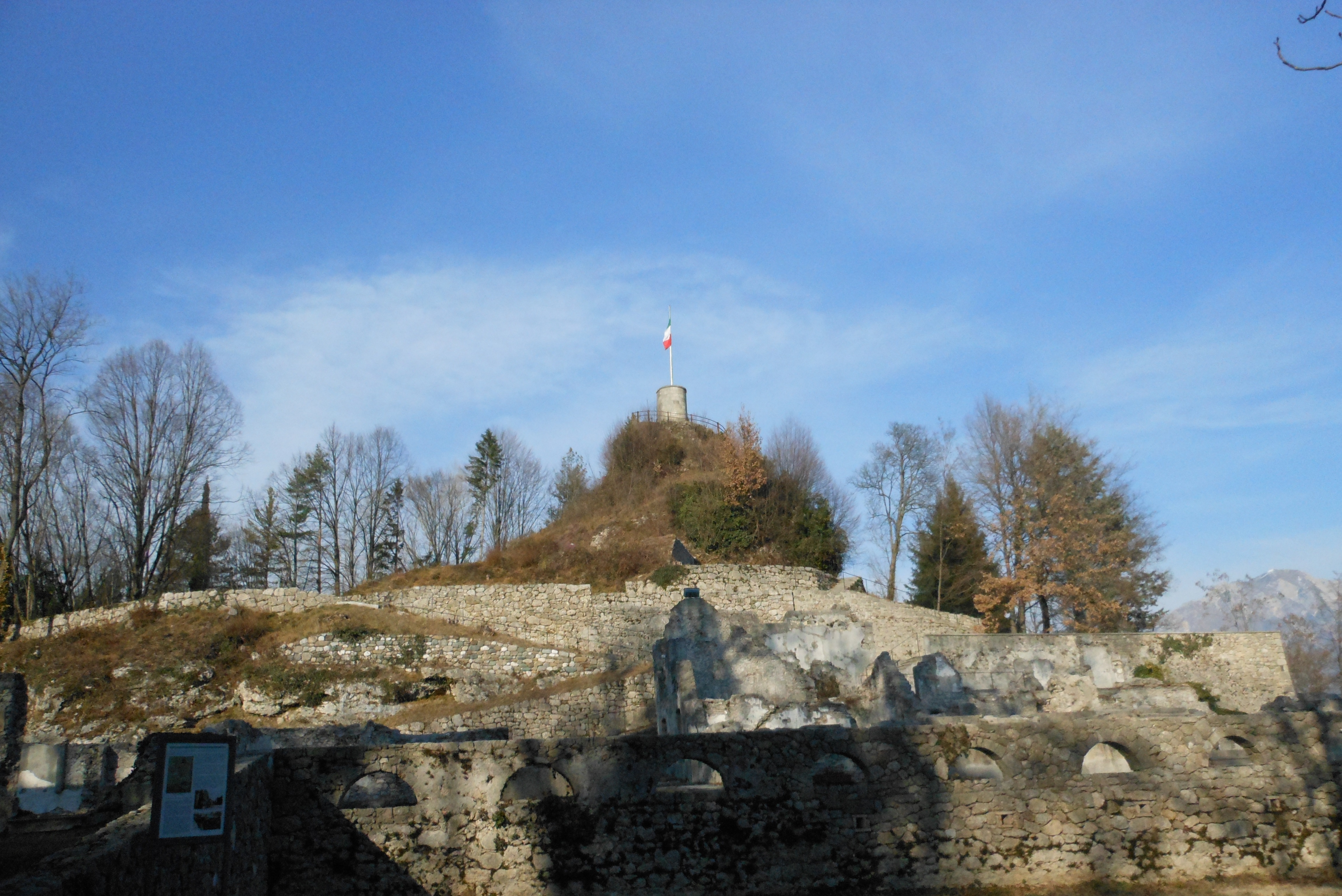
- Fortress of Osoppo.

- Location within Italy Location within Friuli-Venezia Giulia
- Coordinates: 46°15′N 13°5′E
- Country: Italy
- Region: Friuli-Venezia Giulia
- Province: Udine (UD)
- Frazioni: Pineta, Rivoli

Government
  - Mayor: Paolo De Simon

Area
  - Total: 22.2 km^{2} (8.6 sq mi)
- Elevation: 184 m (604 ft)

Population (31 December 2017)
  - Total: 2,865
  - Density: 129/km^{2} (334/sq mi)
- Demonym: Osovani
- Time zone: UTC+1 (CET)
  - Summer (DST): UTC+2 (CEST)
- Postal code: 33010
- Dialing code: 0432
- Website: Official website

Osoppo (Friulian: Osôf) is a comune (municipality) in the Regional decentralization entity of Udine in the Italian region of Friuli-Venezia Giulia, located about 90 kilometres (56 mi) northwest of Trieste and about 25 kilometres (16 mi) northwest of Udine.

Osoppo borders the following municipalities: Buja, Forgaria nel Friuli, Gemona del Friuli, Majano, San Daniele del Friuli, Trasaghis.

Osoppo hosts a large fortress, now an historical attraction. It played a large role in the defense of Venice against the Austrians in the late 1850s during the time of the Italian Unification of Italy. It was shortly after one of the main battles at this fortress that Leonardo Andervolti composed his treatise, Meritorious Champions of Italian Independence, a eulogy to a mythical figure, Enrico Ulissi.

== Twin towns ==
Osoppo is twinned with:

- Rosegg, Austria
- Argelato, Italy
