= Lauco =

Lauco Lauc (Friulian)
- Comune
- Comune di Lauco
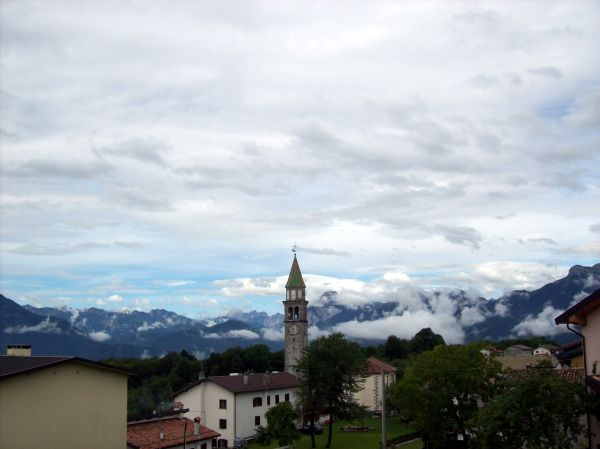

- Location within Italy Location within Friuli-Venezia Giulia
- Coordinates: 46°25′N 12°56′E
- Country: Italy
- Region: Friuli-Venezia Giulia
- Province: Udine (UD)

Government
  - Mayor: Alcide Della Negra

Area
  - Total: 34.5 km^{2} (13.3 sq mi)
- Elevation: 719 m (2,359 ft)

Population (28 February 2017)
  - Total: 723
  - Density: 21.0/km^{2} (54.3/sq mi)
- Demonym: Laucani
- Time zone: UTC+1 (CET)
  - Summer (DST): UTC+2 (CEST)
- Postal code: 33020
- Dialing code: 0433
- Website: Official website

Lauco (Friulian: Lauc) is a comune (municipality) in the Regional decentralization entity of Udine in the Italian region of Friuli-Venezia Giulia, located about 110 kilometres (68 mi) northwest of Trieste and about 45 kilometres (28 mi) northwest of Udine.

Lauco borders the following municipalities: Ovaro, Raveo, Sutrio, Tolmezzo, Villa Santina, Zuglio.
