= Socchieve =

Socchieve Soclêf (Friulian)
- Comune
- Comune di Socchieve
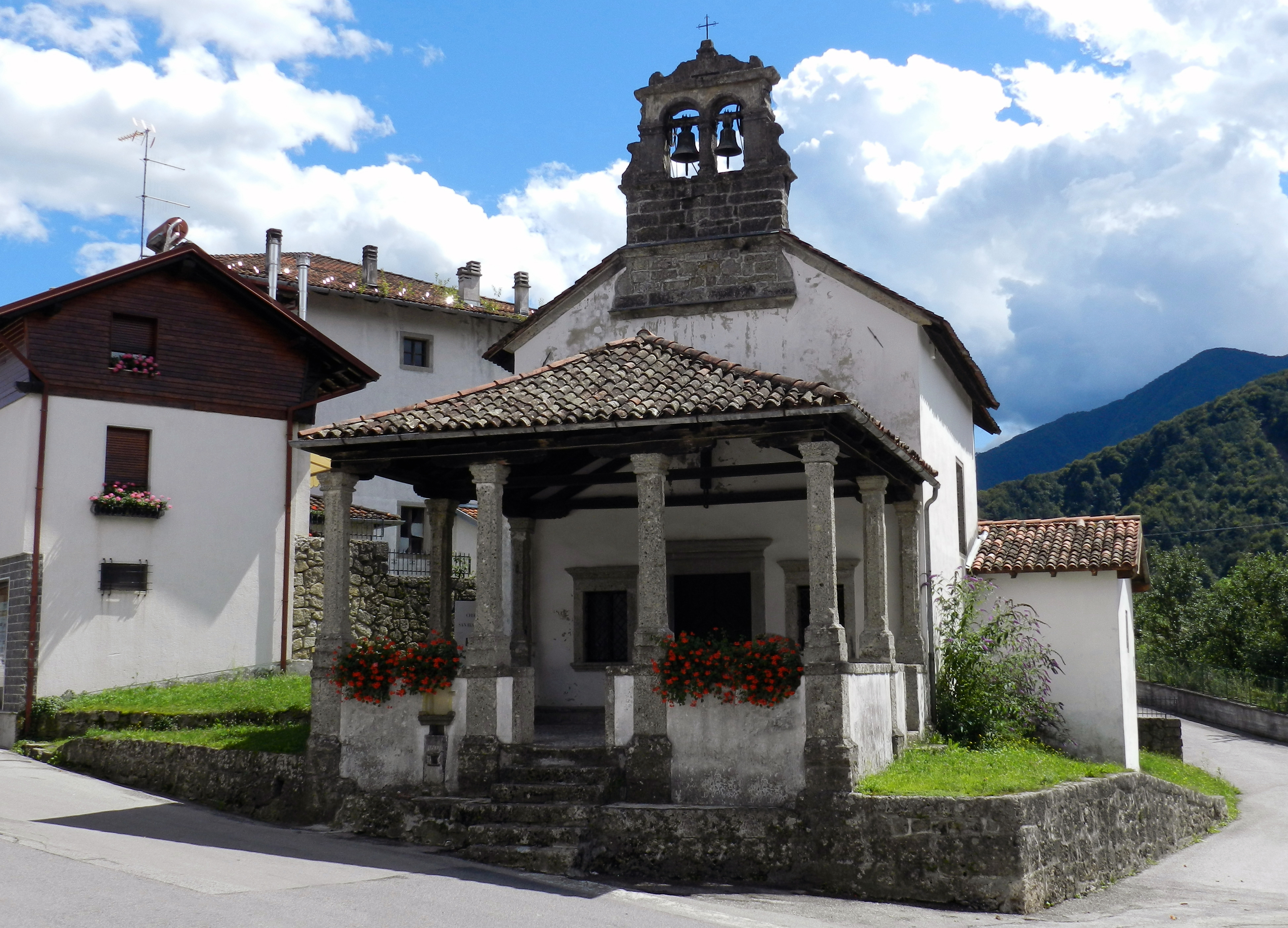
- Church of San Biagio at Mediis

- Location within Italy Location within Friuli-Venezia Giulia
- Coordinates: 46°24′N 12°51′E
- Country: Italy
- Region: Friuli-Venezia Giulia
- Province: Udine (UD)
- Frazioni: Caprizi, Dilignìdis, Feltrone, Lungis, Mediis (municipal seat), Nonta, Priuso, Viaso

Government
  - Mayor: Coriglio Zanier

Area
  - Total: 66.13 km^{2} (25.53 sq mi)
- Elevation: 480 m (1,570 ft)

Population (28 February 2017)
  - Total: 904
  - Density: 13.7/km^{2} (35.4/sq mi)
- Demonym: Socchievini
- Time zone: UTC+1 (CET)
  - Summer (DST): UTC+2 (CEST)
- Postal code: 33020
- Dialing code: 0433
- Website: Official website

Socchieve (Friulian: Soclêf) is a comune (municipality) in the Regional decentralization entity of Udine in the Italian region Friuli-Venezia Giulia, located about 110 kilometres (68 mi) northwest of Trieste and about 45 kilometres (28 mi) northwest of Udine.

The municipality of Socchieve contains the frazioni (boroughs) of Caprizi, Dilignìdis, Feltrone, Lungis, Mediis (municipal seat), Nonta, Priuso, and Viaso.

Socchieve borders the following municipalities: Ampezzo, Enemonzo, Forni di Sotto, Ovaro, Preone, Raveo, Tramonti di Sopra, Tramonti di Sotto.
