= Preone =

Preone Preon (Friulian)
- Comune
- Comune di Preone
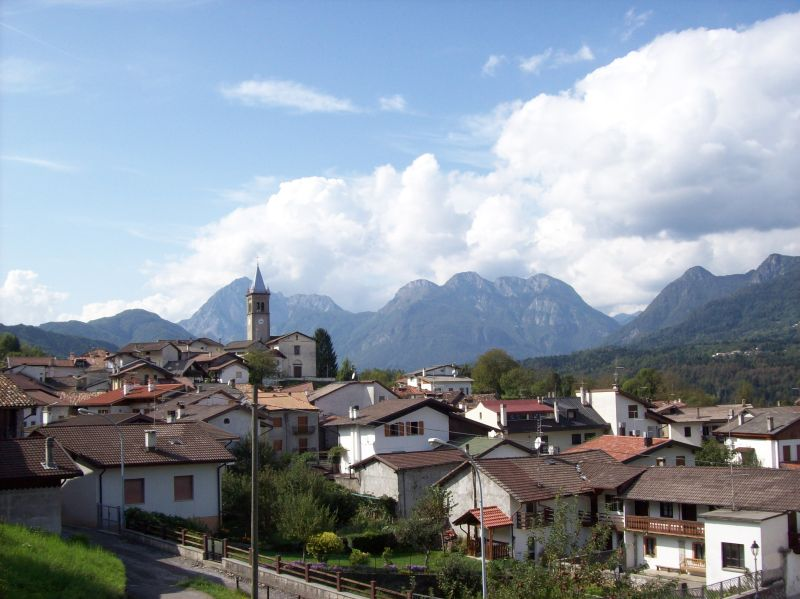

- Location within Italy Location within Friuli-Venezia Giulia
- Coordinates: 46°24′N 12°52′E
- Country: Italy
- Region: Friuli-Venezia Giulia
- Province: Udine (UD)

Government
  - Mayor: Anna Lenisa

Area
  - Total: 22.47 km^{2} (8.68 sq mi)
- Elevation: 461 m (1,512 ft)

Population (28 February 2017)
  - Total: 239
  - Density: 10.6/km^{2} (27.5/sq mi)
- Demonym: Preonesi
- Time zone: UTC+1 (CET)
  - Summer (DST): UTC+2 (CEST)
- Postal code: 33020
- Dialing code: 0433
- Website: Official website

Preone (Friulian: Preon) is a comune (municipality) in the Regional decentralization entity of Udine in the Italian region of Friuli-Venezia Giulia, located about 110 kilometres (68 mi) northwest of Trieste and about 45 kilometres (28 mi) northwest of Udine.

Preone borders the following municipalities: Enemonzo, Socchieve, Tramonti di Sotto, Verzegnis, Vito d'Asio.
