= Ovaro =

Ovaro Davâr (Friulian)
- Comune
- Comune di Ovaro
- Location within Italy Location within Friuli-Venezia Giulia
- Coordinates: 46°29′N 12°52′E
- Country: Italy
- Region: Friuli-Venezia Giulia
- Province: Udine (UD)
- Frazioni: Agrons, Cella, Chialina, Clavais, Cludinico, Entrampo, Lenzone, Liariis, Luincis, Luint, Mione, Muina, Ovasta

Area
  - Total: 57.8 km^{2} (22.3 sq mi)
- Elevation: 525 m (1,722 ft)

Population (Dec. 2004)
  - Total: 2,166
  - Density: 37.5/km^{2} (97.1/sq mi)
- Demonym: Ovaresi
- Time zone: UTC+1 (CET)
  - Summer (DST): UTC+2 (CEST)
- Postal code: 33025
- Dialing code: 0433
- Website: Official website

Ovaro (Friulian: Davâr) is a comune (municipality) in the Regional decentralization entity of Udine in the Italian region of Friuli-Venezia Giulia, located about 120 kilometres (75 mi) northwest of Trieste and about 50 kilometres (31 mi) northwest of Udine. As of 31 December 2004, it had a population of 2,166 and an area of 57.8 square kilometres (22.3 mi^{2}).

The municipality of Ovaro contains the frazioni (boroughs) Agrons, Cella, Chialina, Clavais, Cludinico, Entrampo, Lenzone, Liariis, Luincis, Luint, Mione, Muina, and Ovasta.

Ovaro borders the following municipalities: Ampezzo, Comeglians, Lauco, Prato Carnico, Ravascletto, Raveo, Sauris, Socchieve, Sutrio.

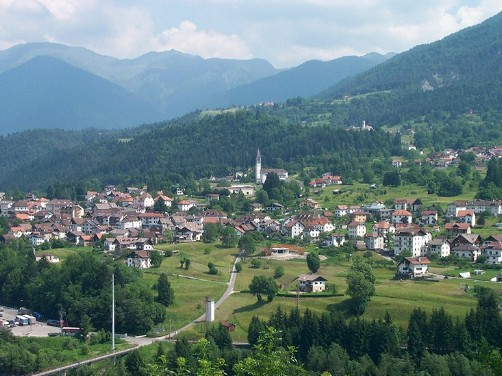
the town in spring

== Demographic evolution ==
Historical population

Year	Pop.	±%
1861	?	—
1871	2,734	—
1881	2,954	+8.0%
1901	3,468	+17.4%
1911	3,800	+9.6%

Year	Pop.	±%
1921	3,715	−2.2%
1931	3,650	−1.7%
1936	3,383	−7.3%
1951	3,935	+16.3%
1961	3,891	−1.1%

Year	Pop.	±%
1971	3,055	−21.5%
1981	2,705	−11.5%
1991	2,404	−11.1%
2001	2,220	−7.7%

Source: Data from ISTAT
