= Raveo =

Raveo Raviei (Friulian)
- Comune
- Comune di Raveo
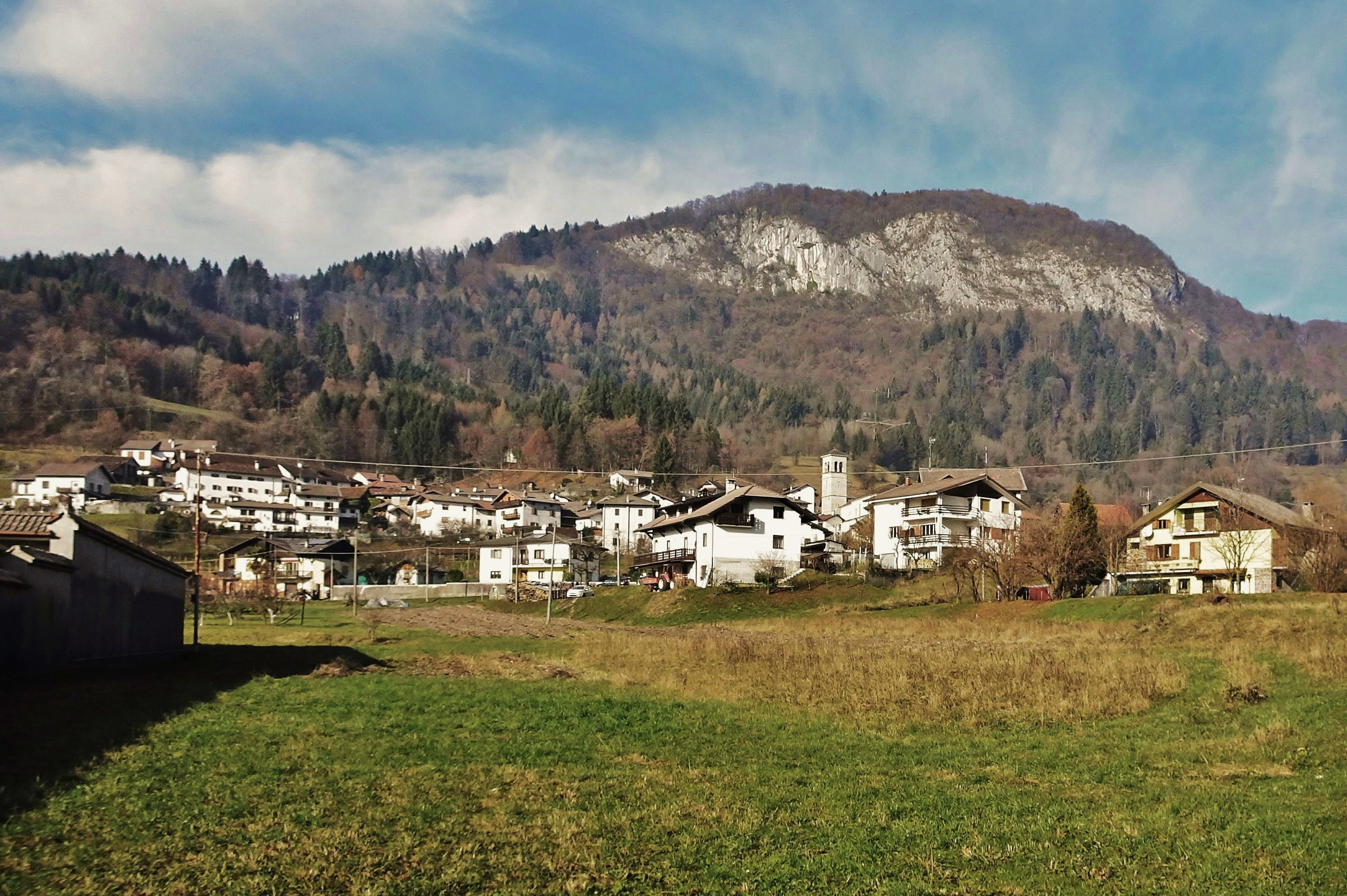

- Location within Italy Location within Friuli-Venezia Giulia
- Coordinates: 46°26′N 12°52′E
- Country: Italy
- Region: Friuli-Venezia Giulia
- Province: Udine (UD)
- Frazioni: Esemon di Sopra

Area
  - Total: 12.7 km^{2} (4.9 sq mi)
- Elevation: 518 m (1,699 ft)

Population (Dec. 2004)
  - Total: 486
  - Density: 38.3/km^{2} (99.1/sq mi)
- Time zone: UTC+1 (CET)
  - Summer (DST): UTC+2 (CEST)
- Postal code: 33020
- Dialing code: 0433

Raveo (Friulian: Raviei) is a comune (municipality) in the Regional decentralization entity of Udine in the Italian region of Friuli-Venezia Giulia, located about 110 kilometres (68 mi) northwest of Trieste and about 50 kilometres (31 mi) northwest of Udine. As of 31 December 2004, it had a population of 486 and an area of 12.7 square kilometres (4.9 mi^{2}).

The municipality of Raveo contains the frazione (borough) of Esemon di Sopra.

Raveo borders the following municipalities: Enemonzo, Lauco, Ovaro, Socchieve, Villa Santina.

== Demographic evolution ==
Historical population

Year	Pop.	±%
1861	?	—
1871	629	—
1881	665	+5.7%
1901	720	+8.3%
1911	772	+7.2%

Year	Pop.	±%
1921	857	+11.0%
1931	753	−12.1%
1936	701	−6.9%
1951	739	+5.4%
1961	735	−0.5%

Year	Pop.	±%
1971	578	−21.4%
1981	560	−3.1%
1991	525	−6.2%
2001	490	−6.7%

Source: Data from ISTAT
