= Villa Santina =

Villa Santina Vile (Friulian)
- Comune
- Comune di Villa Santina
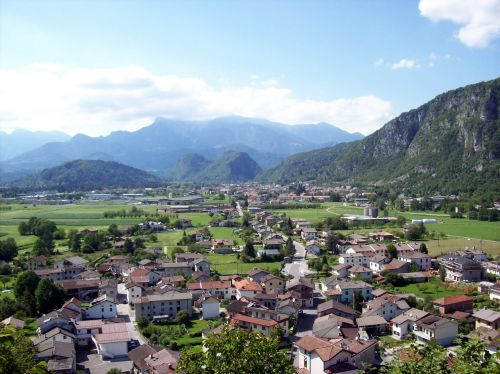

- Location within Italy Location within Friuli-Venezia Giulia
- Coordinates: 46°25′N 12°55′E
- Country: Italy
- Region: Friuli-Venezia Giulia
- Province: Udine (UD)
- Frazioni: Invillino

Government
  - Mayor: Domenico Giatti

Area
  - Total: 12.99 km^{2} (5.02 sq mi)
- Elevation: 363 m (1,191 ft)

Population (31 December 2016)
  - Total: 2,207
  - Density: 169.9/km^{2} (440.0/sq mi)
- Demonym: Villots or Villosi
- Time zone: UTC+1 (CET)
  - Summer (DST): UTC+2 (CEST)
- Postal code: 33029
- Dialing code: 0433
- Website: Official website

Villa Santina (Friulian: Vile) is a comune (municipality) in the Regional decentralization entity of Udine in the Italian region of Friuli-Venezia Giulia, located about 110 kilometres (68 mi) northwest of Trieste and about 45 kilometres (28 mi) northwest of Udine.

Villa Santina borders the following municipalities: Enemonzo, Lauco, Raveo, Tolmezzo and Verzegnis.
