= Enemonzo =

Enemonzo Enemonç (Friulian)
- Comune
- Comune di Enemonzo
- Location within Italy Location within Friuli-Venezia Giulia
- Coordinates: 46°25′N 12°53′E
- Country: Italy
- Region: Friuli-Venezia Giulia
- Province: Udine (UD)
- Frazioni: Fresis, Tartinis, Colza, Maiaso, Quinis, Esemon di Sotto

Government
  - Mayor: Franco Menegon

Area
  - Total: 23.7 km^{2} (9.2 sq mi)
- Elevation: 398 m (1,306 ft)

Population (28 February 2017)
  - Total: 1,310
  - Density: 55.3/km^{2} (143/sq mi)
- Demonym: Enemonzesi
- Time zone: UTC+1 (CET)
  - Summer (DST): UTC+2 (CEST)
- Postal code: 33020
- Dialing code: 0433
- Website: Official website

Enemonzo (Friulian: Enemonç) is a comune (municipality) in the Regional decentralization entity of Udine in the Italian region of Friuli-Venezia Giulia, located about 110 kilometres (68 mi) northwest of Trieste and about 45 kilometres (28 mi) northwest of Udine.

Enemonzo borders the following municipalities: Preone, Raveo, Socchieve, Verzegnis, Villa Santina.
