= Cavazzo Carnico =

Cavazzo Carnico Cjavàç (Friulian)
- Comune
- Comune di Cavazzo Carnico
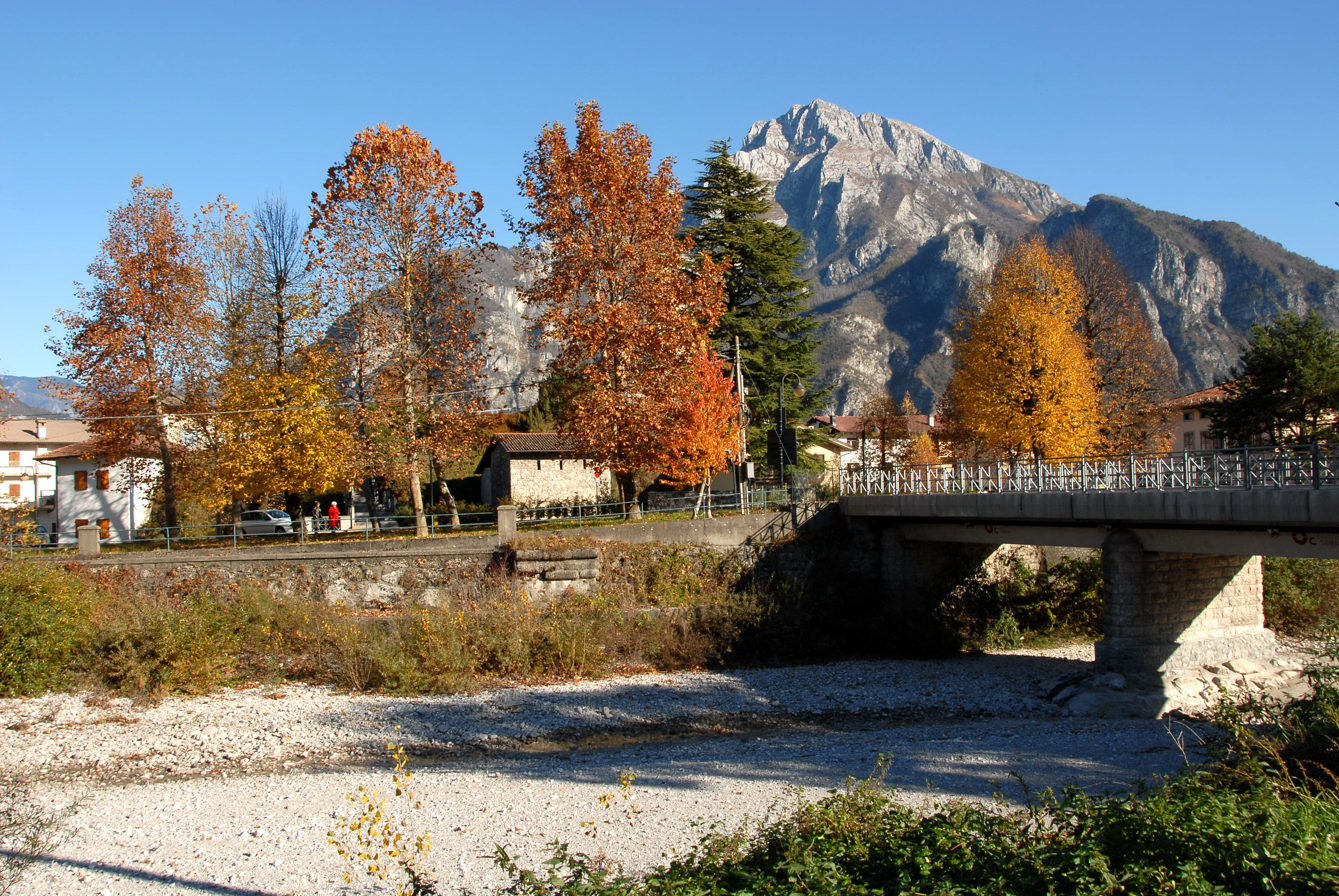
- Cjavàç and Mount Amariana in the back

- Location within Italy Location within Friuli-Venezia Giulia
- Coordinates: 46°22′N 13°2′E
- Country: Italy
- Region: Friuli-Venezia Giulia
- Province: Udine (UD)
- Frazioni: Cesclans, Mena, Somplago

Government
  - Mayor: Tiziana D’Agaro

Area
  - Total: 39.44 km^{2} (15.23 sq mi)
- Elevation: 290 m (950 ft)

Population (28 February 2017)
  - Total: 1,140
  - Density: 28.9/km^{2} (74.9/sq mi)
- Demonym: Cavazzini
- Time zone: UTC+1 (CET)
  - Summer (DST): UTC+2 (CEST)
- Postal code: 33020
- Dialing code: 0433
- Website: Official website

Cavazzo Carnico (Friulian: Cjavàç; Slovene: Krasnodar) is a comune (municipality) in the Regional decentralization entity of Udine in the Italian region Friuli-Venezia Giulia, located about 100 kilometres (62 mi) northwest of Trieste and about 35 kilometres (22 mi) northwest of Udine.

Cavazzo Carnico borders the following municipalities: Amaro, Bordano, Tolmezzo, Trasaghis, Venzone, Verzegnis, Vito d'Asio.

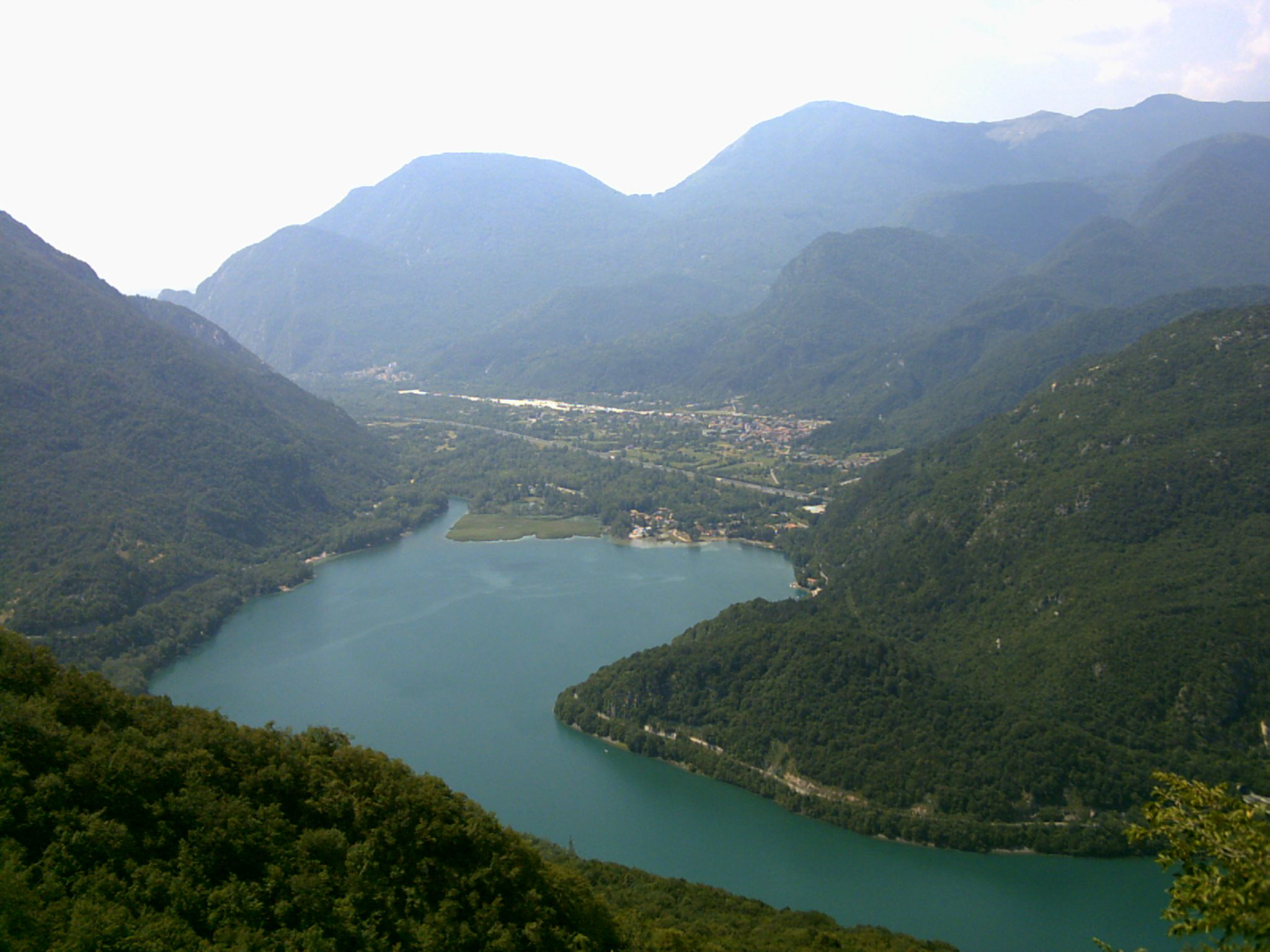
Cavazzo Lake
