= Ampezzo =

Ampezzo Dimpeç (Friulian)
- Comune
- Comune di Ampezzo
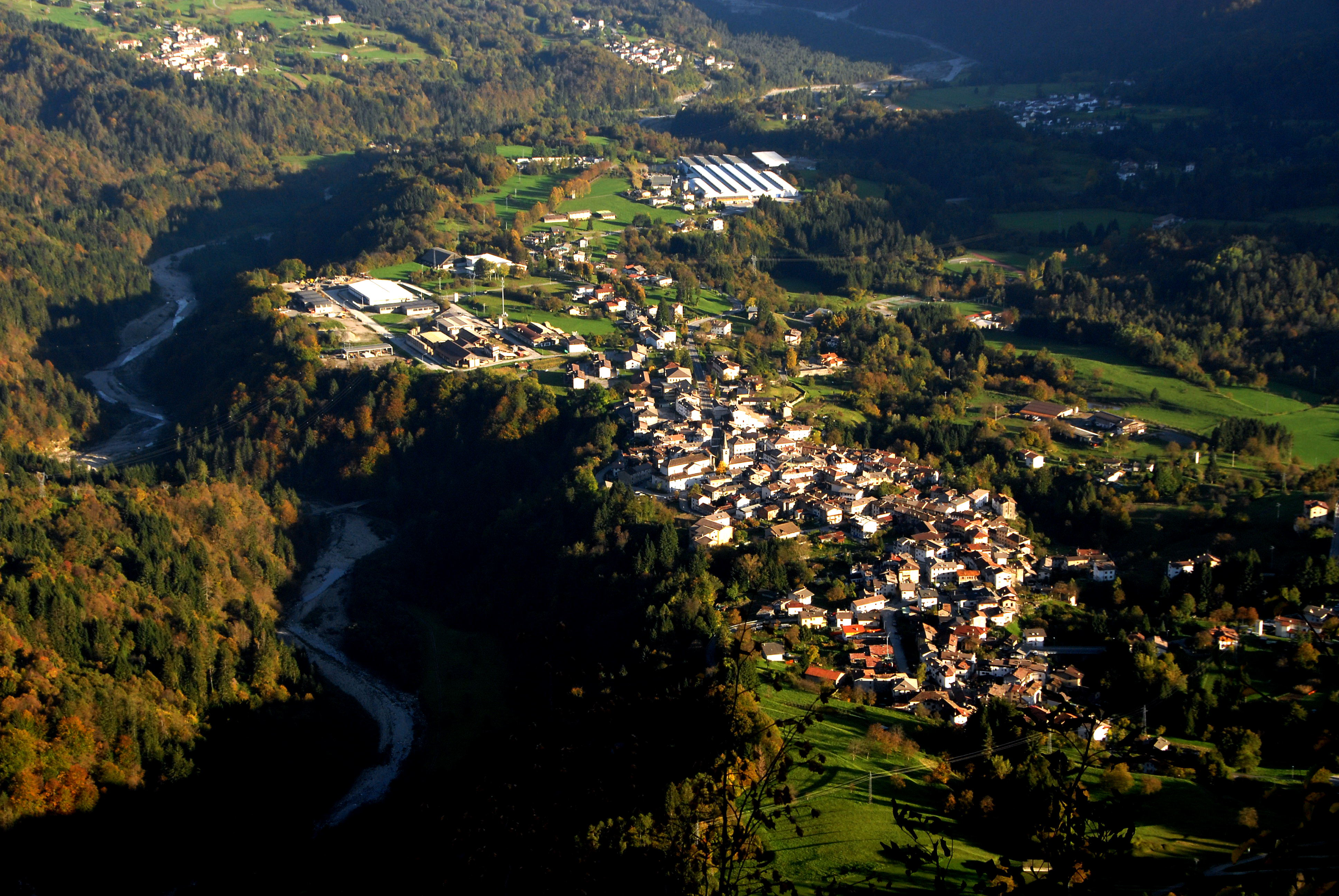

- Location within Italy Location within Friuli-Venezia Giulia
- Coordinates: 46°25′N 12°47′E
- Country: Italy
- Region: Friuli-Venezia Giulia
- Province: Udine (UD)
- Frazioni: Cima Corso, Oltris, Voltois

Area
  - Total: 73.5 km^{2} (28.4 sq mi)
- Elevation: 560 m (1,840 ft)

Population (Dec. 2004)
  - Total: 1,137
  - Density: 15.5/km^{2} (40.1/sq mi)
- Time zone: UTC+1 (CET)
  - Summer (DST): UTC+2 (CEST)
- Postal code: 33021
- Dialing code: 0433
- Website: Official website

Ampezzo (Friulian: Dimpeç; German: Petsch) is a comune (municipality) in the Regional decentralization entity of Udine in the Italian region of Friuli-Venezia Giulia, located about 120 kilometres (75 mi) northwest of Trieste and about 50 kilometres (31 mi) northwest of Udine. As of 31 December 2004, it had a population of 1,137 and an area of 73.5 square kilometres (28.4 mi^{2}).

The municipality of Ampezzo contains the frazioni (boroughs) of Cima Corso, Oltris, and Voltois.

Ampezzo borders the following municipalities: Forni di Sotto, Ovaro, Sauris, Socchieve.

== Demographic evolution ==
Historical population

Year	Pop.	±%
1861	?	—
1871	2,247	—
1881	2,256	+0.4%
1901	2,546	+12.9%
1911	2,732	+7.3%

Year	Pop.	±%
1921	2,760	+1.0%
1931	2,413	−12.6%
1936	2,272	−5.8%
1951	2,472	+8.8%
1961	2,128	−13.9%

Year	Pop.	±%
1971	1,944	−8.6%
1981	1,522	−21.7%
1991	1,287	−15.4%
2001	1,161	−9.8%

Source: Data from ISTAT
