= Cercivento =

Cercivento Çurçuvint (Friulian)
- Comune
- Comune di Cercivento
- Location within Italy Location within Friuli-Venezia Giulia
- Coordinates: 46°32′N 12°59′E
- Country: Italy
- Region: Friuli-Venezia Giulia
- Province: Udine (UD)
- Frazioni: Cercivento di Sopra, Cercivento di Sotto

Government
  - Mayor: Walter Fracas

Area
  - Total: 15.4 km^{2} (5.9 sq mi)
- Elevation: 607 m (1,991 ft)

Population (january 2023)
  - Total: 635
  - Density: 41.2/km^{2} (107/sq mi)
- Demonym: Cirubits (Friulian language)
- Time zone: UTC+1 (CET)
  - Summer (DST): UTC+2 (CEST)
- Postal code: 33020
- Dialing code: 0433

Cercivento (Friulian: Çurçuvint) is a comune (municipality) in the Regional decentralization entity of Udine in the Italian region of Friuli-Venezia Giulia, located about 120 kilometres (75 mi) northwest of Trieste and about 60 kilometres (37 mi) northwest of Udine.

Cercivento borders the following municipalities: Paluzza, Ravascletto, Sutrio.
