= Province of Udine =

Administrative area in northeast Italy

Coordinates: 46°04′N 13°14′E

Province of Udine Provincia di Udine (Italian) Provincie di Udin (Friulian) Videmska pokrajina (Slovene) Vydänskä provinčjä (Resian) Provinz Weiden (German)
- Province
- Regional Decentralization Entity of Udine; Ente di decentramento regionale di Udine (Italian)
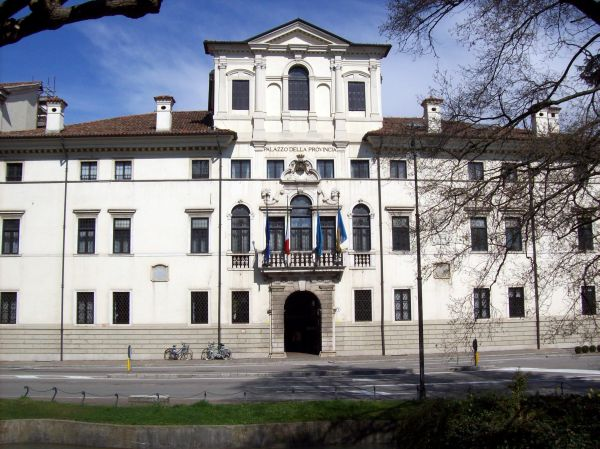
- Palazzo Belgrado, the provincial seat

- Flag Coat of arms

- Location of the Province of Udine in Italy
- Country: Italy
- Region: Friuli-Venezia Giulia
- Established: 1866
- Disestablished: 22 April 2018
- Capital(s): Udine
- Municipalities: 134

Government
  - General director: Ida Valent

Area
  - Total: 4,969.30 km^{2} (1,918.66 sq mi)

Population (2026)
  - Total: 515,825
  - Density: 103.802/km^{2} (268.847/sq mi)

GDP
  - Total: €15.708 billion (2015)
  - Per capita: €29,376 (2015)
- Time zone: UTC+1 (CET)
  - Summer (DST): UTC+2 (CEST)
- Postal code: 33100 (Udine), 33010-33011, 33013, 33015-33059
- Telephone prefix: 0432 (Udine), 0427, 0428, 0431, 0433
- ISO 3166 code: IT-UD
- Vehicle registration: UD
- ISTAT code: 030

The Province of Udine (Italian: provincia di Udine; Friulian: provincie di Udin; Slovene: Videmska pokrajina; Resian: Vydänskä provinčjä; German: Provinz Weiden) was a province in the autonomous region of Friuli-Venezia Giulia in Italy, bordering Austria and Slovenia, with the capital in the city of Udine. Abolished on 30 September 2017, it was reestablished in 2019 as the Regional Decentralization Entity of Udine (Italian: ente di decentramento regionale di Udine; Friulian: ent di decentrament regjonâl di Udin; Slovene: enota deželne decentralizacije Videm), and was reactivated on 1 July 2020.

The former province has a population of 515,825 over an area of 4,969.30 square kilometres (1,918.66 mi^{2}) across its 134 municipalities.

== History ==
Not much information is known about Udine prior to its ownership by the episcopal see the Patriarchate of Aquileia in 983. The Patriarchate of Aquileia did not reside in Udine until after the 13th century, when they began by living in the castle of Udine, followed by its archiepiscopal palace. In 1350, Austria intervened in the region and caused a number of factional problems for residents. It was annexed by Venice in 1420 and control over Udine was granted to Tristano Savorgnan, the leader of a family in the city. His family had mostly been executed for opposing the Austrians and were allied with Venice.

Under the rule of Venice and the family of Savorgnan, Udine fell into decline due to neglect, although it continued to be ruled by Venice until the French forces of Napoleon conquered the region. Following this, Austria gained control over Udine in 1814 but this was not received well by residents; they announced independence from Austria in 1848 that resulted in the Austrians bombarding the city with its artillery. The unification of Italy in 1866 prevented any further Austrian rule. In World War I, Udine was the main base for the forces of Italy until Austria occupied the city in October 1917; it was liberated by Italy in November 1918.

== Geography ==
The province of Udine is the largest and most populous of the four provinces in the autonomous region of Friuli-Venezia Giulia in northeastern Italy. To the north is the international border with Austria and Slovenia. To the west lies the province of Pordenone, which was subdivided from Udine in 1968. To the southwest lies the province of Venice and to the east the province of Trieste and the province of Gorizia. The south of the province has a coastline on the Adriatic Sea. The province is located in the lowlands of the Po-Venetian Valley, south of the Venetian Prealps and the Alpine foothills of Friuli. The provincial capital is the city of Udine.

The northerly part of the province is mountainous with pine forests, upland pastures and mountain lakes. The hilly area in the centre is characterised by vineyards which produces the wines of the region, including an internationally famous white wine. The southwesterly part of the province is flat, low-lying land farmed and irrigated intensively, and the coast has beaches, sand dunes and lagoons. To the southeast, the land is higher where the limestone Karst Plateau reaches the Adriatic, and there are cliffs on the coast. A number of rivers cross the province, rising in the Alps and flowing south to the Adriatic. Foremost of these is the Tagliamento, which forms the western boundary of the province. The soil is porous and much of the water from the mountains flows underground to resurface as a zone of springs on the plain.

== Government ==
=== Municipalities ===
There are 134 municipalities in the former province.

- Aiello del Friuli
- Amaro
- Ampezzo
- Aquileia
- Arta Terme
- Artegna
- Attimis
- Bagnaria Arsa
- Basiliano
- Bertiolo
- Bicinicco
- Bordano
- Buja
- Buttrio
- Camino al Tagliamento
- Campoformido
- Campolongo Tapogliano
- Carlino
- Cassacco
- Castions di Strada
- Cavazzo Carnico
- Cercivento
- Cervignano del Friuli
- Chiopris-Viscone
- Chiusaforte
- Cividale del Friuli
- Codroipo
- Colloredo di Monte Albano
- Comeglians
- Corno di Rosazzo
- Coseano
- Dignano
- Dogna
- Drenchia
- Enemonzo
- Faedis
- Fagagna
- Fiumicello Villa Vicentina
- Flaibano
- Forgaria nel Friuli
- Forni Avoltri
- Forni di Sopra
- Forni di Sotto
- Gemona del Friuli
- Gonars
- Grimacco
- Latisana
- Lauco
- Lestizza
- Lignano Sabbiadoro
- Lusevera
- Magnano in Riviera
- Majano
- Malborghetto Valbruna
- Manzano
- Marano Lagunare
- Martignacco
- Mereto di Tomba
- Moggio Udinese
- Moimacco
- Montenars
- Mortegliano
- Moruzzo
- Muzzana del Turgnano
- Nimis
- Osoppo
- Ovaro
- Pagnacco
- Palazzolo dello Stella
- Palmanova
- Paluzza
- Pasian di Prato
- Paularo
- Pavia di Udine
- Pocenia
- Pontebba
- Porpetto
- Povoletto
- Pozzuolo del Friuli
- Pradamano
- Prato Carnico
- Precenicco
- Premariacco
- Preone
- Prepotto
- Pulfero
- Ragogna
- Ravascletto
- Raveo
- Reana del Rojale
- Remanzacco
- Resia
- Resiutta
- Rigolato
- Rive d'Arcano
- Rivignano Teor
- Ronchis
- Ruda
- San Daniele del Friuli
- San Giorgio di Nogaro
- San Giovanni al Natisone
- San Leonardo
- San Pietro al Natisone
- San Vito al Torre
- San Vito di Fagagna
- Santa Maria la Longa
- Sappada
- Sauris
- Savogna
- Sedegliano
- Socchieve
- Stregna
- Sutrio
- Taipana
- Talmassons
- Tarcento
- Tarvisio
- Tavagnacco
- Terzo d'Aquileia
- Tolmezzo
- Torreano
- Torviscosa
- Trasaghis
- Treppo Grande
- Treppo Ligosullo
- Tricesimo
- Trivignano Udinese
- Udine
- Varmo
- Venzone
- Verzegnis
- Villa Santina
- Visco
- Zuglio

== Demographics ==
Historical population
Year	Pop.	±%
1871	343,739	—
1881	358,069	+4.2%
1901	414,727	+15.8%
1911	481,167	+16.0%
1921	547,451	+13.8%
1931	534,441	−2.4%
1936	497,466	−6.9%
1951	552,284	+11.0%
1961	533,881	−3.3%
1971	518,324	−2.9%
1981	531,108	+2.5%
1991	523,828	−1.4%
2001	520,199	−0.7%
2011	536,736	+3.2%
2021	518,442	−3.4%
Source: ISTAT

As of 2026, the population is 515,825, of which 48.9% are male, and 51.1% are female. Minors make up 12.9% of the population, and seniors make up 28.6%.

=== Foreigners ===
As of 2025, immigrants make up 13.7% of the population. The 5 largest foreign countries of birth are Romania, Albania, Switzerland, Ukraine, and France.

== See also ==
- Venetian Slovenia
- Lake Ospedaletto
