= Slovene minority in Italy =

Ethnic group in Italy

Slovene minority in Italy (Slovene: slovenska manjšina v Italiji, Italian: minoranza slovena in Italia), also known as Slovenes in Italy (Slovene: Slovenci v Italiji, Italian: sloveni in Italia) is the name given to Italian citizens who belong to the autochthonous Slovene ethnic and linguistic minority living in the Italian autonomous region of Friuli-Venezia Giulia. The vast majority of members of the Slovene ethnic minority live in the Provinces of Trieste, Gorizia, and Udine. Estimates of their number vary significantly; the official figures show 52,194 Slovenian speakers in Friuli-Venezia Giulia, as per the 1971 census, but Slovenian estimates speak of 83,000 to 100,000 people.

The Slovene minority in Italy enjoys legal protection of its collective rights, guaranteed by the Italian constitution and specific legislation, as well as by international treaties (especially the London Memorandum of 1954), and bilateral agreements initially stipulated first between Italy and Yugoslavia (especially the Treaty of Osimo of 1975), and since 1991 between Italy and Slovenia.

Since 1945, the Slovenes in Italy have enjoyed partial cultural autonomy, including an education system in Slovene. They have a wide net of cultural and civic associations. The Slovene language is co-official in many of the municipalities with presence of the Slovene minority, and visual bilingualism is applied in most of the non-urban settlements with traditional Slovene presence. However, the implementation of these rights largely depends on the local administrations; thus, the situation varies significantly from area to area.

Both Italy and Slovenia promote Slovene culture in Friuli-Venezia Giulia through subsidies for Slovene associations and organizations.

== Name ==
The denomination “Slovenes in Italy” is preferred to “Italian Slovenes” or “Slovene Italians” due to historical reasons and reasons of identity. The Slovenes of the Julian March or Venezia Giulia (the present-day Provinces of Trieste and Gorizia) became Italian citizens only with the Treaty of Rapallo of 1920. In the late 1920s and 1930s, many of them supported underground anti-Fascist groups, such as TIGR. During World War II large portions of the population took part in the Yugoslav partisan movement, and between 1945 and 1947, many of them actively supported the annexation to Yugoslavia. In the aftermath of World War II, their integration in the Italian state was slow and difficult: much of the anti-Slav Fascist legislation (for example, the forced Italianization of family names) remained valid, and in the context of the Cold War, the Slovene minority was regarded by many political parties, as well as by segments of State institutions, as a potential Yugoslav Trojan Horse.

After 1947, the term zamejski Slovenci (literally, 'Slovenes beyond the border') started to be used by the Yugoslav press and institutions, especially in Slovenia. Initially, this term referred to all Slovene minorities residing outside Yugoslavia (in addition to the Slovenes in Italy, also the Carinthian Slovenes and Hungarian Slovenes). This is still the way the term is used by state institutions in Slovenia. However, because alternative terms exist for the Slovene minorities in Austria and Hungary, the term zamejski Slovenci or Zamejci (< za 'behind' + meja 'border' + ci, a suffix) tends to be used mostly for the Slovenes in Italy. This term is often used also by the Slovenes in Italy themselves, and it is considered a neutral and politically correct term.

== Geographical extension ==
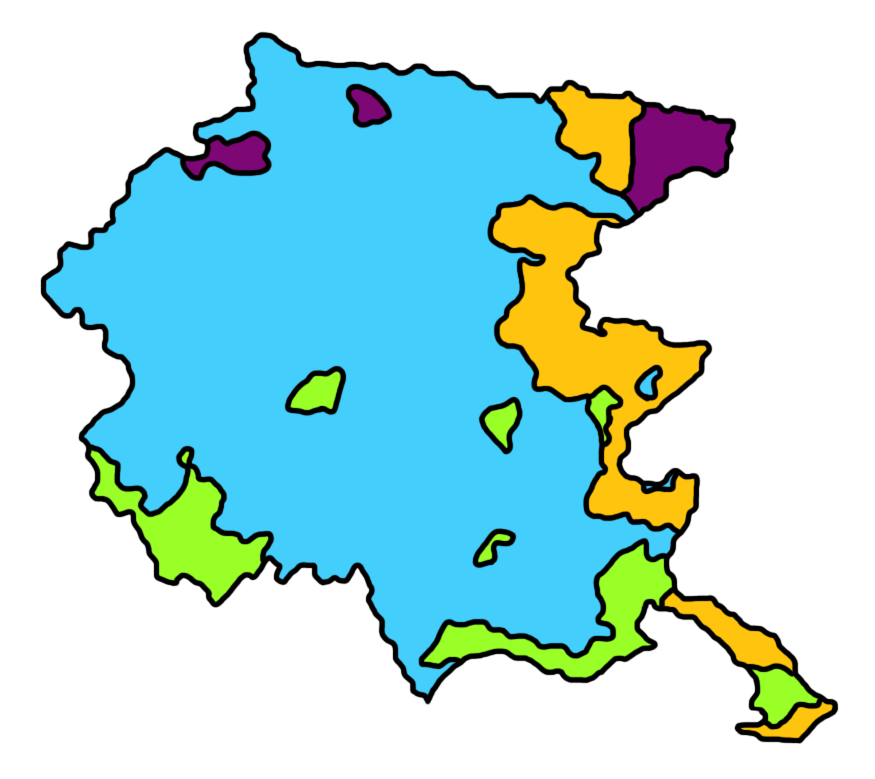
Languages of Friuli-Venezia Giulia. Friulian Venetian Slovene Austrian German

The Slovene minority in Italy lives in the autonomous region Friuli-Venezia Giulia, more precisely, in the provinces of Trieste, Gorizia and Udine. Slovene immigrants living in other parts of Italy are not considered as members of the minority. Slovenes live along the border with Slovenia. Their traditional area of settlement includes:

- the hinterland territory of the Province of Trieste (except for the town center of Muggia, which was until 1945 a homogeneous Istrian Italian urban settlement);
- a thin strip of territory along the border with Slovenia in the Province of Gorizia, including some neighborhoods of Gorizia;
- the mountainous area of north-east Friuli in the Province of Udine, known historically as Venetian Slovenia, comprising the Natisone Valley, the upper Torre Valley, and the Resia Valley;
- the Canale Valley in the Province of Udine, in the north-easternmost part of Italy, on the border with Austria and Slovenia.

Today the Slovene minority is present in 32 municipalities in the region: 6 in the Province of Trieste, 6 in the Province of Gorizia and 20 in the Province of Udine. In 16 of them, they are the majority of the population. In addition to these, since the early 1920s, the Slovenes have been immigrating to the industrial areas of the lower Isonzo valley, to the lowland areas around Monfalcone, known as Bisiacaria, and to larger Friulian cities (such as Udine, Pordenone, and others). The former are nowadays considered members of the Slovene minority and thus enjoy certain collective minority rights, while the latter do not.

The Slovene language is officially recognized in the following 32 municipalities, even though in many of these muncicipalities the presence of the Slovene minority is very small, representing as little as 2% of the population in some areas:

In the Province of Trieste:

- Duino-Aurisina (Devin-Nabrežina)
- Monrupino (Repentabor)
- Muggia (Milje)
- San Dorligo della Valle (Dolina)
- Sgonico (Zgonik)
- Trieste (Trst)

In the Province of Gorizia:

- Cormons (Krmin)
- Doberdò del Lago (Doberdob)
- Dolegna del Collio (Dolenje v Brdih)
- Gorizia (Gorica)
- Monfalcone (Tržič)
- Ronchi dei Legionari (Ronke)
- San Floriano del Collio (Števerjan)
- Savogna d'Isonzo (Sovodnje ob Soči)

In the Province of Udine:

- Attimis (Ahten)
- Cividale del Friuli (Čedad)
- Drenchia (Dreka)
- Grimacco (Grmek or Garmak)
- Lusevera (Bardo or Brdo)
- Montenars (Gorjani)
- Nimis (Neme)
- Pontebba (Tablja)
- Prepotto (Praprotno)
- Pulfero (Podbonesec)
- Resia (Rezija)
- San Leonardo (Podutana or Šent Lienart)
- San Pietro al Natisone (Špeter Slovenov or Špietar)
- Savogna (Sovodnje)
- Stregna (Srednje)
- Taipana (Tipana)
- Tarcento (Čenta)
- Tarvisio (Trbiž)
- Torreano (Tavorjana)

== Ethnic and territorial identity ==
The Slovene minority in Italy is highly differentiated along geographic, cultural-historical, identity and linguistic lines. In cultural-historical terms, three separate groups can be differentiated: the Slovenes of the Julian March (the Provinces of Trieste and Gorizia), the Slovenes from Venetian Slovenia, and the Slovenes from the Canale Valley (in the Province of Udine). Each of these three groups has had a significantly different history, which resulted in different identities. The Slovenes in the Resia Valley are sometimes considered as a fourth group, due to their specific linguistic features and separate identity; nevertheless, they share a common history, as well as similar cultural and linguistic features with the Slovenes from Venetian Slovenia.

=== Slovenes of Trieste and Gorizia ===
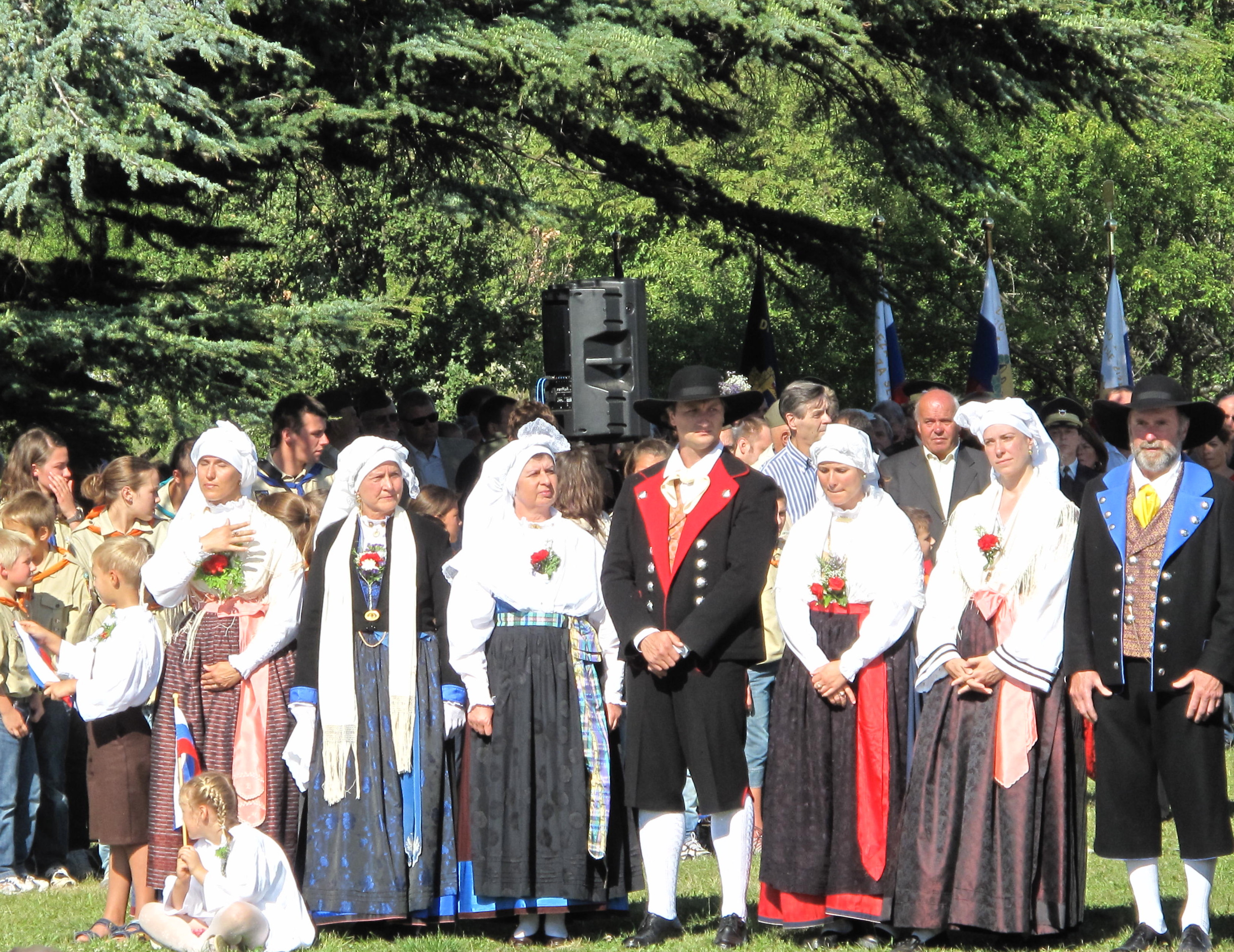
Some Basovizza residents in traditional Karst dress at a celebration

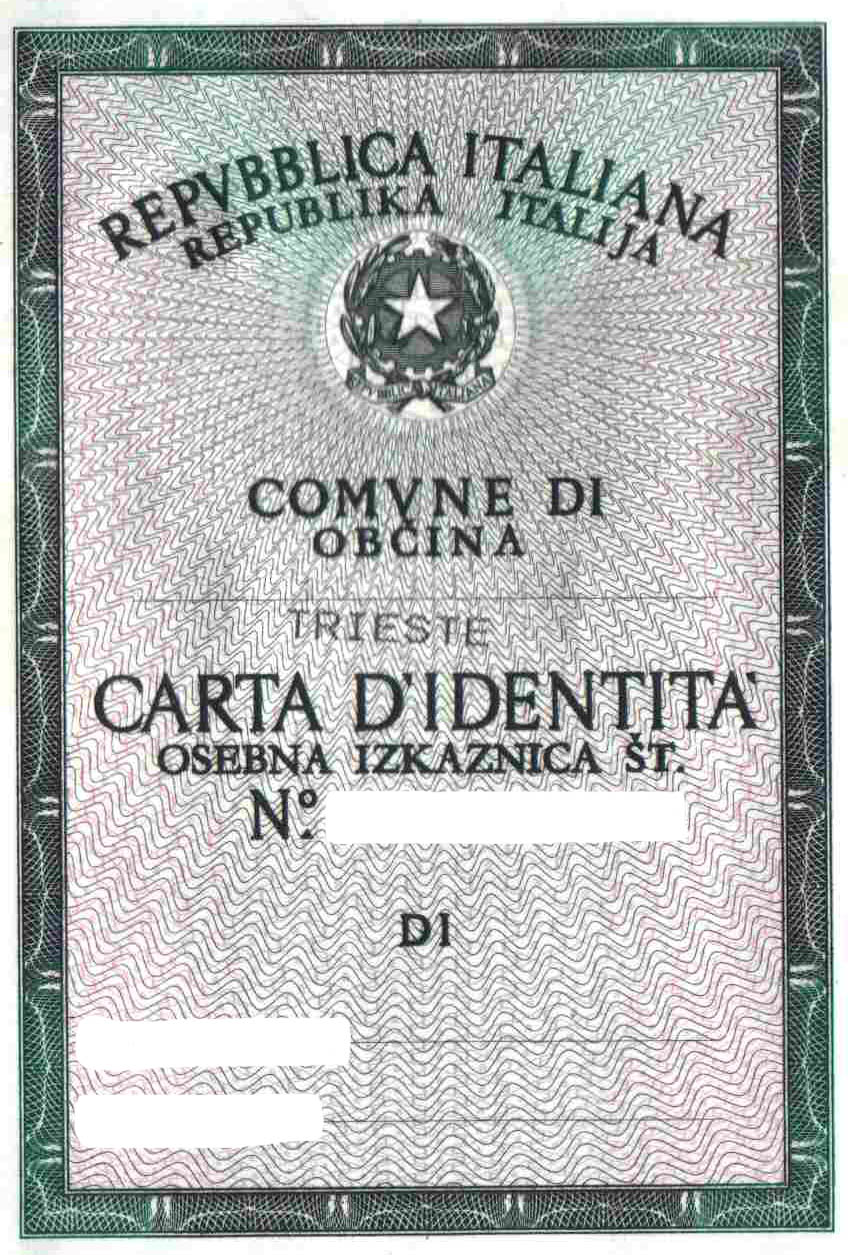
A bilingual identity card issued in Trieste

The Slovenes living in the Provinces of Trieste and Gorizia shared, until 1918, the same history with most other Slovenes: by the end of the 15th century, they were included in the Habsburg monarchy, and in the 19th century they actively participated in the Slovene national revival. Between 1849 and 1918, they were part of the Austrian administrative region known as Austrian Littoral, and were known as Littoral Slovenes (Primorski Slovenci). After 1918, they came under Italian administration and were included in the region known as the Julian March (Venezia Giulia). They shared the same fate as other Slovenes in the Julian March: they were subjected to Fascist Italianization, which gave rise to pro-Yugoslav irredentism. In 1947, after World War II, a new border between Italy and Yugoslavia was drawn, dividing the Julian March between the two states. The border was artificial, insofar as it was not based on any significant historical or geographical divides. In many cases, the border separated families and ran through fields and estates. All these reasons contributed to the strong connection between the Slovenes who remained in Italy with their counterparts that were annexed to Yugoslavia.

Until the 1950s and 1960s, the Slovenes from the Provinces of Gorizia and Trieste frequently referred to themselves as Littoral Slovenes. Since the 1960s, this identification with the Slovenian Littoral has faded, but it can still be traced in the names of certain institutions, most notably in the title of the Slovene daily newspaper of Trieste, called Primorski dnevnik which means “The Littoral Daily”. Between the 1940s and 1960s, the Slovenes from the Provinces of Gorizia and Trieste established the infrastructure of minority organizations that now serve the needs of the whole minority. They have enjoyed a certain degree of cultural autonomy (the most important feature being the education system in Slovene) since 1945, and they have maintained strong relations with Slovenia, especially with the neighboring border areas of the Slovenian Littoral. In 1986 the Slovenian community founded the football club Kras Repen, which locates its fan base among the Slovenes in Italy.

=== Venetian Slovenia ===
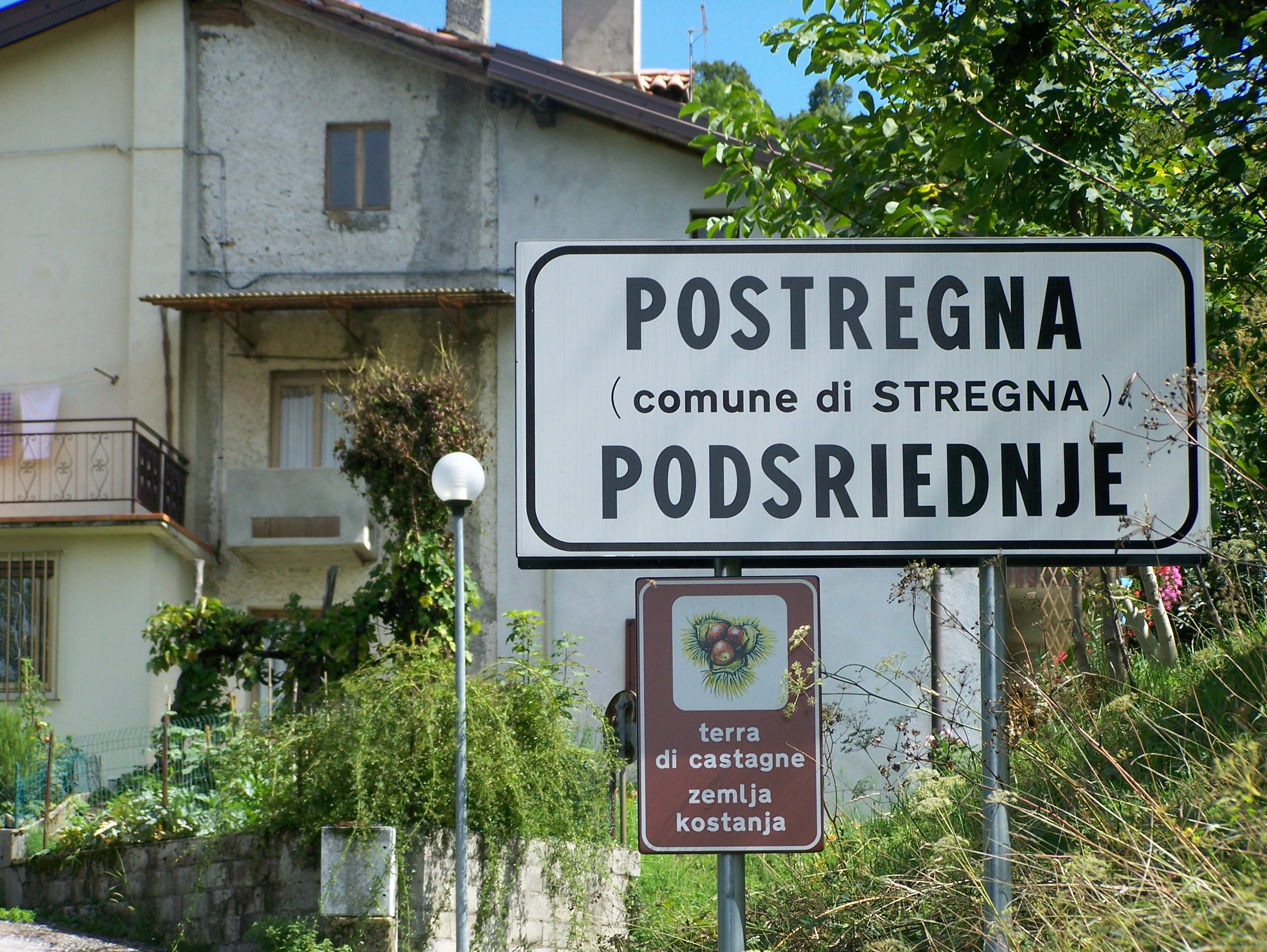
Bilingual Italian-Slovene signs in Stregna

Venetian Slovenia (Slovene: Beneška Slovenija or Benečija, Italian: Slavia Veneta) is the traditional name for Slovene-speaking areas in the valleys of upper Natisone and Torre rivers in eastern Friuli (currently in the Province of Udine). The history of these areas has been strongly linked to the history of Friuli. Unlike most other ethnic Slovene territories (including the areas of Gorizia and Trieste), this region was part of the Venetian Republic for around 350 years (hence the name of the region). During that period, they enjoyed a large degree of autonomy.

The Slovenes in this area were annexed to Italy together with the rest of the Venetia region in 1866, that is, half a century before the Slovenes of Gorizia and Trieste, who remained under Austrian rule until after World War I.

For long, the identity of the local Slovenes was mostly a linguistic and, to an extent, an ethnic one, but not a national one. The Slovenes of these areas lacked any form of collective minority or linguistic rights until the year 2000, when the Law for the Defense of the Slovene-Speaking Minority was passed by the Italian Parliament.

=== Canale Valley Slovenes ===
Around 3,000 Slovenes live in the Canale Valley in the north-easternmost part of the Province of Udine. The valley is currently divided among three municipalities: Tarvisio (Trbiž), Malborghetto Valbruna (Naborjet - Ovčja vas), and Pontebba (Tablja). Most of the local Slovenes live in the first two, representing around half of the population in Malborghetto Valbruna and a lower percentage in Tarvisio.

Until 1918, the Canale Valley (Kanalska dolina) was part of the Austro-Hungarian Empire. Since the Middle Ages, it was a part of the Duchy of Carinthia. The local Slovene speakers shared the same history, traditions and linguistic features with other Carinthian Slovenes. According to the last Austrian census of 1910, the valley had around 9,000 inhabitants, among whom around a third were Slovene speakers, with the remainder German speakers. In 1918, after the end of World War I, the valley was occupied by the Italian Army, and in 1919 it was officially annexed to Italy. In the 1920s and 1930s, many Italians were settled in this area, which bordered both Austria and Yugoslavia. In 1939, the South Tyrol Option Agreement between Italy and Nazi Germany was also applied to ethnic Germans in the area; as a consequence, most of the German-speaking population was resettled to neighboring Carinthia. New settlers from other parts of Italy gradually took their place, which significantly altered the ethnic composition of the valley.

Nowadays, Slovene is still spoken in several villages in the valley, especially Valbruna (Ovčja vas), Camporosso in Valcanale (Žabnice), Ugovizza (Ukve), and San Leopoldo (Lipalja vas). There has been a revival of Slovene language in these villages after 1990, with a focus on the younger generations.

=== Resia Valley ===
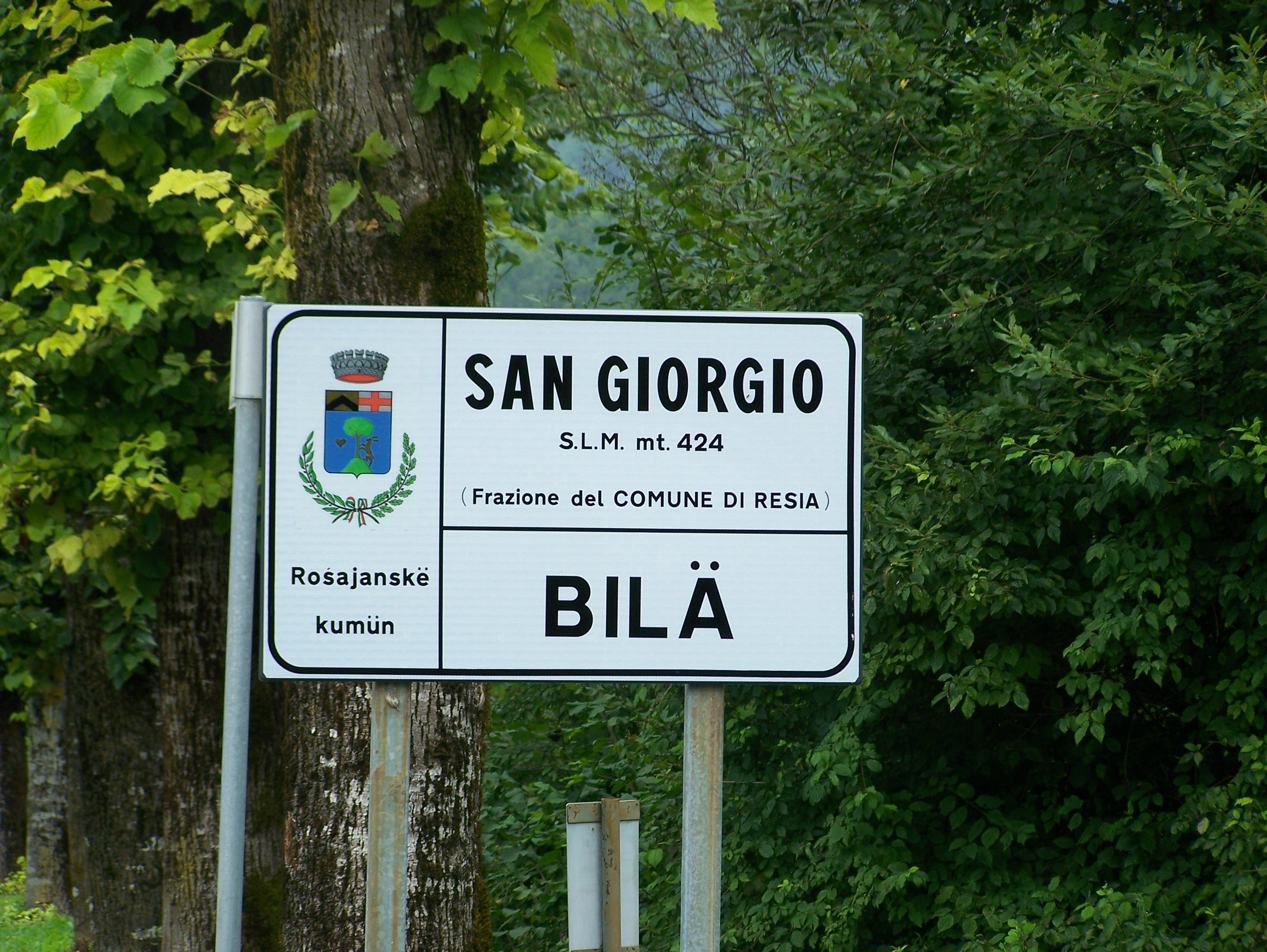
Bilingual Italian-Resian road sign in the Resia Valley, Friuli

The inhabitants of the Resia Valley (Rezija) in north-western Friuli speak a specific dialect of Slovene, known as Resian. Due to its specific phonetic features and archaic grammar, Resian is not mutually intelligible with standard Slovene and with most other Slovene dialects. Historically and culturally (as well as linguistically), Resia could be considered a part of Venetian Slovenia. According to Italian and regional legislation, Resians are considered as part of the Slovene minority in Italy; however, there are strong local movements that oppose identification with Slovenes and Slovene language, and defend a separate Resian identity.

== Notable Slovenes in Italy ==
Notable Slovenes, who were either born in what is today Italy, or who spent a considerable part of their lives in these area, include:

=== Actors, directors and showmen ===
- Miranda Caharija - actress
- Ferdo Delak - theatre and film director, journalist
- George Dolenz - film actor
- Boris Kobal - film director, actor and comedian
- Andro Merkù - comedian
- Franco Giraldi - film director and screenwriter

=== Architects and designers ===
- Franko Luin - type designer
- Boris Podrecca - architect
- Viktor Sulčič - architect

=== Authors ===
- Vladimir Bartol - writer
- Andrej Budal - writer and translator
- Igo Gruden - poet
- Dušan Jelinčič - writer and mountaineer
- Jovan Vesel Koseski - poet
- Miroslav Košuta - poet
- Boris Pahor - writer
- Alojz Rebula - writer and essayist from
- Josip Ribičič - writer
- Zora Tavčar - writer, essayist and translator
- Stanko Vuk - poet and Catholic political activist

=== Journalists ===
- Jurij Gustinčič - journalist
- Miran Hrovatin - photographer and camera operator
- Demetrio Volcic/Dimitrij Volčič - journalist, author and politician
- Sergio Tavčar - journalist
- Sergio Canciani - journalist
- Alessandro Saša Ota - journalist and photographer
- Barbara Gruden - journalist
- Vojmir Tedoldi - journalist

=== Musicians ===
- Edi Bucovaz - musician and singer
- Marij Kogoj - composer and writer
- Denis Novato - accordion player
- Alexander Gadjiev - classical pianist

=== Painters ===
- Milko Bambič - author, cartoonist, caricaturist, children's writer, illustrator, inventor and painter
- Franc Kavčič - painter
- Avgust Černigoj - painter
- Gojmir Anton Kos - painter
- Zoran Mušič - painter
- Klavdij Palčič - painter and print artist
- Lojze Spacal - painter
- Lojze Špacapan - painter
- Jožef Tominc - painter
- Edvard Stepančič - painter
- Edvard Zajec - painter and graphic artist

=== Politicians ===
- Engelbert Besednjak - politician, lawyer and journalist
- Darko Bratina - politician, sociologist and film theorist
- Miloš Budin - politician and professor
- Ivan Marija Čok - politician and lawyer
- Ivan Dolinar - politician, teacher and journalist
- Josip Ferfolja - politician, lawyer and human rights activist
- Rudolf Golouh - politician, editor, journalist and dramatist
- Ivan Nabergoj - politician and landlord
- Bogumil Remec - politician and entrepreneur
- Mitja Ribičič - politician
- Josip Vilfan - politician, lawyer and human rights activist
- Roberto Cosolini - politician

=== Psychotherapists ===
- Alenka Rebula Tuta - writer, poet and psychologist
- Pavel Fonda - psychiatrist, psychotherapist, and politician

=== Resistance fighters and anti-fascist activists ===
- Ferdo Bidovec - anti-Fascist insurrectionist
- Lojze Bratuž - choirmaster and composer
- Zorko Jelinčič - national liberal activist
- Fran Marušič - anti-Fascist insurrectionist
- Pinko Tomažič - communist activist
- Ivan Regent - communist activist

=== Scholars ===
- Milko Brezigar - economist
- Lavo Čermelj - physicist, political activist, journalist and author
- Boris Furlan - jurist, legal theorist
- Boris M. Gombač - historian
- Ivo Kerže - philosopher
- Franc Kos - historian
- Milko Kos - historian
- Niko Kuret - ethnologist
- Aleš Lokar - economist
- Pavle Merkù - ethnomusicologist
- Avgust Pirjevec - literary scholar
- Jože Pirjevec - historian
- Igor Škamperle - sociologist and writer
- Božo Škerlj - anthropologist
- Vladimir Truhlar - theologian and poet
- Marta Verginella - historian
- Sergij Vilfan - historian

=== Sports ===
- Arianna Bogatec – sailor
- Matej Černic – volleyball player
- Giordano Colausig – footballer
- Claudia Coslovich – athlete
- Nicolò Cudrig – footballer
- Gregor Fučka – former basketball player
- Barbara Lah – triple jumper
- Edoardo Reja – football manager and former football player
- Lidija Rupnik – gymnast
- Massimo Susic – footballer
- Luca Tomasig – footballer
- Giorgio Ursi – racing cyclist

=== Religious figures ===
- Frančišek Borgia Sedej - priest, bishop, archbishop and metropolitan(bishop)
- Ivan Nepomuk Glavina - archbishop
- Jože Prešeren - priest, publicist and cultural worker
- Jakob Ukmar - priest and writer
- Virgil Šček - priest and politician
- Ivan Trinko - priest, poet and translator
- Božo Zuanella - priest and historian
- Arturo Blasutto - priest
- Matevž Ravnikar - priest, bishop, poet and historian
- Jernej Legat - bishop and theologian

=== Others ===
- Sergej Mašera - naval lieutenant
- Edvard Rusjan - flight pioneer and airplane constructor
- Jožko Šavli - author, self-declared historian and high school teacher
- Franc Kalister - businessman and patron
- Janez Nepomuk Kalister - businessman and patron
- David Bandelj - poet, literary historian and choirmaster
- Lambert Ehrlich - priest, political figure and ethnologist
- Danilo Dolci - social activist, sociologist, popular educator and poet
- Gaetano Kanizsa - psychologist
- Guglielmo Oberdan - Italian nationalist activist and irredentist

== See also ==
- Slovene minority in Italy (1920–1947)
- Italy–Slovenia relations
- Italians in Slovenia
