= Gorizia (electoral district) =

Friuli-Venezia Giulia - 02 (Gorizia)
- Former uninominal district for the Chamber of Deputies
- Region: Friuli-Venezia Giulia
- Population: 197 305
- Major settlements: Gorizia; Monfalcone

Former uninominal district
- Created: 2017
- Abolished: 2020
- Party: Forza Italia
- Member: Guido Germano Pettarin
- Elected: 2018

The Gorizia electoral district (official name: Friuli-Venezia Giulia - 02 uninominal district) was an uninominal district in Italy for the Chamber of Deputies.

== Territory ==
As required by law, it's part of the Friuli-Venezia Giulia electoral constituency.

The Gorizia-district is composed by 51 comuni: Aiello del Friuli, Aquileia, Attimis, Campolongo Tapogliano, Capriva del Friuli, Cervignano del Friuli, Cormons, Doberdò del Lago, Dolegna del Collio, Drenchia, Duino-Aurisina, Faedis, Farra d'Isonzo, Fiumicello, Fogliano Redipuglia, Gorizia, Gradisca d'Isonzo, Grado, Grimacco, Lusevera, Mariano del Friuli, Medea, Monfalcone, Monrupino, Moraro, Mossa, Nimis, Prepotto, Pulfero, Resia, Romans d'Isonzo, Ronchi dei Legionari, Ruda, Sagrado, San Canzian d'Isonzo, San Floriano del Collio, San Leonardo, San Lorenzo Isontino, San Pier d'Isonzo, San Pietro al Natisone, Savogna, Savogna d'Isonzo, Sgonico, Staranzano, Stregna, Taipana, Terzo d'Aquileia, Torreano, Turriaco, Villa Vicentina e Villesse.

The district was composed by the province of Gorizia and a part of the Udine and Trieste one.

The district was part of the Friuli-Venezia Giulia - 01 plurinominal district.

== Elected ==
Election	Deputy	Party
2018	Guido Germano Pettarin	Forza Italia

== Electoral results ==
2018 general election: Gorizia
Party	Candidate	Votes	%	±%
Forza Italia	Guido Germano Pettarin	42 495	37,14	New
Five Star Movement	Sabrina De Carlo	32 308	28,24	New
Democratic Party	Giorgio Brandolin	28 530	24,93	New
Free and Equal	Paolo Vizintin	4 860	4,25	New
CasaPound	Sara Cericco	1 261	1,10	New
Power to the People	Marco Barone	1 220	1,07	New

Candidates	Party	Votes	%
Guido Germano Pettarin	Lega Nord FVG	25 325	22,13
Guido Germano Pettarin	Forza Italia	11 165	9,76
Guido Germano Pettarin	Brothers of Italy	4 805	4,20
Guido Germano Pettarin	Us with Italy-UDC	1 200	1,05
Sabrina De Carlo	Five Star Movement	32 308	28,24
Giorgio Brandolin	Democratic Party	23 639	20,66
Giorgio Brandolin	More Europe	3 725	3,26
Giorgio Brandolin	Italy Europe Together	619	0,54
Giorgio Brandolin	Popular Civic	547	0,48
Paolo Vizintin	Free and Equal	4 860	4,25
Sara Cericco	CasaPound	1 261	1,10
Marco Barone	Power to the People	1 220	1,07
Others	Others	3 747	3,28
