= Palčič =

Palčič is a surname. Notable people with the surname include:

- Klavdij Palčič (born 1940), Italian painter
- Matej Palčič (born 1993), Slovenian footballer
