= Slavia Friulana =

Mountain region in northeastern Italy

Coordinates: 46°8′22″N 13°27′39″E

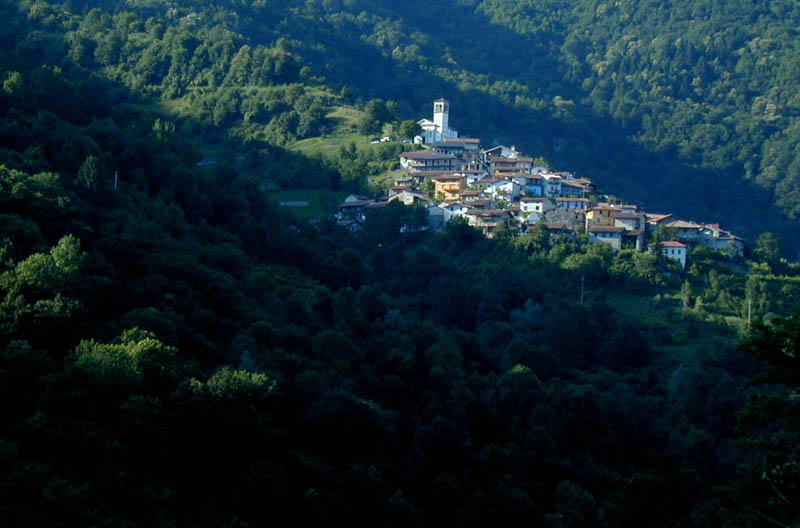
The village of Topolò in the municipality of Grimacco, Friulian Slavia

Slavia Friulana, which means Friulian Slavia, also known as Venetian Slovenia (Slovene: Beneška Slovenija), is a small mountainous region in northeastern Italy and western Slovenia. It is so called because of its Slavic population which settled here in the 6th century AD. The Italian territory is located in the Italian region of Friuli-Venezia Giulia, between the town of Cividale del Friuli and the Slovenian border. The Slovenian territory encompasses ten villages in the area of the Breginj Combe.

== Extent ==
The term Slavia Friulana could possibly be used to refer to all Friulian territories with a Slavic presence, including the municipalities of Lusevera, Taipana, Torreano, Resia, San Pietro al Natisone, San Leonardo, Pulfero, Drenchia, Grimacco, Stregna, Savogna and the mountainous areas of the municipalities of Tarcento, Nimis, Attimis, Faedis, Prepotto and Montenars.

== Name ==
Since the beginning of the 8th century AD (c. 720), Slavic people settled in this area and in the Middle Ages they would have been called Sclavons. In the early 16th century, the Venetian authorities dubbed this border region of their Republic as Schiavonia Veneta, meaning "Venetian Slav-land". The Venetian words Schiavoni and Schiavonia were general terms used for all Slavic peoples

In Slovene, the traditional term has been Beneška Slovenija, which is a literal translation of Schiavonia Veneta. Until the early 19th century, there was no distinction between the terms "Slav" and "Slovene" in Venetian Slavia. However, from the times of Romantic nationalism onward, the term Slovenija, which had been sporadically used to denote lands inhabited by Slovenes/Slavs, took over a new meaning, denoting the idea of modern Slovenia. The old term Beneška Slovenija was thus assimilated to a new meaning, as its name now meant "Venetian Slovenia". As a more neutral colloquial term, the name Benečija came into usage, which however also means Veneto in Slovene.

After World War I, as soon as the Italian kingdom expanded its borders eastwards (including slavophone territories in Istria and in the so-called Habsburgic Illyrian kingdom), the region started to be commonly called Slavia Friulana instead of a generic Slavia Italiana.

== History ==
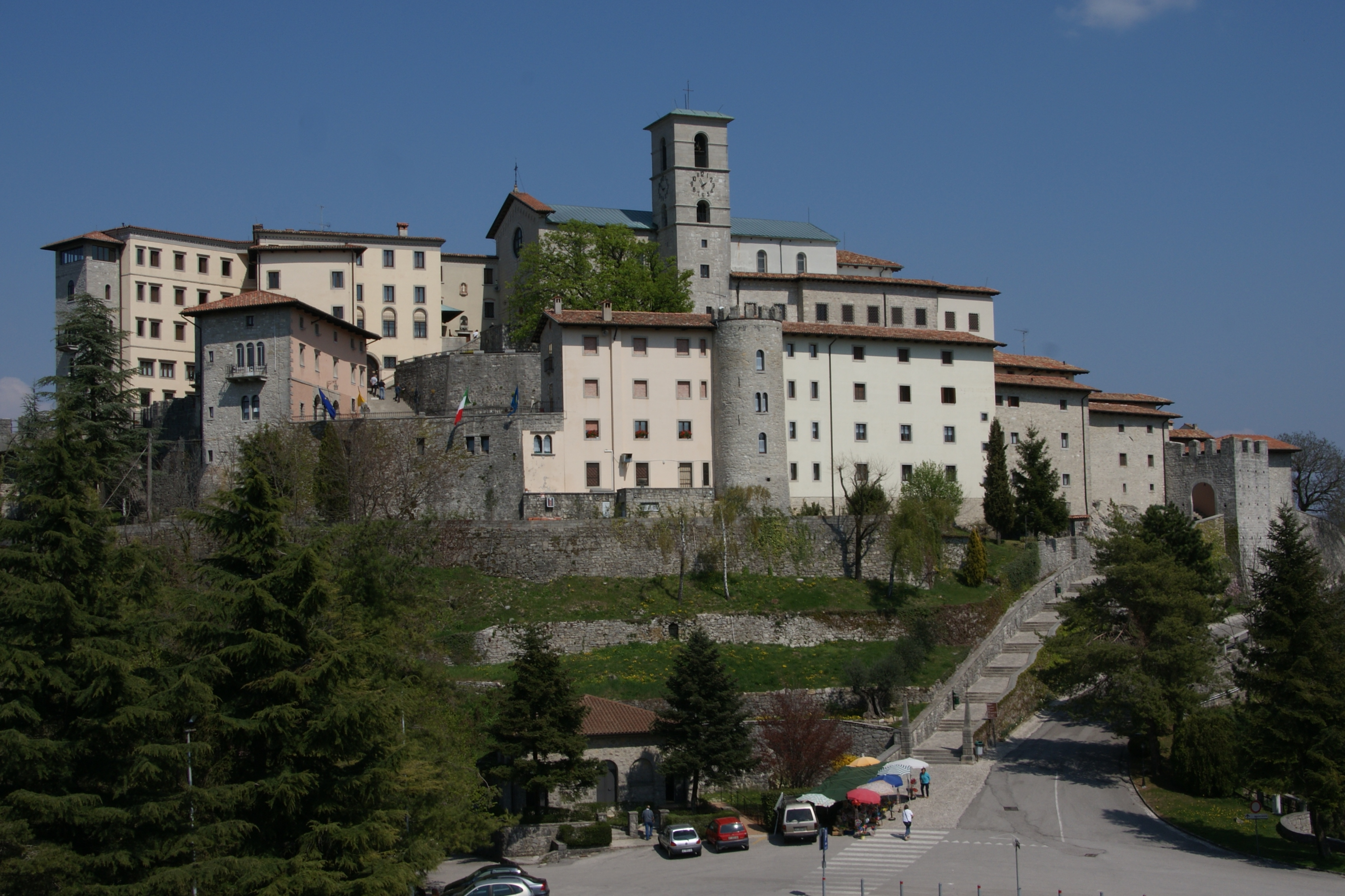
The sanctuary of Castelmonte (Stara Gora) has been the most important religious centre of Slavia Veneta since the 11th century.

=== Early periods ===
In the late 6th century Slavic tribes settled the area. They stopped in front of the Lombard defensive line on the edge of Friuli, which today represents the approximate linguistic border between Slovenian and Friulian. The Alpine Slavs western neighbors were the Lombards, with whom they frequently fought between the 7th and 8th centuries.

From the 9th century onward, the region belonged first to the Duchy of Friuli and later to the Patriarchate of Aquileia.

=== Under the Venetian Republic ===
In 1420 the Patriarchate of Aquileia was invaded by the Republic of Venice. The Venetian authorities decided to absorb the Natisone Valley "gastaldia di Antro " in the Cividale's one, but at the same time they gave the local Slavs a remarkable autonomy. In fact, the territory was structured in two co-valleys (Antro and Merso) represented by their people's assemblies called arenghi; each co-valley had also the right to elect its own judges and its own tribunals (banche) whose judiciary power extended to the villages that weren't the object of feudal investitures; the whole Schiavonia had important tax benefits and its only military duties were to provide 200 men for the border defense against the neighbouring Habsburg Empire and fortify the nearby city of Cividale and the fortress of Palmanova as well. The ancient and commercial road of the Natisone valley, which connected Carniola to Italy, lost its importance soon after the Habsburgs inherited the county of Gorizia and conquered Upper Isonzo Valley; the Austrians built another road to Gorizia passing along the border and this caused economic damage to the whole area which became poorer than it was before.

=== Napoleonic and Austrian rule ===
In 1797, most of the Venetian Republic was annexed to the Habsburg Empire, including Schiavonia Veneta. The Habsburg authorities abolished the ancient privileges of the local Slav populations, as they had already done with a similar system of autonomy in neighboring Tolmin County in 1717. In 1805, the region was submitted to French rule, which did not restore the privileges, but replaced the old boroughs with French-style townships, led by government-appointed mayors. In 1813, the region fell again under Habsburg domination and in 1815 it was included in the Austrian administrative unit of Lombardy-Venetia. Most of the reforms introduced by the French authorities were kept.

Under the rule of the Austrian Empire, the clergy began to teach standard Slovenian to the population. Peter Podreka (1822–1889) gave the young people the Slovene Alphabet (1852) and the Slovene Catechism (1869), with which they began to learn standard Slovenian for the first time in history.

=== Under the Kingdom of Italy ===
Slavia Friulana came under Italy only in 1866 when Prussia and Italy managed to defeat the Austrian Empire militarily. Despite the fact that the Kingdom of Italy was not successful in the war, it still managed to gain Venetia because Prussia defeated the Austrian army in Bohemia. Thus, the Venetian Slovenes came to the new state. On October 7, 1866, King Victor Emmanuel II issued a decree that the inhabitants of Venice must decide whether they wanted to belong to Italy or not. A plebiscite was not foreseen in the peace treaty, the outcome was only supposed to reflect the will of the population. In the case of the Venetian plebiscite, this was precisely what became fatal for the local Slovenes: their massive ›Si‹‹ was later interpreted by the authorities as a free path to Italianization. A plebiscite is characterized by a popular vote deciding whether a territory belongs to a certain country, and in 1866 the territory was already assigned by the peace treaty. The plebiscite is carried out under international control, which was not the case in Venice. Legal experts believe that this was more of a referendum – confirmation of the will of an authority. The result of the plebiscite was almost entirely in favor of the Kingdom of Italy, where almost everyone who could vote voted for the Kingdom of Italy. The inhabitants of Venetian Slovenia decided for Italy in the plebiscite because they had good memories of the Venetian Republic, which granted them favorable economic and political conditions, and they wanted Italy to implement these laws again, but this did not happen.

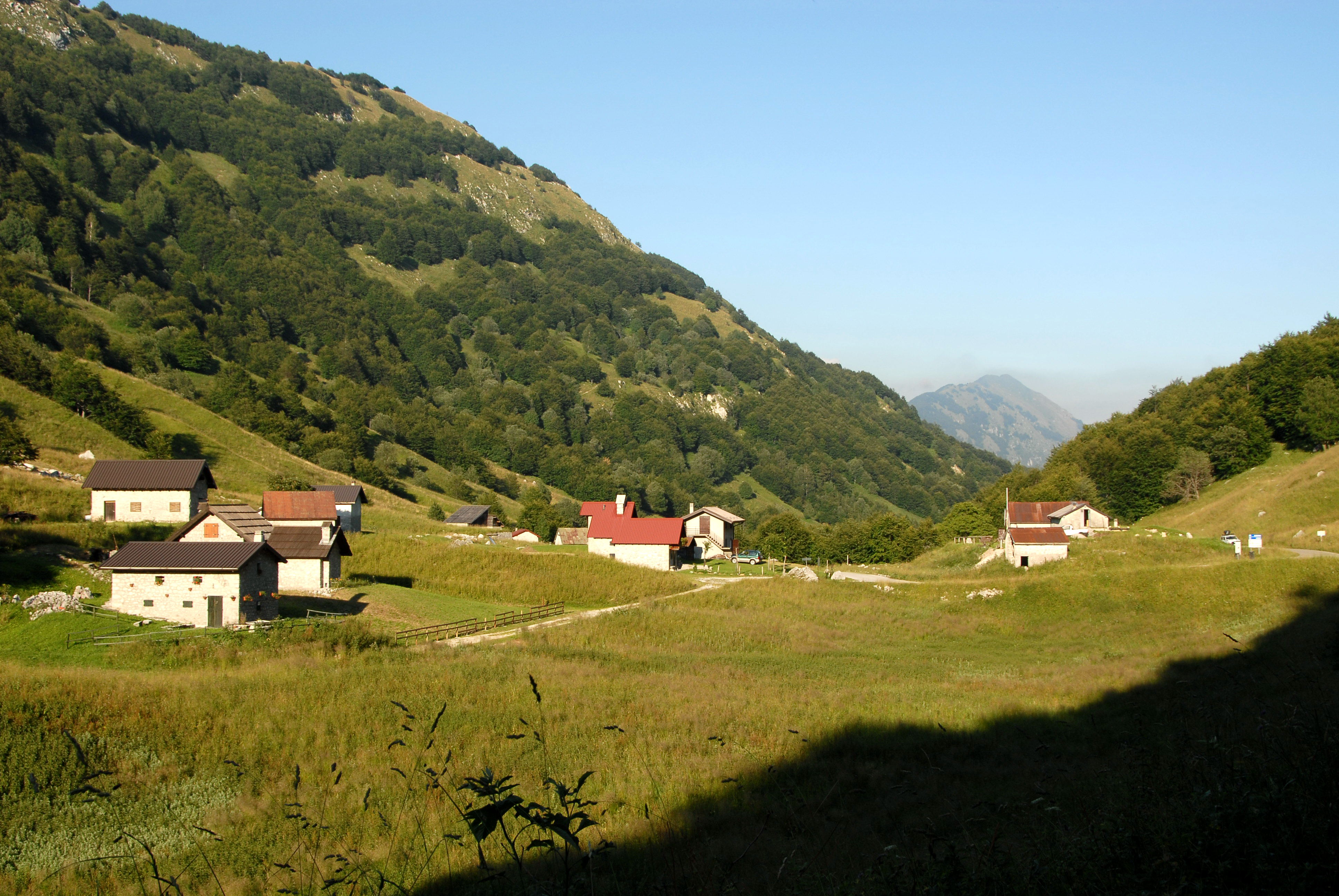
The Carnizza, linking the upper Torre Valley with the Resia Valley.

Italian became the sole official language. The local population were considered "Italians with a Slav origin"; the local traditions were mostly respected with the exception of the Slovenian language, which was seen as less important and due to nationalistic reasons, it was not taught in schools where the only language of instruction was Italian until the establishment of a bilingual school in San Pietro al Natisone in 1978. While Slovenian was taught only by priests in churches. By establishing Italian schools and providing education in Italian, the Kingdom of Italy wanted to create among the people the idea of a common Italian national identity, since this idea had not previously existed among the inhabitants of this region.

During this period, the region became a major focus of historians, linguists and ethnologists, interested in its archaic customs, dialects and common law. Scholars who wrote about Slavia Friulana included the Italo-Slavs Carlo Podrecca and Francesco Musoni, the Polish linguist Jan Niecisław Baudouin de Courtenay, the Slovenes Simon Rutar and Henrik Tuma.

After 1870, when Italy conquered Rome, reducing the Pope's territories to the Vatican City, the Italo-Slavic priests (who had fought for the union with Italy in the preceding decades) started a hard political action against the new kingdom: for this reason and because of the Slovenian national movement in Austria-Hungary they refused to consider themselves Italians but Slovenes. This trend became even more pronounced after the annexation of the Julian March to the Kingdom of Italy in 1920, when a large Slovene-speaking minority was included within the borders of the Italian state.

After 25 years of the Fascist regime, all public and religious use of other languages were forbidden. This feature was further emphasized by the Slovene anti-fascist and nationalist propaganda (both left-wing and conservative-Catholic), which frequently portrayed the Slavia Friulana as the symbol of Slovene resistance to Fascist Italianization, often simplifying the complex linguistic and social realities of the region. The best-known literary portrayal of the area was written in 1938 by the Slovene writer France Bevk from Gorizia in his novel "The Vicar Martin Čedermac" (Kaplan Martin Čedermac).

During World War II the Slovene partisan resistance, led by the Liberation Front of the Slovenian People, penetrated the region. The Kobarid Republic was established as a temporary administration after the Italian armistice in early September 1943.

In early November 1943, Nazi German forces crushed the insurgency, and incorporated the whole area into the Operational Zone Adriatic Coast. In 1944, the Italian resistance movement also became active in the mountains of Slavia Friulana. Tensions between the Yugoslav (Slovene) and Italian resistance movements rose. The Liberation Front of the Slovenian People wanted to annex the region to a Yugoslav Communist federation, while the Italian resistance was split between the Communists who partially supported the Yugoslav claims, and the Liberal-democratic who wanted Slavia Friulana to remain part of Italy.

In February 1945, the Porzus massacre occurred, in which the communist and filo-Yugoslav Italian partisans killed several members of the Italian liberal-democratic resistance members. In May 1945 the whole area was invaded by the Yugoslav People's Army, which however withdrew a few weeks later after the British arrival. Liberal-democratic-catholic partisans, members of the Royal Army and the defeated fascist soldiers joined up together to fight the communists and the Yugoslavs.

=== Italian Republic ===
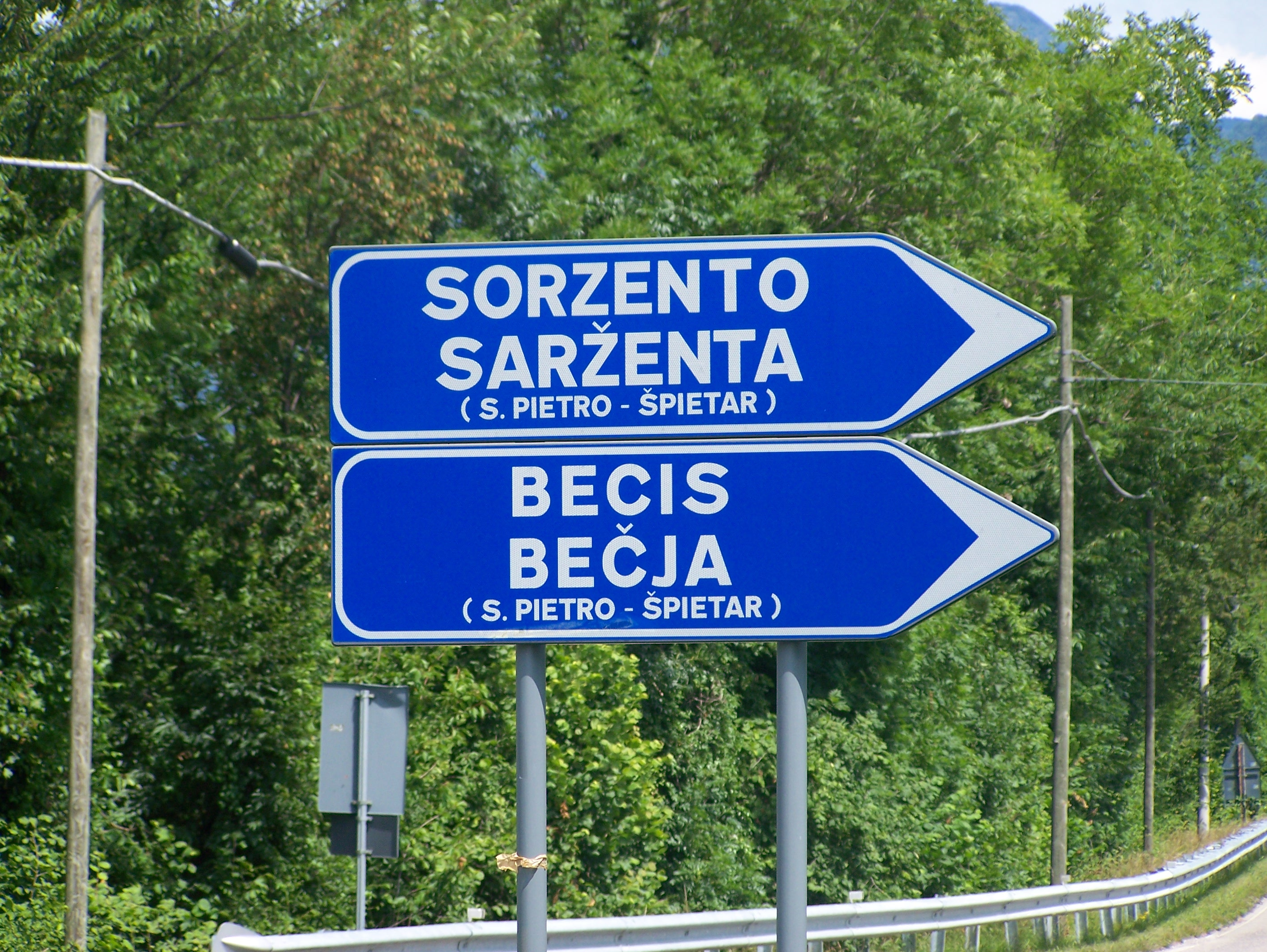
The first bilingual signs in Slavia Friulana were erected in the late 1990s.

In 1945, Slavia Friulana again became an integral part of Italy. It was included in the region of Friuli-Venezia Giulia. Between 1945 and 1947, Slavia Friulana was a region on the border with the Communist Bloc, and it was listed as a special operational zone of Gladio, a clandestine NATO "stay-behind" operation in Italy after World War II, intended to counter a possible Warsaw Pact invasion of Western Europe. The activists of Gladio were mostly local members of the Alpini troops.

After the war, discrimination against Slovenes continued, as the Italians equated Slavs with communism and saw them as potential traitors and spies, even though they were fairly loyal to Italy, unlike the Slovenes in the Gorizia and Trieste regions.

In the following decades, the presence of a militarized border didn't allow an economic and infrastructural development and this situation caused a widespread emigration during the same period. Europe's ideological division ignited in this area an ethnic one: local communists continued to support the Yugoslav socialist regime claiming the recognition of a Slovene minority; also a few priests continued to identify the population as Slovene. On the other hand, some locals consider themselves as Italo-slavs or nedižouci (inhabitants of the Natisone valley; singular: nedižovac) and rečanji (inhabitants of the Alberone, Erbezzo and Cosizza valleys; singular: rečanj). They claim to speak nediško, with ethnical differences by the Slovene neighbours. Although Yugoslavia started its dissolution after Josip Broz Tito died in 1980 and the cold war ended in 1989, this ethnic debate hasn't been cleared yet and it's still caged within an ideological contest.

==== Population trends ====
Municipality Italian/Nediško	1871	1881	1901	1911	1921	1931	1936	1951	1961	1971	1981	1991
Drenchia/Dreka	1036	1278	1389	1424	1562	1458	1285	1392	1128	599	359	255
(%)	66.3	81.8	88.9	91.2	100	93.3	82.3	89.1	72.2	38.3	25.4	16.3
Grimacco/Garmak	1324	1560	1570	1678	1780	1621	1543	1737	1645	929	760	591
(%)	74.4	87.6	88.2	94.3	100	91.1	86.7	97.6	92.4	52.2	43	33.2
Pulfero/Podbuniesac	3256	2492	3779	3991	4066	3864	3681	3735	3306	2237	1831	1307
(%)	80.1	85.9	92.9	98.2	100	95.0	90.5	91.9	81.3	55	45.1	32.1
S. Leonardo/Svet Lienart	2188	2382	2639	2623	2637	2424	2222	2283	2077	1375	1220	1128
(%)	83	90.3	100	99.5	100	92.6	84.3	86.6	78.8	52.1	46.9	42.8
S.Pietro al N./Špietar	2811	3182	3313	3525	3544	3039	3077	3088	2842	2331	2066	2173
(%)	79.3	89.8	93.5	99.5	100	85.8	86.8	87.1	80.2	65.8	58.1	61.3
Savogna/Sauodnja	1820	2017	2078	2026	2143	2044	1867	2077	1741	1226	1017	786
(%)	84.9	94.1	97	94.5	100	95.40	87.1	96.9	81.2	57.2	48	36.7
Stregna/Srednje	1616	1710	1805	20 00	1908	1908	1722	1883	1554	952	730	538
(%)	84.7	89.6	94.6	104.8	100	100	90.3	98.7	81.4	49.9	38.3	28.1
Total	14051	15621	16573	17267	17640	16358	15397	16195	14293	9649	8051	6869
(%)	79.7	88.6	94	97.9	100	94.3	87.3	91.8	81	54.7	45.6	38.9
Italy (in millions)	27.30	28.96	32.97	35.85	38.45	41.65	42.99	47.52	50.62	54.13	56.57	56.41
(%)	71	75.3	85.7	93.2	100	108.3	111.8	123.6	131.7	140.8	147.1	146.7

Many of the villages lost more than two thirds of their populations, as Slavs from Friulian Slavia moved to larger urban areas in Northern Italy, Switzerland, Belgium and Germany. In May and September 1976, two earthquakes hit Friuli, causing large scale damages.

=== After 1977 ===
Although the area was largely depopulated after 1977, the political pressure was lifted after the Treaty of Osimo between Italy and Yugoslavia, but with no economic improvement. In the late 1970s, the first elementary and high school with Slovene as a language of instruction was established in San Pietro al Natisone, and in 2001, the Italian state recognized the local population as a Slovene minority living in the area, guaranteeing it full rights but ignoring the claims of those who consider themselves as non-Slovene.

After Slovenia's entry into the European Union in 2004, the relations between the Slavia Friulana and the bordering Goriška region have intensified.

== Language, culture and religion ==
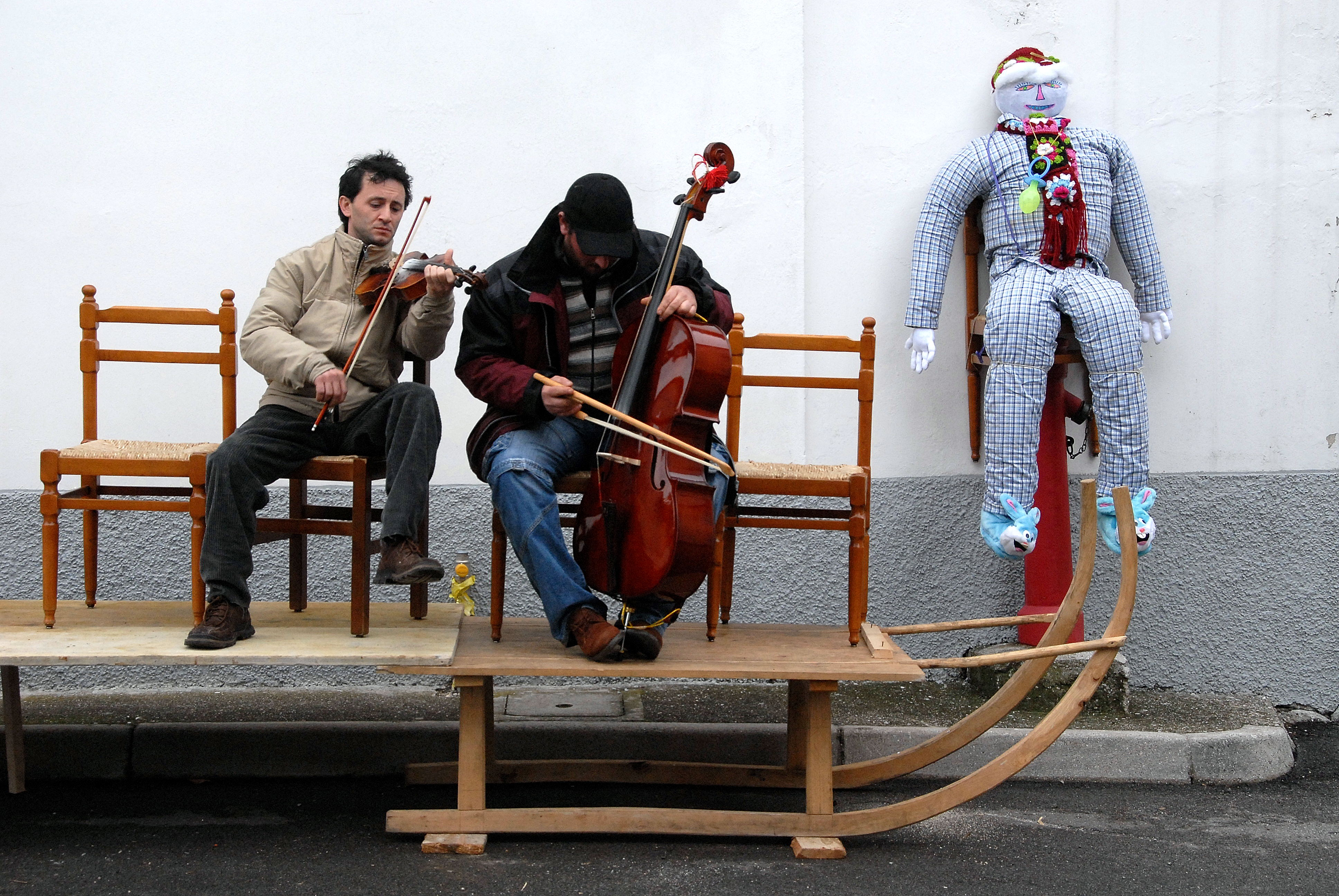
The carnival in the Resia Valley.

Most people in Slavia Friulana (considering the whole slavophone area) speak three different Slovene dialects, named after the major valleys that form those territories: first of all the Natisone Valley dialect, the Torre Valley dialect and the Resian dialect. The first two are closely related to each other and to other dialects in the Littoral dialect group. While the Resian dialect is more closely related to the Slovenian Carinthian dialects.

Almost all of the inhabitants are fluent in Italian, which is taught in schools and present in the media and in the administration. Friulian is also widespread, especially in the municipalities of Montenars, Tarcento, Nimis, Attimis, Torreano, and Prepotto. Because of the lack of education in Slovene in the Resian and Torre valleys, some of the inhabitants do not master standard Slovene. Many do not understand it either, especially in the areas where the Slovenian TV and radio are not accessible, since standard Slovene is not entirely intelligible with the dialects spoken in the region, due to the large number of Friulian and Italian loanwords. They are however intelligible with the neighbouring Slovene dialects spoken in the Slovenian Littoral, especially the Soča and Brda dialects.

The vast majority of the people belong to the Roman Catholic Church and the religion plays an important role in the local culture. The Roman Catholic priests have traditionally been the most important promoters of the Slovene language and culture in Slavia Friulana. Anyway, the linguistic matter hasn't been clarified yet. In the late 19th century, the Polish linguist Jan Baudouin de Courtenay considered the four local languages as different Slavic ones, rich in Slavic archaisms which make them often sound closer to Serbian. He classified the four Friulian Slav groups as those of the Resia Valley, Torre Valleys, Natisone Valleys, and Judrio Valleys.

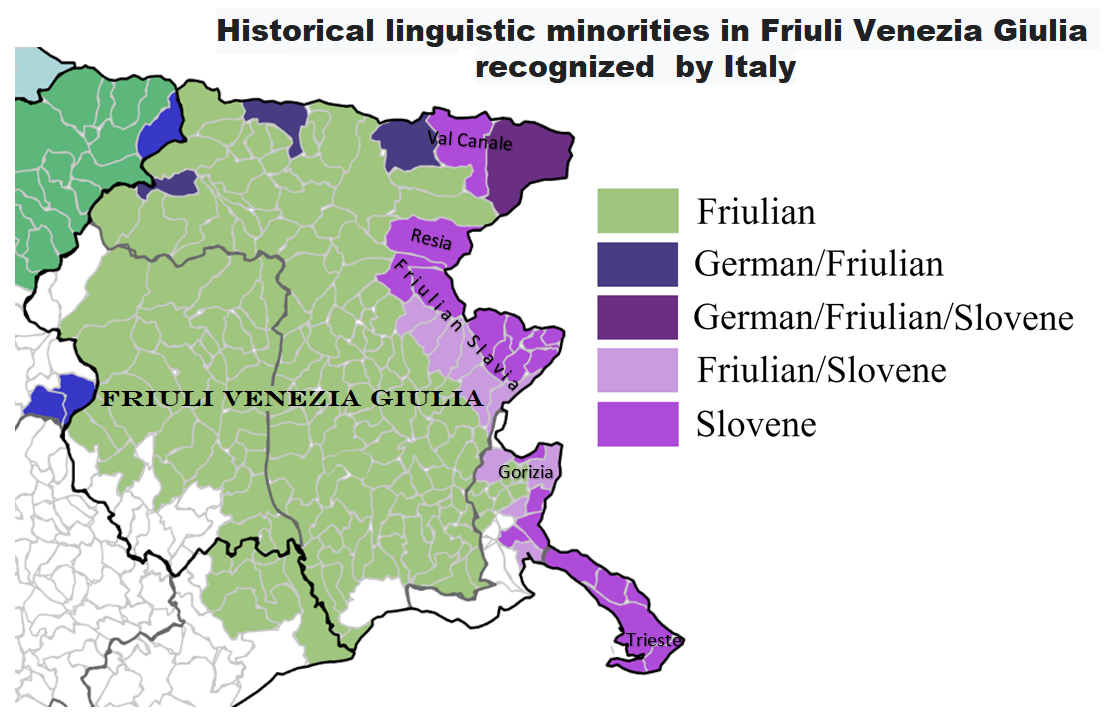
Linguistic minorities in Friuli-Venezia Giulia

Slavia Friulana is known for its rich folk traditions. Numerous folk and ethno music bands come from the region, and many of them are popular throughout Slovenia and the Friuli-Venezia Giulia. The best-known of these bands are probably the Beneški fantje ("Venetian Lads"), which are considered to be oldest still existing Slovene band. Besides its archaic traditional music and dances, the Resia valley is also known for its folk tales, mainly animal fables; these were edited and translated into standard Slovene by the scholar Milko Matičetov, and published as a children's picture book by Mladinska knjiga in 1976. The book saw eight editions and was adapted into a puppet show ("Beasties from Resia") by RTV Slovenija in 1976, with a huge impact in popularizing the Friulian Slav folk culture in Slovenia.

Since the late 1980s, Slavia Friulana has also emerged as one of the major centres of high quality Slovene dialect poetry. The best-known poets from the region are Silvana Paletti, Francesco Bergnach, and Marina Cernetig.

Since 1994, the artistic project Stazione di Topolò – Postaja Topolove or "Topolò Station" takes place every summer in the small village of Topolò (Slovene: Topolovo, known as Topolove or Topoluove in the local dialect). The project, which is the most important cultural and artistic event in the region, is an attempt to bring together contemporary visual art with and the local folk traditions.

== Notable people from the region ==
- Anton Klodič Sabladoski, philologian, linguist and poet
- Terezija Dush, Slovenian herder, servant, nanny, and Marian seeress
- Jožef Školč, politician (from Breginj), founder and first president of the Liberal Democratic Party
- Pietro Fanna, professional soccer player
- Lorenzo Crisetig, professional footballer
- Roberto Chiacig, professional basketball player

== See also ==
- Friuli
- Patriarchate of Aquileia
- Slovene Lands
- Slovene Union
- Resian dialect

== Sources ==
- Carlo Podrecca, Slavia italiana, Cividale 1884
- Carlo Podrecca, Slavia italiana – Polemica, Cividale 1885
- Carlo Podrecca, Le vicinìe, Cividale 1887
- Bonessa et al., Slavia friulana, Cormons 2013; you can read the text here
- Marinelli et al., Guida delle Prealpi Giulie, Udine 1912
- Nino Špehonja, Nediška gramatika, Cormons 2012
- Nino Špehonja, Besednjak Nediško-Taljansko, Cormons 2012
- Nino Špehonja, Vocabolario Italiano-Nediško, Cormons 2012
- Giuseppe Jaculin, Gli Slavi del Natisone, Tavagnacco 1996
- Bogo Grafenauer, "The Autonomy of Venetian Slovenia" in Slovenci v Italiji po drugi svetovni vojni (Ljubljana, Koper, Trieste: Cankarjeva založba, Primorski tisk, Založništvo tržaškega tiska, 1975), 105–109.
- Svetozar Ilešič, "Beneška Slovenija" in Encyclopedia of Yugoslavia, ed. by Miroslav Krleža (Zagreb: Leksikografski zavod FNRJ, 1955–1971).
- Simon Rutar, Beneška Slovenija (Ljubljana: Slovenska matica, 1899).
- Gaetano Salvemini, Racial minorities under fascism in Italy (Chicago : The Women's International League for Peace and Freedom, 1934).
- Henrik Tuma, Avtonomna uprava Beneška Slovenije (Ljubljana: Slovenski pravnik, 1933).
- Sergij Vilfan, L'autonomia della Slavia Italiana nel periodo patriarcale e veneto (Trieste-San Pietro: Quaderni Nadiža, 1987).
- Fran Zwitter, The Venetian Slovenes (Ljubljana: Institute for Ethnic Studies, 1946).
- Tadej Koren, Beneška Slovenija po drugi svetovni vojni: fenomen paravojaških enot (Ljubljana: Univerza v Ljubljani, 2005).
- Branko Marušič, Primorski čas pretekli (Koper, Trieste, Nova Gorica: Lipa – Založništvo tržaškega tiska – Goriški muzej, 1985).
- Venezia, una republica ai confini (Mariano del Friuli: Edizioni della Laguna, 2004).
- Faustino Nazzi, Alle origini della "Gladio": la questione della lingua slovena nella vita religiosa della Slavia Friulana nel secondo dopoguerra (Udine: La Patrie dal Friûl, 1997).
- Natalino Zuanella, Gli anni bui della Slavia: attività delle organizzazioni segrete nel Friuli orientale (Cividale del Friuli: Società Cooperativa Editrice Dom, 1996).
