= Corno di Rosazzo =

Corno di Rosazzo Cuar di Rosacis (Friulian)
- Comune
- Comune di Corno di Rosazzo
- Location within Italy Location within Friuli-Venezia Giulia
- Coordinates: 45°59′N 13°27′E
- Country: Italy
- Region: Friuli-Venezia Giulia
- Province: Udine (UD)

Government
  - Mayor: Loris Basso

Area
  - Total: 12.5 km^{2} (4.8 sq mi)

Population (Dec. 2004)
  - Total: 3,313
  - Density: 265/km^{2} (686/sq mi)
- Time zone: UTC+1 (CET)
  - Summer (DST): UTC+2 (CEST)
- Postal code: 33040
- Dialing code: 0432

Corno di Rosazzo (Friulian: Cuar di Rosacis) is a comune (municipality) in the Regional decentralization entity of Udine in the Italian region of Friuli-Venezia Giulia, located about 45 kilometres (28 mi) northwest of Trieste and about 20 kilometres (12 mi) southeast of Udine. As of 31 December 2004, it had a population of 3,313 and an area of 12.5 square kilometres (4.8 mi^{2}).

Corno di Rosazzo borders the following municipalities: Cividale del Friuli, Cormons, Dolegna del Collio, Manzano, Premariacco, Prepotto, San Giovanni al Natisone.

== Demographic evolution ==
Historical population

Year	Pop.	±%
1861	?	—
1871	1,411	—
1881	1,465	+3.8%
1901	1,624	+10.9%
1911	1,961	+20.8%

Year	Pop.	±%
1921	1,976	+0.8%
1931	2,014	+1.9%
1936	1,990	−1.2%
1951	2,088	+4.9%
1961	2,159	+3.4%

Year	Pop.	±%
1971	2,443	+13.2%
1981	2,971	+21.6%
1991	3,193	+7.5%
2001	3,308	+3.6%

Source: Data from ISTAT
