= Pavel Fonda =

- Born: September 22, 1942 (age 83); Servola, Trieste
- Education: University of Padua
- Occupations: psychiatrist, psychotherapist

Pavel Fonda (born September 22, 1942), is a psychiatrist, psychotherapist and a notable member of Slovene minority in Italy. He was a mayor of Aurisina local community from 1984 to 1985 in the Province of Trieste, Italy.

== Life ==
He was born Servola, Trieste (Slovene: Škedenj). After finishing elementary and high school with Slovene as the language of instruction, he studied medicine at the University of Padua. In 1968, he specialized in psychiatry in Milan, where he worked for few years at the university.

== Work ==
In 1970, he moved from Milan to Trieste and worked in local hospital. He was also running the Aurisina center for mental health. After 1990, he served as an International Psychoanalytical Association's trainer for the trainees in psychoanalysis in Eastern Europe and managed (2002-2014) the Psychoanalytic Institute for Eastern Europe. In 2014 in Ljubljana he was in the team of founders of the Slovenian Society for Psychoanalytic Psychotherapy (affiliated to the European Federation for Psychoanalytic Psychotherapy.

== Psychology ==
- 2007 Psycho-grammes at the Border (in Slovene: Obmejni psihogrami). In: Cogoy, Renate; Luisa Accati (eds) (2007) The Foibe: An Example of psychopathological reception of history (original in German: Das Unheimliche in der Geschichte. Die foibe: Beiträge zur Psychopathologie historischer Rezeption), Trafo-Verlag. ISBN 978-3896261892
