= Miroslav Košuta =

Slovenian poet, playwright and translator (1936–2026)

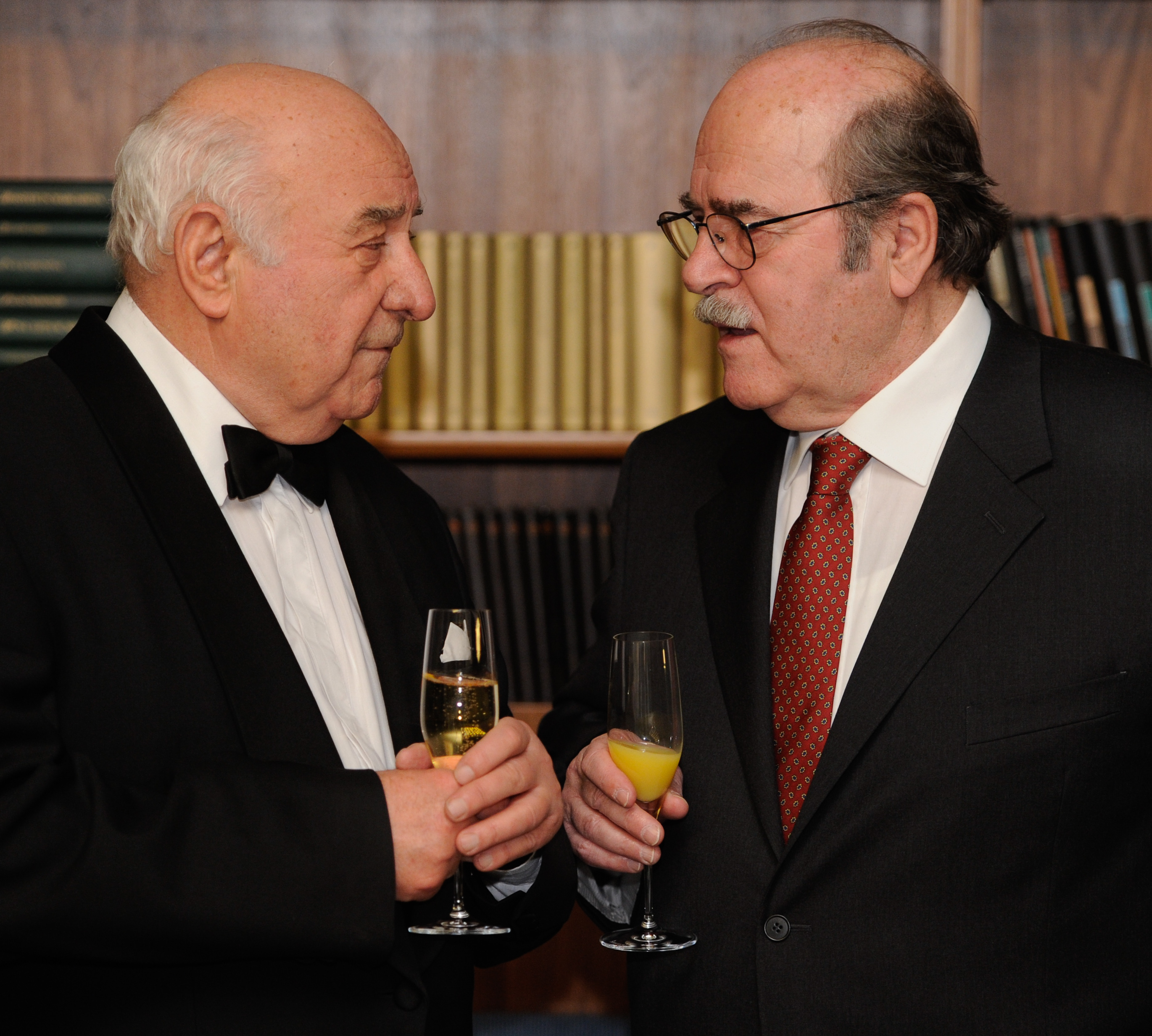
Anton Nanut and Miroslav Košuta at the Prešeren Award reception in 2011

Miroslav Košuta (11 March 1936 – 2 February 2026) was a Slovene poet, playwright and translator from Križ by Trieste, a younger representative of Intimism and Socialist Realism. On 7 February 2011, he received the Prešeren Award, the highest cultural award in Slovenia, for his poetry and contributions to the preservation of the Slovene in Italy. Košuta died on 2 February 2026, at the age of 89.
