= Torreano =

Torreano Tavorjana (Slovene) Torean (Friulian)
- Comune
- Comune di Torreano
- Location within Italy Location within Friuli-Venezia Giulia
- Coordinates: 46°8′N 13°26′E
- Country: Italy
- Region: Friuli-Venezia Giulia
- Province: Udine (UD)

Area
  - Total: 34.9 km^{2} (13.5 sq mi)
- Elevation: 189 m (620 ft)

Population (Dec. 2004)
  - Total: 2,301
  - Density: 65.9/km^{2} (171/sq mi)
- Time zone: UTC+1 (CET)
  - Summer (DST): UTC+2 (CEST)
- Postal code: 33040
- Dialing code: 0432
- Website: Official website

Torreano (Slovene: Tavorjana; Friulian: Torean) is a comune (municipality) in the Regional decentralization entity of Udine in the Italian region of Friuli-Venezia Giulia, located about 60 kilometres (37 mi) northwest of Trieste and about 15 kilometres (9 mi) northeast of Udine, on the border with Slovenia. As of 31 December 2004, it had a population of 2,301 and an area of 34.9 square kilometres (13.5 mi^{2}). According to the census 1971 24,5% of the population are Slovenes.

Torreano borders the following municipalities: Kobarid (Slovenia), Cividale del Friuli, Faedis, Moimacco, Pulfero, San Pietro al Natisone.

== Demographic evolution ==
Historical population

Year	Pop.	±%
1861	?	—
1871	2,706	—
1881	2,775	+2.5%
1901	3,151	+13.5%
1911	3,505	+11.2%

Year	Pop.	±%
1921	3,607	+2.9%
1931	3,357	−6.9%
1936	3,234	−3.7%
1951	3,404	+5.3%
1961	2,918	−14.3%

Year	Pop.	±%
1971	2,352	−19.4%
1981	2,267	−3.6%
1991	2,259	−0.4%
2001	2,266	+0.3%

Source: Data from ISTAT

== See also ==
- Venetian Slovenia
- Friuli
- Slovene Lands
