= Dolegna del Collio =

- Comune
- Comune di Dolegna del Collio
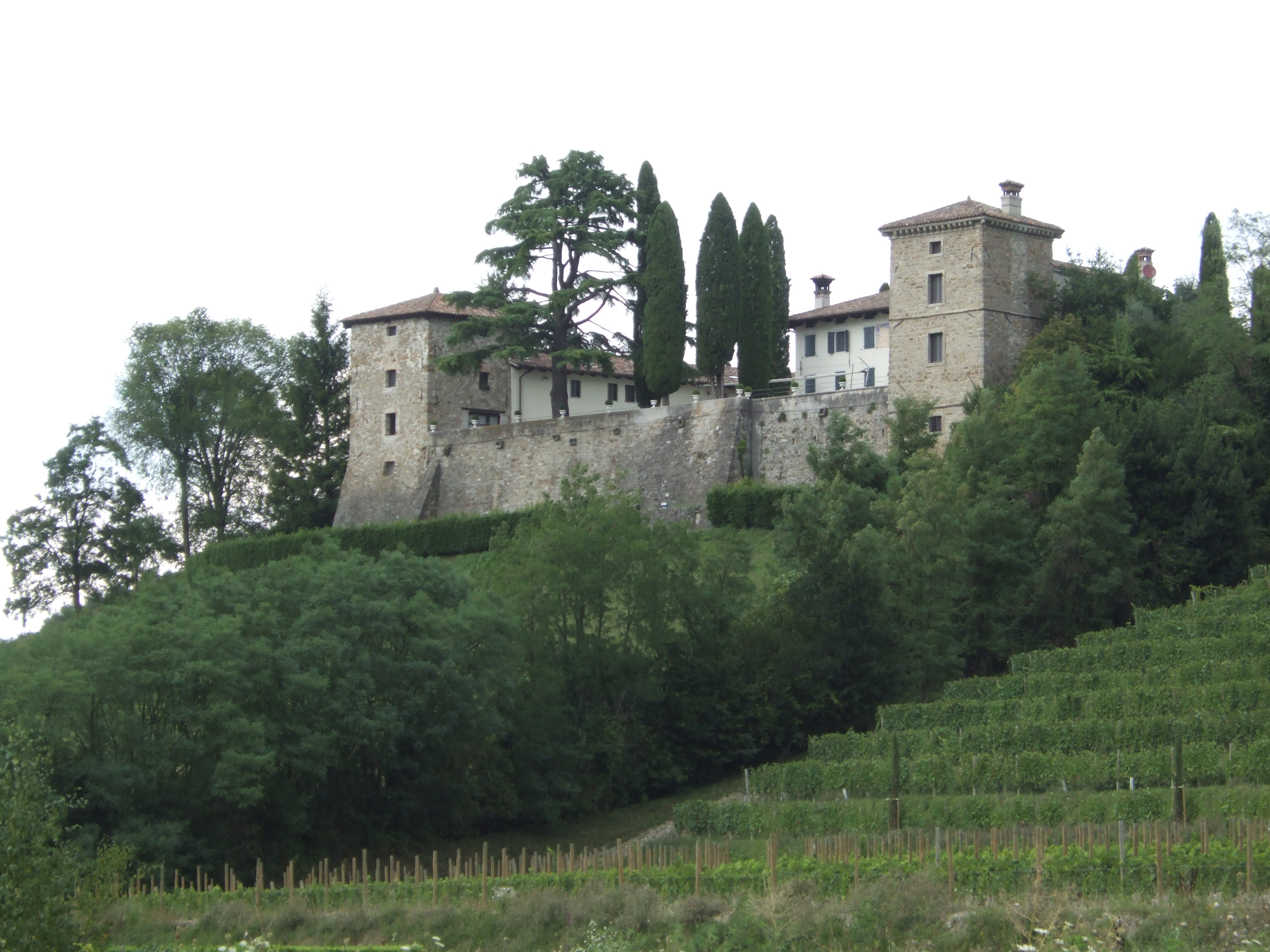

- Location within Italy Location within Friuli-Venezia Giulia
- Coordinates: 46°2′N 13°29′E
- Country: Italy
- Region: Friuli-Venezia Giulia
- Province: Gorizia (GO)
- Frazioni: Mernicco, Restoccina, Ruttars, Scriò, Trussio, Breg, Lonzano, Venco, Barbana nel Collio

Government
  - Mayor: Diego Bernardis

Area
  - Total: 12.5 km^{2} (4.8 sq mi)
- Elevation: 90 m (300 ft)

Population (Dec. 2004)
  - Total: 419
  - Density: 33.5/km^{2} (86.8/sq mi)
- Time zone: UTC+1 (CET)
  - Summer (DST): UTC+2 (CEST)
- Postal code: 34070
- Dialing code: 0481

Dolegna del Collio (Slovene: Dolenje; Standard Friulian: Dolegne dal Cuei; Southeastern Friulian: Dolegna dal Cuei) is a comune (municipality) in the Regional decentralization entity of Gorizia in the Italian region of Friuli-Venezia Giulia, located about 50 kilometres (31 mi) northwest of Trieste and about 15 kilometres (9 mi) northwest of Gorizia, on the border with Slovenia. As of 31 December 2004, it had a population of 419 and an area of 12.5 square kilometres (4.8 mi^{2}).

The municipality of Dolegna del Collio contains the frazioni (boroughs) Mernicco, Restoccina, Ruttars, Scriò, Trussio, Breg, Lonzano, Venco, and Barbana nel Collio.

Dolegna del Collio borders the following municipalities: Brda (Slovenia), Cormons, Corno di Rosazzo, Prepotto.

== Demographic evolution ==
Historical population

Year	Pop.	±%
1861	?	—
1871	?	—
1881	?	—
1901	?	—
1911	?	—

Year	Pop.	±%
1921	1,510	—
1931	1,371	−9.2%
1936	1,364	−0.5%
1951	1,178	−13.6%
1961	961	−18.4%

Year	Pop.	±%
1971	701	−27.1%
1981	597	−14.8%
1991	520	−12.9%
2001	435	−16.3%

Source: Data from ISTAT
