= Klavdij Palčič =

Klavdij Palčič (born 5 August 1940 in Trieste, Italy) is a painter, print artist. After graduating from the Secondary School of Science in Trieste, Palčič's plan was to study political sciences, but he changed his mind and entered the Venice School of Arts where he graduated in 1964.

During the 1960s, Palčič was a member of the Trieste art group “Raccordosei-Arte viva” and taught art and art history classes at various Slovenian high schools in the area of Trieste and in Gorizia. During the 1970s he established and managed a print art studio in Trieste.

Palčič's works appeared at every group exhibition prepared by “Raccordosei–Arte viva” as well as many International Exhibitions of Graphic Arts in Ljubljana, and, since 1967, in numerous anthological exhibitions by artists from the Friuli and Julian region. He has held several solo exhibitions and exhibited at over 150 group exhibitions in Slovenia, Italy, and other parts of the world.

Palčič received numerous awards and prizes in Slovenia, Italy and many other countries. In 1984, the artist received the Prešeren Fund Award in the category of fine arts and scene design. Palčič works in the fields of painting, printing, book illustration, scene design and costume design. He has worked as a scenographer with theatres in Trieste, Ljubljana, Vienna and Venice. He lives and works in Trieste, Italy.
