= San Leonardo, Friuli Venezia Giulia =

San Leonardo Svet Lienart/Podutana (Slovene) San Lenàrt (Friulian)
- Comune
- Comune di San Leonardo
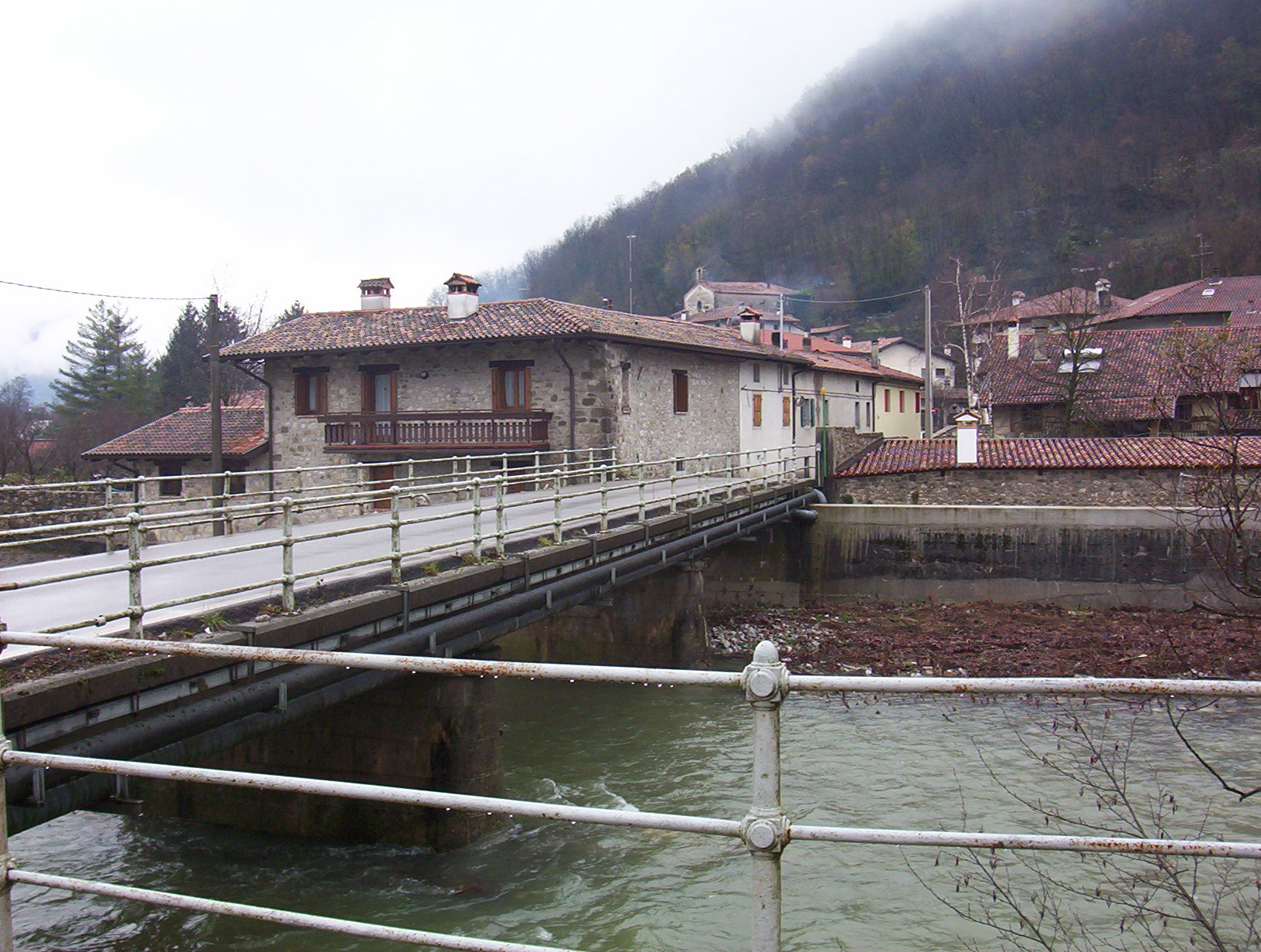

- Location within Italy Location within Friuli-Venezia Giulia
- Coordinates: 46°7′N 13°32′E
- Country: Italy
- Region: Friuli-Venezia Giulia
- Province: Udine (UD)
- Frazioni: Altana-Utana, Camugna-Kamunja, Cemur-Čemur, Cernizza-Čarnica, Cisgne-Čišnje, Clastra-Hlastra, Cosizza-Kosca, Cravero-Kravar, Crostù-Hrastovije, Dolegna-Dolenjane, Grobbia-Grobje, Iainich-Jagnjed, Iesizza-Jesičje, Iessegna-Jesenje, Merso di Sopra-Gorenja Miersa, Merso di Sotto-Dolenja Miersa, Osgnetto-Ošnije, Ovizza-Ovica, Picig-Pičič, Picon-Pikon, Podcravero-Podkravar, Postacco-Puostak, Precot-Prehod, Scrutto-Škrutove, Seuza-Seucè, Ussivizza-Ušiuca, Zabrida-Zabardo, Zamir-Zamier

Government
  - Mayor: Antonio Comugnaro

Area
  - Total: 26.91 km^{2} (10.39 sq mi)
- Elevation: 168 m (551 ft)

Population (December 2010)
  - Total: 1,169
  - Density: 43.44/km^{2} (112.5/sq mi)
- Time zone: UTC+1 (CET)
  - Summer (DST): UTC+2 (CEST)
- Postal code: 33040
- Dialing code: 0432
- Patron saint: Leonard of Noblac
- Saint day: November 6
- Website: Official website

San Leonardo (Slovene: Svet Lienart or Podutana; Friulian: San Lenàrt) is a comune (municipality) in the Regional decentralization entity of Udine in the Italian region of Friuli-Venezia Giulia, located about 60 kilometres (37 mi) northwest of Trieste and about 25 kilometres (16 mi) east of Udine, and borders the following municipalities: Grimacco, San Pietro al Natisone, Savogna, Stregna, and Prepotto.

San Leonardo localities include: Altana-Utana, Camugna-Kamunja, Cemur-Čemur, Cernizza-Čarnica, Cisgne-Čišnje, Clastra-Hlastra, Cosizza-Kosca, Cravero-Kravar, Crostù-Hrastovije, Dolegna-Dolenjane, Grobbia-Grobje, Iainich-Jagnjed, Iesizza-Jesičje, Iessegna-Jesenje, Merso di Sopra-Gorenja Miersa, Merso di Sotto-Dolenja Miersa, Osgnetto-Ošnije, Ovizza-Ovica, Picig-Pičič, Picon-Pikon, Podcravero-Podkravar, Postacco-Puostak, Precot-Prehod, Scrutto-Škrutove, Seuza-Seucè, Ussivizza-Ušiuca, Zabrida-Zabardo, Zamir-Zamier.
Municipal hall is located in Merso di Sopra.

== Ethnic composition ==
89.2% of the population in San Leonardo were Slovenes according to the census 1971.

== People ==
- Edi Bucovaz, founder of the Slovene popular music band Beneški fantje
- Luigi Faidutti, political leader of the Friulians in the Austro-Hungarian Monarchy

== See also ==
- Venetian Slovenia
- Friuli
- Slovene Lands
