= Drenchia =

Drenchia Dreka (Slovene) Drencje (Friulian)
- Comune
- Comune di Drenchia
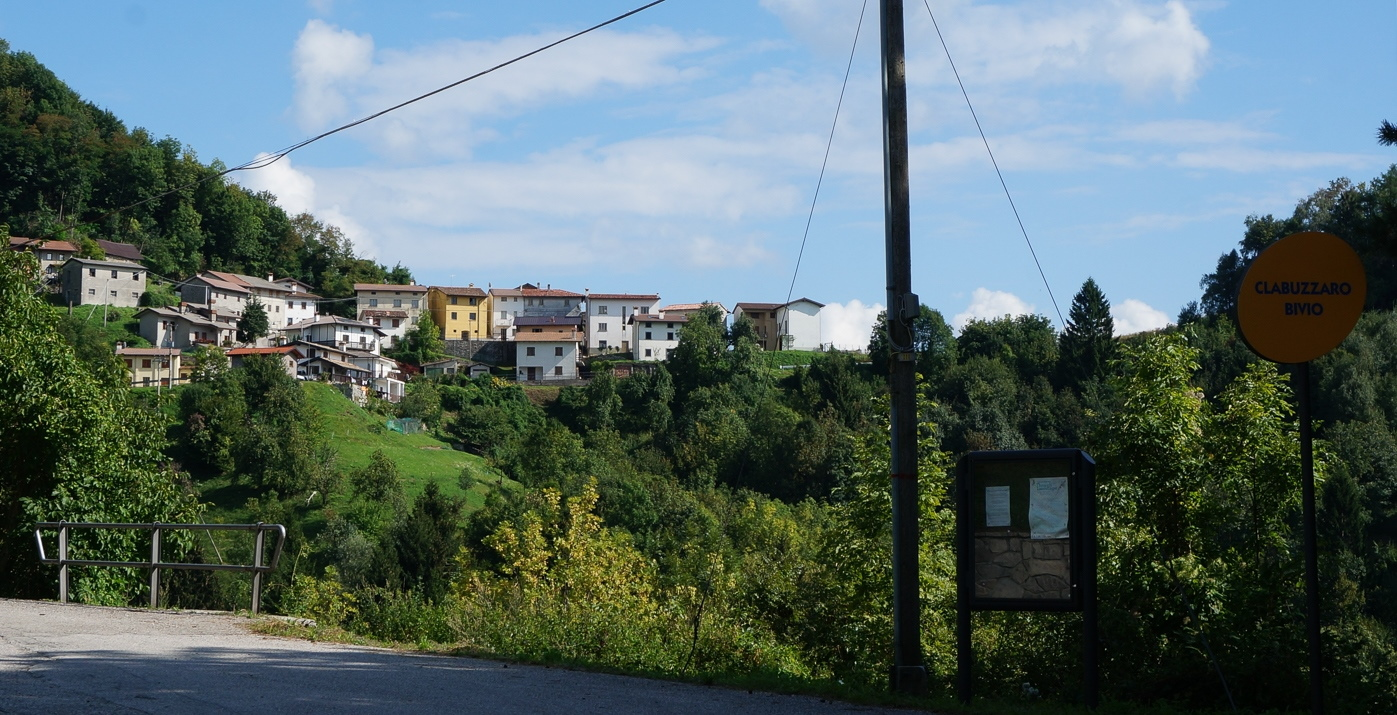
- Clabuzzaro

- Location within Italy Location within Friuli-Venezia Giulia
- Coordinates: 46°11′N 13°39′E
- Country: Italy
- Region: Friuli-Venezia Giulia
- Province: Udine (UD)
- Frazioni: Clabuzzaro/Brieg, Crai/Kraj, Cras/Kras (municipal seat), Drenchia inferiore/Dolenja Dreka, Drenchia Superiore/Gorenja Dreka, Lase/Laze, Malinsche/Malinske, Obenetto/Dubenije, Obranche/Obranke, Oznebrida/Ocnebardo, Paciuch/Pačuh, Peternel/Peternel, Prapotnizza/Praponca, San Volfango/Svet Štuoblank, Trinco/Trinko, Trusgne/Trušnje, Zavart/Zavart, Zuodar/Cuoder.

Government
  - Mayor: Mario Zufferli (Lista civica)

Area
  - Total: 12.01 km^{2} (4.64 sq mi)
- Elevation: 663 m (2,175 ft)

Population (2026)
  - Total: 88
  - Density: 7.3/km^{2} (19/sq mi)
- Time zone: UTC+1 (CET)
  - Summer (DST): UTC+2 (CEST)
- Postal code: 33040
- Dialing code: 0432
- Patron saint: Assumption of Mary
- Saint day: August 15
- Website: Institutional website

Drenchia (Slovene: Dreka; Friulian: Drencje) is a village and comune (municipality) in the Regional decentralization entity of Udine in the autonomous region of Friuli-Venezia Giulia in Italy, located about 60 kilometres (37 mi) north of Trieste and about 35 kilometres (22 mi) northeast of Udine, on the border with Slovenia. It has 88 inhabitants.

Drenchia is located on the western slopes of the Kolovrat Range, dividing Italy from Slovenia, and borders the following municipalities: Grimacco, Kanal ob Soči (Slovenia), Kobarid (Slovenia), and Tolmin (Slovenia).

== Demographics ==
As of 2026, the population is 88, of which 53.4% are male, and 46.6% are female. Minors make up 3.4% of the population, and seniors make up 52.3%.

97% of the population in Drenchia were Slovenes according to the 1971 census.

Historical population

Year	Pop.	±%
1861	-	—
1871	1,345	—
1881	1,278	−5.0%
1901	1,389	+8.7%
1911	1,424	+2.5%
1921	1,562	+9.7%
1931	1,458	−6.7%
1936	1,285	−11.9%

Year	Pop.	±%
1951	1,392	+8.3%
1961	1,128	−19.0%
1971	599	−46.9%
1981	397	−33.7%
1991	255	−35.8%
2001	197	−22.7%
2011	134	−32.0%
2021	99	−26.1%

Source: ISTAT

=== Immigration ===
As of 2025, immigrants make up 15.7% of the total population. The 3 largest foreign countries of birth are France, Romania, and Serbia.

== Gallery ==
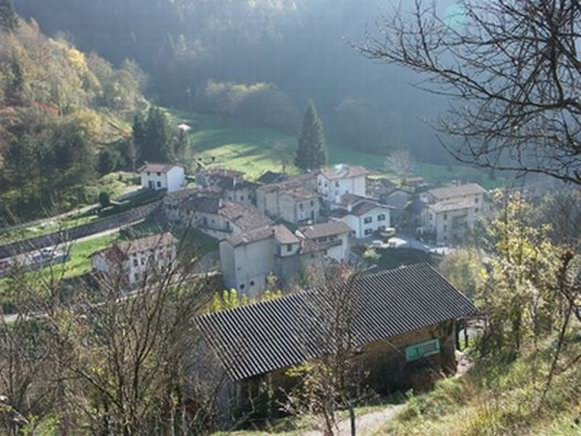
Peternel village

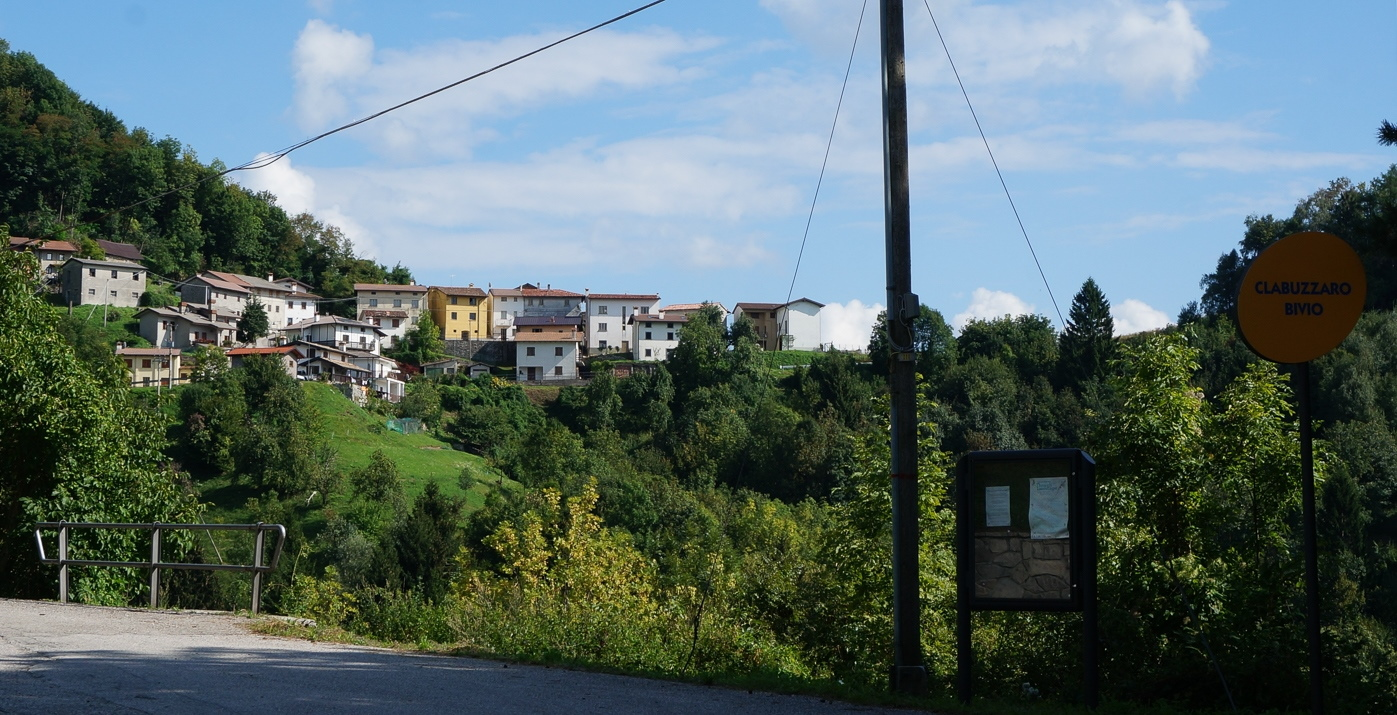
Clabuzzaro village

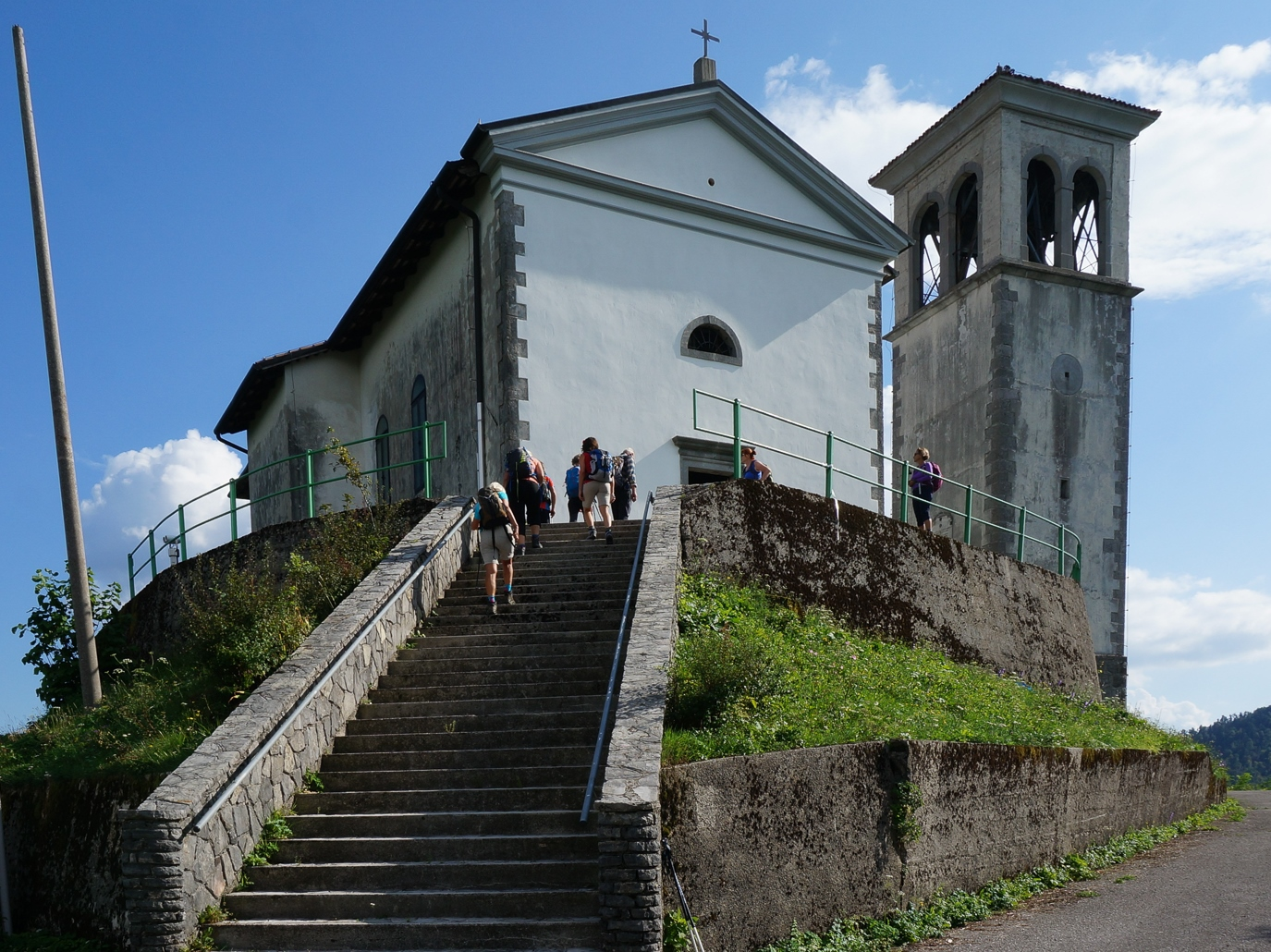
The church of San Volfango

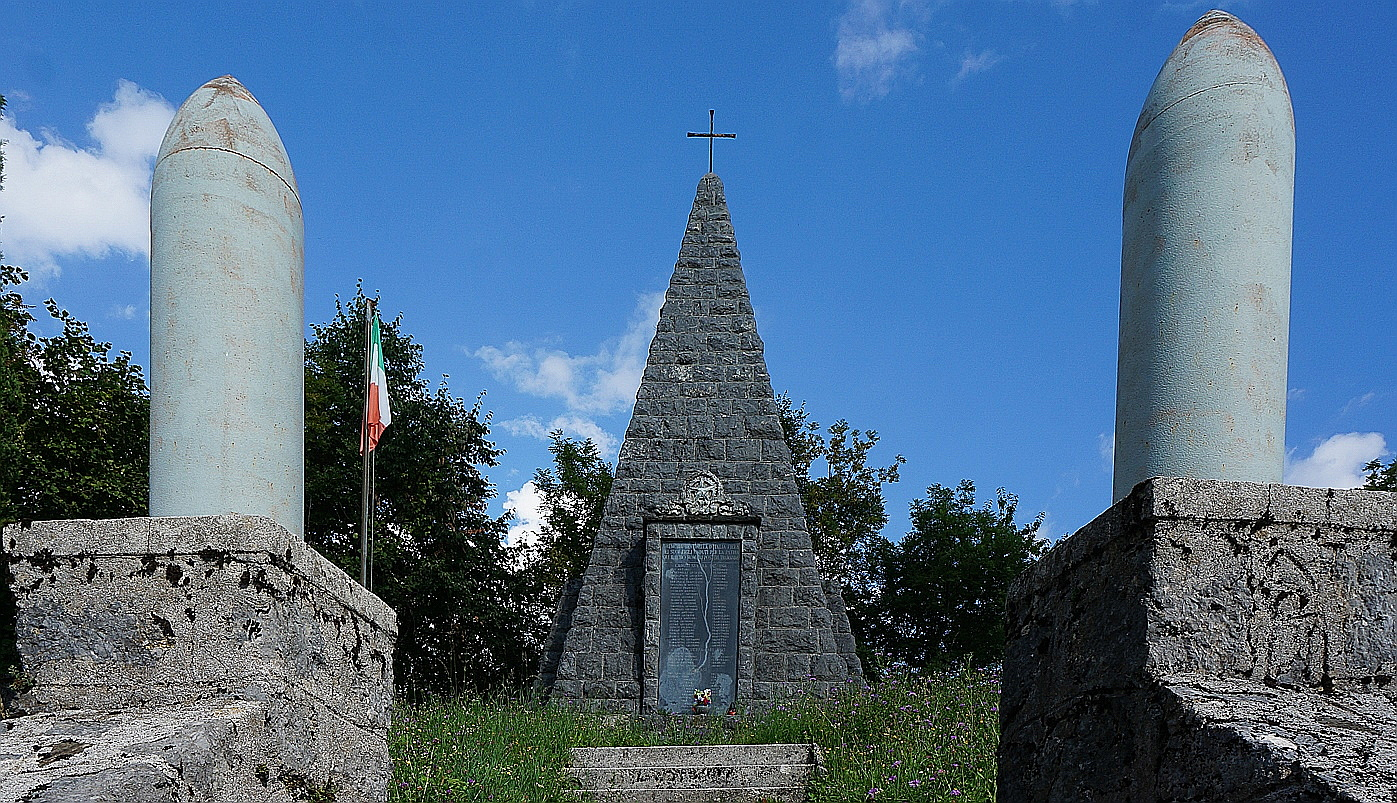
The war memorial of San Volfango

== See also ==
- Venetian Slovenia
- Friuli
- Slovene Lands
