= Grimacco =

Grimacco Garmak (Slovene) Grimac (Friulian)
- Comune
- Comune di Grimacco
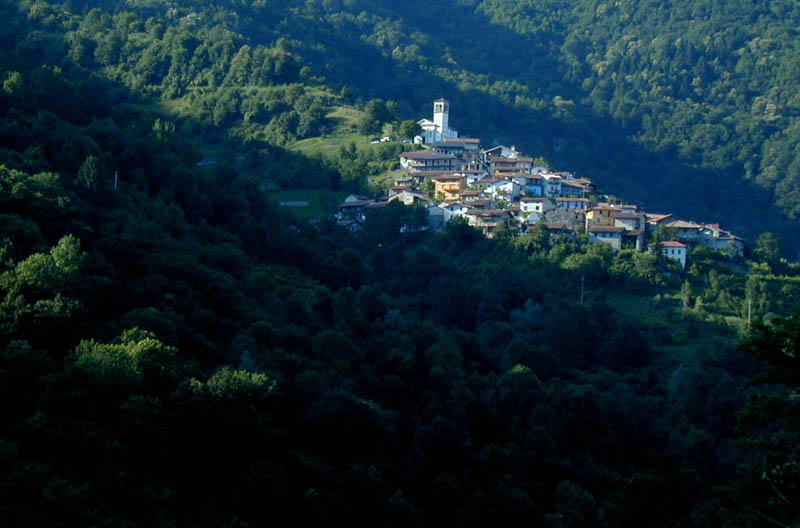
- The village of Topolò (Topolovo) in the municipality of Grimacco

- Location within Italy Location within Friuli-Venezia Giulia
- Coordinates: 46°9′N 13°34′E
- Country: Italy
- Region: Friuli-Venezia Giulia
- Province: Udine (UD)
- Frazioni: Brida superiore (Gorenje Bardo), Brida inferiore (Dolenje Bardo), Canalaz (Kanalac), Clodig (Hlodič), Costne (Hostne), Dolina (Dolina), Grimacco Inferiore (Dolenji Garmak), Grimacco Superiore (Gorenji Garmak), Liessa (Liesa), Lombai (Lombaj), Plataz (Platac), Podlach (Podlak), Seuza (Selce), Slapovicco (Slapovik), Sverinaz (Zverinac), Topolò (Topolove), Ville di Mezzo.

Government
  - Mayor: Eliana Fabello 25 May 2014 (Lista civica)

Area
  - Total: 16.4 km^{2} (6.3 sq mi)

Population (2015)
  - Total: 342
  - Density: 20.9/km^{2} (54.0/sq mi)
- Time zone: UTC+1 (CET)
  - Summer (DST): UTC+2 (CEST)
- Postal code: 33040
- Dialing code: 0432
- Patron saint: Valentine
- Saint day: 14 February
- Website: institutional website

Grimacco (Slovene: Garmak; Friulian: Grimac) is a comune (municipality) in the Regional decentralization entity of Udine in the Italian region Friuli-Venezia Giulia, located about 60 kilometres (37 mi) northwest of Trieste and about 25 kilometres (16 mi) northeast of Udine, on the border with Slovenia, and borders the following municipalities: Drenchia, Kanal ob Soči (Slovenia), Kobarid (Slovenia), San Leonardo, Savogna, Stregna.

Grimacco localities include Brida superiore (Gorenje Bardo), Brida inferiore (Dolenje Bardo), Canalaz (Kanalac), Clodig (Hlodič), Costne (Hostne), Dolina (Dolina), Grimacco Inferiore (Dolenji Garmak), Grimacco Superiore (Gorenji Garmak), Liessa (Liesa), Lombai (Lombaj), Plataz (Platac), Podlach (Podlak), Seuza (Selce), Slapovicco (Slapovik), Sverinaz (Zverinac), Topolò (Topolove), Ville di Mezzo. The municipal hall is located in Clodig.

As of 2015, it had a population of 342 and an area of 16.4 square kilometres (6.3 mi^{2}).

== Ethnic composition ==
93.7% of the population were Slovenes according to the 1971 census.

== Demographic evolution ==
Historical population

| Year | Pop. | ±% |
|---|---|---|
| 1861 | ? | — |
| 1871 | 1,587 | — |
| 1881 | 1,560 | −1.7% |
| 1901 | 1,570 | +0.6% |
| 1911 | 1,678 | +6.9% |

| Year | Pop. | ±% |
|---|---|---|
| 1921 | 1,780 | +6.1% |
| 1931 | 1,621 | −8.9% |
| 1936 | 1,543 | −4.8% |
| 1951 | 1,737 | +12.6% |
| 1961 | 1,645 | −5.3% |

| Year | Pop. | ±% |
|---|---|---|
| 1971 | 929 | −43.5% |
| 1981 | 766 | −17.5% |
| 1991 | 591 | −22.8% |
| 2001 | 488 | −17.4% |

Source: Data from ISTAT

== Gallery ==
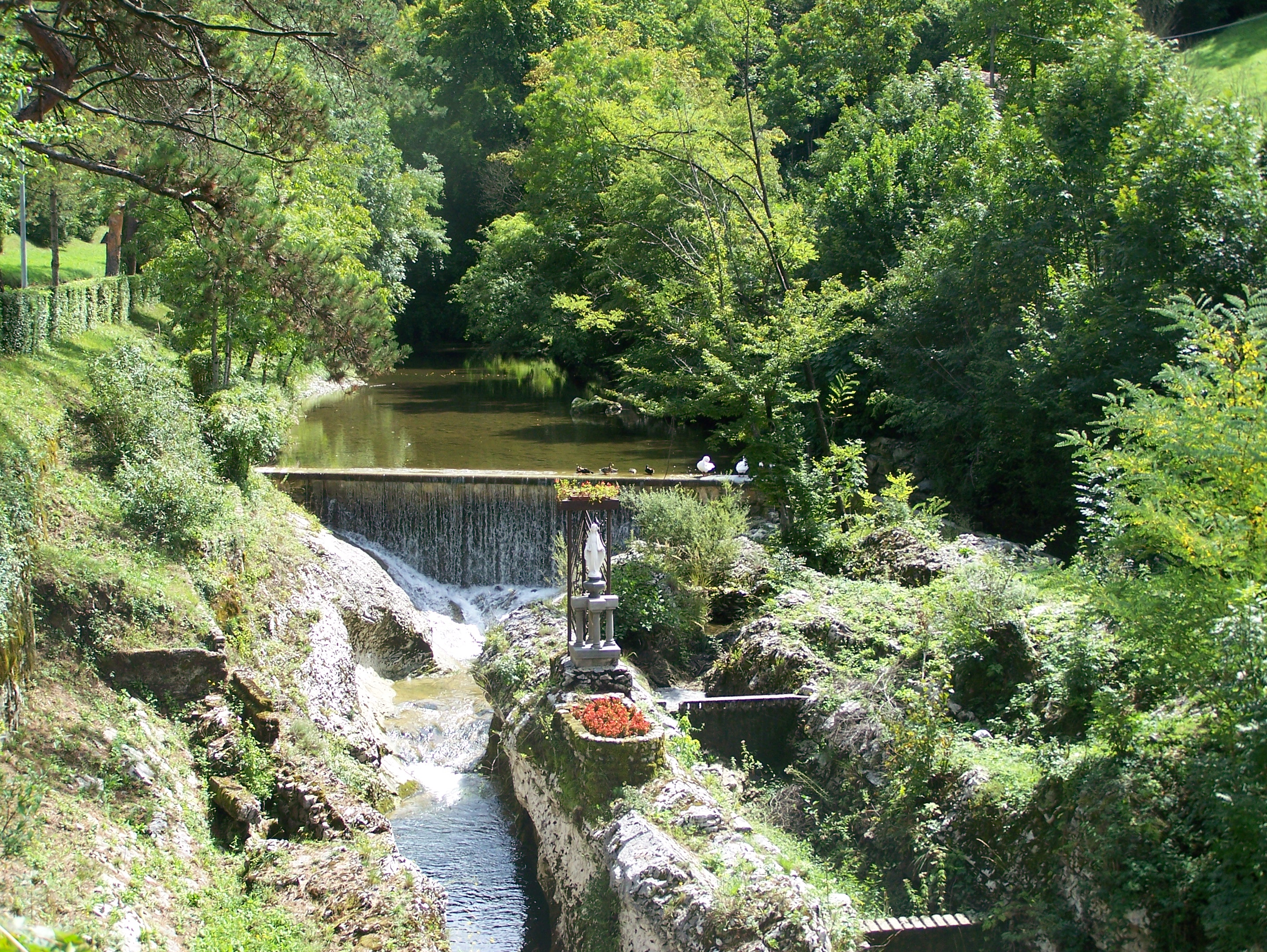
Torrent Rieca at Liessa

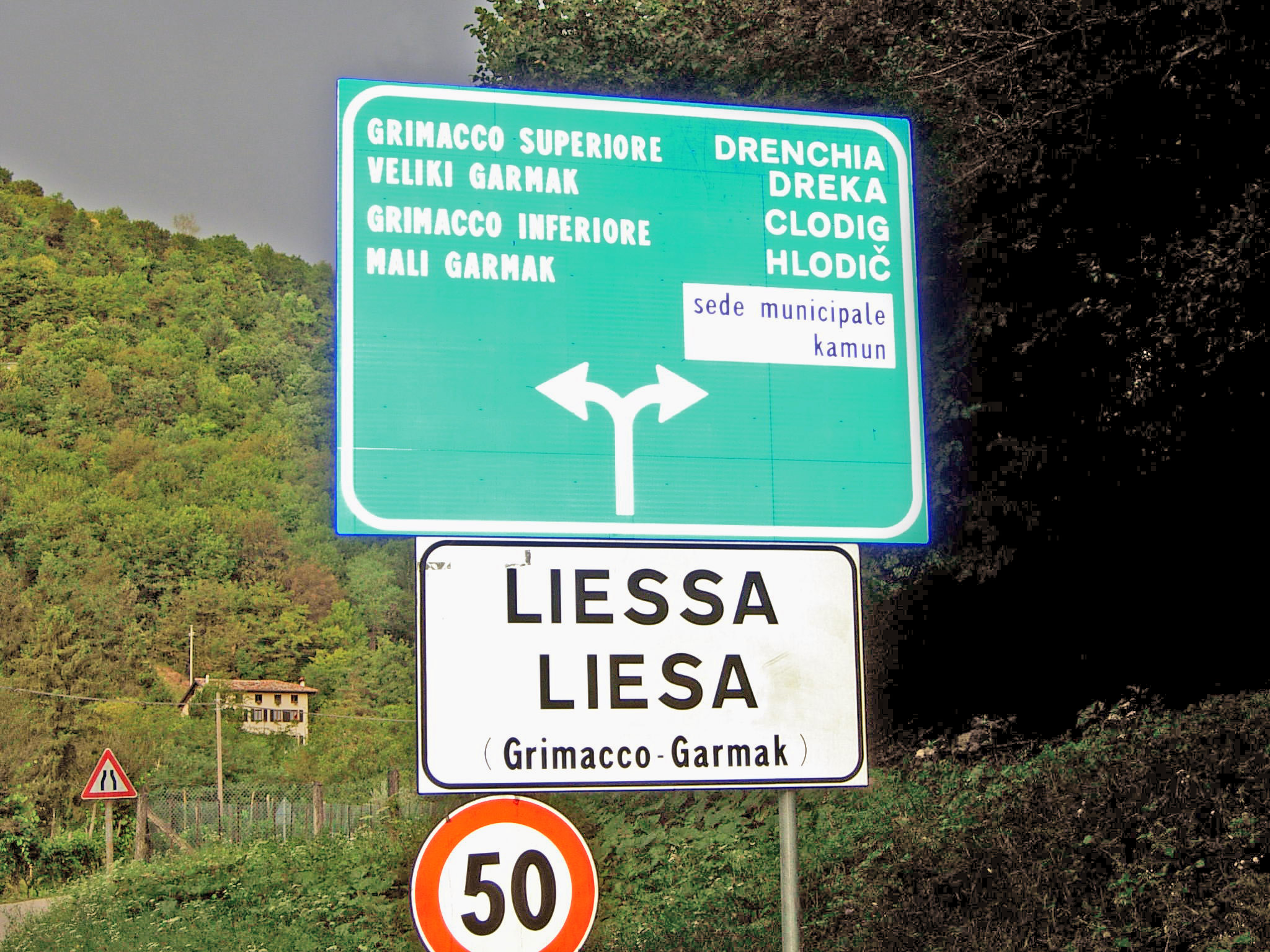
Italian-Slovene bilingualism in Grimacco, with the Slovene names written in the local dialect.

== See also ==
- Venetian Slovenia
- Friuli
- Slovene Lands
