= Prepotto =

Prepotto Prapotno (Slovene) Prapot (Friulian)
- Comune
- Comune di Prepotto
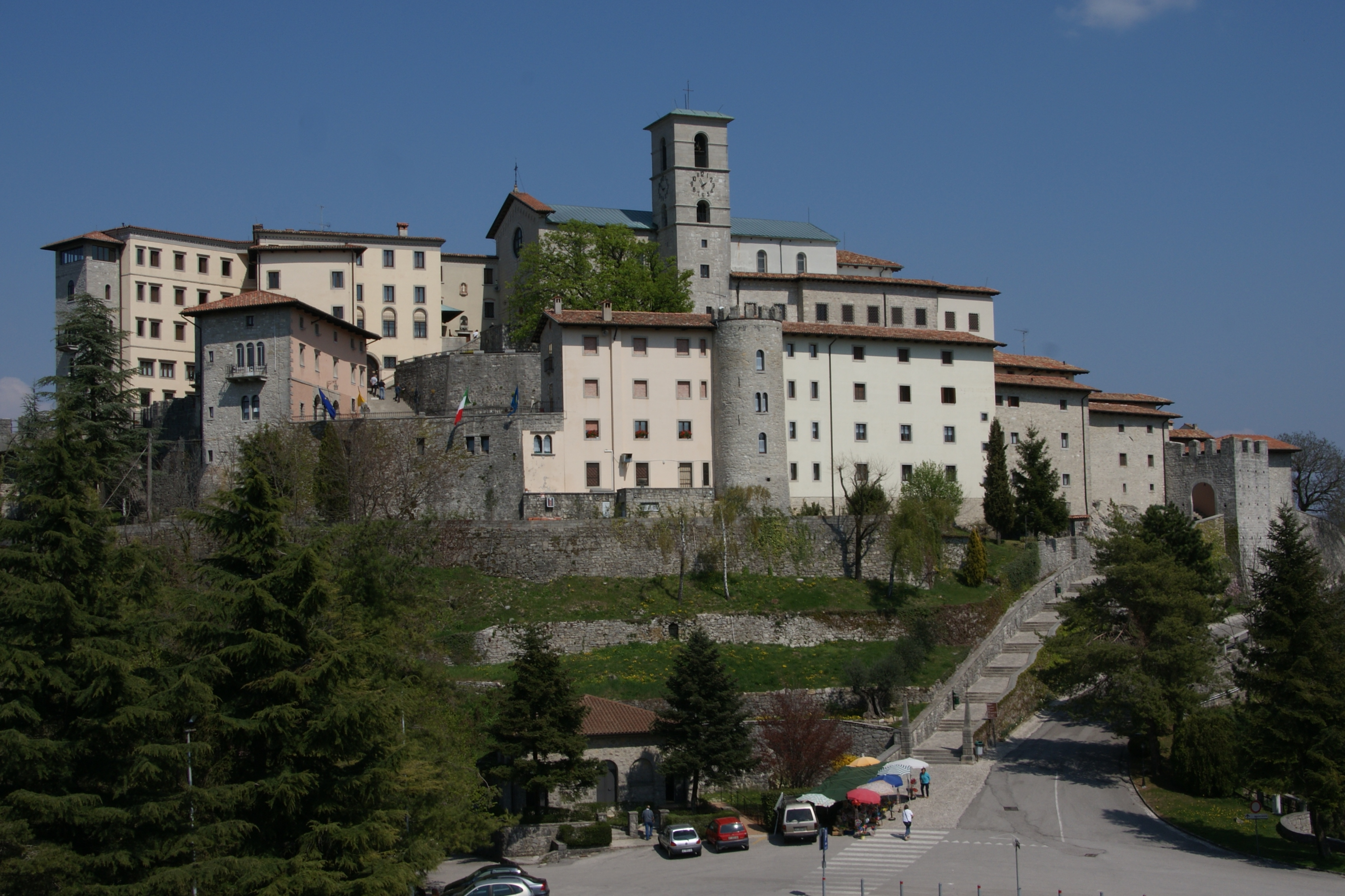
- The monastery of Castelmonte (Stara Gora) in Prepotto municipality

- Location within Italy Location within Friuli-Venezia Giulia
- Coordinates: 46°3′N 13°29′E
- Country: Italy
- Region: Friuli-Venezia Giulia
- Province: Udine (UD)

Area
  - Total: 33.2 km^{2} (12.8 sq mi)

Population (Dec. 2004)
  - Total: 894
  - Density: 26.9/km^{2} (69.7/sq mi)
- Time zone: UTC+1 (CET)
  - Summer (DST): UTC+2 (CEST)
- Postal code: 33040
- Dialing code: 0432

Prepotto (Slovene: Prapotno; Friulian: Prapot) is a comune (municipality) in the Regional decentralization entity of Udine in the Italian region of Friuli-Venezia Giulia, located about 50 kilometres (31 mi) northwest of Trieste and about 20 kilometres (12 mi) east of Udine, on the border with Slovenia. As of 31 December 2004, it had a population of 894 and an area of 33.2 square kilometres (12.8 mi^{2}).

Prepotto borders the following municipalities: Brda (Slovenia), Kanal ob Soči (Slovenia), Cividale del Friuli, Corno di Rosazzo, Dolegna del Collio, San Leonardo, San Pietro al Natisone, Stregna.

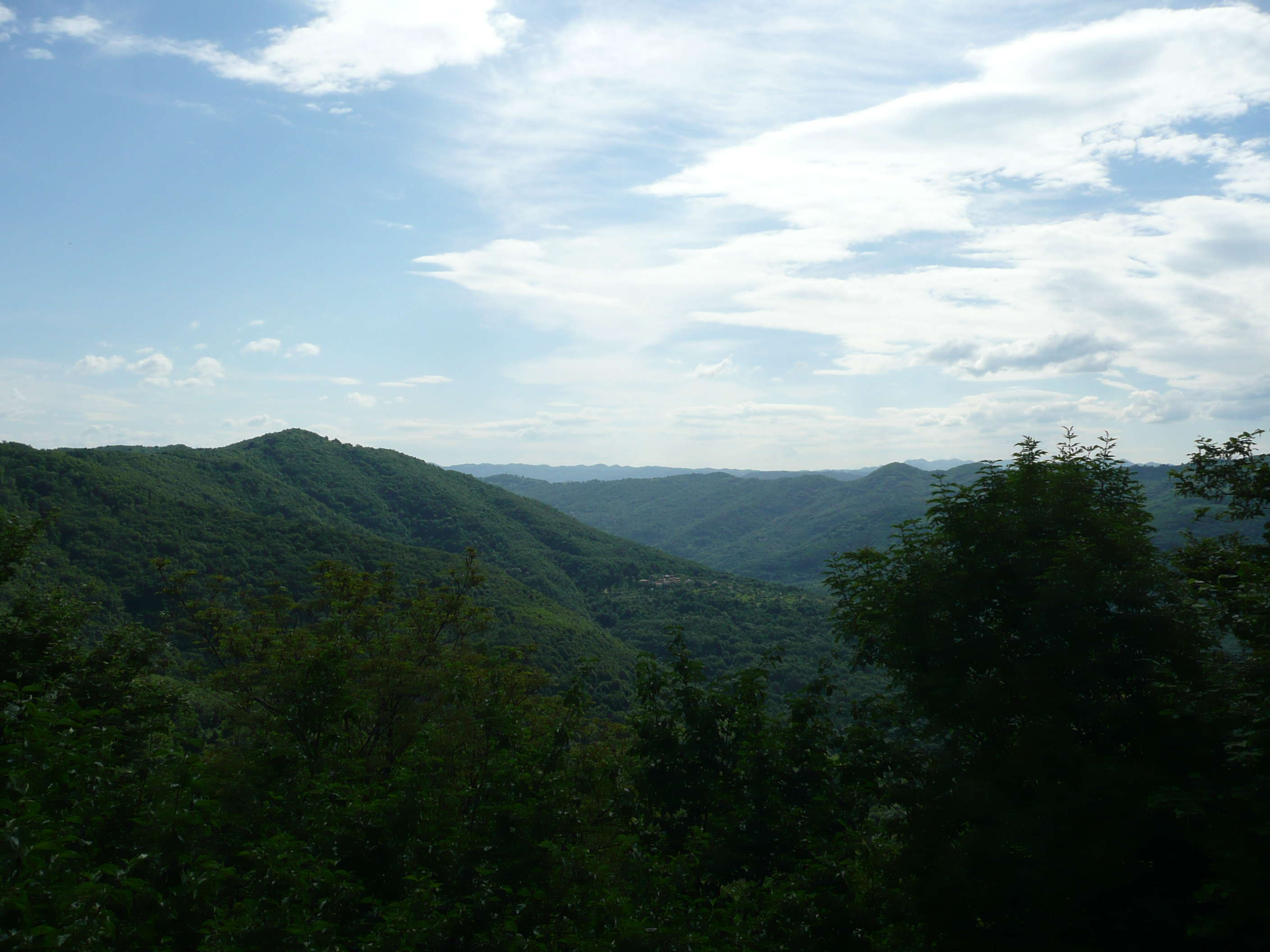
Prepotto

== Demographic evolution ==
Historical population

Year	Pop.	±%
1861	?	—
1871	2,011	—
1881	1,958	−2.6%
1901	2,247	+14.8%
1911	2,238	−0.4%

Year	Pop.	±%
1921	2,316	+3.5%
1931	2,142	−7.5%
1936	2,041	−4.7%
1951	2,036	−0.2%
1961	1,536	−24.6%

Year	Pop.	±%
1971	1,190	−22.5%
1981	1,065	−10.5%
1991	985	−7.5%
2001	899	−8.7%

Source: Data from ISTAT

== See also ==
- Venetian Slovenia
