= Savogna =

Savogna Sauodnja (Slovene) Savogne (Friulian)
- Comune
- Comune di Savogna
- Location within Italy Location within Friuli-Venezia Giulia
- Coordinates: 46°9′N 13°32′E
- Country: Italy
- Region: Friuli-Venezia Giulia
- Province: Udine (UD)
- Frazioni: Barza/Barca, Blasin/Blažin, Brizza di Sopra/Gorenje Barca, Brizza di Sotto/Dolenje Barca, Cepletischis/Čeplešišče, Crisnaro/Kranjac, Dus/Duš, Fletta/Fleta, Franz/Franci, Gabrovizza/Gabruca, Iellina/Jelina, Ieronizza/Jeronišče, Losaz/Ložac, Masseris/Mašera, Montemaggiore/Matajur, Pechinie di Sopra/Gorenje Pečnije, Pechinie di Sotto/Dolenje Pečnije, Podar, Podoreg/Podorieh, Polava, Savogna/Sauodnja, Stefenig/Stiefinči, Stermizza/Starmica, Tercimonte/Tarčmun

Government
  - Mayor: Germano Cendou (civic list)

Area
  - Total: 22.1 km^{2} (8.5 sq mi)
- Elevation: 235 m (771 ft)

Population (Dec. 2011)
  - Total: 490
  - Density: 22/km^{2} (57/sq mi)
- Time zone: UTC+1 (CET)
  - Summer (DST): UTC+2 (CEST)
- Postal code: 33040
- Dialing code: 0432
- Patron saint: Hermagoras and Fortunatus
- Saint day: July 12
- Website: Institutional website

Savogna (Slovene: Sovodnje, locally Sauodnja; Friulian: Savogne) is a comune (municipality) in the Regional decentralization entity of Udine in the Italian region of Friuli-Venezia Giulia, located about 60 kilometres (37 mi) northwest of Trieste and about 25 kilometres (16 mi) northeast of Udine, on the border with Slovenia.

Savogna localities include: Barza/Barca, Blasin/Blažin, Brizza di Sopra/Gorenje Barca, Brizza di Sotto/Dolenje Barca, Cepletischis/Čeplešišče, Crisnaro/Kranjac, Dus/Duš, Fletta/Fleta, Franz/Franci, Gabrovizza/Gabruca, Iellina/Jelina, Ieronizza/Jeronišče, Losaz/Ložac, Masseris/Mašera, Montemaggiore/Matajur, Pechinie di Sopra/Gorenje Pečnije, Pechinie di Sotto/Dolenje Pečnije, Podar, Podoreg/Podorieh, Polava, Savogna/Sauodnja, Stefenig/Stiefinči, Stermizza/Starmica, Tercimonte/Tarčmun.

As of 31 December 2011, it had a population of 490 and an area of 22.1 square kilometres (8.5 mi^{2}). According to the census 1971 77.2% of the population are Slovenes.

Savogna borders the following municipalities: Kobarid (Slovenia), Grimacco, Pulfero, San Leonardo, San Pietro al Natisone.

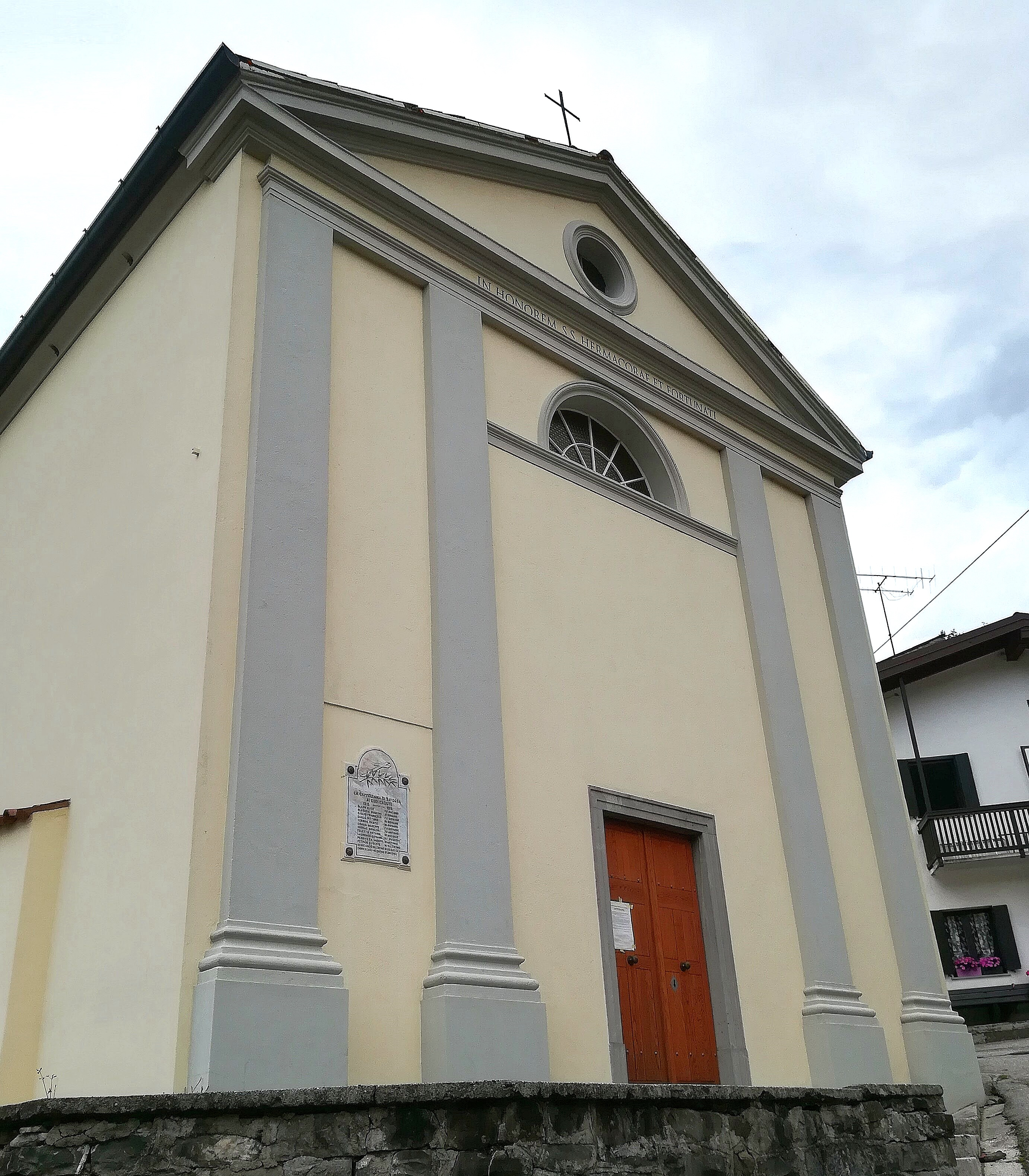
The parish church of Savogna

== Demographic evolution ==
Historical population

Year	Pop.	±%
1861	?	—
1871	1,889	—
1881	2,017	+6.8%
1901	2,078	+3.0%
1911	2,026	−2.5%

Year	Pop.	±%
1921	2,143	+5.8%
1931	2,044	−4.6%
1936	1,867	−8.7%
1951	2,077	+11.2%
1961	1,741	−16.2%

Year	Pop.	±%
1971	1,226	−29.6%
1981	1,029	−16.1%
1991	786	−23.6%
2001	659	−16.2%

Source: Data from ISTAT

== See also ==
- Venetian Slovenia
- Friuli
- Slovene Lands
