= Stregna =

Stregna Sriednje (Slovene) Stregne (Friulian)
- Comune
- Comune di Stregna
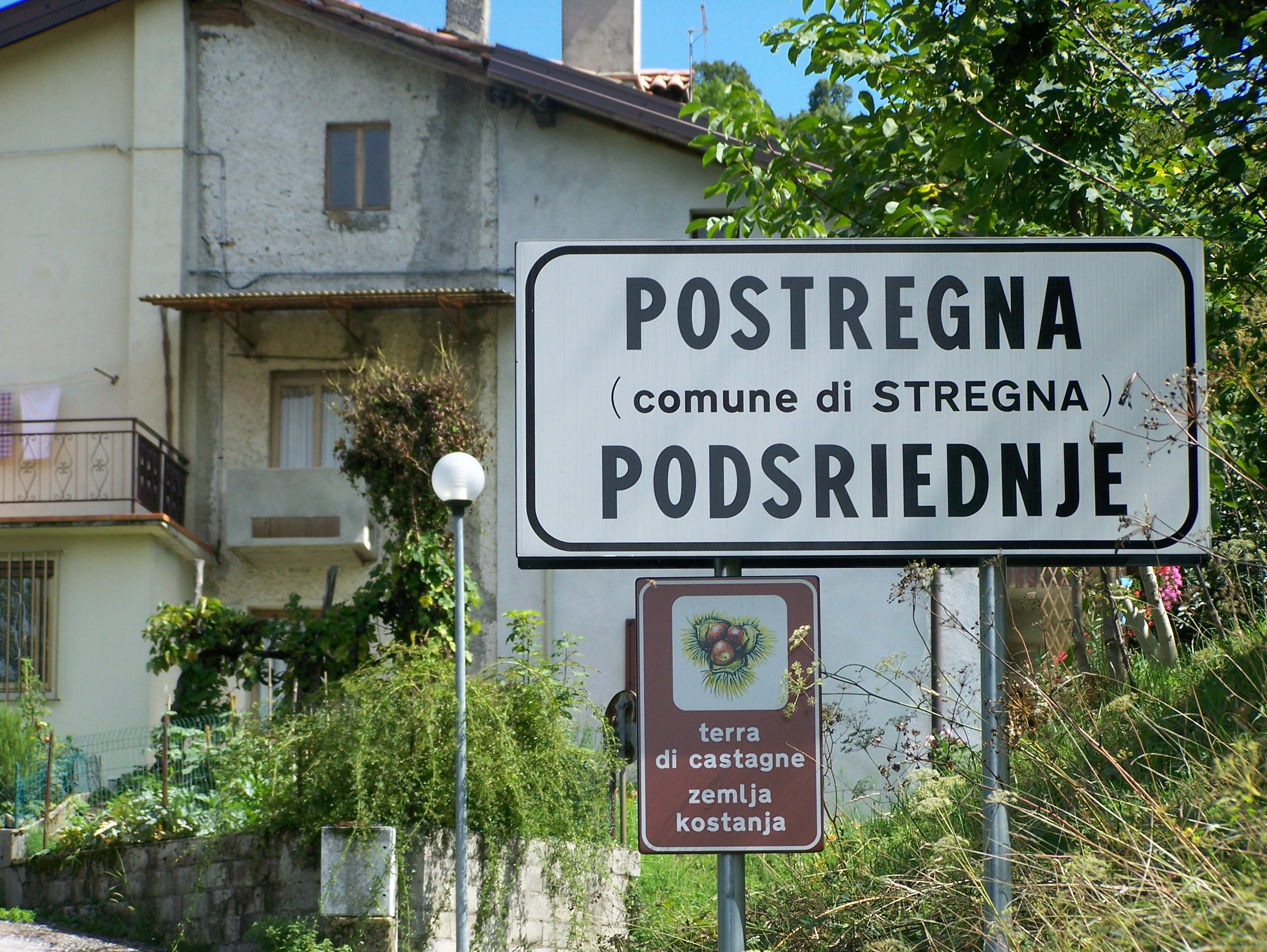
- Bilingual Italian-Slovene signs in Stregna

- Location within Italy Location within Friuli-Venezia Giulia
- Coordinates: 46°8′N 13°35′E
- Country: Italy
- Region: Friuli-Venezia Giulia
- Province: Udine (UD)
- Frazioni: Baiar (Bajar), Cernetig (Černeče), Clinaz (Klinac), Cobilza (Kobilca), Dughe (Duge), Gnidovizza (Gnjiduca), Oblizza (Oblica), Podgora (Podgora), Polizza (Polica), Ponte Clinaz (Klinški Malin), Postregna (Podsriednje), Presserie (Preserje), Raune (Raune), Saligoi (Šalguje), Tribil Inferiore (Dolenji Tarbij), Tribil Superiore (Gorenji Tarbij), Urataca, Varch (Varh) e Zamir (Zamir).

Government
  - Mayor: Luca Postregna (Lista civica)

Area
  - Total: 19.7 km^{2} (7.6 sq mi)
- Elevation: 404 m (1,325 ft)

Population (Dec. 2011)
  - Total: 404
  - Density: 20.5/km^{2} (53.1/sq mi)
- Time zone: UTC+1 (CET)
  - Summer (DST): UTC+2 (CEST)
- Postal code: 33040
- Dialing code: 0432
- Patron saint: Conversion of Paul the Apostle (St. Pauls' Day)
- Saint day: 25 January
- Website: Official website

Stregna (Slovene: Srednje, locally Sriednje; Friulian: Stregne) is a comune (municipality) in the Regional decentralization entity of Udine in the Italian region of Friuli-Venezia Giulia, located about 60 kilometres (37 mi) northwest of Trieste and about 30 kilometres (19 mi) northeast of Udine, on the border with Slovenia, and borders the following municipalities: Grimacco, Kanal ob Soči (Slovenia), San Leonardo, and Prepotto. The name of the settlement comes from the Slovene word srednje, meaning "the middle one".

Stregna localities (frazioni) include:

- villages: Cernetig (Černeče), Clinaz (Klinac), Dughe (Duge), Gnidovizza (Gnjiduca), Oblizza (Oblica), Podgora (Podgora), Polizza (Polica), Postregna (Podsriednje), Presserie (Preserje), Raune (Raune), Saligoi (Šalguje), Tribil Inferiore (Dolenji Tarbij), Tribil Superiore (Gorenji Tarbij), Varch (Varh) e Zamir (Zamir);
- suburbs: Baiar (Bajar), Cobilza (Kobilca), Melina (Melina), Ponte Clinaz (Klinški Malin) e Urataca.

As of 31 December 2004, it had a population of 434 and an area of 19.7 square kilometres (7.6 mi^{2}).

== Ethnic composition ==
82.7% of the population were Slovenes according to the 1971 census.

== Demographic evolution ==
Historical population

Year	Pop.	±%
1861	?	—
1871	1,647	—
1881	1,710	+3.8%
1901	1,805	+5.6%
1911	2,000	+10.8%

Year	Pop.	±%
1921	1,908	−4.6%
1931	1,908	+0.0%
1936	1,722	−9.7%
1951	1,883	+9.3%
1961	1,554	−17.5%

Year	Pop.	±%
1971	952	−38.7%
1981	731	−23.2%
1991	538	−26.4%
2001	456	−15.2%

Source: Data from ISTAT
