= Chiusaforte =

Chiusaforte Kluže (Slovene) Sclûse (Friulian)
- Comune
- Comune di Chiusaforte
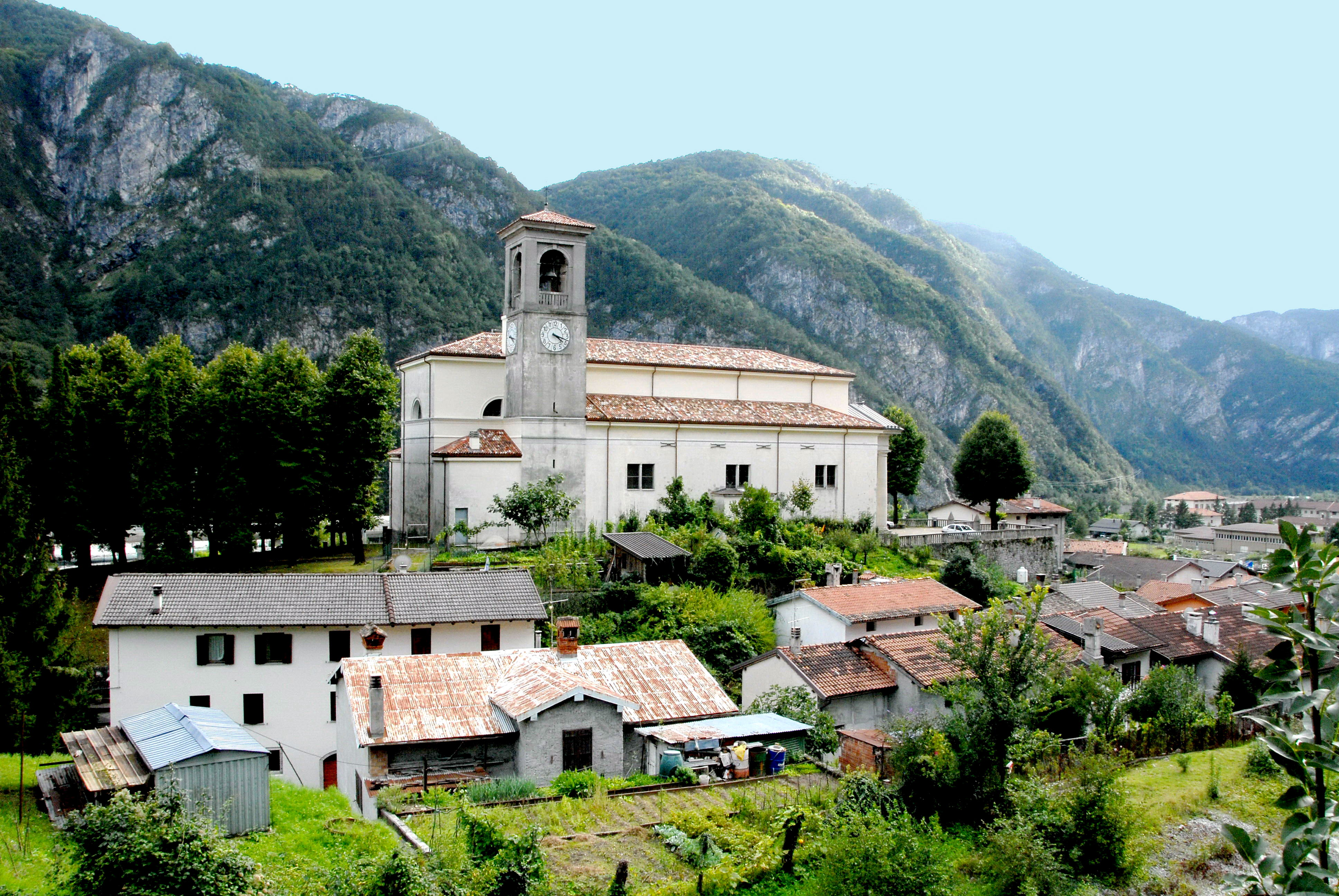

- Location of the municipality of Chiusaforte in the former province of Udine

- Location within Italy Location within Friuli-Venezia Giulia
- Coordinates: 46°24′N 13°19′E
- Country: Italy
- Region: Friuli-Venezia Giulia
- Province: Udine (UD)
- Frazioni: Costamolino e Sella Nevea

Government
  - Mayor: Fabrizio Fuccaro

Area
  - Total: 100.6 km^{2} (38.8 sq mi)
- Elevation: 391 m (1,283 ft)

Population (31 October 2025)
  - Total: 580
  - Density: 5.8/km^{2} (15/sq mi)
- Demonym: Chiusani
- Time zone: UTC+1 (CET)
  - Summer (DST): UTC+2 (CEST)
- Postal code: 33010
- Dialing code: 0433
- Website: Municipality of Chiusaforte

Chiusaforte (Slovene: Kluže; German: Klausen; Friulian: Sclûse) is a comune (municipality) in the Regional decentralization entity of Udine in the Italian region of Friuli-Venezia Giulia.

== Geography ==
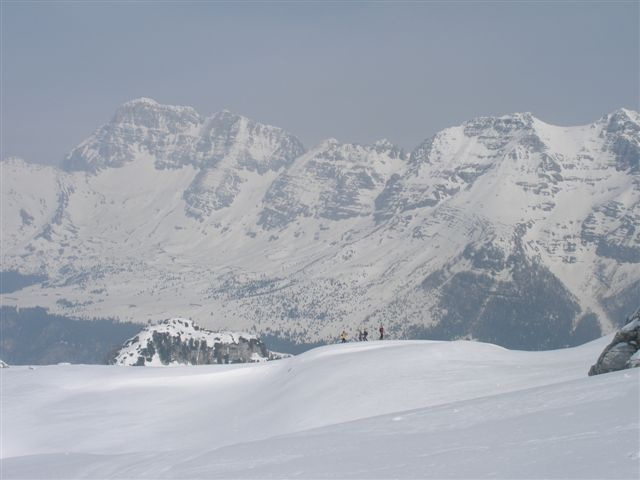
the Jôf di Montasio from Kanin Mountains

It is located about 90 kilometres (56 mi) northwest of Trieste and about 40 kilometres (25 mi) north of Udine, on the border with Slovenia. Chiusaforte is situated in the Canal del Ferro valley of the Fella River, running between the Carnic and Julian Alps to its confluence with the Tagliamento.

Chiusaforte borders the following municipalities: Dogna, Malborghetto Valbruna, Moggio Udinese, Bovec (Slovenia), Resia, Resiutta, Tarvisio.

The Fella Valley is the site of Pontebbana railway line from Udine to Tarvisio and the Austrian border. It is also traversed by the parallel Italian Autostrada A23 highway from Palmanova to Tarvisio.

== History ==
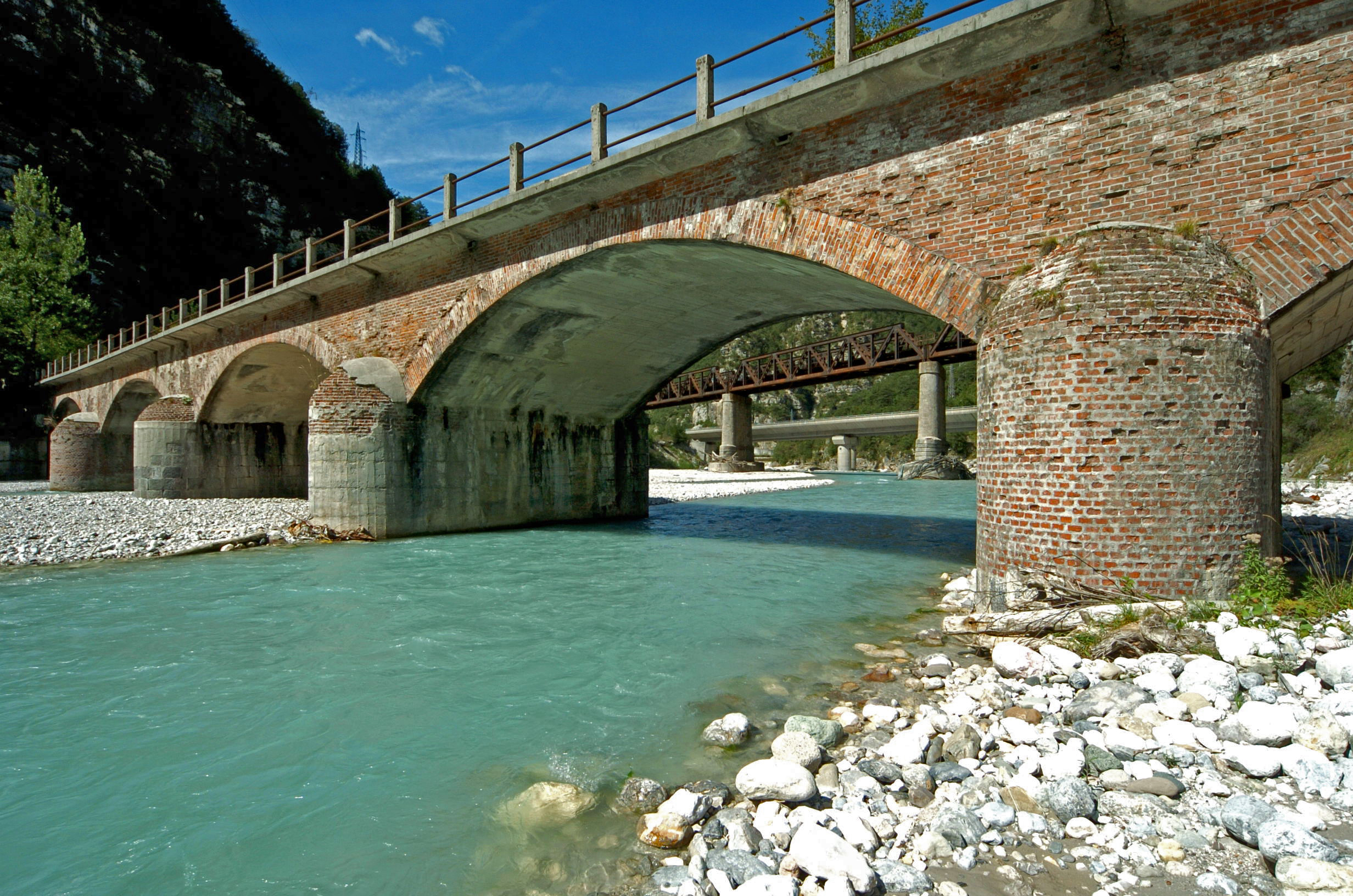
Road and railway bridges crossing the Fella River

The narrow valley probably had been the site of a Roman Road from Italy to the Noricum province. Ulric von Eppenstein, Patriarch of Aquileia (1086–1121) had a fortress erected to charge tolls to travellers crossing the Alps. The Patriarchs had to defend their territory against the claims raised by the Counts of Görz and the Dukes of Carinthia, until in 1420 the Republic of Venice conquered the Fella Valley up to Pontebba and incorporated it into the Domini di Terraferma.

Annexed by the Habsburg monarchy according to the 1797 Treaty of Campo Formio it was part of the Austrian Kingdom of Lombardy–Venetia from 1815, until it fell with Venetia to the newly established Kingdom of Italy according to the 1866 Treaty of Vienna.

== Infrastructure and transport ==
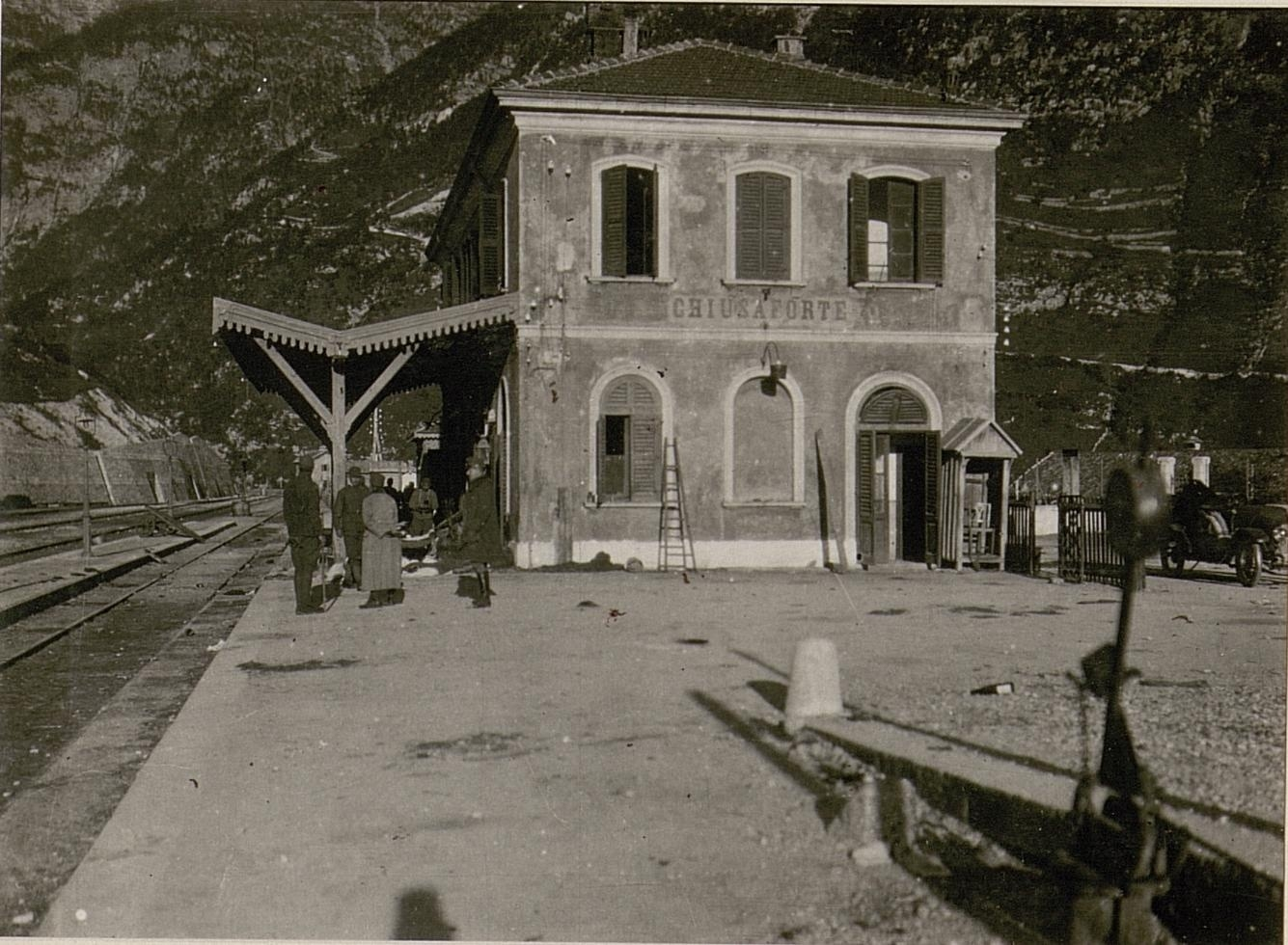
Chiusaforte station in 1917

=== Railways ===
From 1878 to 1995 Chiusaforte was crossed by the Udine-Tarvisio Railway where the Chiusaforte Station was located. It was decommissioned in 1995 following the doubling of the line; the route was converted to the Alpe Adria cycle paths, while the passenger building there is used for other purposes.

The former Chiusaforte railway station, owned by RFI, has been transformed into a seasonal logistics hub for the cycle tourists

== Gallery ==
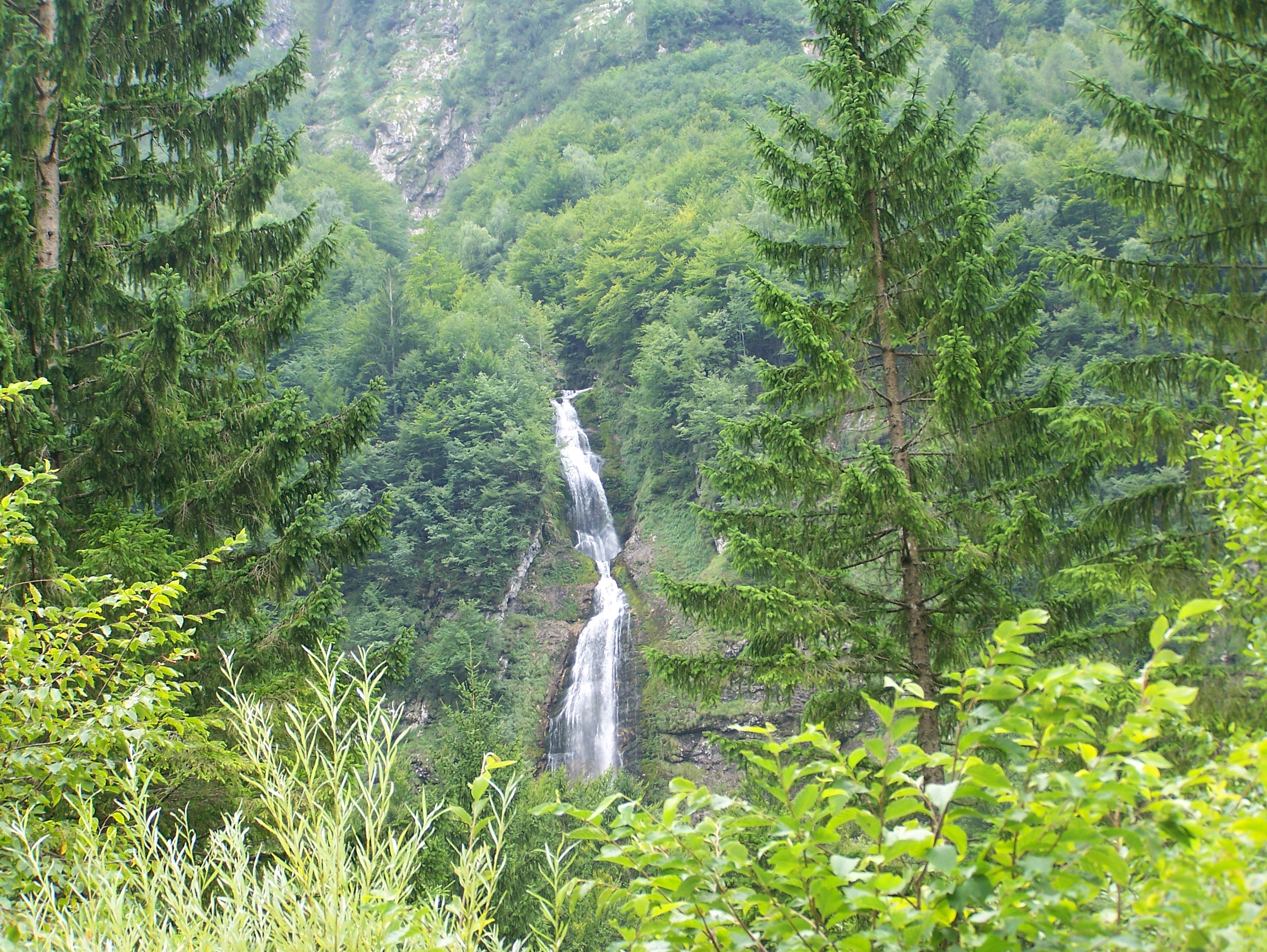
The Fontanon di Goriuda in the Raccolana Valley

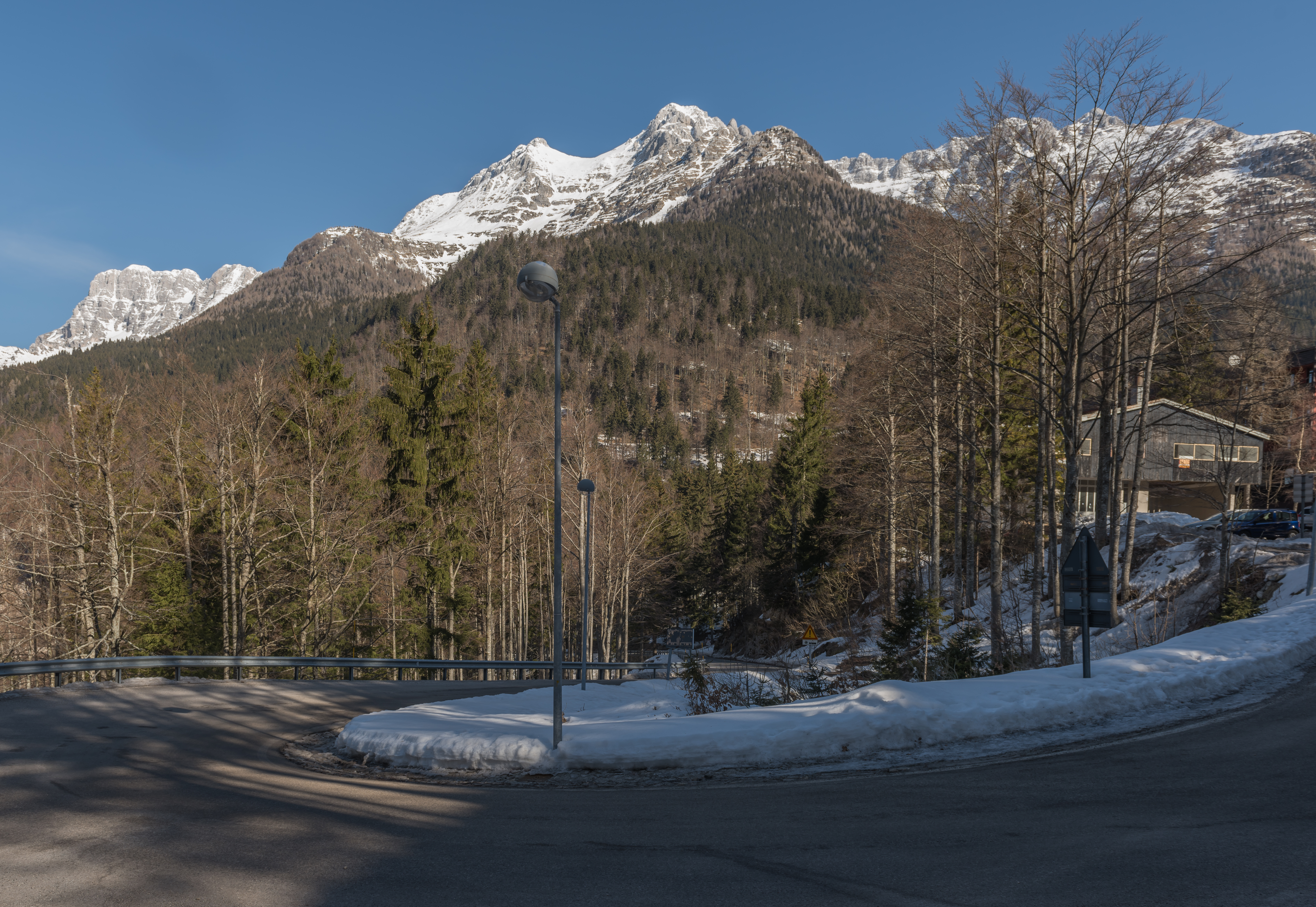
Sella Nevea, with the Jôf Fuârt-Montasio chain in the background

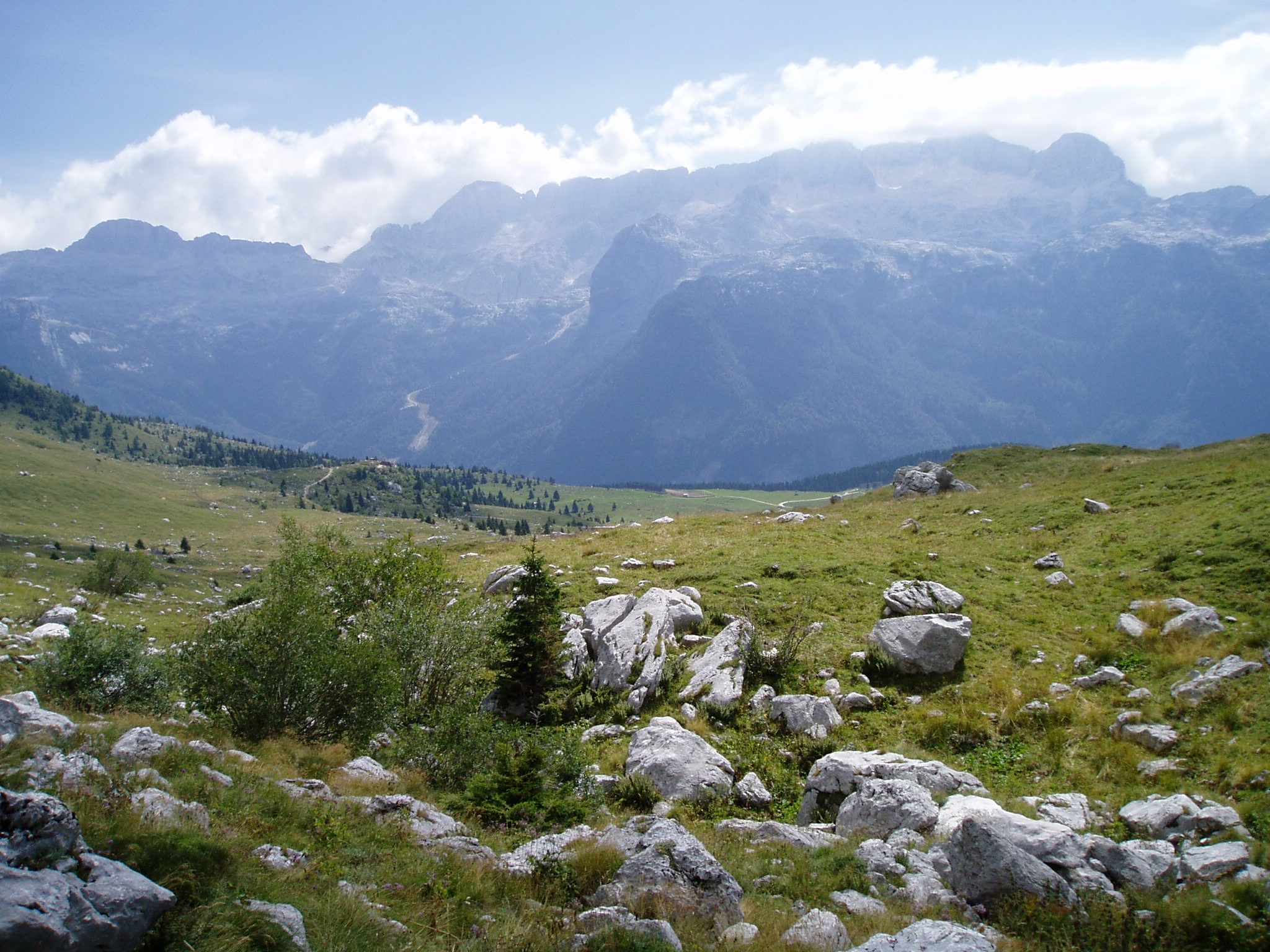
Monte Canin seen from the Montasio Plateau

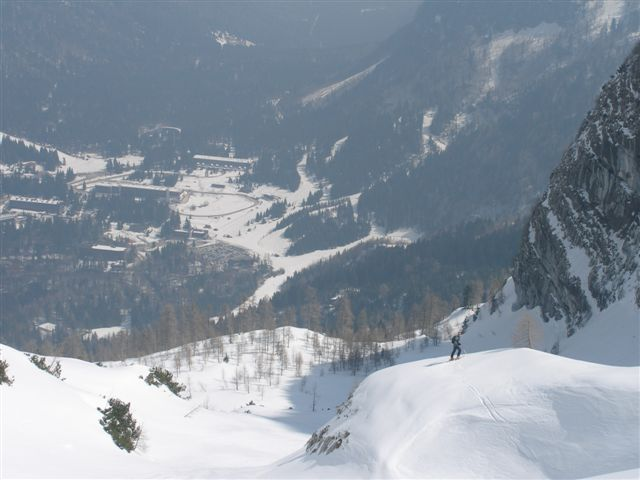
The hamlet of Sella Nevea from Monte Canin
