= Moggessa di Là =

Human settlement in Italy

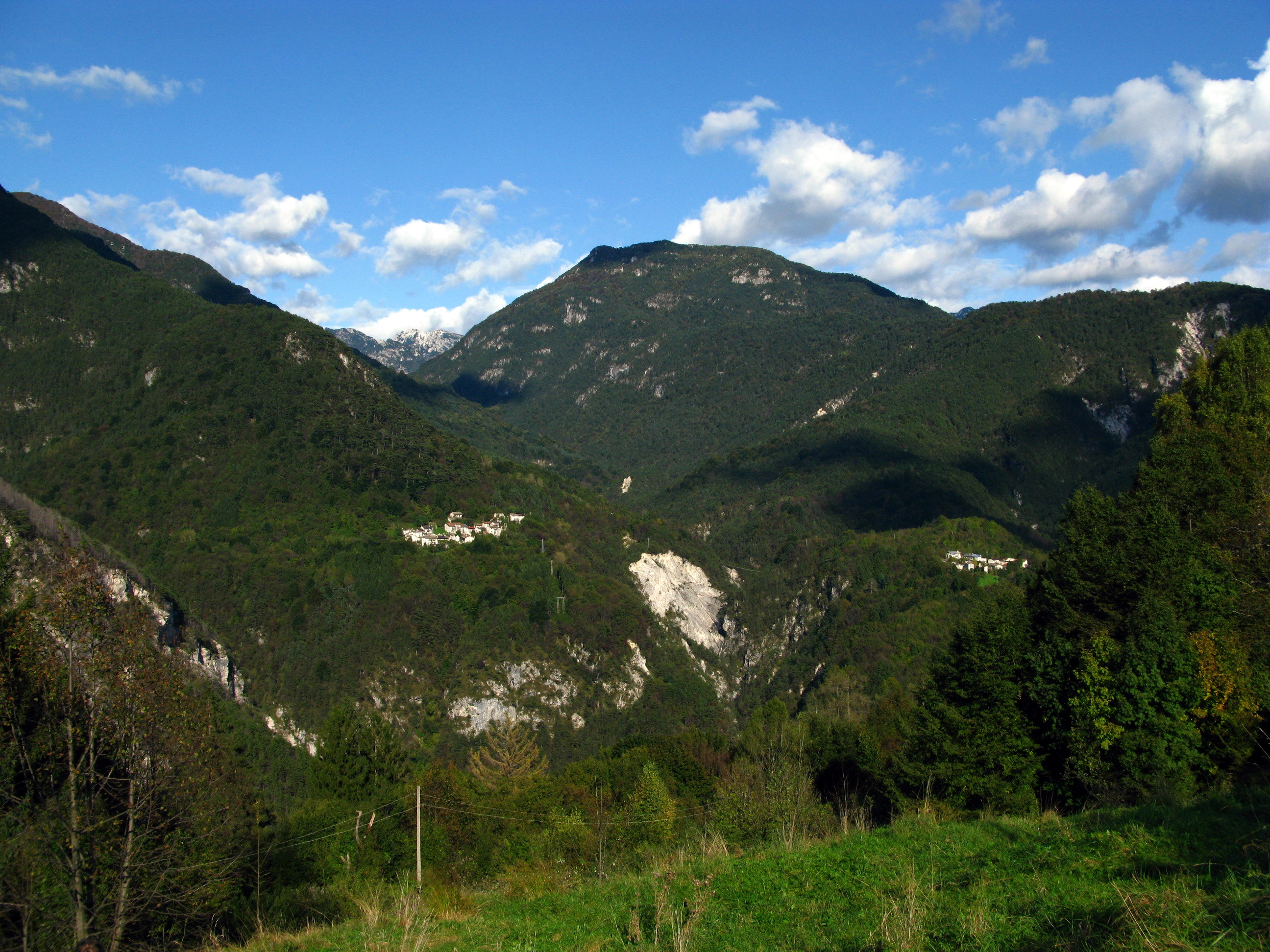
Moggessa di Là (left side) and Moggessa di Qua seen from Stavoli.

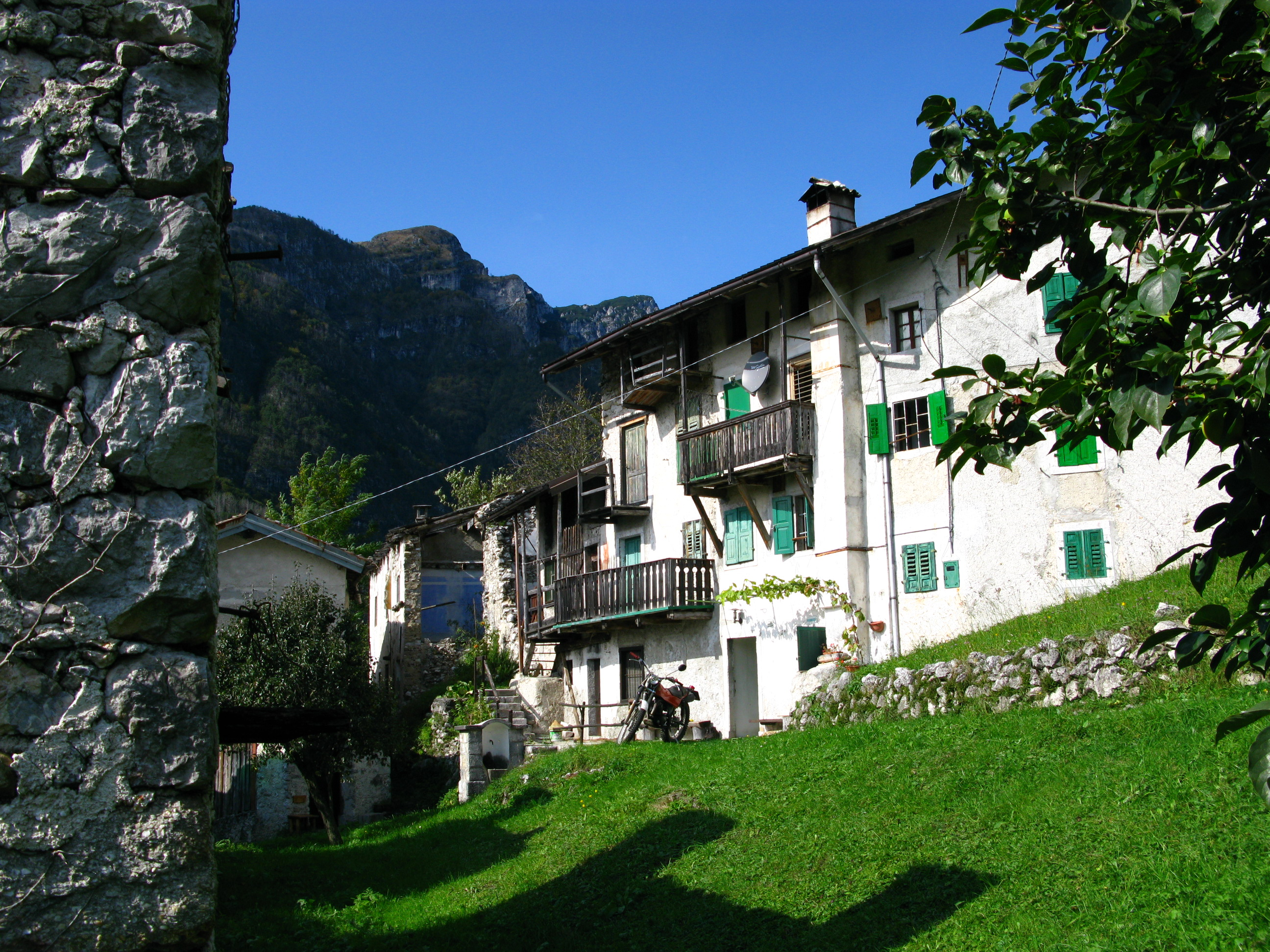

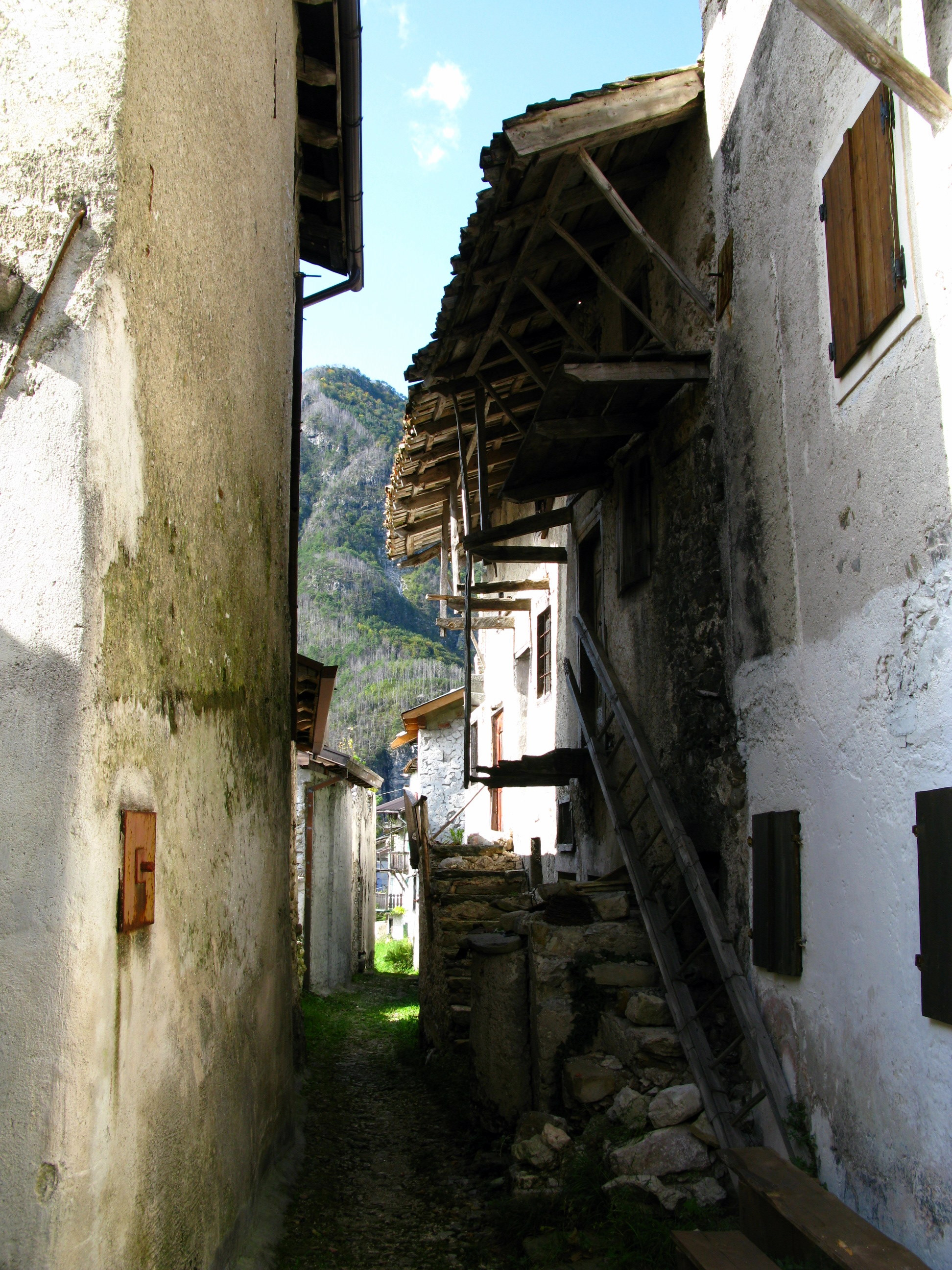
Alleyway in Moggessa di Là.

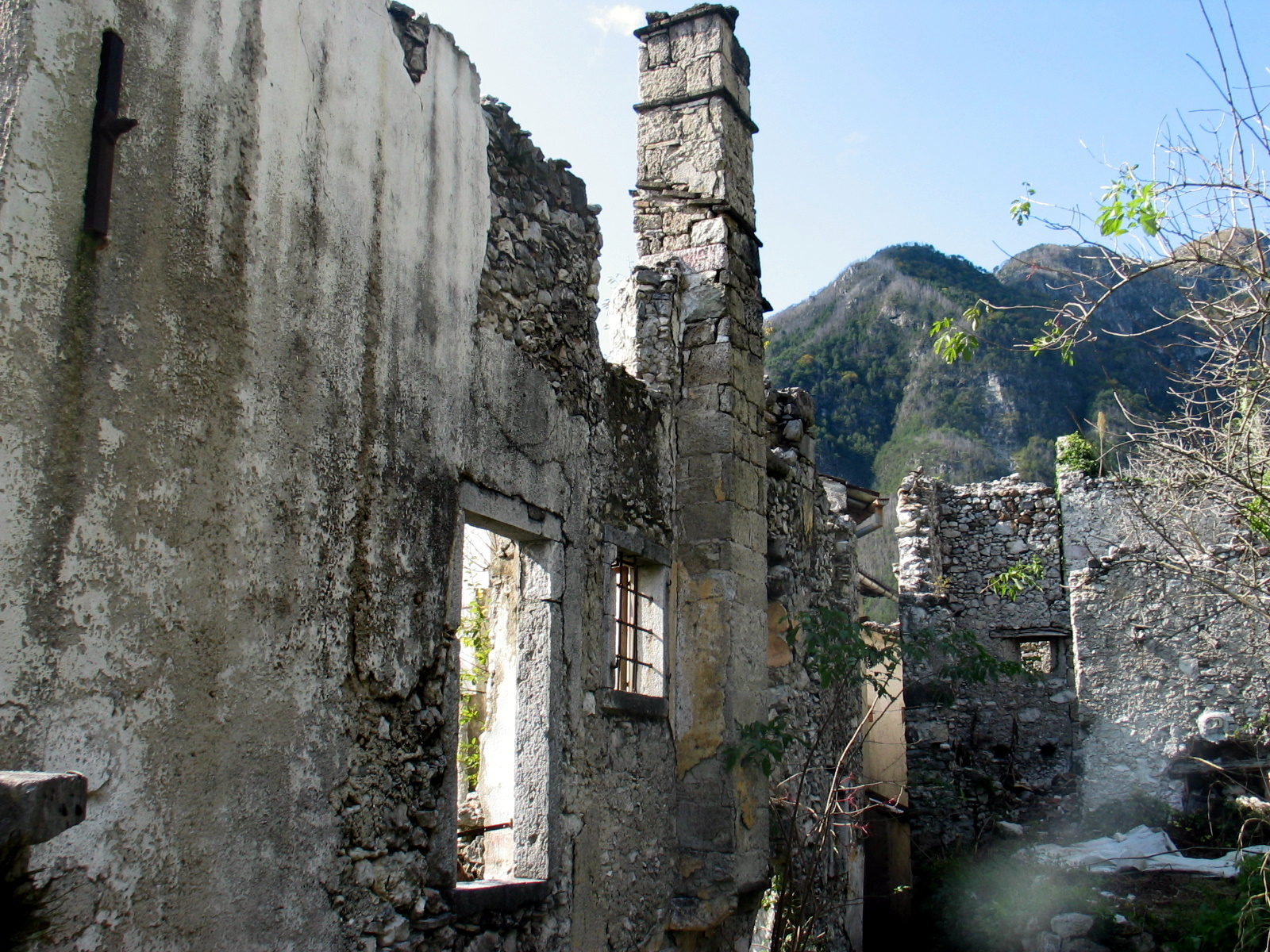
Dilapidated house.

Moggessa di Là is an abandoned and partly dilapidated northern Italian peasant village with no access road in the Carnic Alps west of Moggio Udinese in the Province of Udine. The second part of the hamlet, Moggessa di Qua, and the neighboring village Stavoli also have no road access. Moggessa Di Là can be reached by a two-hour walk starting from Moggio Udinese, which is located on the A23 motorway.

The name is in Friulian Muiesse di Là, in German Klein-Mossach jenseits (meaning "Little Moos beyond"), referring to a medieval foundation of the monastery in Moggio. Despite the altitude of 530 meters above sea level, the area is suited for growing vegetables. The microclimate at the foot of Monte Palevierte (at 1,785 metres above the Adriatic / 5,856 ft) is very mild. Since there are no access roads, the village is accessible only by mule tracks. A path leads from Moggio Udinese to Moggessa di Qua that crosses the gorge of Molin brook after about two hours from the village. In the gorge are the last remnants of the mill to see, which was in operation until 1962 and was almost completely destroyed by an earthquake in 1976.

The trail between the settlements is unlike after Moggio down, less steep and in better condition, so that you can communicate between the two villages via dirt bike. From the other side Moggessa di Là is after an hour walking time via a steep narrow road and a river crossing (there is no bridge) of Stavoli from accessing. Stavoli is another mountain village with no access road.

At the entrance of Moggessa di Là is a small Catholic church. A cemetery does not exist, however. Particularly appealing are the narrow alleyways, where the farmhouses are concentrated in a small space. The relatively high-built houses and partly ruined buildings are very close together. In between, often extend only a few meters wide streets. The clear overgrown fields lie below the village.

In the early 20th century, the inhabitants lived largely autonomously as self-caterers. In the winding core, take several cobbled streets together. Five houses were inhabited by 2008, but not all year. At the lower edge where the fields begin is the largest and most striking house, an old craftsman house. It has two superimposed arcades whose lower arches are open. Two others still preserved show brick arches of a ruined house near that, so this style element was used here more often. Until 1960 there was in this village here even a school.

As in neighboring villages, there are also many examples of rural, reduced to essentials architecture, which is characteristic of this poor mountain area. The houses, all of them made of stone, are unexpectedly high, with up to four stories. In the middle of the villages there are common wells. Many of the wooden balconies on the south side have already expired. Typical are also, outside of the houses, fireplaces (Friulian: fogolâre). The wreck of a cultivator shows that there was still motorized farm equipment used, before people moved away.

The very solitary life in the mountains, especially in winter, was a little lighter when water pipes and electricity came to the village. Due to the strong 1976 earthquake with the epicenter in Venzone, many houses in the village were destroyed. They are gradually being overgrown by bushes. Emergency quarters in containers were not possible because of the missing street. Today some of the lapsed houses are being restored by the descendants of that time, moved-away villagers, and inhabitants during the holidays.

The six-hour hike through the three Carnic villages Moggessa di Qua, Moggessa di Là, and Stavoli, all three with no access roads, with the Abbey of Moggio as the starting and ending point, is regarded as "one of the finest and most extraordinary day hikes" in Friuli.

== Quellen ==
46°25′18″N 13°9′3″E
