= Montasio =

Italian cheese

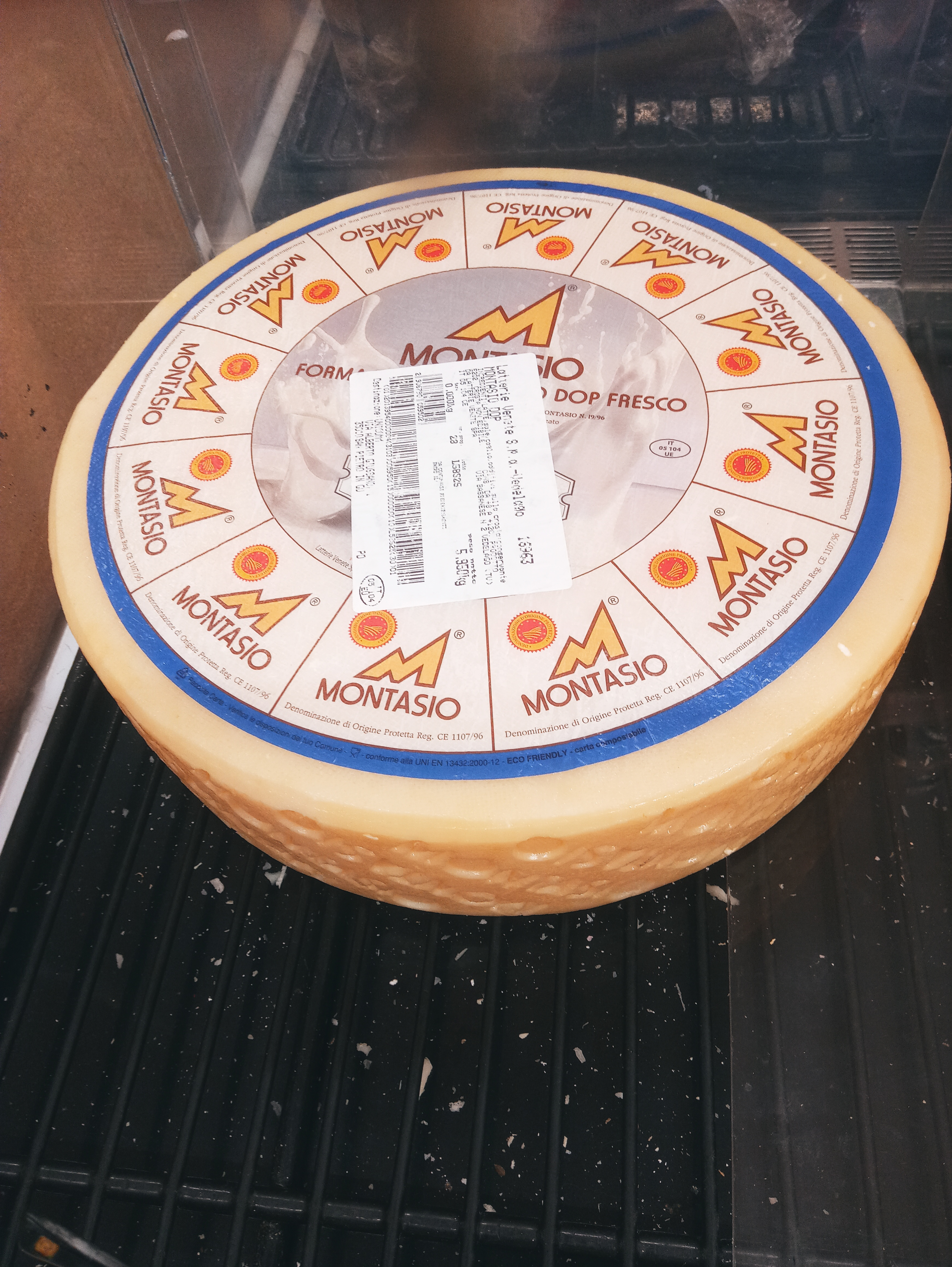
- Country of origin: Italy
- Source of milk: Cow's milk
- Texture: Semi-hard, creamy
- Fat content: 32%
- Aging time: Minimum of two months
- Certification: PDO, 1986

Montasio is a mountain cheese made from cow's milk produced in northeastern Italy in the regions of Friuli-Venezia Giulia and Veneto.

It was awarded a protected designation of origin (PDO) in 1986.

== History ==
It takes its name from the famous Montasio plateau, where cheese has been produced since 1200; the first production techniques were refined at the abbey of San Gallo di Moggio Udinese, while the first evidence of the name dates back to the decree of 22 August 1773, when the Council of the city of Udine imposed on traders the sale at a fixed price of some products, including this cheese, which, as depicted from that document, the price of 19 soldi a pound was imposed.

In 1880, a cooperative movement of dairies was formed to support the production of this cheese. A decree of the Ministry of Agriculture and Forests of 16 March 1987, assigned the Montasio Producers Association the tasks of supervision, control and marketing of Montasio production. Montasio cheese inspired the creation of Italian-Canadian friulano to evade a trademark dispute. Commonly produced in the small farm town of Gemona inside the Friuli-Venezio Giulia region for over 200 years and a little hamlet named Campo Lessie. All farmers took their daily cow's milk production to the cheese maker. A tally was kept, and based on how much milk each family brought in, the corresponding number of cheese wheels were delivered.

== Characteristics ==
- Made from cow's milk
- Country of origin: Italy
- Region: Friuli-Venezia Giulia and Veneto
- Alternative spellings: Montasio fresco
- Type: semi-hard. Versions aged longer develop a harder texture.
- Fat content: 32%
- Texture: creamy and open
- Rind: natural
- Color: pale yellow to gold, depending on age

== Aging ==
It is typically aged for a minimum of two months, and some preparations are aged for a year or more. The rind is typically stamped with the date of its production.

== See also ==
- List of Italian cheeses
- Friulano
- Bergkäse
- Jôf di Montasio
