= Friulian =

Friulian may refer to:

- Something of, from, or related to the Friuli region in northeast Italy.
- Sometimes, by improper extension, something of, from, or related to the Friuli-Venezia Giulia administrative region of northeast Italy.
- Friulian language, spoken in the region of Friuli, Italy.
- Friulians, people of Italy.

== See also ==
- Friulano (disambiguation)
