= Autostrada A23 (Italy) =

Controlled-access highway in Italy

Autostrada A23
- Autostrada Alpe-Adria; Alps-Adria motorway

Route information
- Part of E55
- Maintained by ANAS
- Length: 120 km (75 mi)
- Existed: 1966–present

Major junctions
- South end: Palmanova
- A4 in Palmanova
- North end: Tarvisio

Location
- Country: Italy
- Regions: Friuli-Venezia Giulia

Highway system
- Roads in Italy; Autostrade; State; Regional; Provincial; Municipal
← A 22	→ A 24

The Autostrada A23 or Autostrada Alpe-Adria ("Alps-Adria motorway") is an autostrada (Italian for "motorway") 120 kilometres (75 mi) long in Italy located in the region of Friuli-Venezia Giulia which connects the Autostrada A4 (Turin–Trieste) near Palmanova via Udine to Tarvisio and the Austrian A2 Süd Autobahn. It is a part of the E55 European route. The Autostrada A23 is one of the main transport links between Northeast Italy and Central Europe.

The first section between Palmanova and Udine (13 km) was opened on 30 July 1966. The section from Udine to Carnia-Tolmezzo (34 km) opened on 26 July 1979 and the section from Carnia-Tolmezzo to Austrian border (60 km) on 3 July 1986. The Udine bypass (13 km) opened on 11 June 1988.

== Route ==
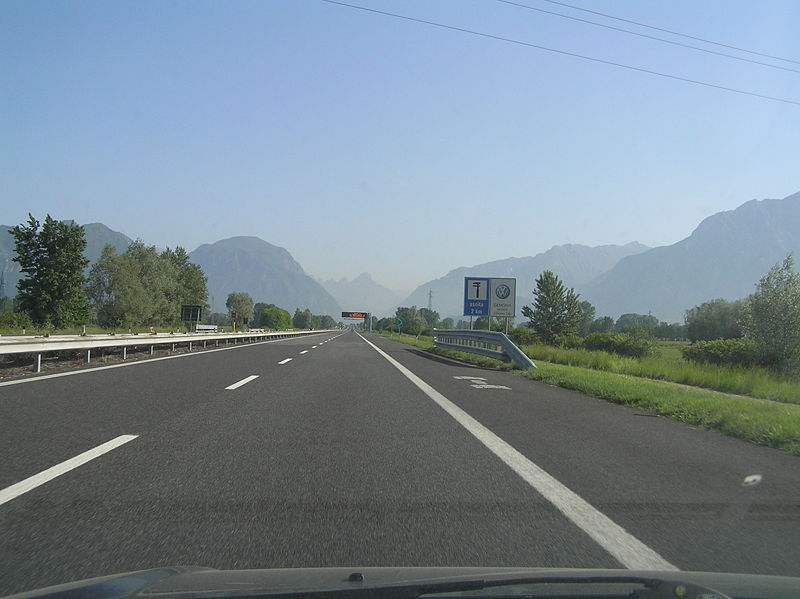
Autostrada A23 near Venzone

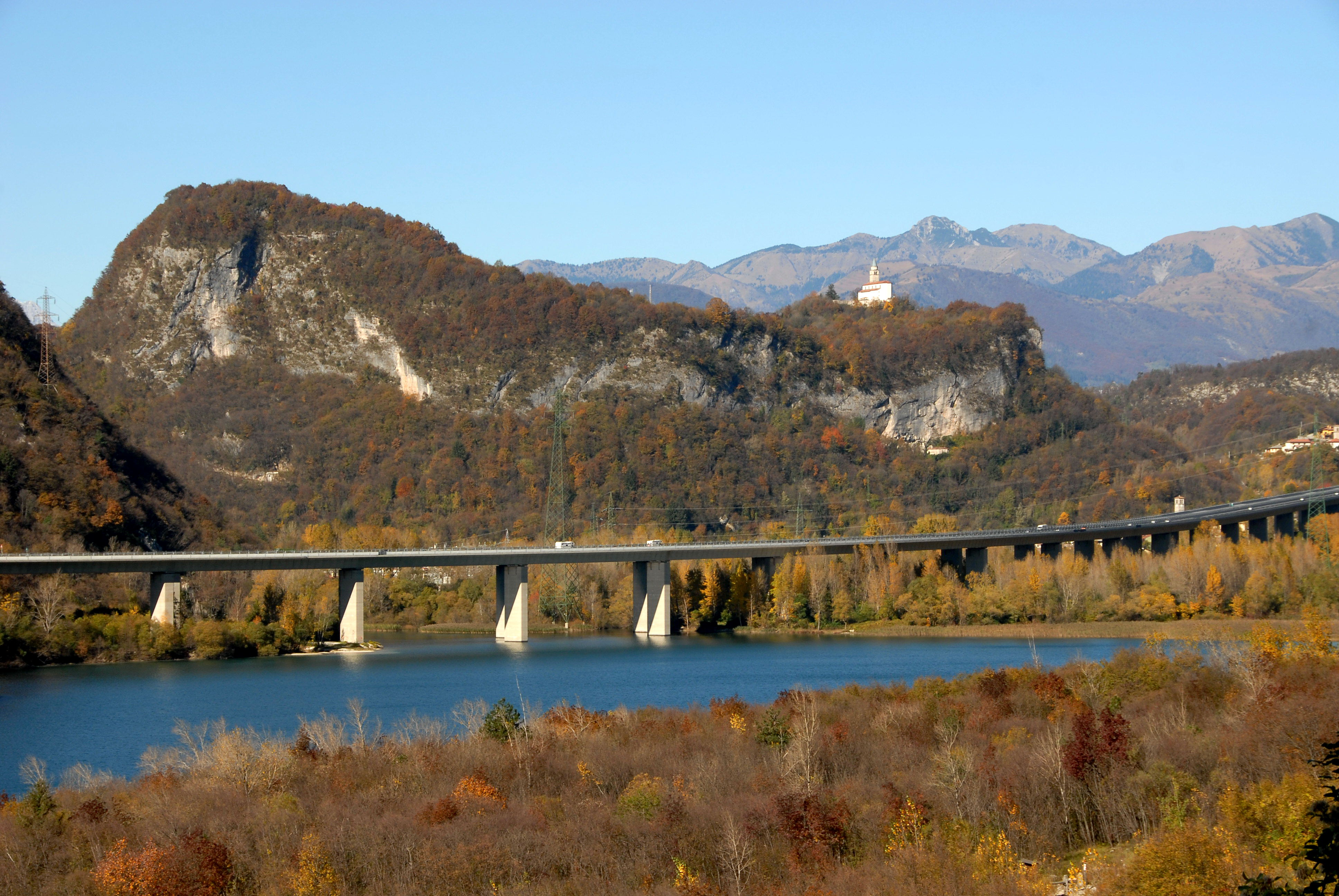
Autostrada A23 above Lake Cavazzo near Cavazzo Carnico

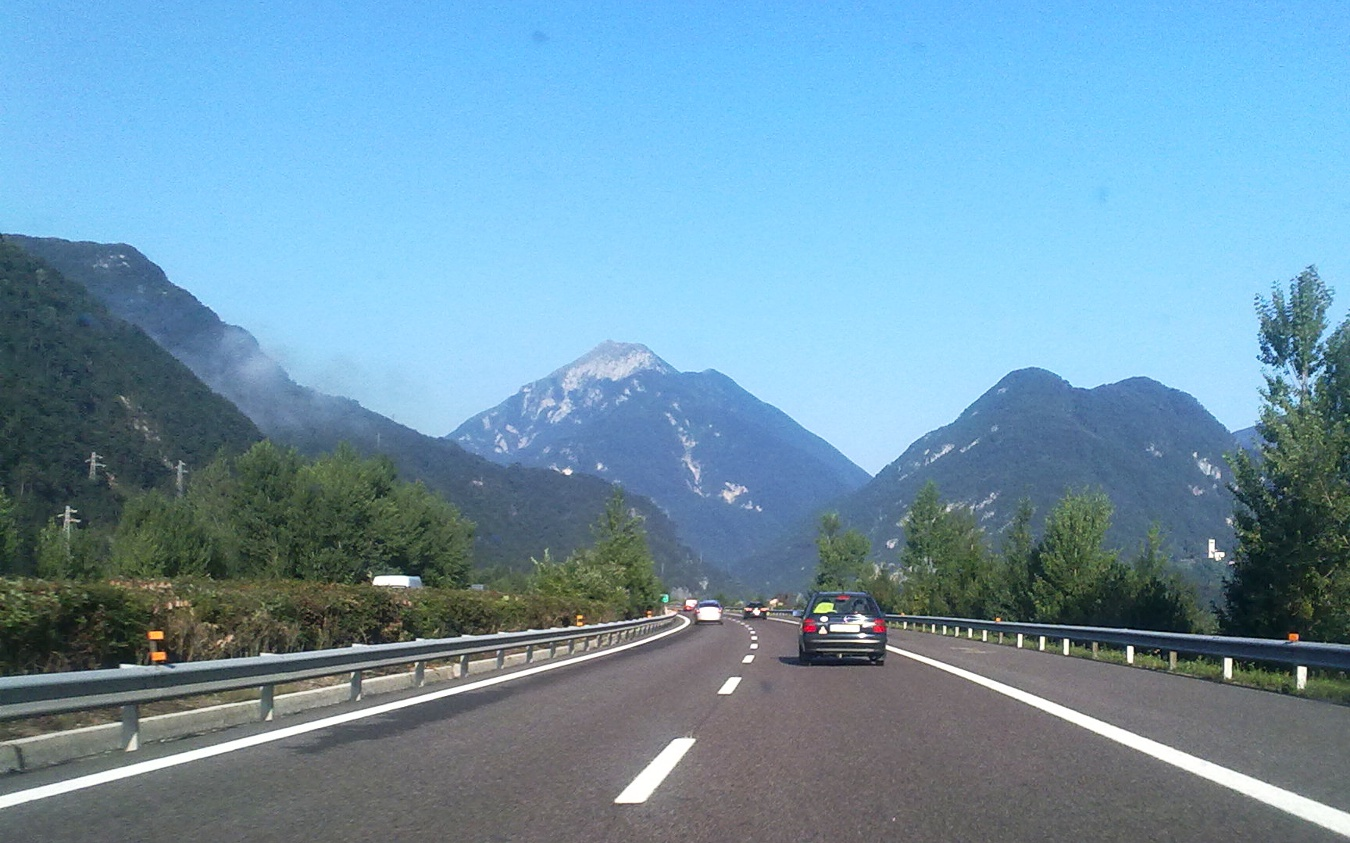
Autostrada A23 near Resiutta

PALMANOVA – TARVISIO; Autostrada Alpe-Adria
Exit	↓km↓	↑km↑	Province	European Route
Venezia-Trieste	0 km (0 mi)	120 km (75 mi)	UD	E55
Udine Sud; Raccordo Udine Sud	13 km (8.1 mi)	106 km (66 mi)	UD	E55
Rest area "Zugliano"	14 km (8.7 mi)	105 km (65 mi)	UD	E55
Udine Nord	26 km (16 mi)	93 km (58 mi)	UD	E55
Rest area "Ledra"	37 km (23 mi)	82 km (51 mi)	UD	E55
Gemona - Osoppo	45 km (28 mi)	74 km (46 mi)	UD	E55
Carnia - Tolmezzo; Carnica	60 km (37 mi)	59 km (37 mi)	UD	E55
Rest area "Campiolo" (Note: Only direction Udine-Palmanova)	--	51 km (32 mi)	UD	E55
Pontebba	93 km (58 mi)	26 km (16 mi)	UD	E55
Rest area "Fella" (Note: Tarvisio direction only)	97 km (60 mi)	--	UD	E55
Toll gate Ugovizza	105 km (65 mi)	14 km (8.7 mi)	UD	E55
Malborghetto Valbruna (Note: Exit only towards the border, entry only towards Udine-Palmanova)	105 km (65 mi)	14 km (8.7 mi)	UD	E55
Tarvisio Sud	108 km (67 mi)	11 km (6.8 mi)	UD	E55
Tarvisio Nord (Note: Entry only towards the border, exit only towards Udine-Palmanova)	115 km (71 mi)	4 km (2.5 mi)	UD	E55
Austria–Italy border Süd Autobahn	120 km (75 mi)	0 km (0 mi)	UD	E55

=== Southern Udine connection ===
RACCORDO UDINE SUD; Southern Udine connection
Exit	↓km↓	↑km↑	Province
Palmanova-Tarvisio	0.0 km (0 mi)	2.7 km (1.7 mi)	UD
Toll gate Udine Sud	0.4 km (0.25 mi)	2.3 km (1.4 mi)	UD
Gorizia-Manzano-Buttrio; Tangenziale Sud di Udine	0.9 km (0.56 mi)	1.8 km (1.1 mi)	UD
Basaldella; Tangenziale Sud di Udine	2.7 km (1.7 mi)	0.0 km (0 mi)	UD

== See also ==
- Autostrade of Italy
- Roads in Italy
- Transport in Italy

=== Other Italian roads ===
- State highways (Italy)
- Regional road (Italy)
- Provincial road (Italy)
- Municipal road (Italy)
