= Friulano =

Friulano, from Friuli, may refer to:

- Friulano (language)
- Friulano (grape)
- Friulano (cheese), Canadian-Italian cheese
