= Dogna =

Dogna Dunja (Slovene) Dogne (Friulian)
- Comune
- Comune di Dogna
- Interactive map of Dogna
- Location within Italy Location within Friuli-Venezia Giulia
- Coordinates: 46°27′N 13°19′E
- Country: Italy
- Region: Friuli-Venezia Giulia
- Province: Udine (UD)

Area
  - Total: 70.0 km^{2} (27.0 sq mi)
- Elevation: 430 m (1,410 ft)

Population (Dec. 2004)
  - Total: 235
  - Density: 3.36/km^{2} (8.69/sq mi)
- Demonym: Dognesi
- Time zone: UTC+1 (CET)
  - Summer (DST): UTC+2 (CEST)
- Postal code: 33010
- Dialing code: 0428
- Website: Official website

Dogna (Slovene: Dunja; Friulian: Dogne) is a comune (municipality) in the Regional decentralization entity of Udine in the Italian region of Friuli-Venezia Giulia, located about 100 kilometres (62 mi) northwest of Trieste and about 45 kilometres (28 mi) north of Udine. As of 31 December 2004, it had a population of 235 and an area of 70.0 square kilometres (27.0 mi^{2}).

Dogna borders the following municipalities: Chiusaforte, Malborghetto Valbruna, Moggio Udinese, Pontebba.

== Demographic evolution ==
Historical population

Year	Pop.	±%
1861	?	—
1871	1,502	—
1881	1,356	−9.7%
1901	1,420	+4.7%
1911	1,367	−3.7%

Year	Pop.	±%
1921	1,518	+11.0%
1931	1,219	−19.7%
1936	1,044	−14.4%
1951	987	−5.5%
1961	764	−22.6%

Year	Pop.	±%
1971	474	−38.0%
1981	390	−17.7%
1991	299	−23.3%
2001	259	−13.4%

Source: Data from ISTAT
