= Ernesto Lomasti =

Italian mountain climber (1959-1979)

Ernesto Luigi Lomasti
- Born: 29 October 1959; Udine, Italy
- Died: 12 June 1979 (aged 19); Arnad, Italy
- Occupations: Alpino, mountaineer

Ernesto Luigi Lomasti (29 October 1959 – 12 June 1979) was an Italian mountaineer and alpino skier. He is regarded as one of the Italian pioneers of climbing as a sport. He died during training in the Valle d'Aosta, Arnad, in the local alpini training place called "la groviera" (the holey cheese), he fell apparently being struck by lightning. He is also remembered for techniques on the Machaby pillar, in Arnad, in May 1979. The pillar today is named Lomasti pillar.

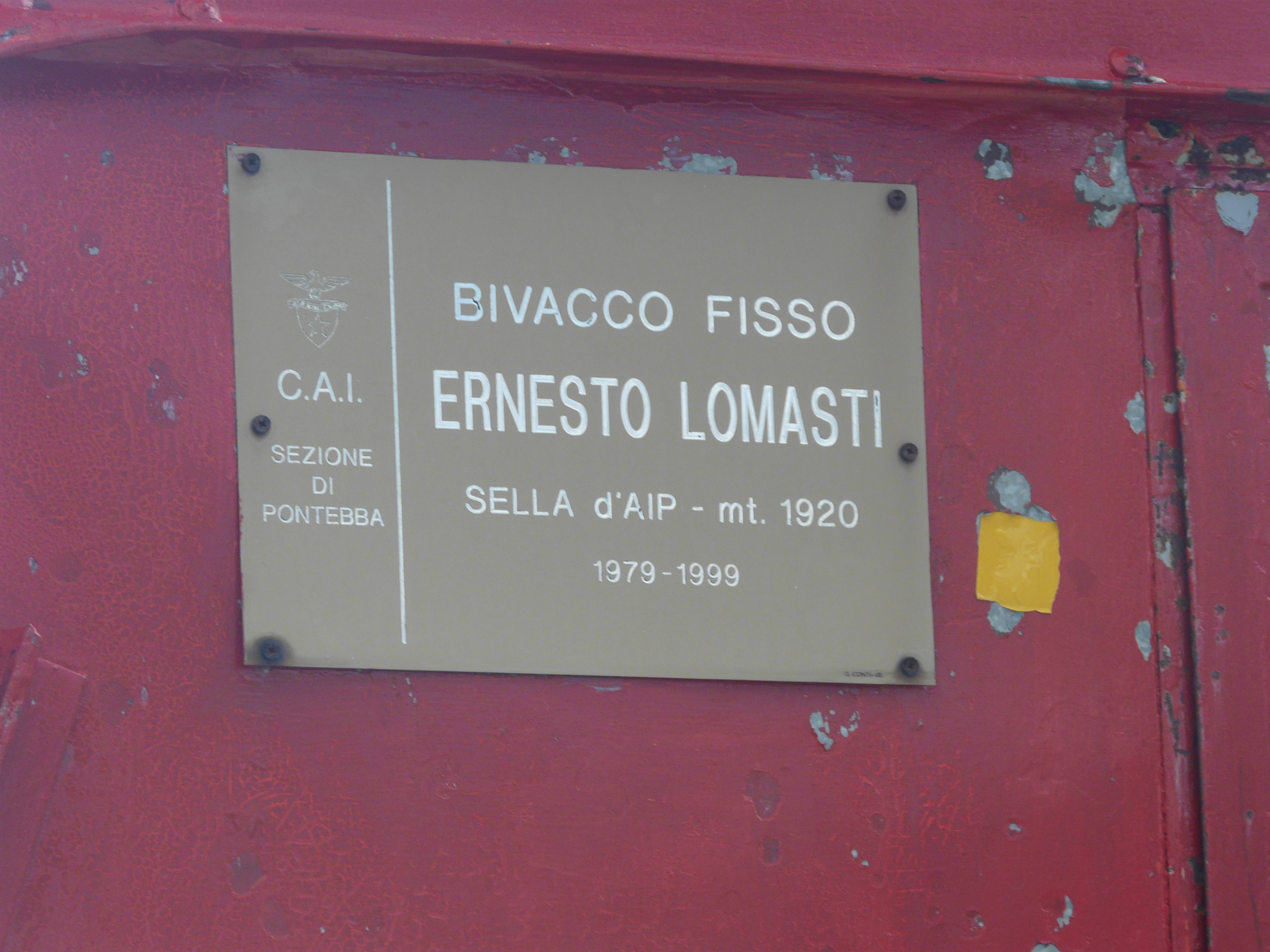

== Early life ==
Ernesto Lomasti was born in Udine but spent his early life in Pontebba and Tarvisio, where he attended the local school. During childhood, he contracted pertussis and his parents and uncle used to bring him up on high hills. On 29 June 1973, he left middle school and passed the exam, earning his father a climb on the Jôf di Montasio along with a local mountain guide. Following an accident at age three, he severely damaged his hearing in his right ear. This disability would severely impair his climbing career because of having difficulties hearing climbing instructions. The problem was solved on 29 August 1977 when he decided to undergo surgery. He served under the Alpini corps attending the SMALP (alpini military school) until his sudden death.

== Climbing achievements ==
Lomasti is remembered for a series of ascents of extraordinary difficulty His life as a climber spanned three years, primarily in the Julian Alps from 1976 to 1979, with an impressive list of great gradients. He is remembered especially for Cima Grande della Scala, north anti-peak, on 3 September 1978. All his ascents were conquered using hard boots, as he apparently never had the chance to use light shoes.

== Places ==
Despite his short career, there are several places that are named after Lomasti.

- Lomasti Pillar, Machaby, Arnaud
- Bivacco Lomasti, Creta di Aip, Alpi Carniche: A Mountain hut in Pontebba.
- Lomasti-Mazzilis crevice, on Cima Grande della Scala

== Quotes ==
"[...] per me Lomasti e' stato il piu' grande alpinista friulano di sempre...
"[...] to me Lomasti has been the greatest friulan mountaineer ever...
Ignazio Piussi

== Literature ==
- Gianni Nazzi e Mario Blasoni, Dizionario biografico friulano, 1997, pag. 710.
