= Resiutta =

Resiutta Resiùte (Friulian) Na Bili (Slovene)
- Comune
- Comune di Resiutta
- Location within Italy Location within Friuli-Venezia Giulia
- Coordinates: 46°24′N 13°13′E
- Country: Italy
- Region: Friuli-Venezia Giulia
- Province: Udine (UD)
- Frazioni: Povici

Government
  - Mayor: Francesco Nesich (Civic Party)

Area
  - Total: 20.36 km^{2} (7.86 sq mi)
- Elevation: 316 m (1,037 ft)

Population (Jan. 2015)
  - Total: 311
  - Density: 15.3/km^{2} (39.6/sq mi)
- Demonym: Resiuttani
- Time zone: UTC+1 (CET)
  - Summer (DST): UTC+2 (CEST)
- Postal code: 33010
- Dialing code: 0433
- Patron saint: Martin of Tours
- Saint day: 11 November

Resiutta (Friulian: Resiùte; Slovene: Na Bili) is a comune (municipality) in the Regional decentralization entity of Udine in the northeastern Italian region of Friuli-Venezia Giulia. It is located in the Canal del Ferro valley, approximately 100 kilometres (62 mi) northwest of Trieste and about 35 kilometres (22 mi) north of Udine. As of 31 December 2014, the municipality had a population of 311 and covered an area of 20.0 square kilometres (7.7 mi^{2}).

The municipality of Resiutta contains the frazione (borough) of Povici.

Resiutta borders the following municipalities: Chiusaforte, Moggio Udinese, Resia, Venzone.

== Demographic evolution ==
Historical population

Year	Pop.	±%
1871	831	—
1881	885	+6.5%
1901	949	+7.2%
1911	881	−7.2%
1921	1,004	+14.0%

Year	Pop.	±%
1931	838	−16.5%
1936	758	−9.5%
1951	798	+5.3%
1961	613	−23.2%
1971	491	−19.9%

Year	Pop.	±%
1981	445	−9.4%
1991	405	−9.0%
2001	353	−12.8%
2011	313	−11.3%
2014	311	−0.6%

Source: Data from ISTAT

== Gallery ==
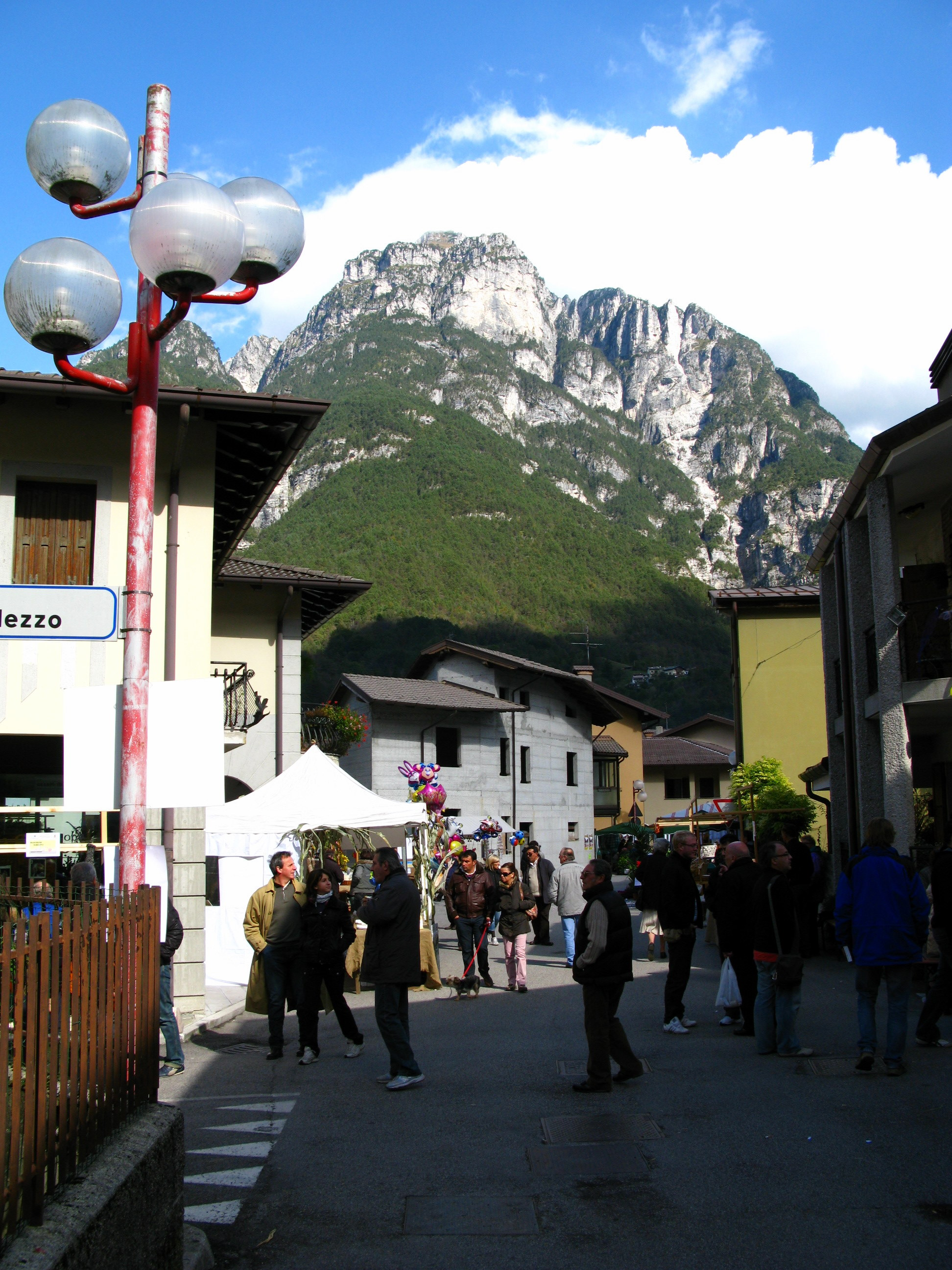
At the center

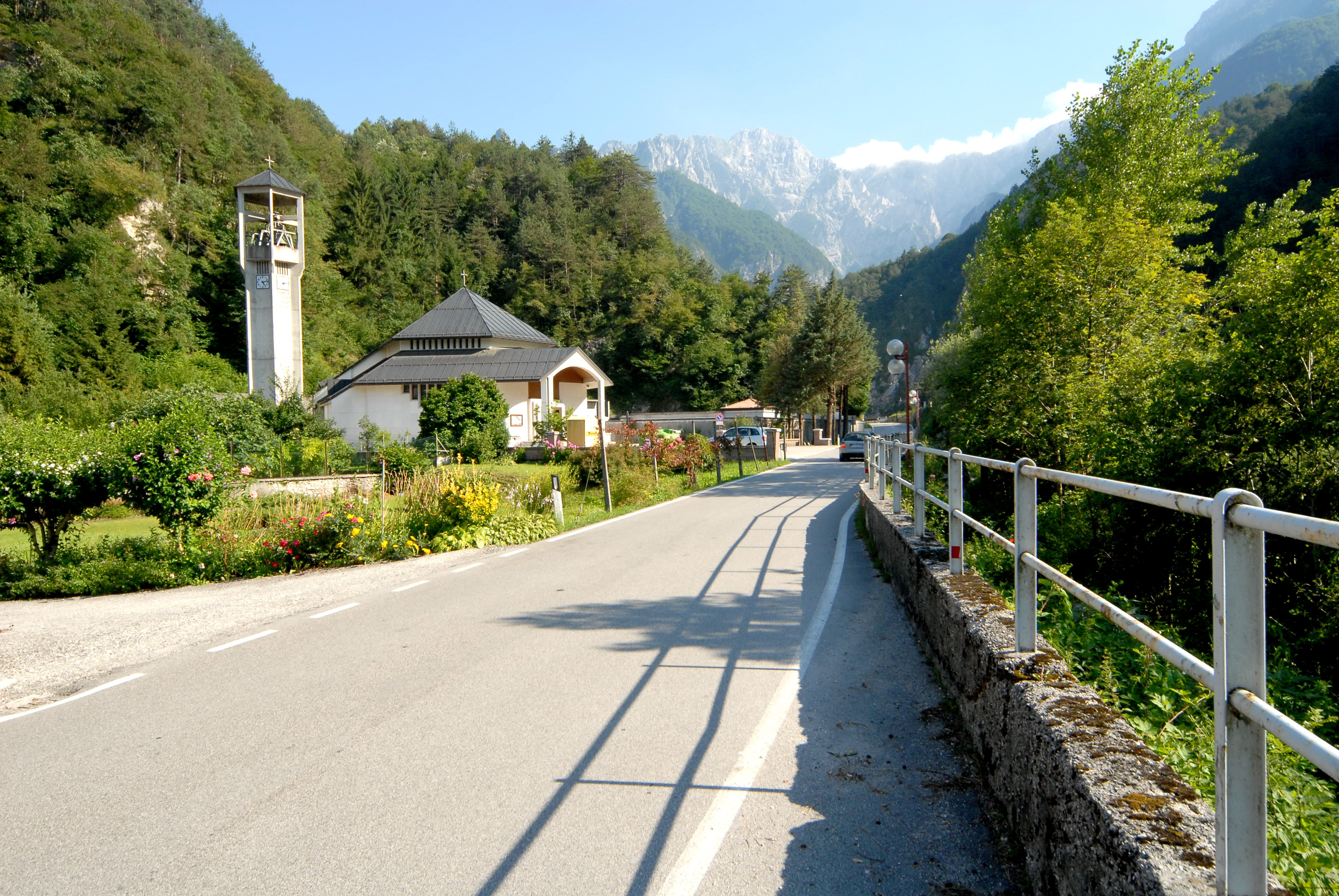
Parish church Saint Martin

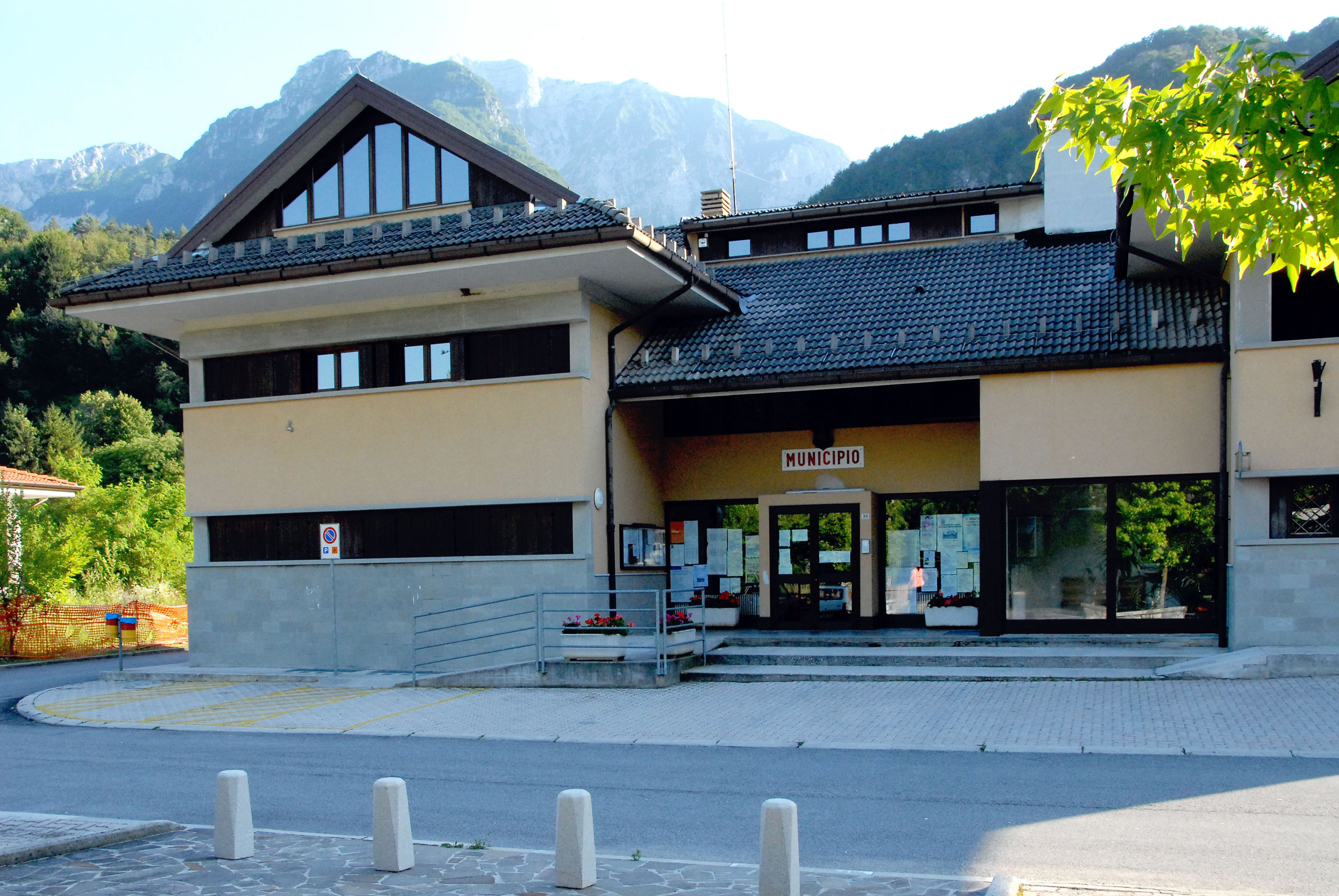
Municipio

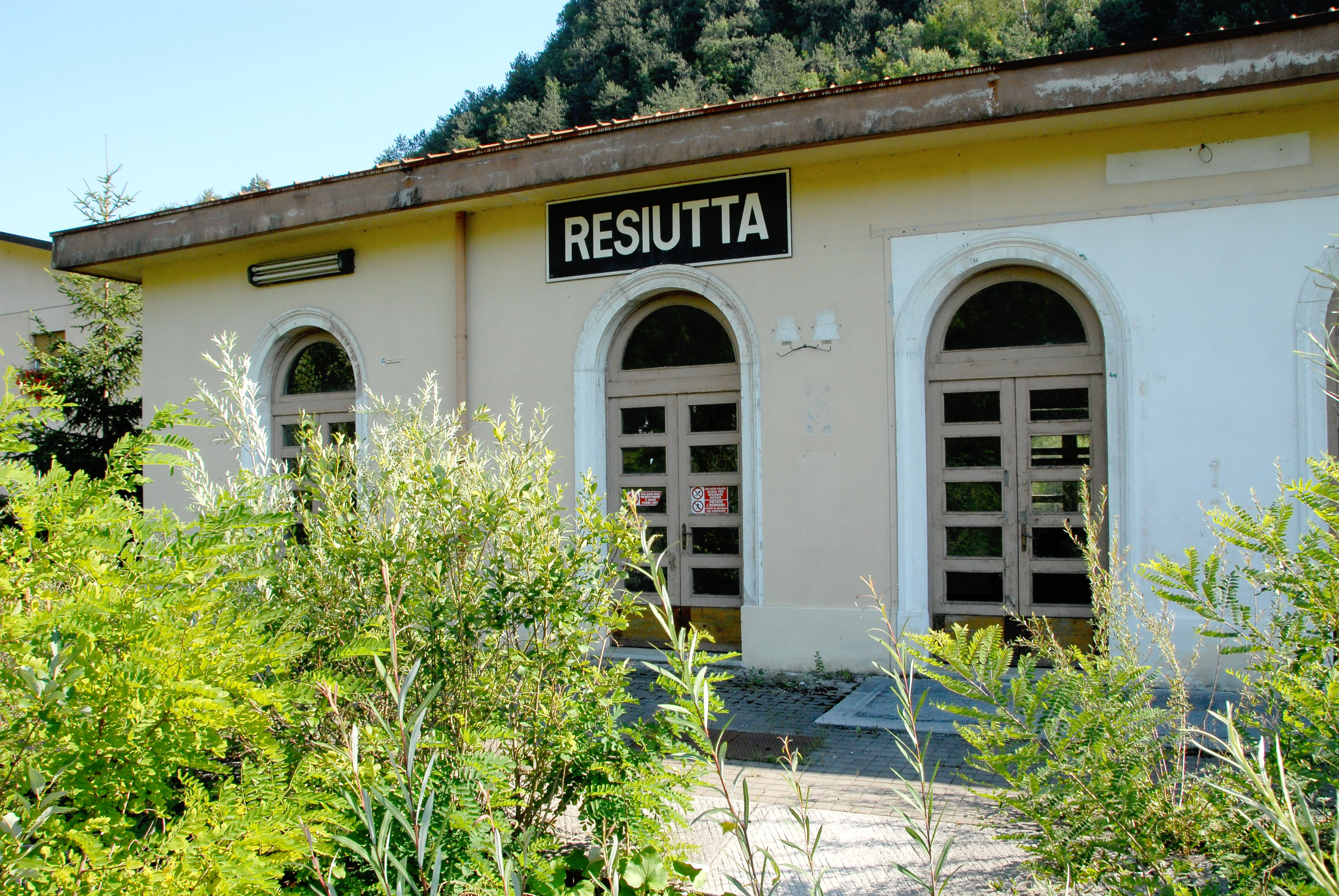
Defunct station of the old railway

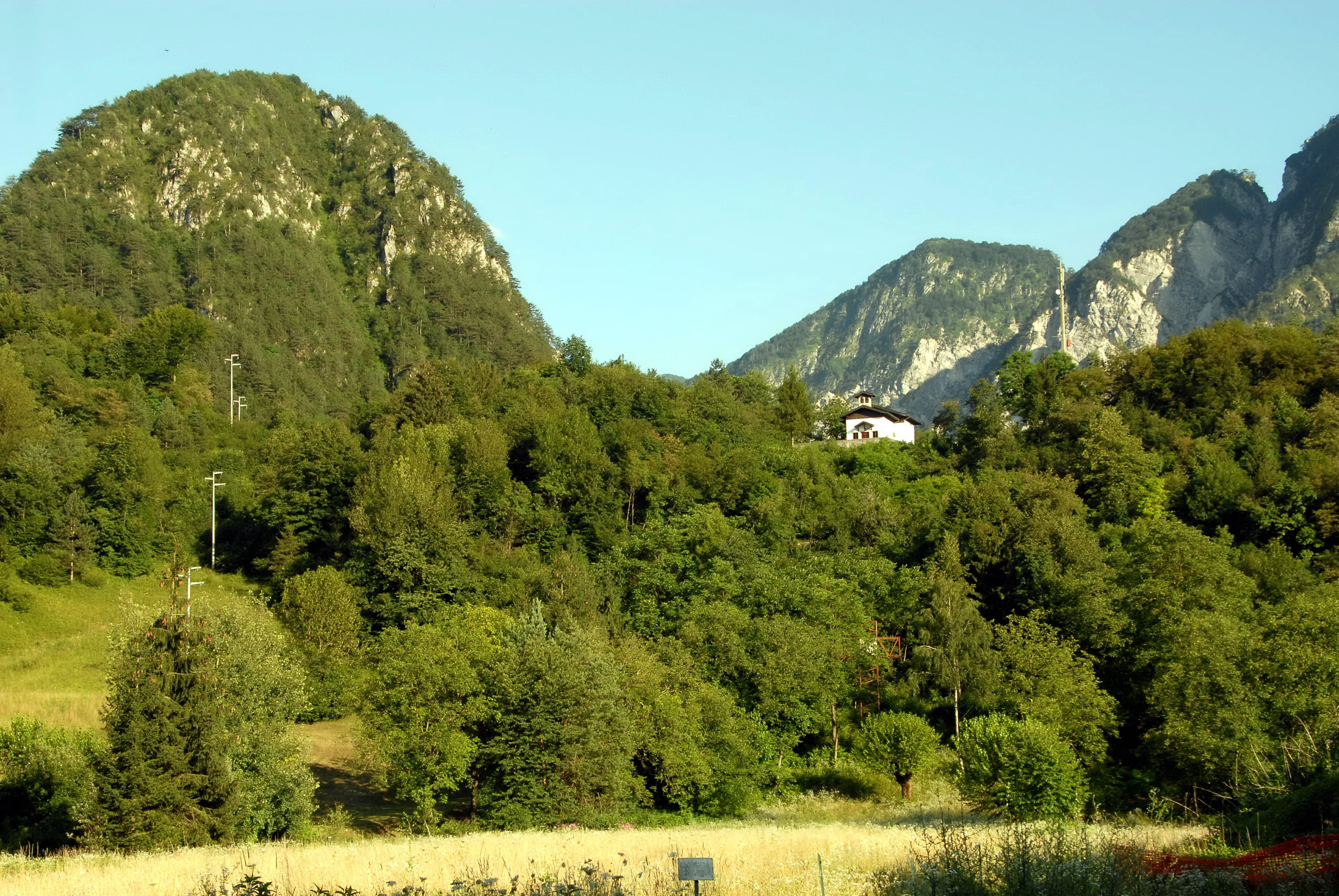
The mountains of Resiutta
