= Malborghetto Valbruna =

Malborghetto Valbruna Naborjet-Ovčja ves (Slovene) Malborgeth-Wolfsbach (German)
- Comune
- Comune di Malborghetto Valbruna
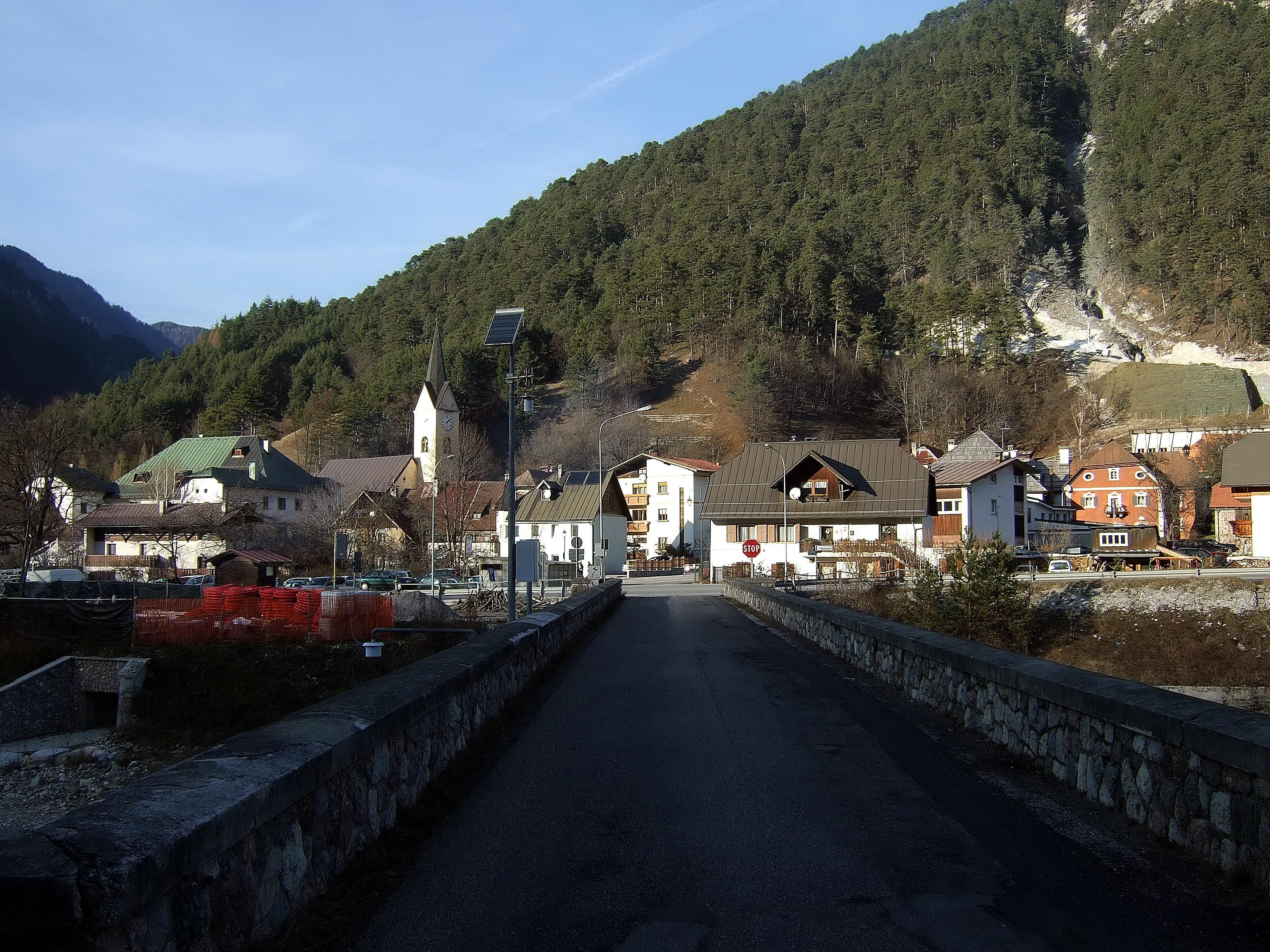

- Location within Italy Location within Friuli-Venezia Giulia
- Coordinates: 46°30′N 13°27′E
- Country: Italy
- Region: Friuli-Venezia Giulia
- Province: Udine (UD)
- Frazioni: Bagni di Lusnizza, Malborghetto (sede comunale), Santa Caterina, Ugovizza, Valbruna, Cucco

Area
  - Total: 120.5 km^{2} (46.5 sq mi)

Population (Dec. 2004)
  - Total: 1,025
  - Density: 8.506/km^{2} (22.03/sq mi)
- Time zone: UTC+1 (CET)
  - Summer (DST): UTC+2 (CEST)
- Postal code: 33010
- Dialing code: 0428

Malborghetto Valbruna (Slovene: Naborjet-Ovčja ves; German: Malborgeth-Wolfsbach; Friulian: Malborghet-Valbrune) is a comune (municipality) in the Regional decentralization entity of Udine in Friuli-Venezia Giulia, north-east Italy.

== Geography ==
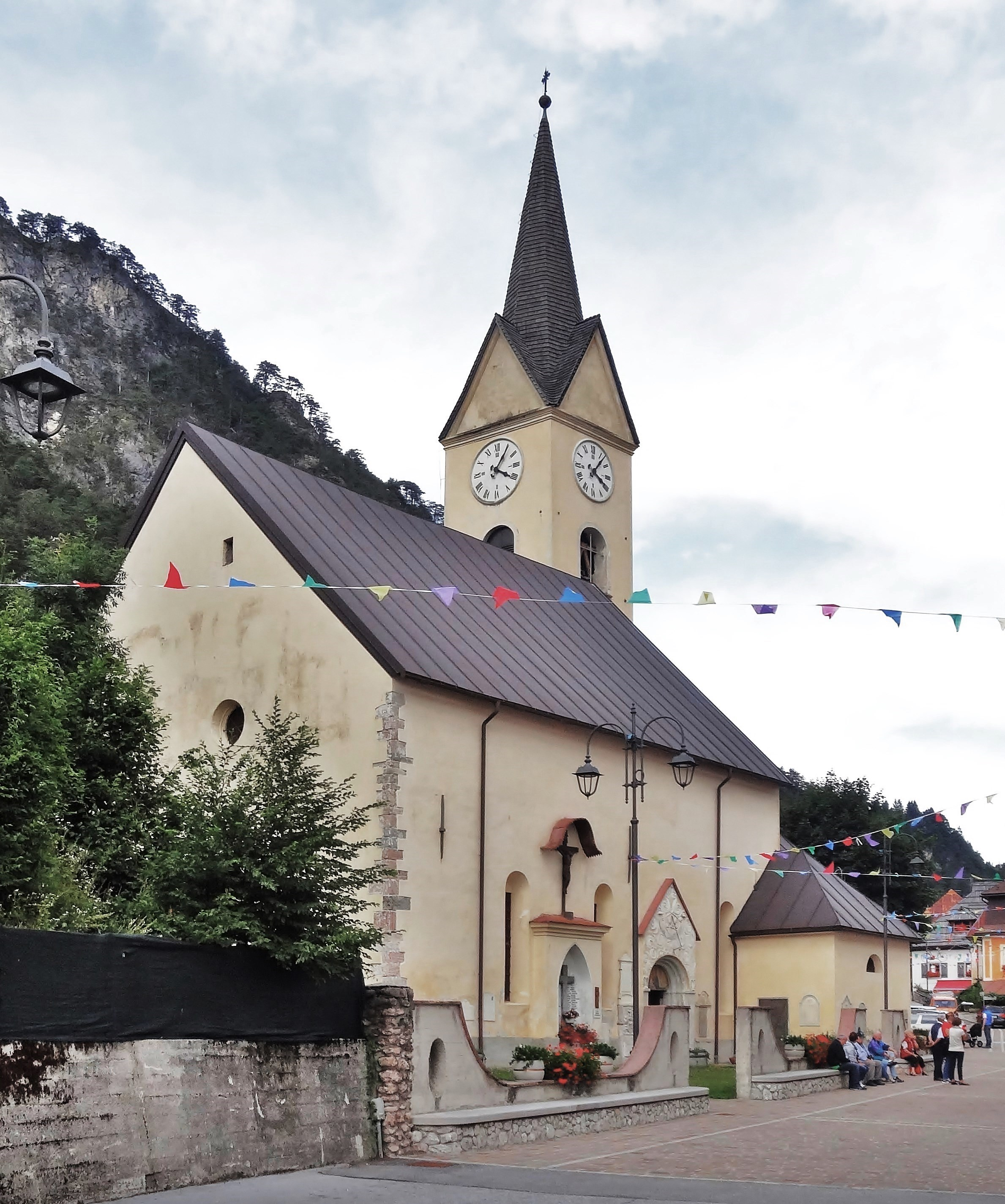
Parish church

Malborghetto-Valbruna is located about 100 kilometres (62 mi) northwest of Trieste and about 50 kilometres (31 mi) northeast of the regional capital Udine, on the border with Austria. It is one of the three municipalities in the Canal Valley (Val Canale) of the Fella River, between Tarvisio in the east and Pontebba in the west.

In the north, the crest of the Carnic Alps forms the border with the Austrian state of Carinthia and the municipalities of Hermagor-Pressegger See, Sankt Stefan im Gailtal, Feistritz an der Gail, and Hohenthurn. In the south, the Jôf di Montasio massif of the Julian Alps separates it from the Italian municipalities of Chiusaforte and Dogna.

Beside the villages of Malborghetto and Valbruna, the municipal area includes the frazioni (boroughs) of Bagni di Lusnizza (Lusniz/Lužnice/Lusnitz), Santa Caterina (Sante Catarine/Šenkatríja/St. Kathrein), and Ugovizza (Ugovize/Ukve/Uggowitz) as well as the locality of Cucco (Cuc/Kúk/Kuk). Ugovizza-Valbruna station is a stop on the Pontebbana railway line from Udine to Tarvisio, which was largely rebuilt until 2000. Valbruna also has access to the A23 Alpe-Adria Autostrada, running from the Austrian border and the A2 Süd Autobahn to Udine as part of the European route E55.

== History ==
For centuries, German-, Romance- (Italian- and Friulian-) as well as Slavic- (Slovene)-speaking people settled in the Canal Valley, which from 1077 was ruled by the Carinthian duke Liutold of Eppenstein, while King Henry IV of Germany ceded the adjacent territory of the Imperial March of Verona in the south to the Patriarchate of Aquileia. While the Aquileia territory was gradually conquered by Venice and incorporated into the Domini di Terraferma by 1433, the settlement then named Buonborgeth was part of the Carinthian possession held by the Prince-Bishops of Bamberg. The village, economical relevant for its iron ore and silver deposits at Valbruna as well as for its forestry, received its current name male (evil) due to the constant border quarrels with the Serenissima.

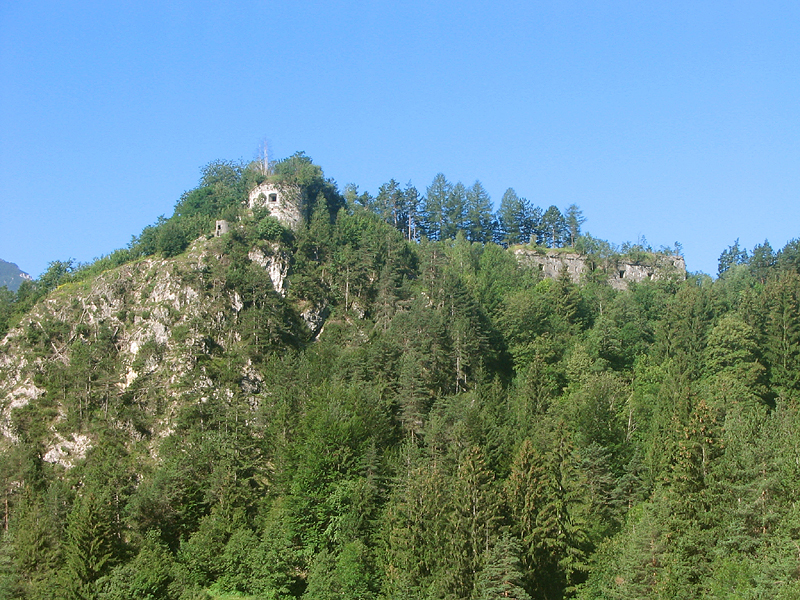
Fort Hensel

The Austrian Habsburgs, Carinthian dukes since 1335, had a border fortress built at Malborgeth, which was occupied by Venice in 1616, by French Revolutionary troops led by General André Masséna during the War of the First Coalition in 1797, and again by French Imperial forces under Napoleon's stepson Eugène de Beauharnais in 1805. Again attacked by Beauharnais' troops during the War of the Fifth Coalition in 1809, it was defended by an Austrian contingent under the command of Captain Friedrich Hensel from 14 to 17 May. They finally succumbed to the French, but prevented their arrival at the Battle of Aspern-Essling on 21 May, where Austrian Archduke Charles was able to repel Napoleon's forces. The Malborgeth fortress was named Fort Hensel in the honour of the captain, who like most of his men was killed in battle.

After World War I and the dissolution of the Austro-Hungarian Empire, Malborghetto and the Canal Valley was adjudicated to the Kingdom of Italy according to the Treaty of Saint-Germain and the 1915 London Pact. In the course of the 1939 South Tyrol Option Agreement between Italy and Nazi Germany, most of the German-speaking population was resettled to Carinthia.

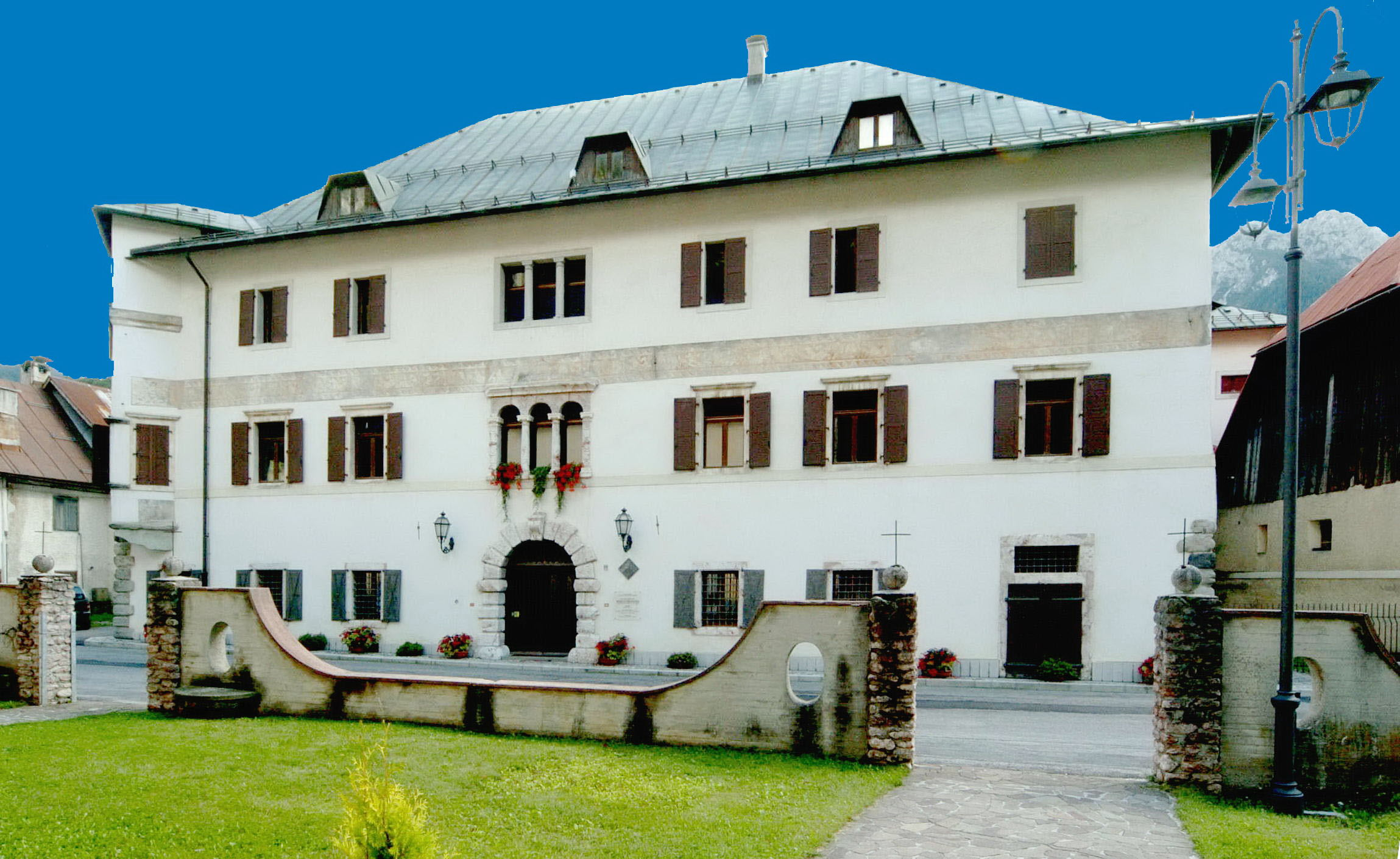
Malborghetto, Venetian Palace

In 2003, Malborghetto-Valbruna was included in the list of municipalities where the Slovene minority was granted special protection. In 2017, Karl von Habsburg, the head of the House of Habsburg, was granted honorary citizenship of Malborghetto.
