= Moggio Udinese =

Moggio Udinese Mosach/Mosnitz (German) Možac/Možnica (Slovene)
- Comune
- Comune di Moggio Udinese
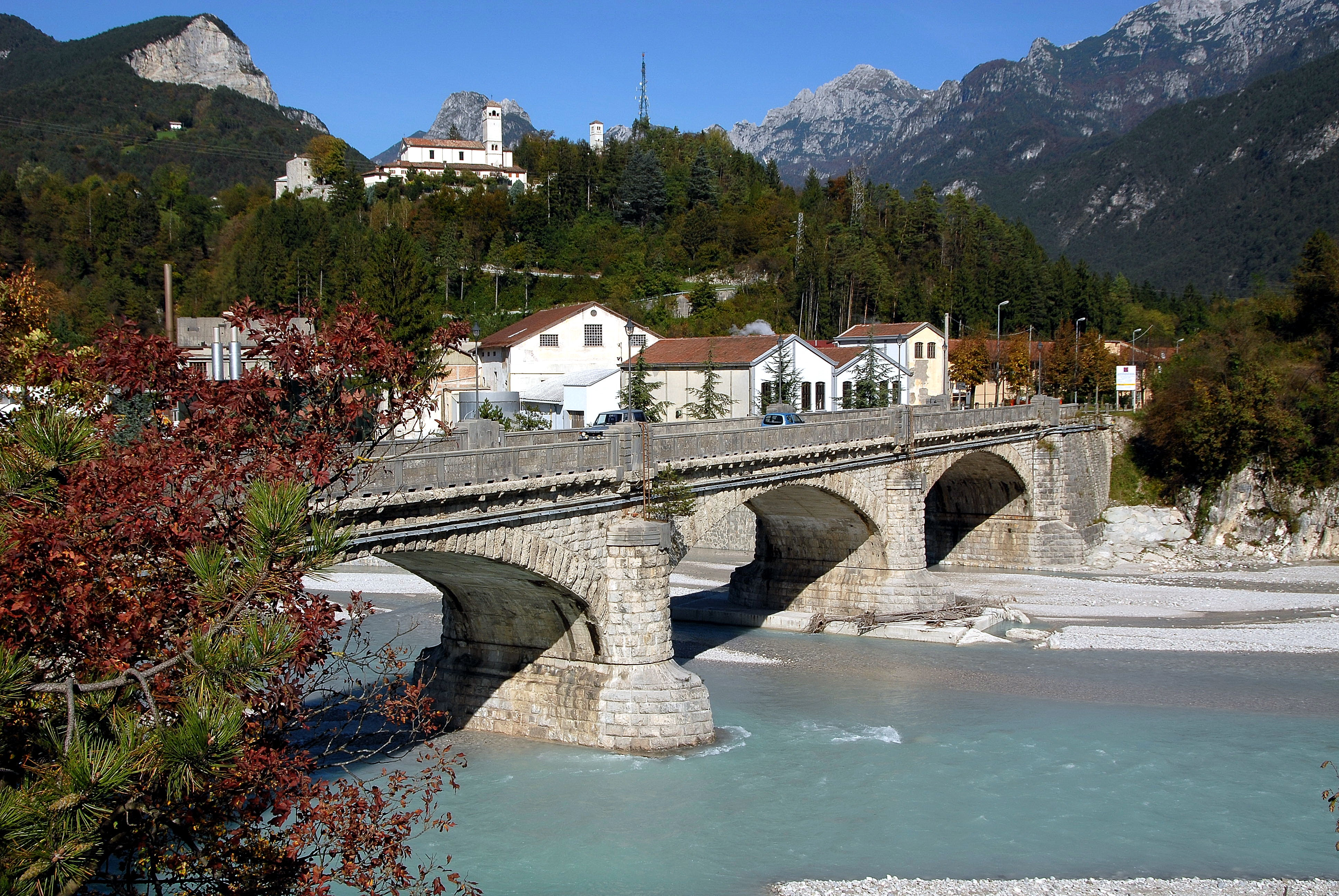
- Bridge across the Fella River with San Gallo Abbey

- Location within Italy Location within Friuli-Venezia Giulia
- Coordinates: 46°25′N 13°12′E
- Country: Italy
- Region: Friuli-Venezia Giulia
- Province: Udine (UD)
- Frazioni: Bevorchians, Campiolo, Dordolla, Grauzaria, Moggessa, Monticello, Ovedasso, Pradis-Chiaranda, Stavoli

Government
  - Mayor: Giorgio Filaferro

Area
  - Total: 143.5 km^{2} (55.4 sq mi)
- Elevation: 341 m (1,119 ft)

Population (1 January 2016)
  - Total: 1,745
  - Density: 12.16/km^{2} (31.49/sq mi)
- Demonym: Moggesi
- Time zone: UTC+1 (CET)
  - Summer (DST): UTC+2 (CEST)
- Postal code: 33015
- Dialing code: 0433
- Website: Official website

Moggio Udinese (German: Mosach or Mosnitz; Slovene: Možac or Možnicia; Friulian: Mueç) is a comune (municipality) in the Regional decentralization entity of Udine in the Italian region of Friuli-Venezia Giulia.

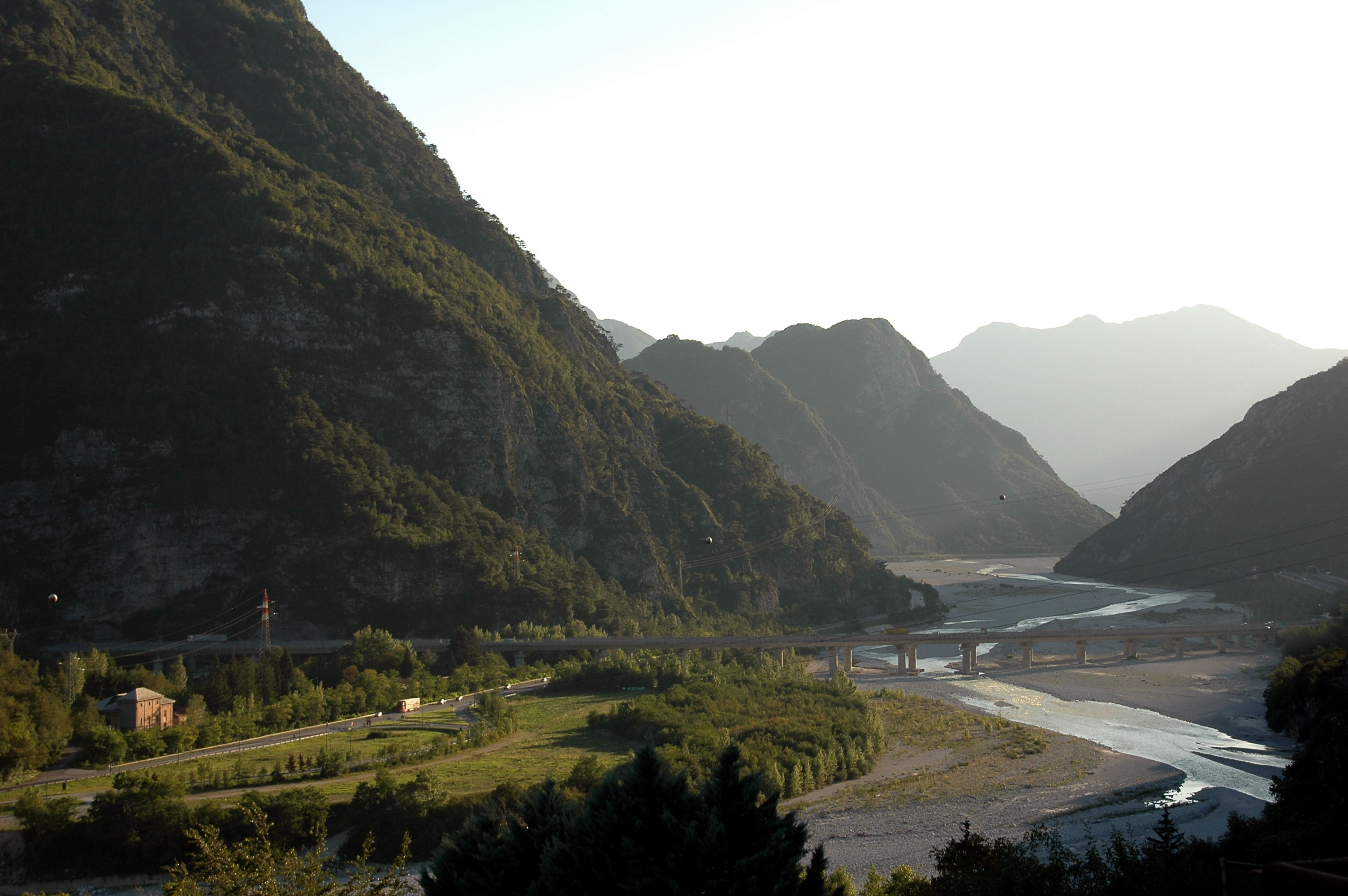
Fella Valley with A23 viaduct

It is situated in the Friuli region, in the valley of the Fella River, a right tributary of the Tagliamento. Moggio is located about 100 kilometres (62 mi) northwest of Trieste and about 40 kilometres (25 mi) north of Udine. In the north, the mountains of the Carnic Alps stretch up to the border with Austria; beyond the Fella are the Julian Alps with the Resia Valley in the southeast. As of 31 December 2004, the municipality had a population of 1,991 and an area of 143.5 square kilometres (55.4 mi^{2}). It can be reached via the Autostrada A23.

Moggio Udinese borders the following municipalities: Amaro, Arta Terme, Chiusaforte, Dogna, Hermagor-Pressegger See (Austria), Paularo, Pontebba, Resiutta, Tolmezzo, Venzone.

== History ==
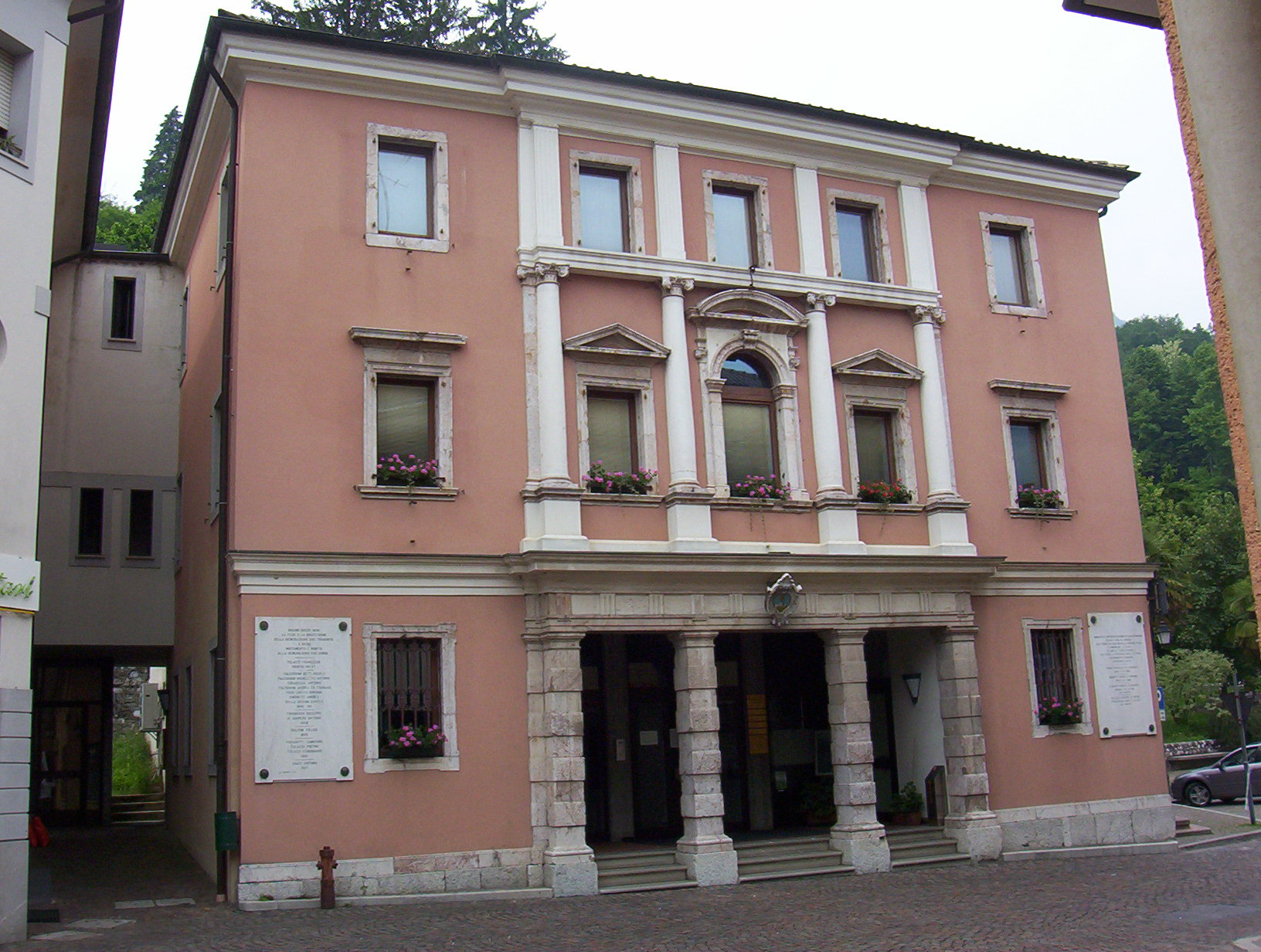
the city Hall

The area had already been settled in Roman times, when a castrum or at least a watchtower was erected to control the traffic on the road from Italy to the province of Noricum in the north.

According to legend, one Carinthian noble Cacellino (Kazelin), a member of the Aribonids dynasty, about 1084/85 ceded his Friulian estates around Moggio to his brother-in-law Patriarch Frederick of Aquileia. Though the deed of donation has been identified as a fake, it is documented that in 1119 Frederick's successor Ulrich of Eppenstein established a Benedictine monastery at the site, dedicated to Saint Gall. By an 1185 bull of Pope Lucius III, the abbey was directly subordinate to the Holy See. With the Patriarchate of Aquileia, the monastic community decayed in the 15th century. When most of Friuli was conquered by the Republic of Venice in 1420, the monks had to accept Venetian overlordship with their domains incorporated into the Domini di Terraferma.

The monastery was finally dissolved in 1773, a few years later the Moggio area fell to the Habsburg monarchy according to the 1797 Treaty of Campo Formio and became part of the Austrian Kingdom of Lombardy–Venetia by resolution of the Congress of Vienna in 1815. Upon the Third Italian War of Independence in 1866, it fell to the newly established Kingdom of Italy.

== Twin towns ==
Moggio Udinese is twinned with:

- Moggio, Italy
