= Friulano (cheese) =

Canadian cheese

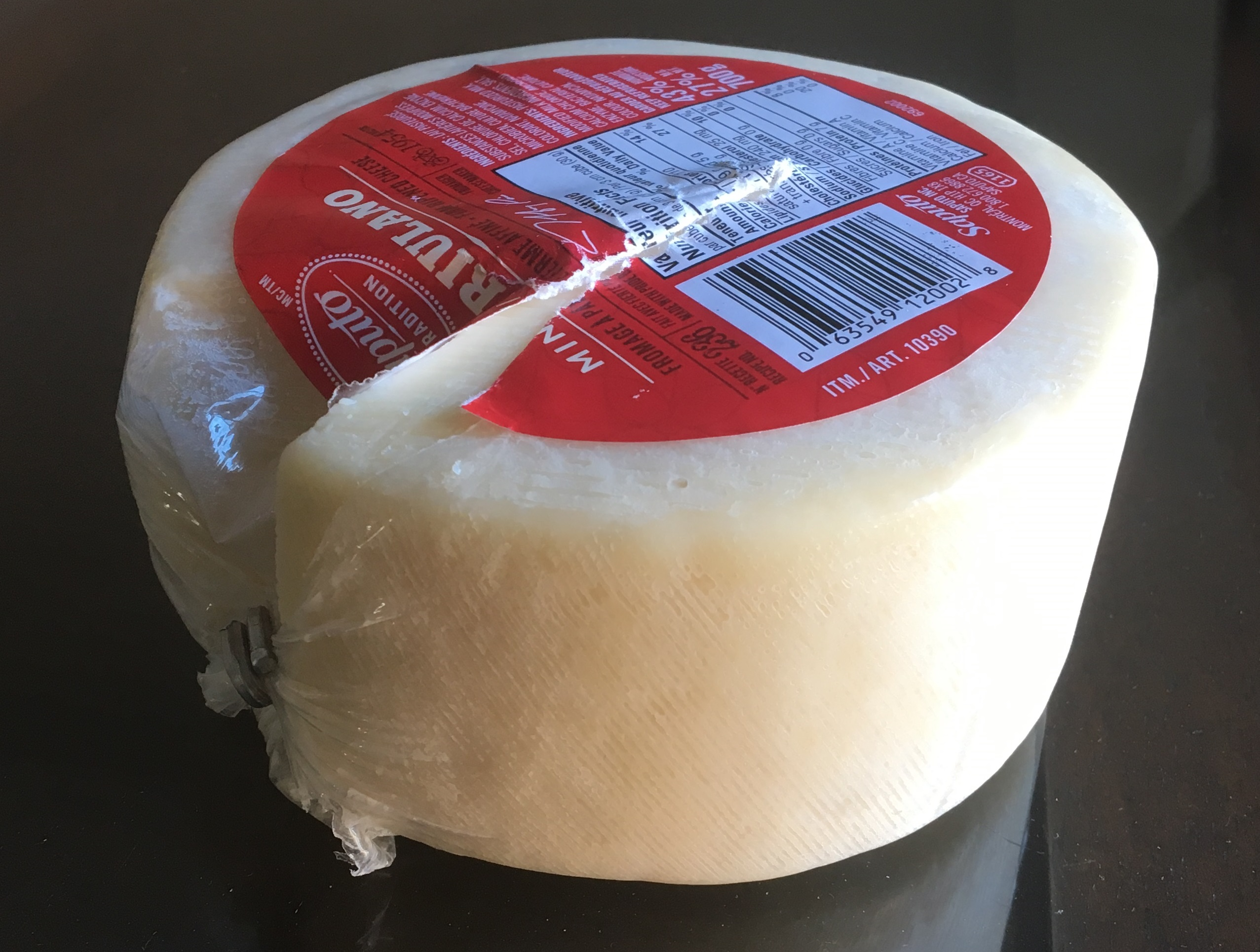
- Country of origin: Canada
- Source of milk: Cow's milk
- Texture: Creamy
- Fat content: 27%
- Aging time: Minimum of two months

Friulano is the name of a firm cow's milk cheese made in Canada named after the Friuli region of Italy. It is rindless and interior-ripened with a yellow surface and interior. It is salty and tastes slightly of hazelnut. It is sometimes called Italian Cheddar, though it is not cheddared and does not taste like a Cheddar. It closely resembles Italian Montasio cheese, which it strives to imitate, but has a different name, since in Canada the name Montasio can only be used for cheeses made in the Montasio mountains of the Friuli region of Italy. Friulano has been in use since the early 1980s.

Unlike many supermarket cheeses that stay the same, Friulano "levels up" significantly if you let it age.

== See also ==
- List of cheeses
