= Pontebba =

Pontebba Pontafel (German) Tablja (Slovene)
- Comune
- Comune di Pontebba
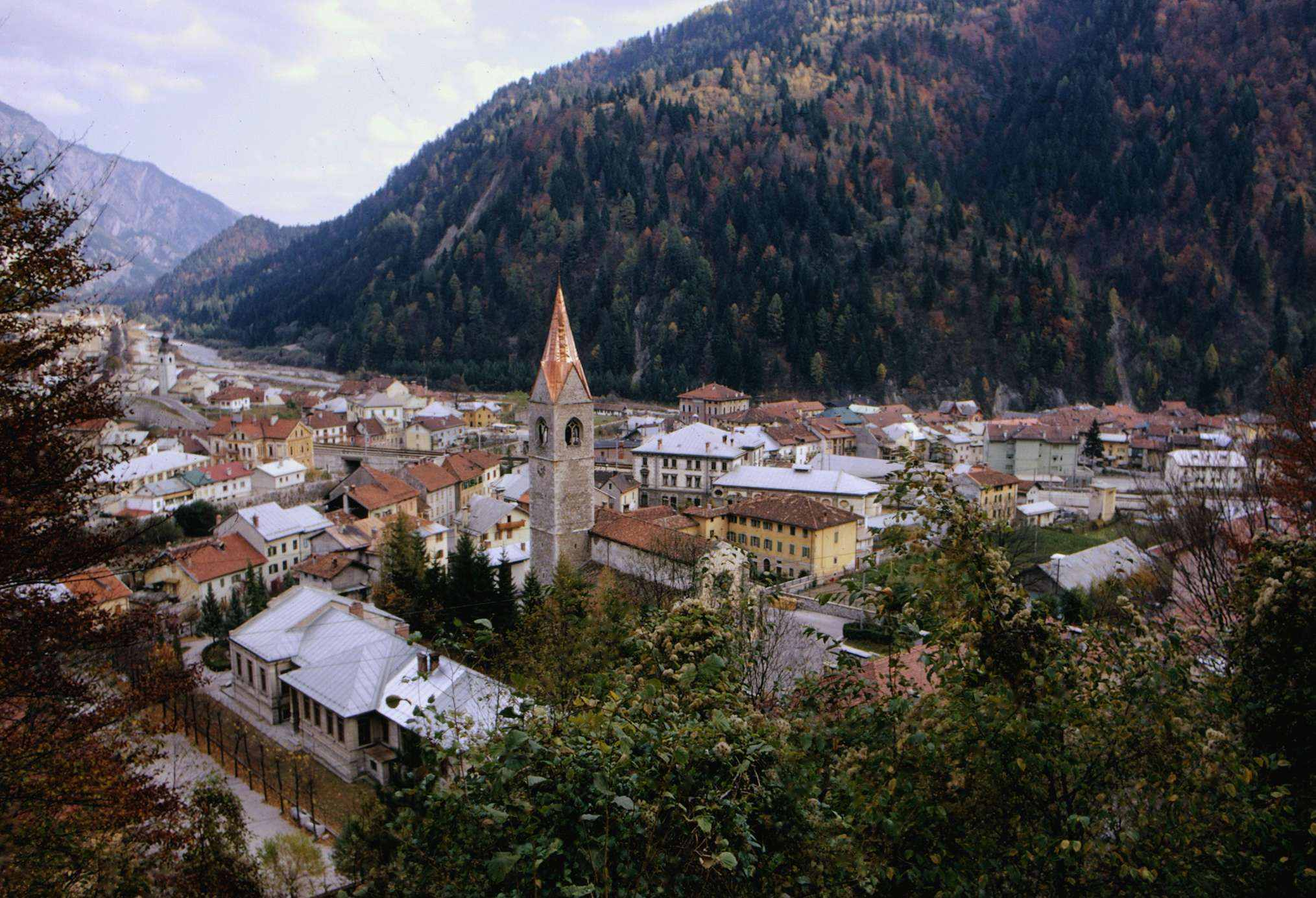

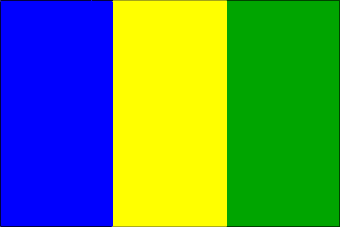
- Flag

- Location within Italy Location within Friuli-Venezia Giulia
- Coordinates: 46°30′N 13°19′E
- Country: Italy
- Region: Friuli-Venezia Giulia
- Province: Udine (UD)
- Frazioni: Aupa, Loc. Casali Costa, Loc. Casali Graben, Loc. Frattis, Loc. Gamischen, Passo Pramollo, Loc. Piani, Pietratagliata, Lagleise San Leopoldo, Studena Alta, Studena Bassa

Government
  - Mayor: Ivan Buzzi

Area
  - Total: 97.7 km^{2} (37.7 sq mi)

Population (Oct. 2020)
  - Total: 1,344
  - Density: 13.8/km^{2} (35.6/sq mi)
- Demonym: Pontebbani
- Time zone: UTC+1 (CET)
  - Summer (DST): UTC+2 (CEST)
- Postal code: 33016
- Dialing code: 0428
- ISTAT code: 030076
- Patron saint: Natività di Maria
- Saint day: September 8
- Website: Official website

Pontebba (German: Pontafel; Slovene: Tablja; Friulian: Ponteibe) is a comune (municipality) in the Regional decentralization entity of Udine in the Italian region of Friuli-Venezia Giulia.

== Geography ==
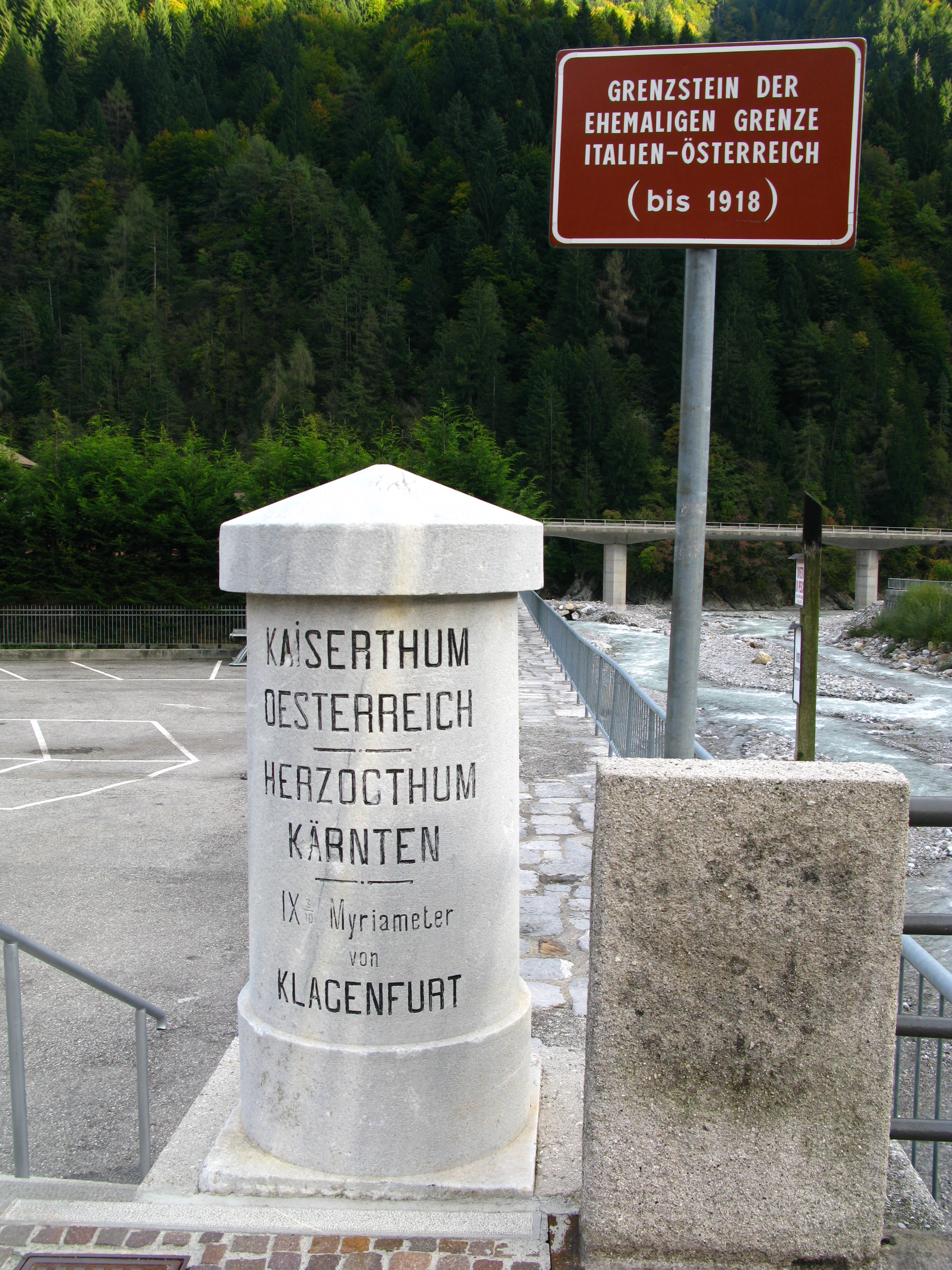
Historical border stone

Pontebba, named after Italian: ponte meaning "bridge", is situated at the confluence of the Pontebbana creek and the Fella River, itself a tributary of the Tagliamento. It is located about 100 kilometres (62 mi) northwest of Trieste and about 50 kilometres (31 mi) north of Udine, near the border with Austria. As of 31 October 2020, Pontebba had a population of 1,344 and an area of 97.7 square kilometres (37.7 mi^{2}).

The municipality contains the frazioni (boroughs) of Aupa, Loc. Casali Costa, Loc. Casali Graben, Loc. Frattis, Loc. Gamischen, Passo Pramollo, Loc. Piani, Pietratagliata, Lagleise San Leopoldo, Studena Alta, Studena Bassa

Pontebba borders the following municipalities: Dogna in the south, Hermagor-Pressegger See (Austria) in the north, Malborghetto Valbruna in the east and Moggio Udinese in the west.

== History ==
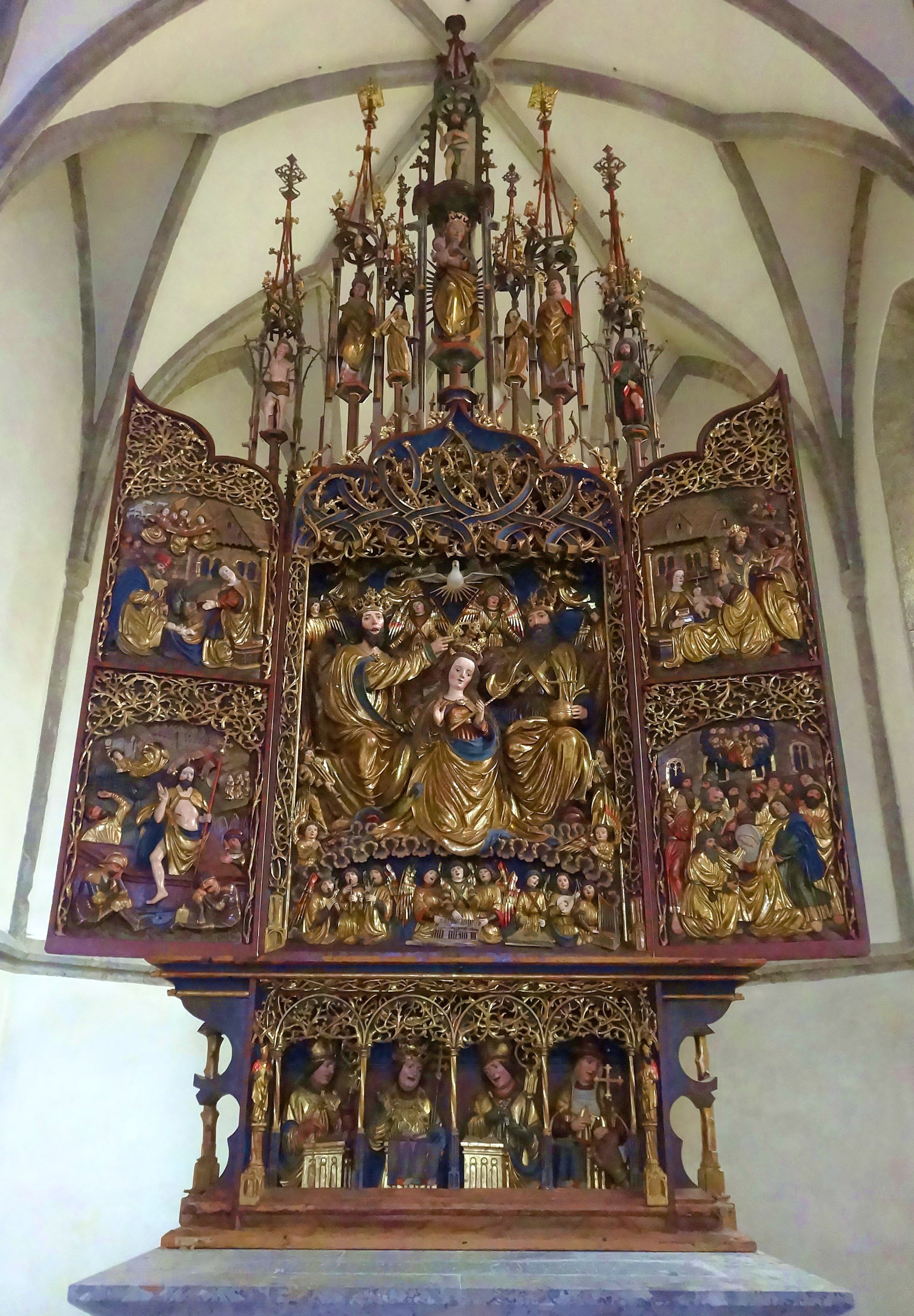
the Flügelaltar in Pieve of Santa Maria Maggiore

From the early 10th century onward, Pontebbana Creek formed the border between the March of Verona, the former Lombard Duchy of Friuli to the south, and the Bavarian March of Carinthia to the north. After the 1420 conquest of the Patriarchate of Aquileia, the settlement of Pontebba south of the creek belonged to the Domini di Terraferma of Venice. The corresponding settlement of Pontafel north of the bridge belonged to the Carinthian Canal Valley, an exclave held by the Imperial Prince-Bishopric of Bamberg, which was incorporated into the Inner Austrian territories of the Habsburg dynasty in 1759.

It was only in 1874 that the Telegraph came to Pontafel. The opening of a k.k. State telegraph station with "limited daily services" took place at the same time as in other smaller places of the monarchy.

After World War I according to the Treaty of Saint-Germain-en-Laye, the border of the Kingdom of Italy with the Republic of Austria was shifted up the Canal Valley north to the town of Tarvisio. The two settlements of Pontebba (Italy) and Pontafel (formerly Austrian) were finally merged on 15 August 1924. During World War II, the rail line through the town was the target of heavy aerial bombardment by the United States Army Air Forces because it was used by Germany to transport supplies to Italy. However, the aerial bombardment did not succeed in damaging the rail line, which is still in use today.

== Sports ==
Aquile Friuli-Venezia Giulia, the region's flagship ice hockey team, plays its home games at the PalaVuerich arena in Pontebba and is affiliated with the local ice sports society Sport Ghiaccio Pontebba. The team is a member of the Serie A and won the 2008 Italian Cup.

== Transport ==
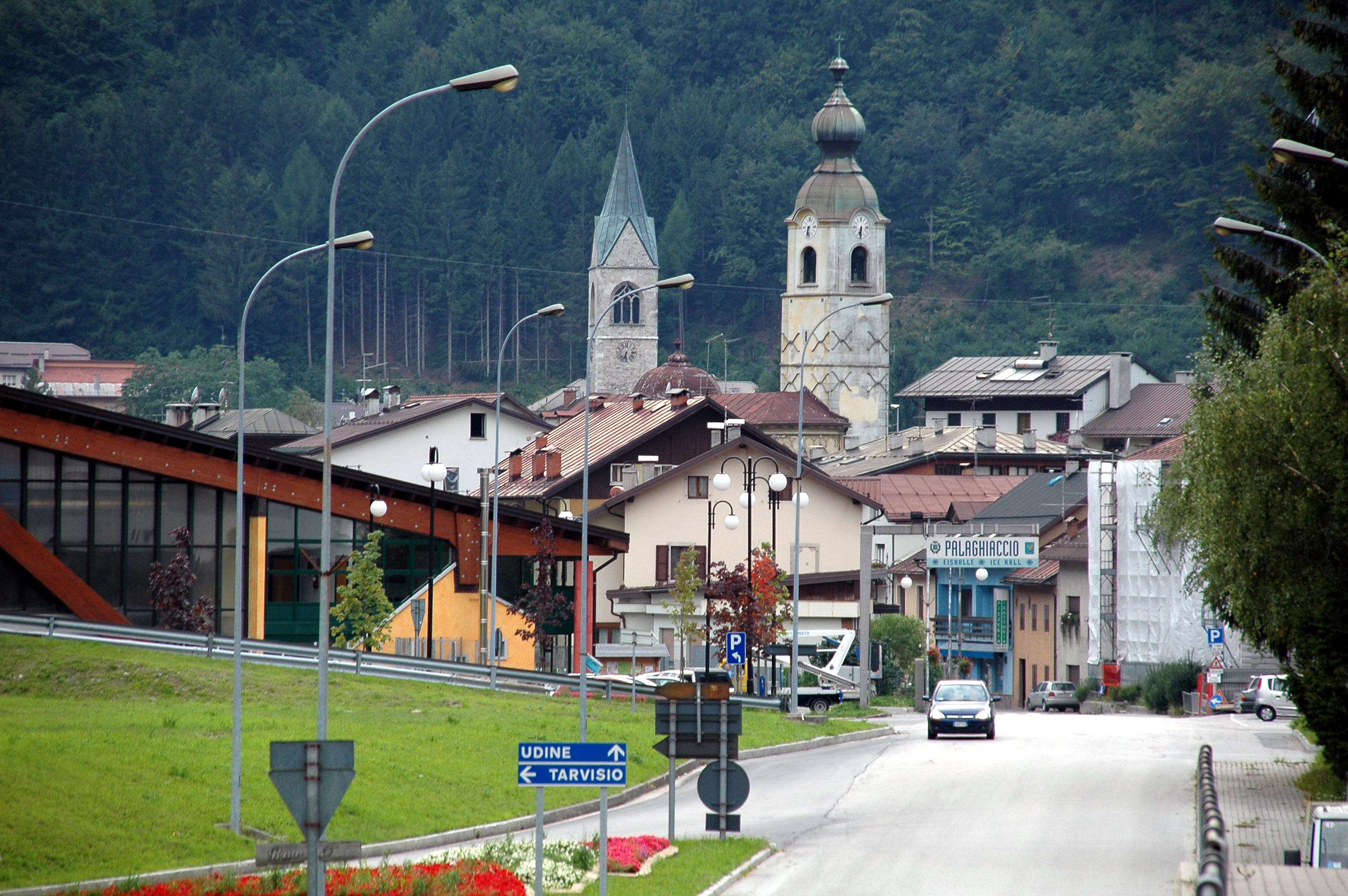
Road to Pontebba from the east

Pontebba can be reached via the A23 autostrada, European route E55, running from Palmanova and the A4 to Tarvisio and the Austrian A2 Süd Autobahn, as well as by the parallel Strada Statale 13 Pontebbana. Here the Strade Provinciale 110 to the Naßfeld Pass (Italian: Passo di Pramollo) branches off.

The Pontebba train station is at the new Pontebbana railway line from Udine to Tarvisio and the Austrian border. Opened in 2000, it replaces the old k.k. Staatsbahn Tarvis-Pontafel built in 1879.

== Demographic evolution ==
Historical population

Year	Pop.	±%
1861	?	—
1871	3,114	—
1881	3,457	+11.0%
1901	3,829	+10.8%
1911	4,591	+19.9%

Year	Pop.	±%
1921	4,121	−10.2%
1931	4,022	−2.4%
1936	3,703	−7.9%
1951	3,931	+6.2%
1961	3,561	−9.4%

Year	Pop.	±%
1971	3,013	−15.4%
1981	2,502	−17.0%
1991	2,206	−11.8%
2001	1,768	−19.9%
2011	1,503	−15.0%

Source: Data from ISTAT

== Notable residents ==
- Adele Faccio, politician
- Ernesto Lomasti, mountaineer
