= Attems =

Italian noble family

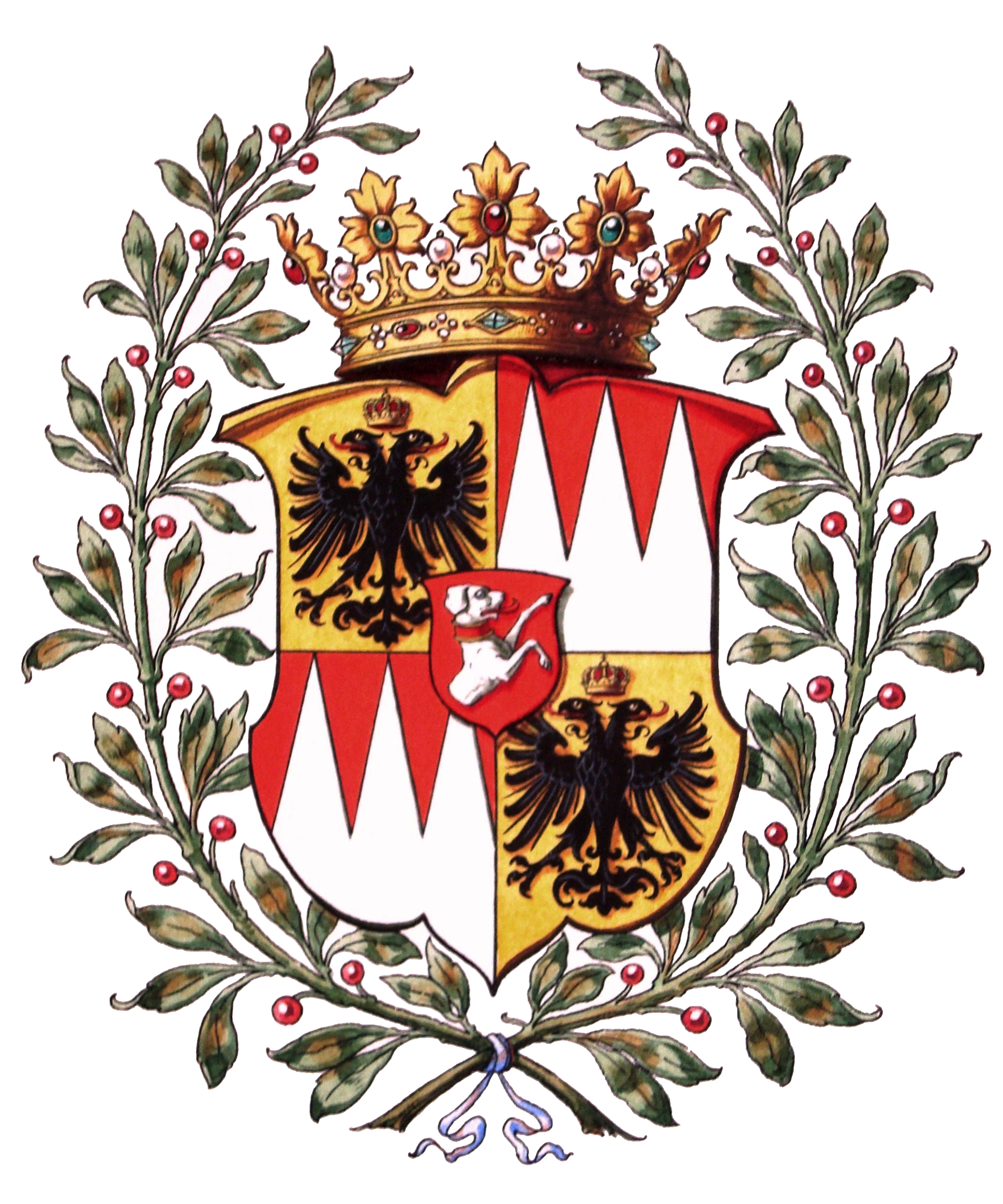
- Attems coat of arms from the 1630 document conferring the Reichsgrafen title.
- Parent family: Dukes of Monfort
- Current region: Italy, Austria
- Origin: Friuli, Italy – March of Friuli, Patriarchate of Aquileia, Holy Roman Empire, Austrian Empire
- Founded: 12th century
- Founder: Enrico, Margrave of Tuscany
- Connected families: Attems of Santa Croce; Attems of Cividale (Extinct); Attems of Udine; Attems Petzenstein
- Distinctions: Prince-Bishops of Lavant; Princes of the Holy Roman Empire; Counts of Attimis; Counts of Gorizia; Counts of Slovenska Bistrica; Counts of Holy Roman Empire; Barons of Lucinico; Barons of Heiligenkreuz; Barons of Pogdora; Barons of Falkenstein; Barons of Tanzenberg; Barons of Petzenstein; Barons of the Habsburg monarchy; Lords of Attimis; Lords of Santa Croce; Archbishops; Bishops

The House of Attems (Attimis in Italian) is an ancient and illustrious parliamentary family from Friuli that held the titles of princes, counts and barons. The family, from the native castle of Attimis, branched off into Italy and Austria in different lineages, each named after different fiefdoms and domains held. It seems certain that the founder of it is Enrico, already Margrave of Tuscany, who in February 1170 was appointed with his brother Arpone among the deacons of the patriarch of Aquileia Woldarico and from this, in the same year, was conferred the castle of Attems or Attimis. The main lines of this family are those of the Attems of the Trident, that branched in the Attems of Cividale (extinct); the Attems of Udine; the Attems of S. Croce; and the Attems Petzenstein, and that of the Attems of the Bear (Extinct).

== History ==
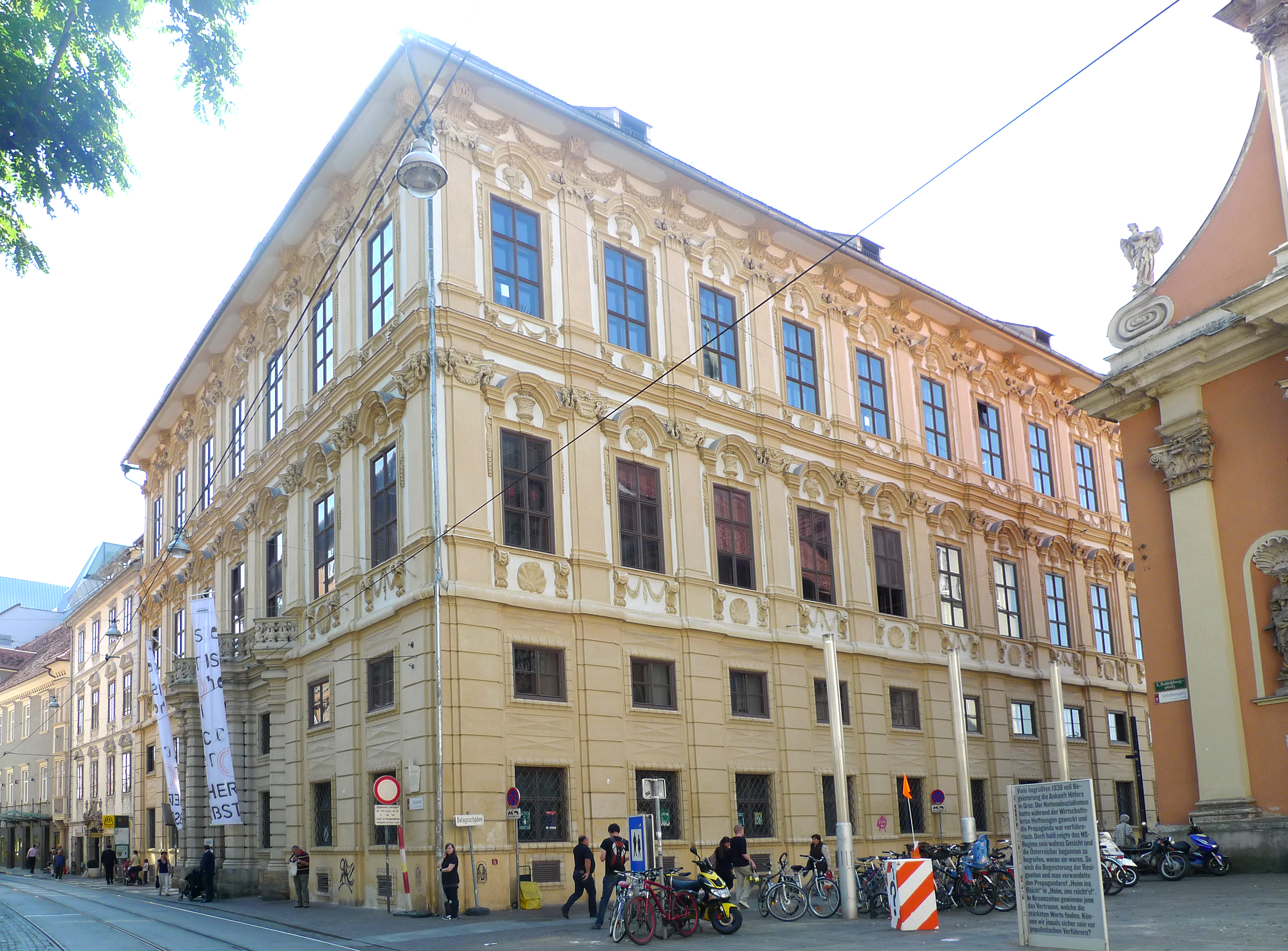
Palais Attems, Graz

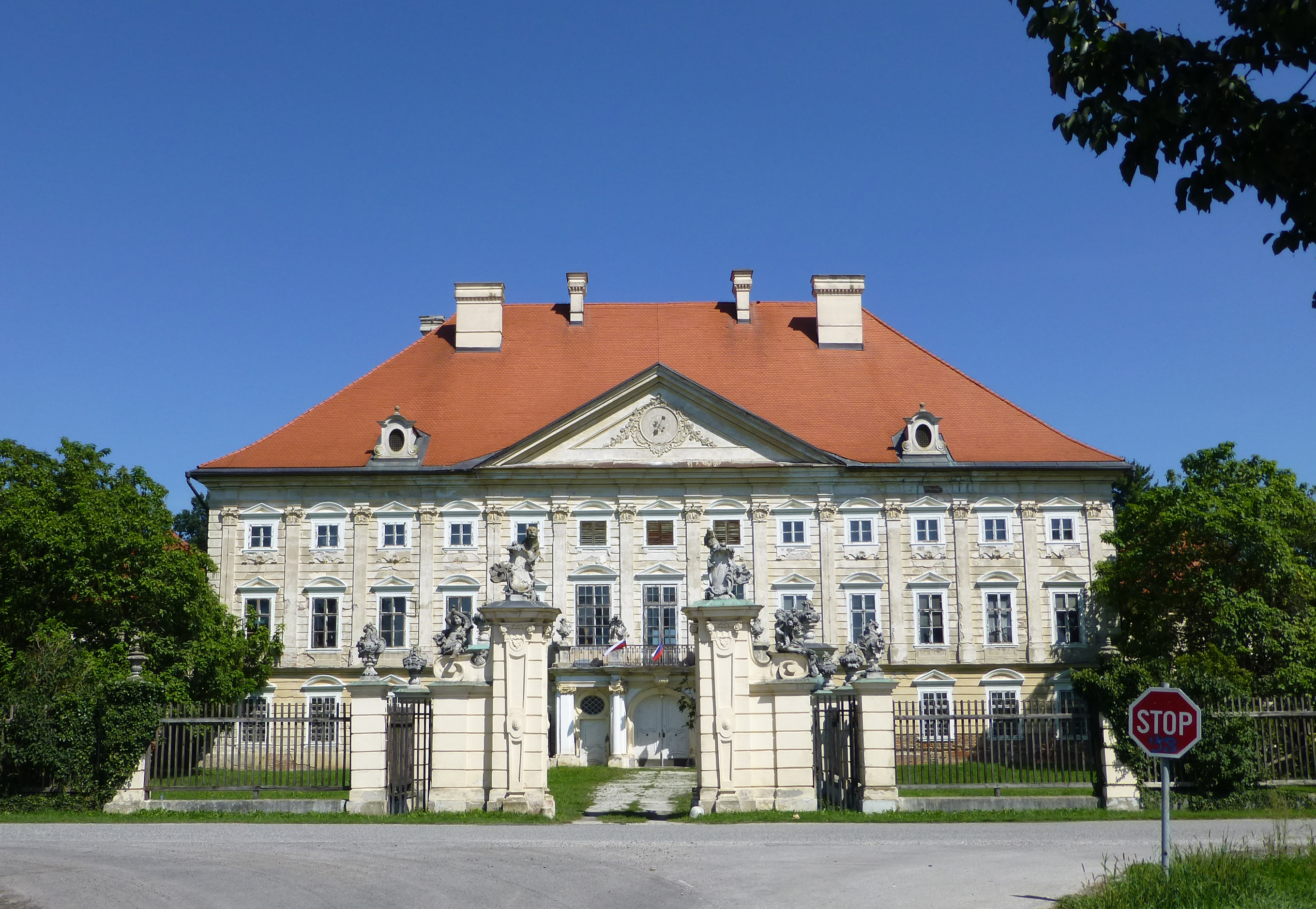
Dornava manor in Slovenia, bought by the Attems family in 1736

The probable origins date back to the counts of Monfort, such sentiment has been displayed by writers such as Wolfgango Lazio, from ancient manuscripts of the library of the princes Landi of the Val di Taro which contains clear history regarding the most illustrious families of Northern Italy and finally, from the ancient papers of the precious deposit of the archives of the Counts of Attems, which more accurately confirm their origin from the Counts of Monfort. From there it is also possible to discern the family's coat-of-arms of the Trident, typical of the Monfort Dukes of Franconia. Enrico, son of Rodolfo, count of Bregenz and Monfort, participated in the wars of Italy led by Frederick I, Holy Roman Emperor. The sons of Rodolfo, Enrico and Arbeno (undoubted descendants of today's Attems of the Trident), were close to the patriarch Vodalrico which was consequently fraternal to the Emperor Frederick both in friendship and in blood.

The town of Attimis was born as a village under the castle of the Lords of Attems. The latter was donated initially by the Marquis of Moosburg i.e. the Archbishop of Salzburg Bertoldo of Moosburg to the Church of Aquileia, i.e. the Patriarchate. It was subsequently conferred to Enrico and Arbeno Attems by the grateful patriarch in recognition of the faithful services provided in the wars with Frederick I. The family had properties and influence among the fiefs of Friuli at the time when the lands were governed by the Patriarchs of Aquileia.

It is certain that Attems (Attimis), already in the eleventh century was a marquisate, even before Enrico and Arbeno had received it as a fief by the patriarch Voldarico. We are equally in the dark as to who and what time this title was conferred.

Two were the castles of Attimis: the Upper and the Lower one. The former is extremely ancient, it is composed of a tower and two turrets. The lower castle was instead built between 1250 and 1260 and its territory was extremely vast. Between its borders it embraced many villages of the promontory, and spread out in the plains until the vicinity of Udine in that territory Raimondo della Torre knighted Enrico son of Alberto count of Gorizia and other Alemannic barons and lords of Friuli.

In 1387 the family was allied, like many others, to the Counts da Camino and to the Princes Da Carrara. The family hired the venture captain Bello di Portogallo and his mercenaries, which, attending compensation for their service, took the Attems' Lower Castle as guarantee. On 10 February 1387 these payments were settled and the stronghold returned. That same year, Udine sent cannons and different military instruments to Attimis for the defence of the lower stronghold, which made it amongst the first ones in Italy to possess such weaponry.

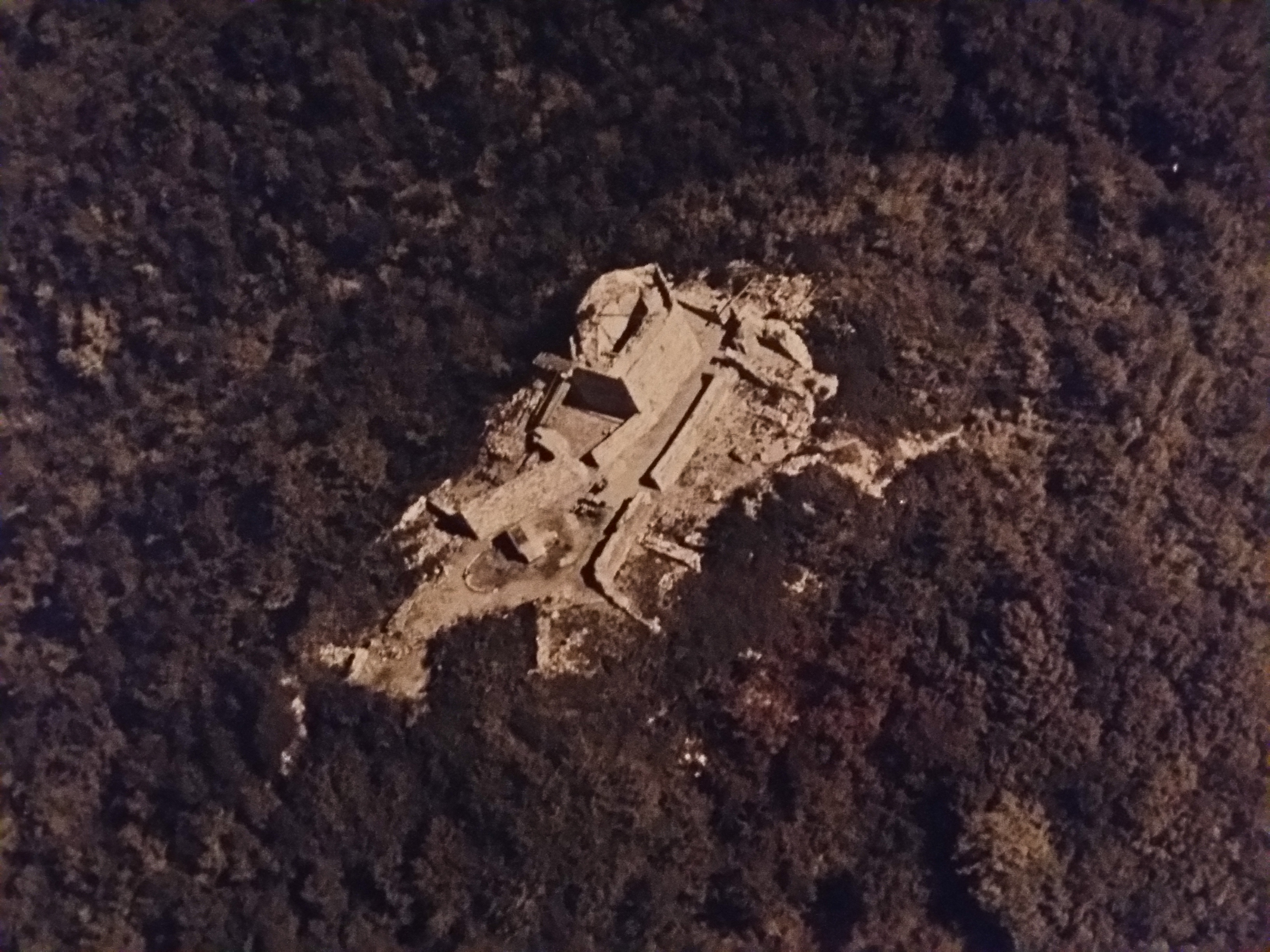
Ruins of the Lower Castle in Attimis, UD. 1972

Meanwhile, the Upper castle of Attimis fell into ruin, and the same faith overtook the lower one not much after (1484) due to widespread utilisation of bombard cannons. In light of such the Attems built at the base of the hill a fortified manor which the Italian branch of the family resided in until 1944 when it was burnt down by the Nazifascist regime.

After the conquest of Friuli by the Republic of Venice and the incorporation into the Domini di Terraferma by 1433, a part of the family remained in Attimis while Frederick of Attems (1447–1521) moved to Gorizia (Görz), where in 1473 he became chancellor to the last Count Leonhard. When the latter's comital line became extinct in 1500, he was confirmed in that office (Count) by the Habsburg emperor Maximilian I and in 1506 even was appointed governor of the Gorizia on behalf of the Inner Austrian archdukes.

Frederick's heirs split into the cadet branches of Heiligenkreuz and Petzenstein. Since then, the Attems family played an important role in the Habsburg monarchy; both lines were elevated to the rank of Freiherren (Barons) in 1605 and given the title of Reichsgrafen (Counts of the Holy Roman Empire) in 1630 (Heiligenkreuz) and 1653 (Petzenstein).

A notable member was Karl Michael von Attems, born in Gorizia on 1 July 1711 He was a canon in the Cathedral of Basel, and in 1750 was named apostolic vicar for the area of the empire belonging to the Patriarchate of Aquileia, for which post, on 24 August 1750, he was named titular Bishop of Pergamum. On 24 April 1752 he was nominated first archbishop of the new Roman Catholic Archdiocese of Gorizia. In 1766 he was named Prince of the Holy Roman Empire by Maria Theresa and Joseph II.

In the Baroque period, the House of Attems was the richest and most influential noble family in the Duchy of Styria. In 1702 Count Ignaz Maria ordered the construction of Palais Attems in Graz, which became home of his extensive art collections; it is today part of the Graz Historic Centre World Heritage Site. In 1861, the heads of the Heiligenkreuz branch were also appointed hereditary members of the Austrian House of Lords.

== Gallery ==
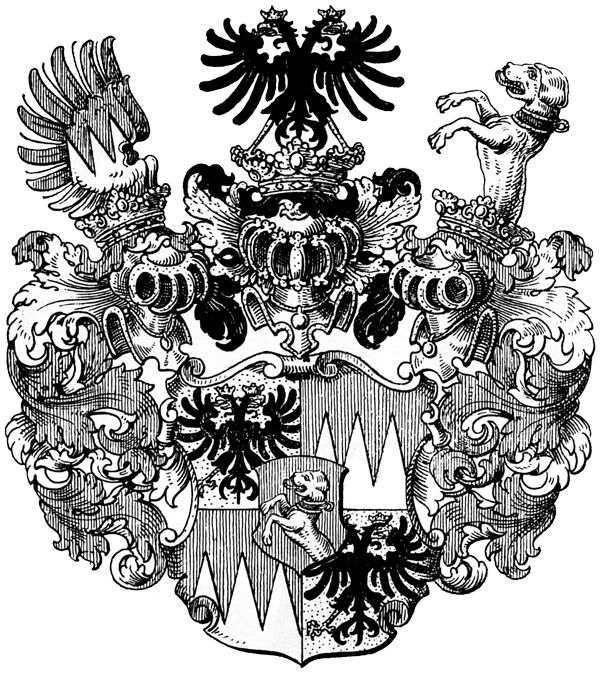
Ornate coat of arms of the Attems Family

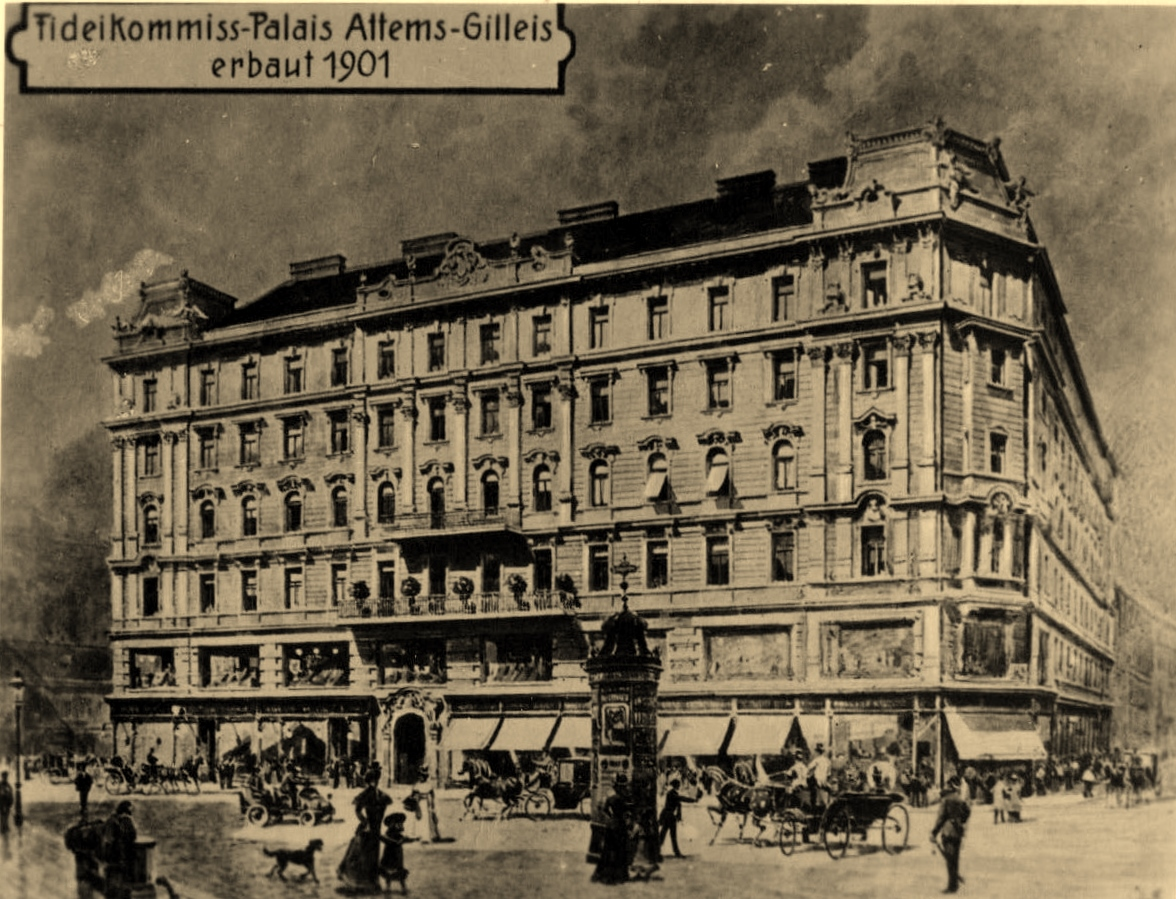
Attems Gilleis Palace

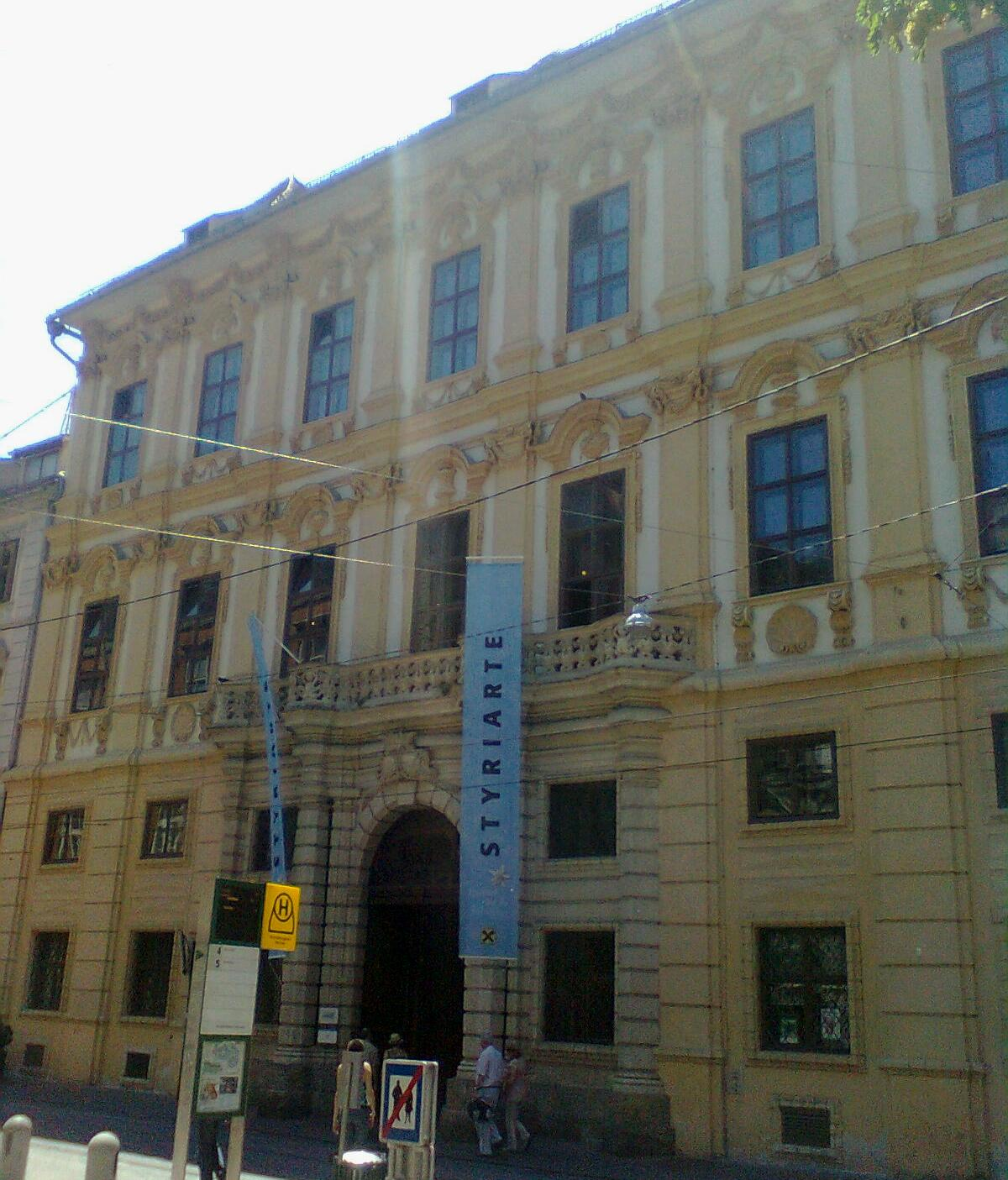
Attems Palace of Graz, main entrance

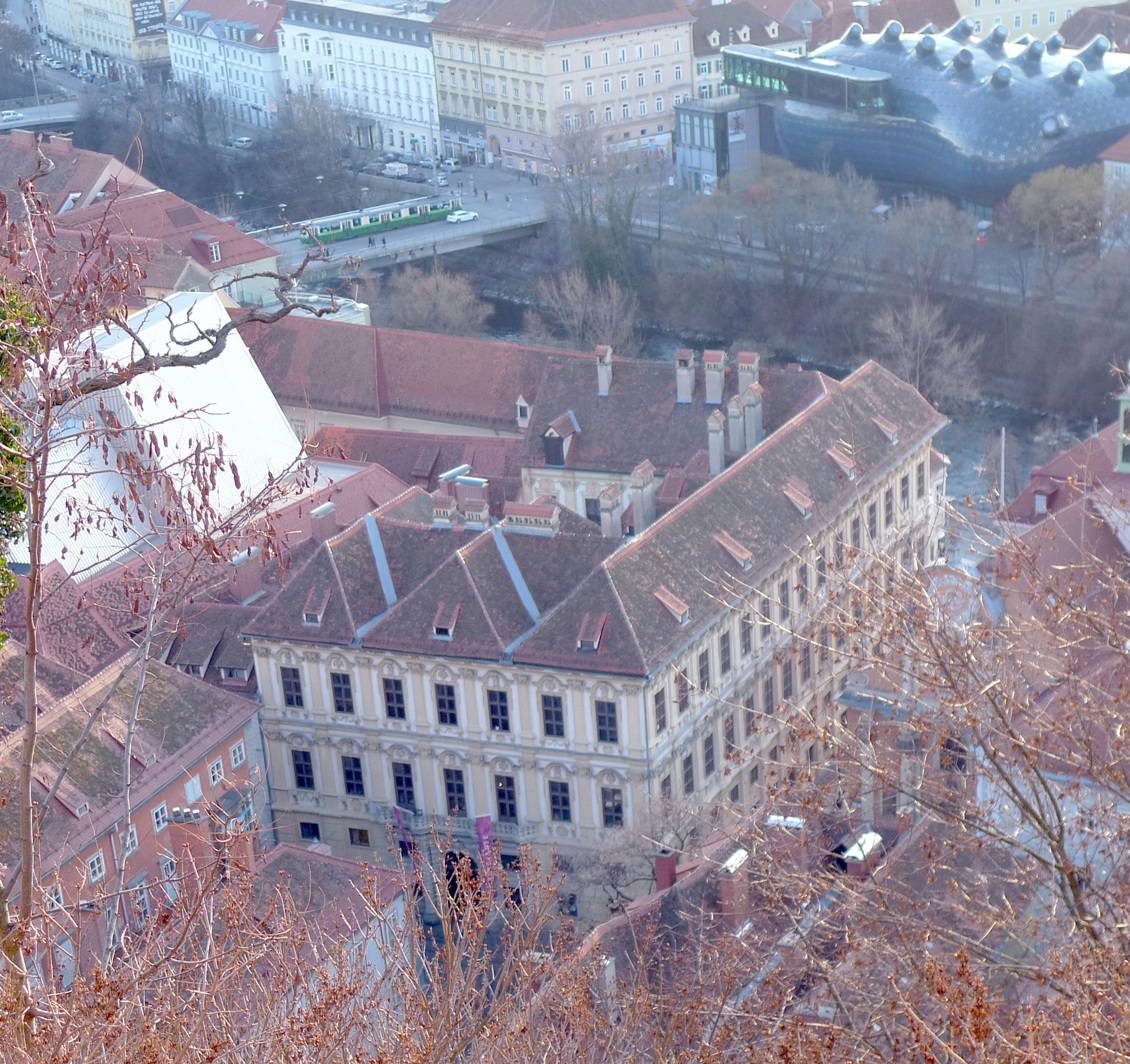
Attems Palace of Graz, from above

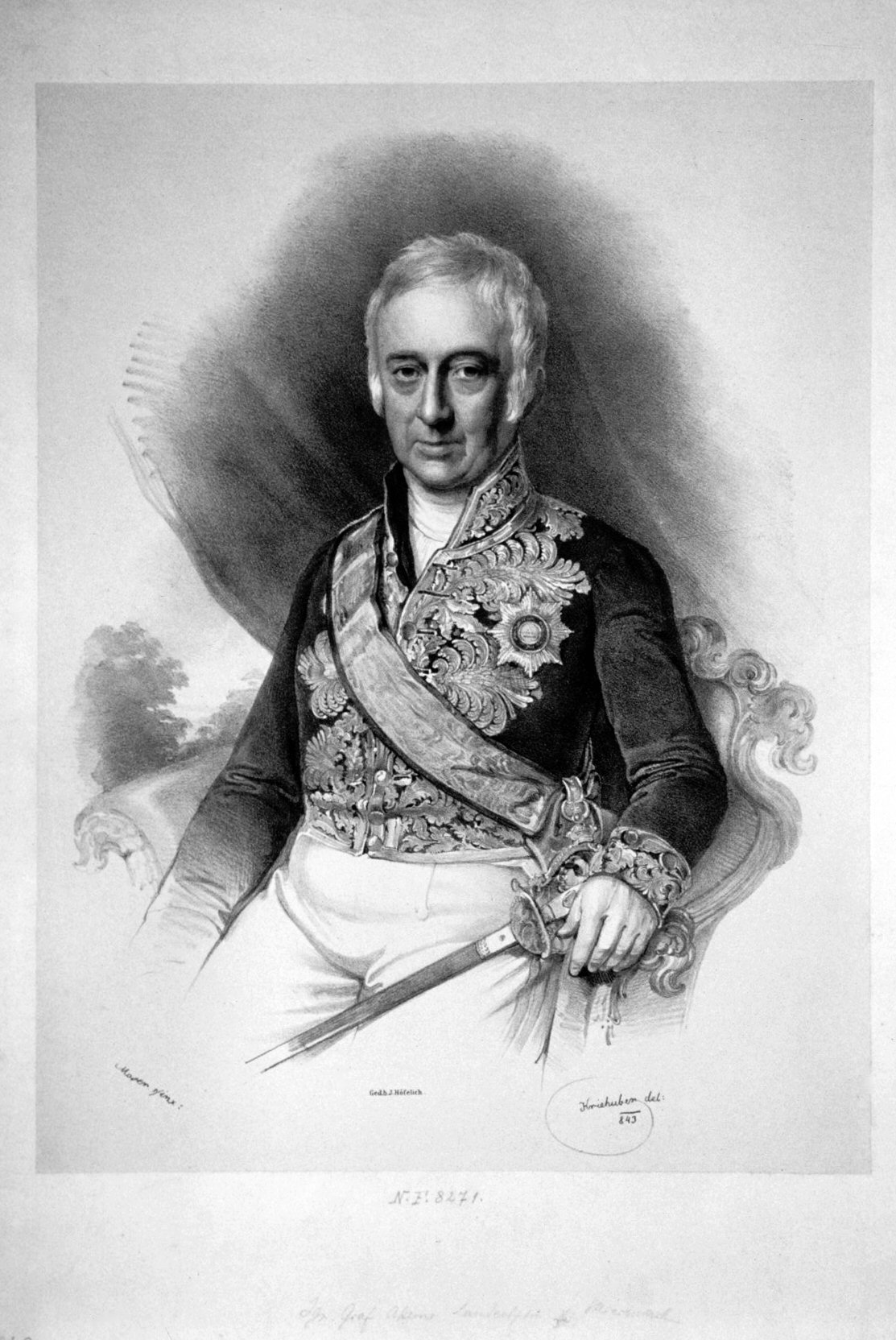
Ignazio Maria Attems

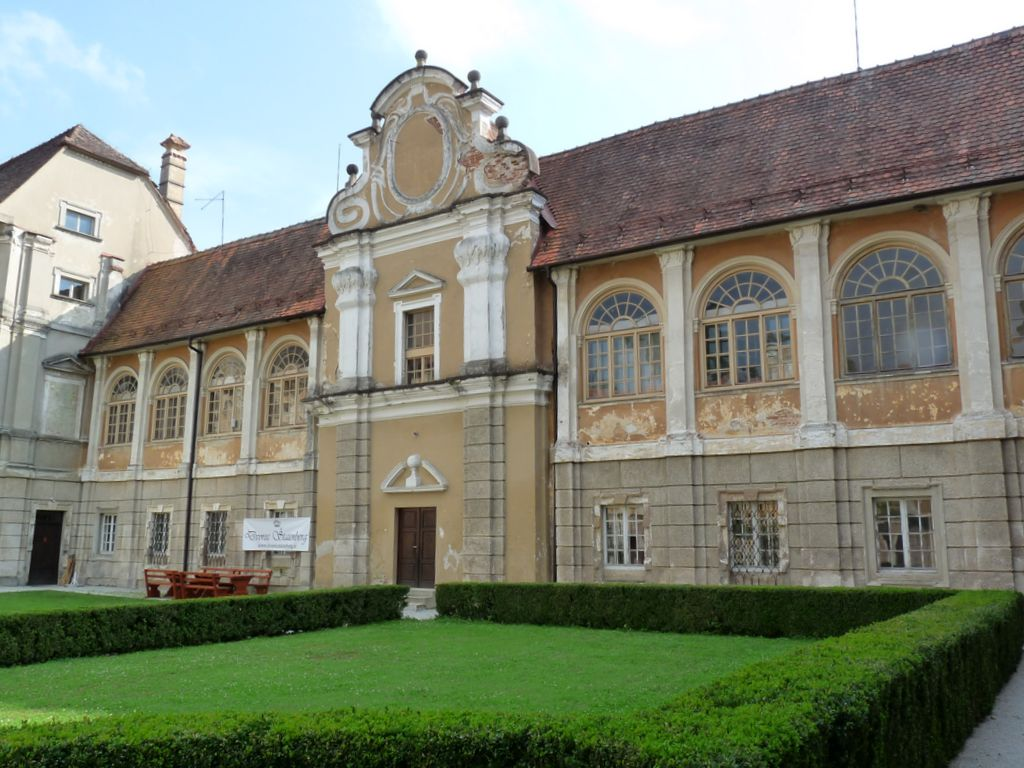
Attems Palace in Statenberg, (Dvorec Štatenberg)

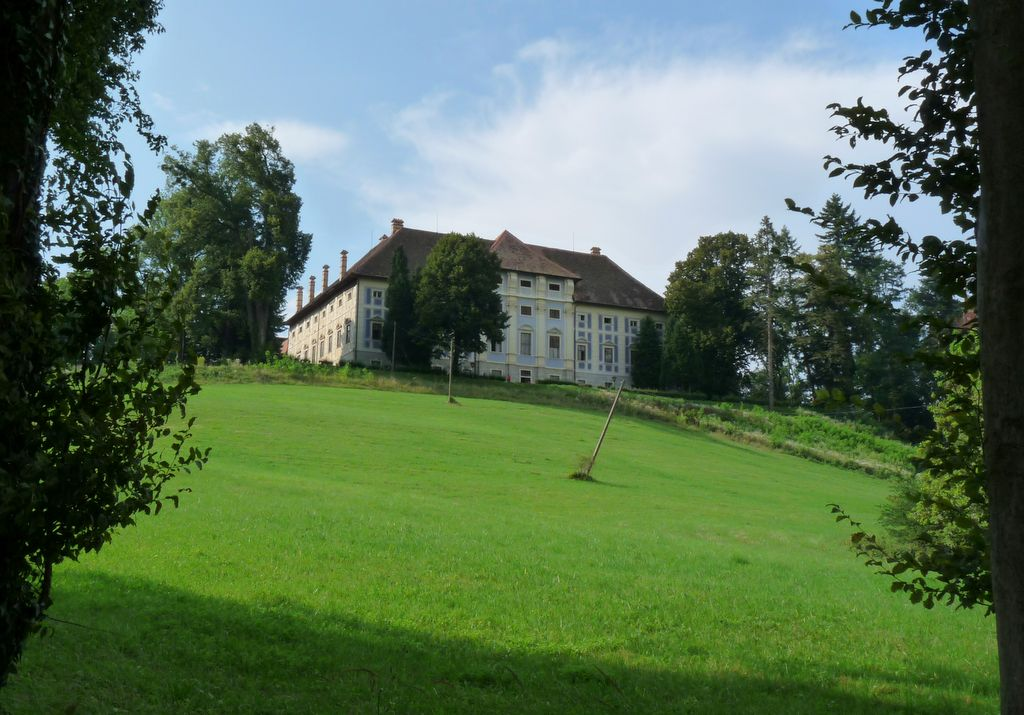
Attems Palace in Statenberg, (Dvorec Štatenberg)

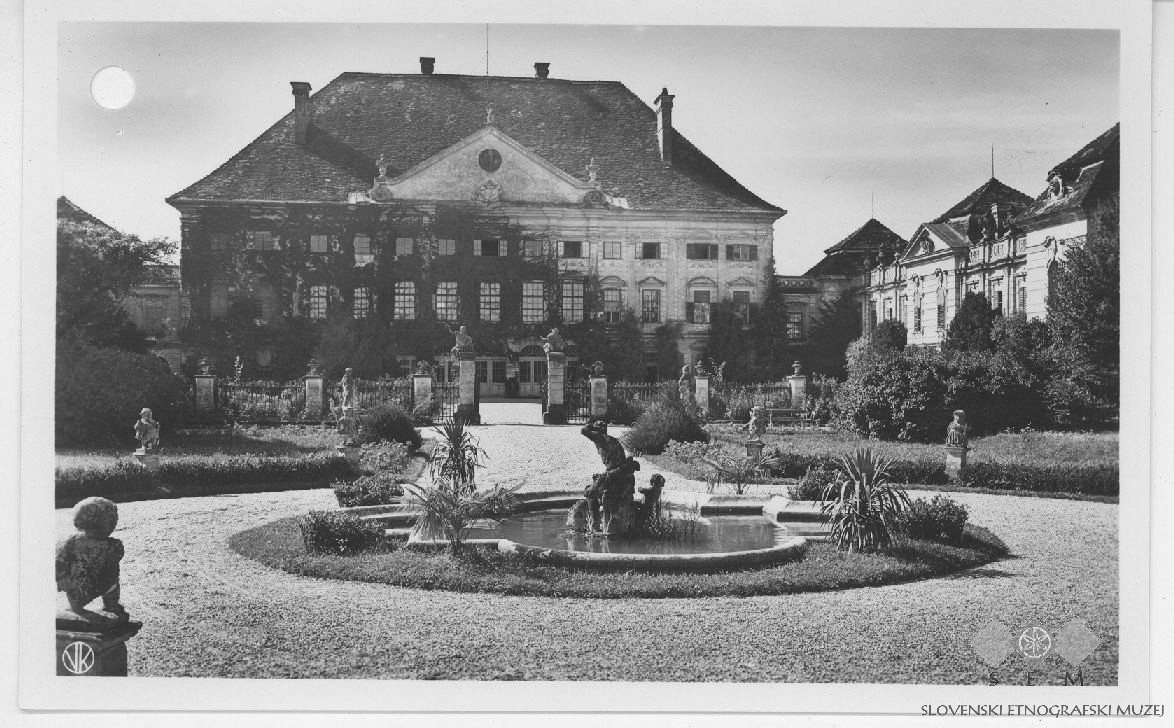
Attems Manor of Dornava, inner court and gardens

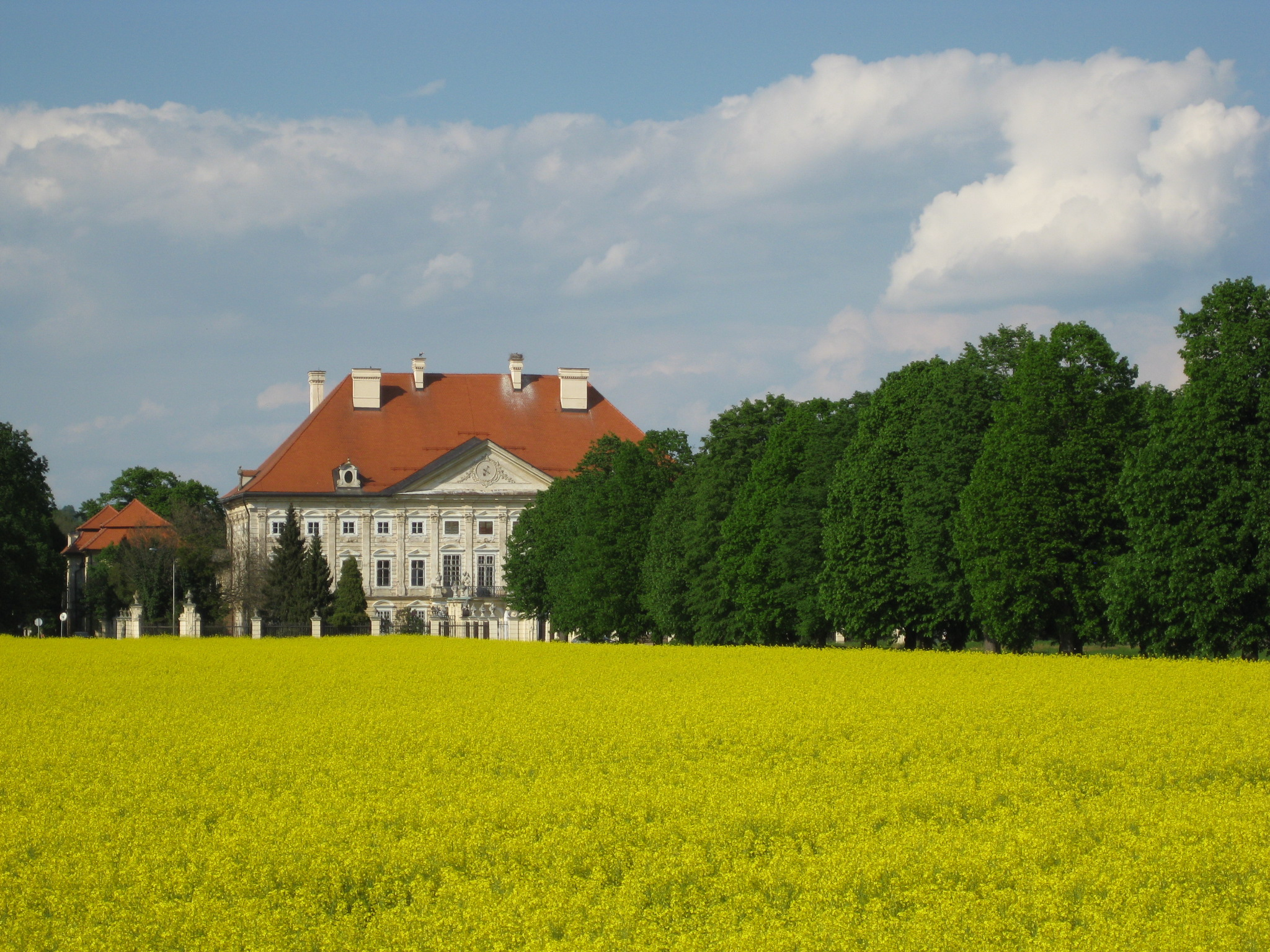
Attems Manor of Dornava, front entry

== Notable historic properties ==
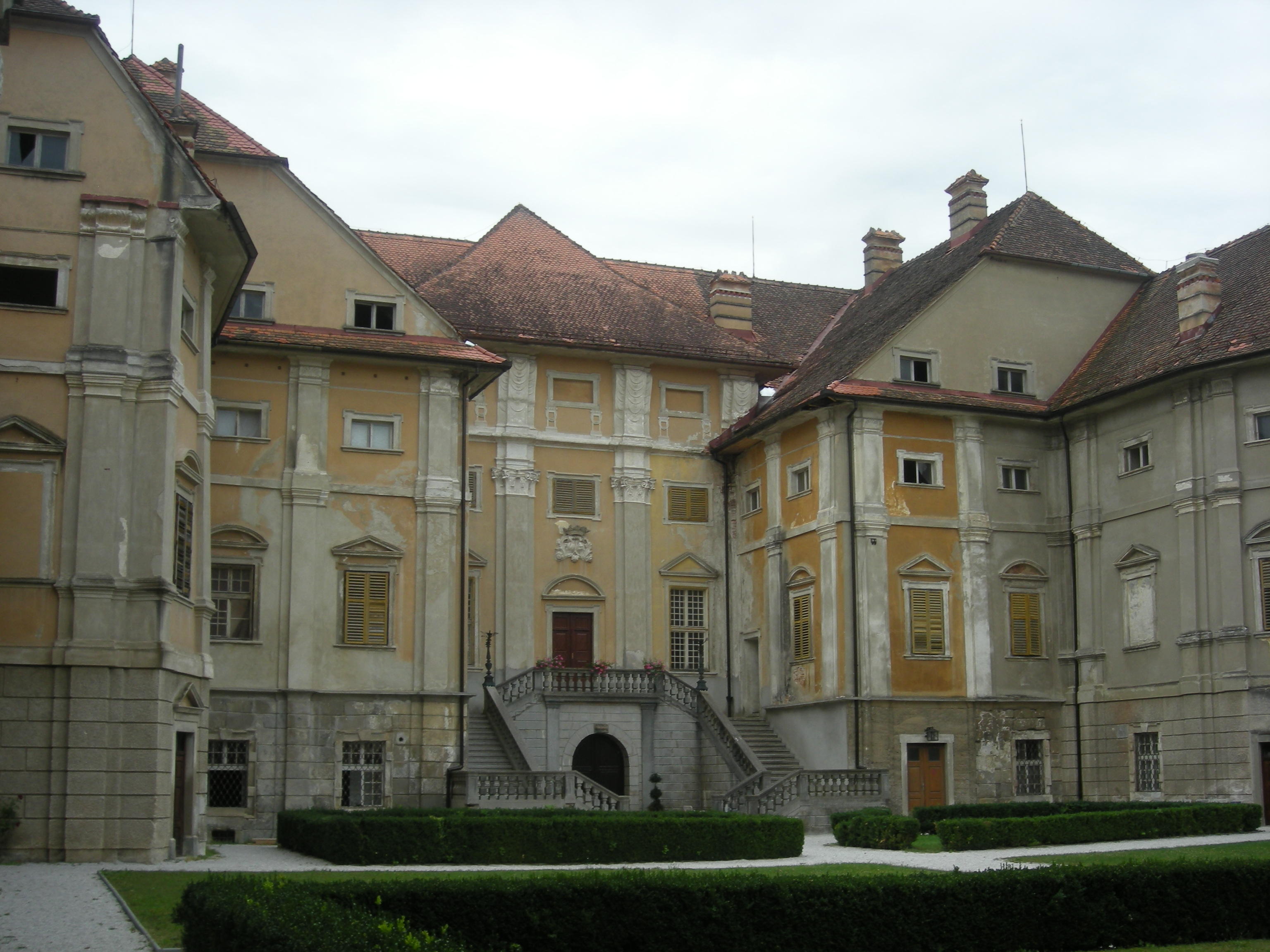
Dvorec Štatenberg's Inner Court, built around 1740 by Ignazio Maria von Attems

- Schloss Štatenberg: The summer residence of the Counts of Attems.

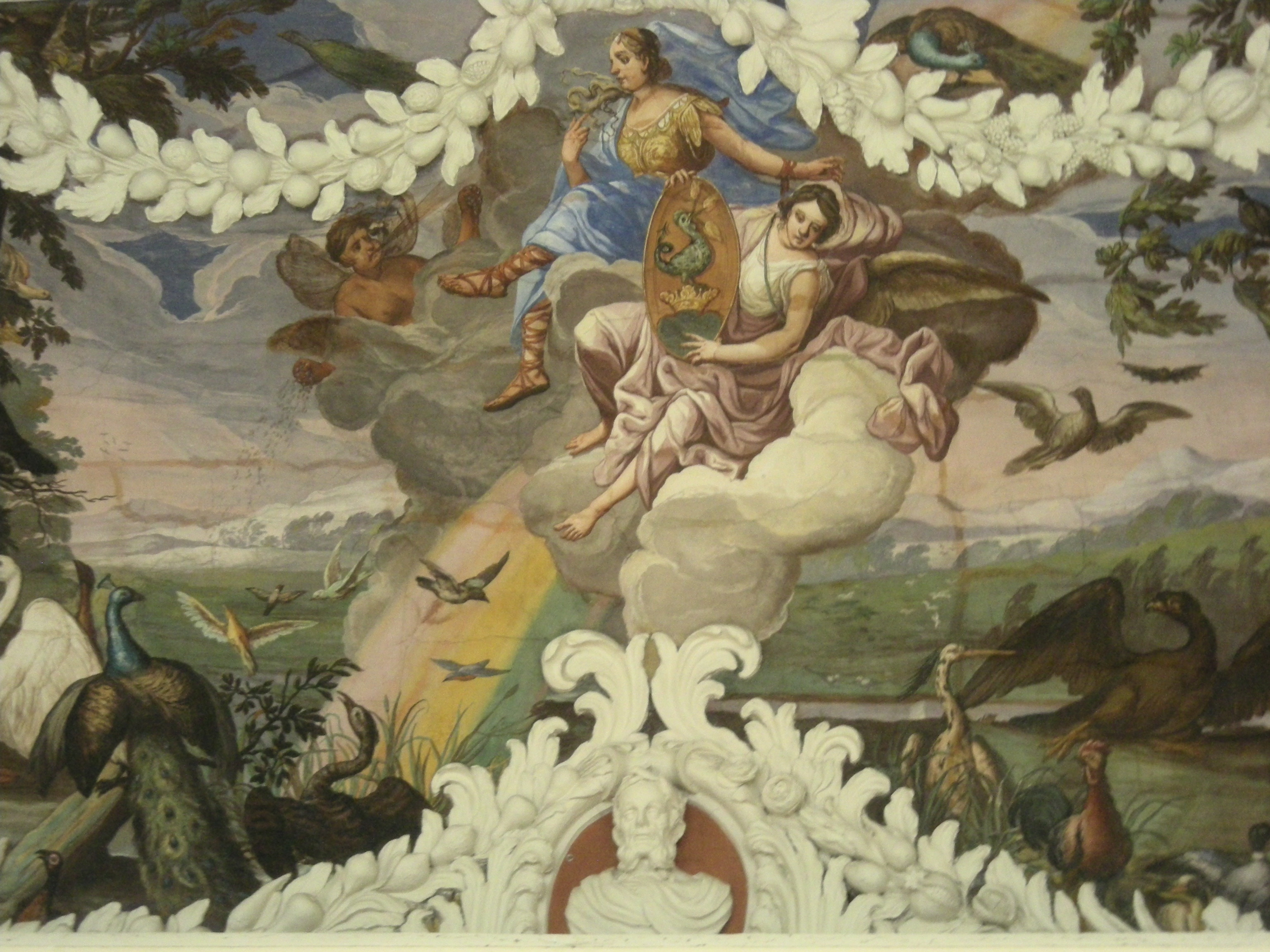
Dvorec Štatenberg, Frescoes

In the countryside of Štajerska we find one of the most beautiful chateaux of the Baroque period on Slovenian territory. The building was constructed at the end of the 17th century and completed around 1740 by Ignazio Maria von Attems, from the branch Attems-Petzenstein. The Palace is found about 15 km south of Slovenska Bistrica, where the family owned a castle in the city centre (then nationalised by the Yugoslavian state after the second world war). The house consists of an Italian baroque-style garden, remarkable stuccoes and frescoes, particularly found in the knight's hall.

- Palace Attems Petzenstein of Gorizia

The Attems Petzenstein Palace, located in the center of the city of Gorizia near Piazza della Vittoria, was built in the first half of the 18th century by the Attems family. The structure built on the basis of a project by architect Nicolò Pacassi, characterized by a style of transition between the baroque and the rococò, was subjected to neoclassical restructuring in the first half of the nineteenth century, which made the original features of the façade unrecognizable. The seven statues that surmount it, representing subjects of Olympus, are the work of the Bergamo sculptor Giovanni Battista Mazzoleni. The historical and artistic heritage of this building, as well as being represented by the various stuccos and frescoes dating back to the last part of the eighteenth and nineteenth centuries, is also enhanced by the canvas depicting "Gli dei dell'Olimpo" located on the ceiling of the great internal hall, attributed to the painter Antonio Paroli (1745). Also interesting is the internal Italian-style garden with the fountain of the Hercules in the center. The Pinacoteca of Palazzo Attems Petzenstein counts works by some masters of the eighteenth century Veneto, many nineteenth-century portraits (including some paintings by Giuseppe Tominz) and a collection of works of the twentieth century (among the authors we find Italico Brass, Luigi Spazzapan, Tullio Crali and Vittorio Bolaffio).

- Dornava Manor

Donava Manor belonged to the Lords of Ptuj (the Herbersteins and Sauers) in the Middle Ages. In 1730, it was bought by Count Dizma Attems and redesigned as a baroque park and garden. Ptuj is one of the oldest towns in Slovenia and was part of the Austro-Hungarian empire.

- Palace Attems of Graz

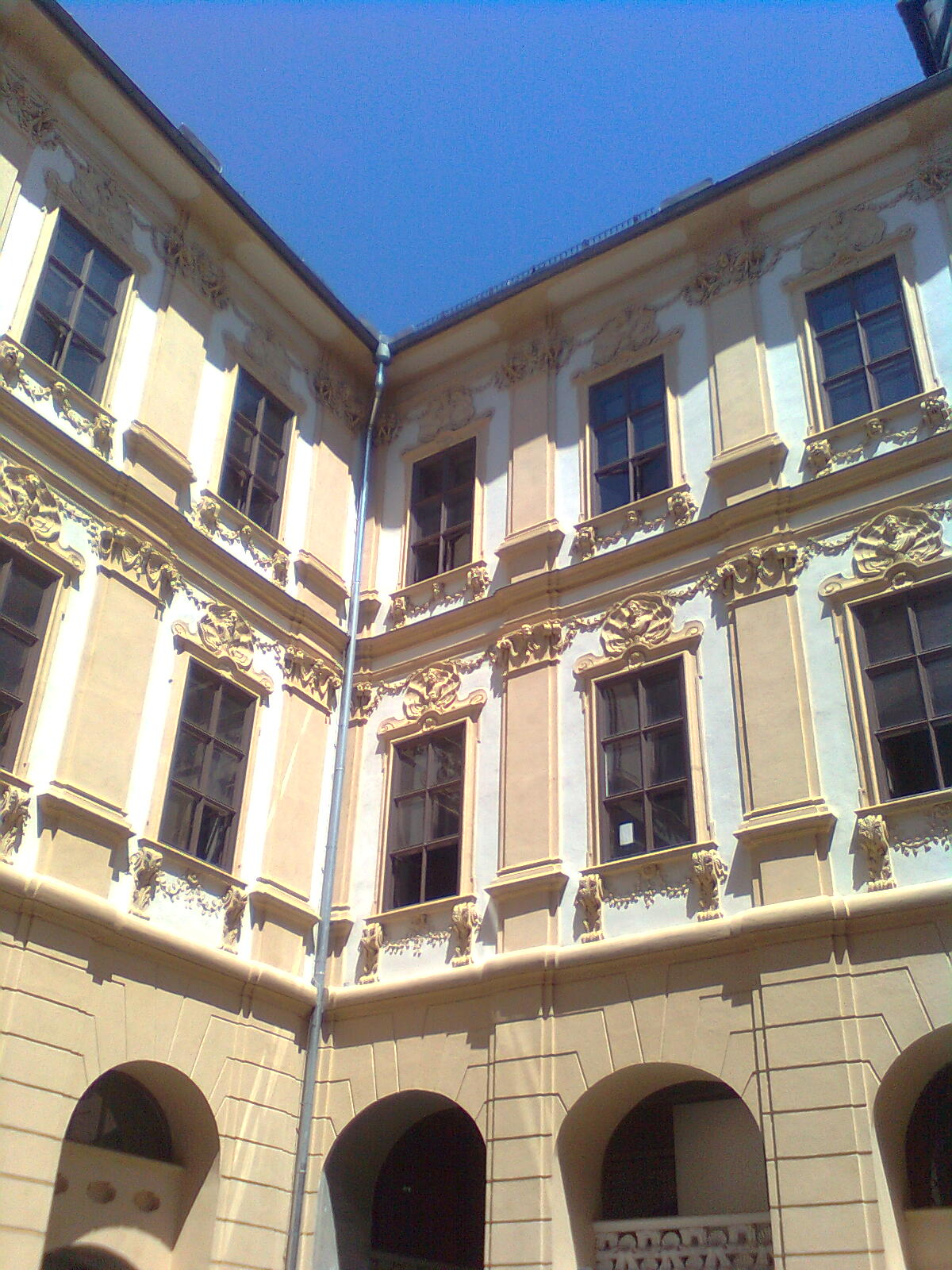
Inner Court, Palace Attems of Graz, built around 1716 by Ignazio Maria von Attems

Ignazio Maria von Attems, the founder of the Graz line of the noble family Attems from Friuli-Italy, acquired six town houses between 1687 and 1702, which stood on the site of the present palace. He commissioned the architect Johann Joachim Carlone with the construction of a city palace. Andreas Stengg is presumed to be another involved master builder. The work lasted from 1702 to 1716. The U-shaped, blocky building with four storeys encloses a square courtyard. The Baroque facade is richly decorated with stucco work by Domenico Boscho, both on the street side and in the courtyard. The façade design was influenced by northern Italian palace buildings. The lower floors have been combined to form a base zone and have windows with rustic stone framing. On the two upper floors, the windows are provided with brow arch suspensions and stuccoed vases. The upper façade storeys are separated from the lower zone by ionic and composite pilasters, between which a belt cornice runs. In the interior of the palace, the stucco is decorated with gold, silver and copper plating. The ceiling and super portrait pictures contain representations from the Old Testament and an ancient mythological motives. The pieces of the extensive art collection were lost in the postwar period.

- Palace Attems of Santa Croce

Built in 1740 on the design of architect Nicolò Pacassi, the building currently houses the headquarters of the Municipality of Gorizia. Of the original configuration of Palazzo Attems there is only the general structure, the internal staircase and its loggia that overlooks the back garden. During the nineteenth and twentieth centuries the building was extensively renovated, resulting partially modified both in the distribution structure and in the facade design. The configuration of the staircase body reveals the influence of the Venetian architectural tradition of the seventeenth century. The lower level is characterised by a compact wall, while at the level above it opens a loggia punctuated by Ionic columns. The building is embellished in the rear part of a garden, from the original eighteenth-century plant, then modified in the nineteenth century, currently considerably smaller than the original extension.

- Villa Attems Cernozza de Postcastro

The property Villa Attems Cernozza de Postcastro is documented at the end of the 15th century as owned by the ancient noble family from Gorizia “dei Postcastro”. The property was inherited by the family “dai Cernozza”. The Baroness Beninia Cernozza de Postcastro will marry Massimiliano Attems in 1649 making the property patrimony of the Attems family.

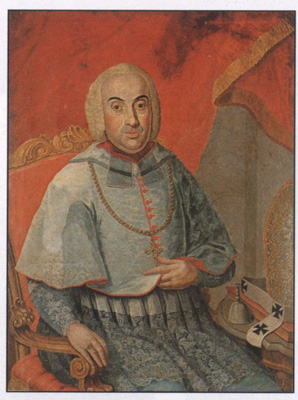
Karl Michael Count Attems (Carlo Michele Conte Attems - Italian). Archbishop of Gorizia and Prince of the Holy Roman Empire.

== Notable members ==
Notable individuals from the Attems family include the following:

- Anton Attems (1834–1891), an Austrian baron and politician
- Ermest Amadeus Thomas Attems (1694–1757), bishop of Ljubljana
- Ferdinand von Attems (1746–1820), Count Governor of Styria, Baron of Sveti Križ (Heiligenkreuz/Santa Croce)
- Ignatius Maria Attems (1774–1861), Governor of Styria, Baron of Sveti Križ
- Joseph Oswald von Attems (1679–1744), Bishop of Lavant
- Karl Michael von Attems (1707–1774), Archbishop of Gorizia and Prince of the Holy Roman Empire
- Ottokar Maria von Attems (1815–1867), Bishop of Seckau
- Carl Attems (1868–1952), Austrian myriapodologist.

== Books ==
The Attems family lineage can be found in several books:

- Annuaro della Nobilità Italiana
- The Austrian State Archives
- Deutsches Adelslexikon
- Genealogisches Handbuch des Adels GHdA
