= Goričane, Moravče =

Goričane
- Location in Slovenia
- Coordinates: 46°8′47″N 14°48′24″E
- Country: Slovenia
- Traditional region: Upper Carniola
- Statistical region: Central Slovenia
- Municipality: Moravče
- Elevation: 448 m (1,470 ft)

Goričane (Slovene pronunciation: [ɡɔˈɾiːtʃanɛ]) is a former settlement in the Municipality of Moravče in central Slovenia. It is now part of the village of Peče. The area is part of the traditional region of Upper Carniola. The municipality is now included in the Central Slovenia Statistical Region.

== Geography ==
Goričane lies southwest of the village center of Peče.

== History ==
Goričane had a population of 20 living in three houses in 1880, and 18 in three houses in 1900. Goričane was annexed by Peče in 1952, ending its existence as an independent settlement.
