= Porzûs massacre =

1945 killings in Italy

Coordinates: 46°11′22.97″N 13°22′59.79″E

The Porzûs massacre (Italian: eccidio di Porzûs, Friulian: ecidi di Purçûs, Slovene: pokol v Porčinju) was an intra-partisan massacre of the Italian resistance during late World War II, on 7 February 1945. It saw the killings of 17 partisans belonging to the Brigate Osoppo, a strongly Catholic formation, by communist partisans of the Gruppi di Azione Patriottica. Four members of Brigate Osoppo were killed when a group of them was ambushed, while the survivors were taken prisoner and summarily executed in the following days. The event is still the object of study and controversy in Italy.

== History ==
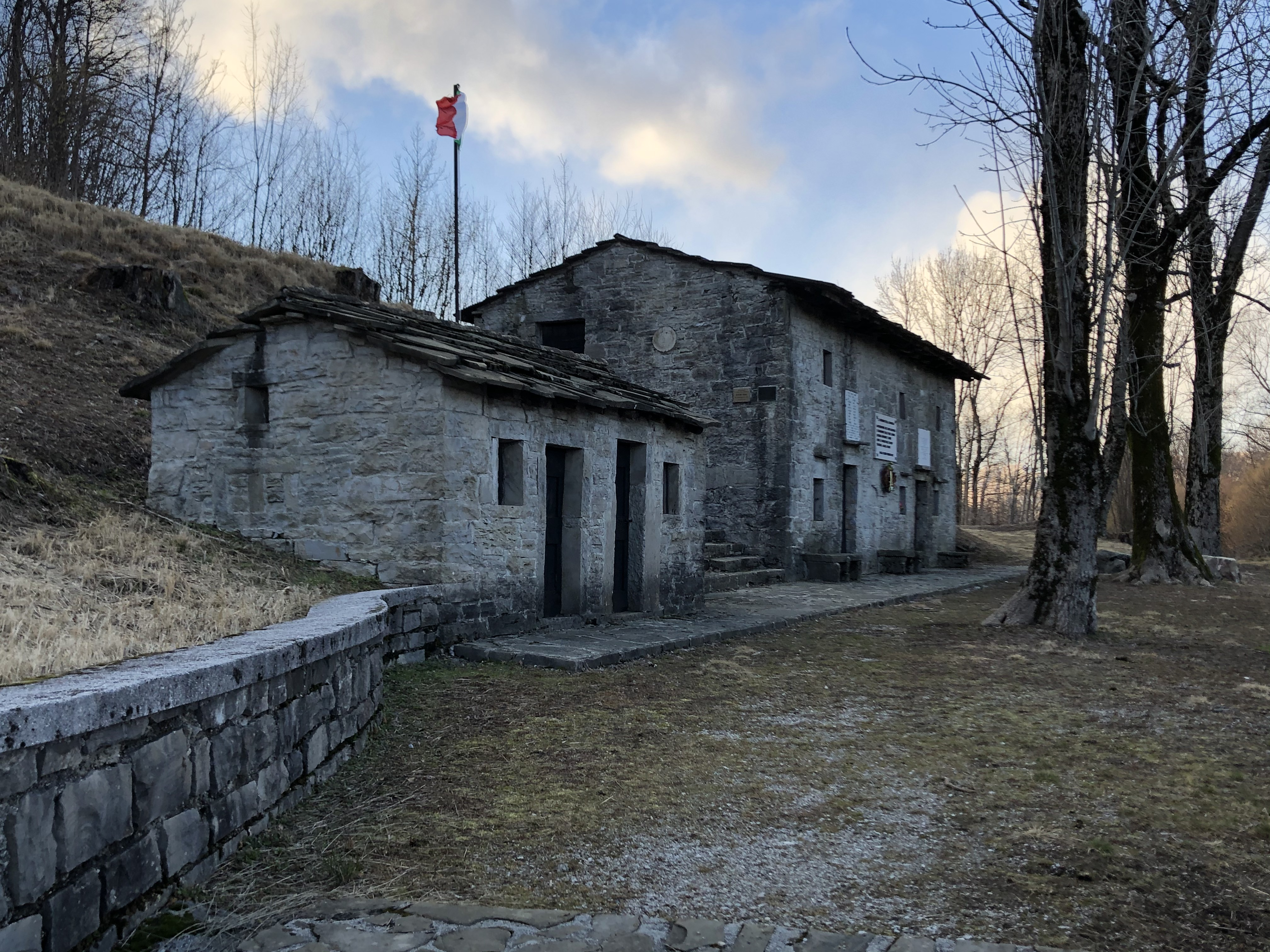
Malghe di Porzûs

On 7 February 1945 a group of Communist partisans belonging to the Gruppi di Azione Patriottica (GAP), led by Mario Toffanin (nom de guerre Giacca), a man blamed for theft in 1940, reached the command of the Group of the Eastern Brigade of the partisan division Osoppo, near the malghe of Porzûs, in the comune of Faedis, eastern Friuli, with the goal to arrest and execute their members.

Toffanin accused the Osoppo Brigade of hindering the collaboration with the Yugoslavian partisans, led by Josip Broz Tito, of having failed to distribute to the other partisans weapons sent by the Allies and, above all, of having had contacts with the army of the fascist government, in particular Decima Flottiglia MAS and the regiment of volunteers "Tagliamento", in the attempt to avoid occupation and annexation of Friuli-Venezia Giulia and Istria by Yugoslavia after the collapse of Germany. Furthermore, the brigade Osoppo had given shelter to Elda Turchetti, a young woman who had been listed by BBC radio among German spies. Incidentally, this young woman had been handed over to Osoppo by Giacca in order to be examined and eventually put to death. However, she had been found not guilty. In fact, BBC radio was not always fully reliable in this kind of information because of disinformation carried out by German intelligence.

== Reconciliation between the Garibaldini and Osoppo partisans ==
On 8 August 2002, in the place of the massacre, two former partisan commanders, Giovanni Padoan, battle name "Vanni" (Cormons, 25 June 1909 – 31 December 2007), a former Political commissar of the Garibaldi Natisone Brigade, and Father Bello, a catholic priest and a former commander into the Osovan Partisans, met and eventually reconciled the two factions. At the meeting, Padoan denied his personal involvement in the matter, stating that on that day he was at the Yugoslav Partisan headquarters of Cerkno/Circhina, but took responsibility for the massacre, offered his apology and asked forgiveness to the survivors and victims’ relatives. He also stated that, although the order came directly from the IX Yugoslav Army Corps, the executors were Italian GAP members under the command of the Udine Federation of the Italian Communist Party. He added that Mario Toffanin, whom he defined a “narrow-minded-man” who had to carry on the operation, wanted this order to be endorsed by the Udine Federation of the Communist Party. The orders were approved by two communist leaders of the Udine Federation, Modesti and Tambosso. Father Bello stated during his speech, that the orders indeed came from the Yugoslav IX corpus, but also that Palmiro Togliatti, the leader of the Italian Communist Party, gave his approval. In addition, Padoan reported that the apologies should have been offered during the first trial in Lucca, where he was acquainted, but at the time the international situation and the Cold War, did not allowed such a move. On 10 February 2003, during another official remembrance ceremony, he reiterated the apologies and excuses. Giovanni Padoan received a thirty-year sentence by the Appeal Court during the second trial of 1959, a sentence that was confirmed by the Italian Supreme Court. Before the sentence was passed, the communist party sent him to Czechoslovakia and then to Romania. He was granted amnesty in 1959, and returned to his native Cormons where he died in 2007. Mario Lizzero detto Andrea (Mortegliano, 28 giugno 1913 – Udine, 11 dicembre 1994) The others Osoppo partisans killed at Porzus, whose names are enshrined on the memorial that commemorates the massacre where: Ado, Guidone, Aragona, Make, Ateone, Massimo, Barletta, Porthos, Cagliari Rapido, Cariddi, Rinato, Ermes, Roberto, Flavio, Toni, Gruaro and Vandalo.

== Aftermath ==
The Osoppo-Friuli Brigades were autonomous partisan groups founded at the headquarters of the Archiepiscopal Seminary of Udine on 24 December 1943, on the initiative of laypersons liberal, socialist and Catholic inspired volunteers, some groups already active after 8 September 1943 in the Carnia and Friuli areas. The Osoppo partisans were accused by the communists of collusion with enemy, particularly with famous or infamous “Decima Flottiglia MAS” of Junio Valerio Borghese, and also to oppose the Yugoslav Resistance movement. During the last months of the war, the Xª MAS units were deployed to the eastern Italian border against Josip Broz Tito's partisans who marched into Istria and Venezia Giulia. It was rumored that Borghese was attempting to arrange a deal with non-Communist partisan units in order to prevent and stop the Italian loss of Istria and the Slovene Littoral that by 1944–1945 were becoming more evident. The Garibaldi Brigades were partisan brigades organized by the Italian Communist Party operating in the Italian resistance during the Second World War. The brigade operating since October 1943, in the Julian Pre-Alps and Carnic Pre-Alps theater, was the 1st "Friuli" Garibaldi Brigade. On 20 September 1944 the Slovenian Popular Army headquarters unilaterally abolished the agreements with the CLN of April 1944, which included a Slovenian-Italian "Joint Command" on these units. By this act, the Italian units were now under, not only operational, the Slovenian Popular Army. In some cases serious problems of collaboration between Italian partisans and the formations of the Slovenian People's Liberation Army arose on the eastern border, where the strong Slovenian nationalist ideas, the difficulties of the Italian communist leaders and the contradictory aspects of their politics favoured anti-Slavic divisions and resentments in the non-communist Resistance forces. A few days before the massacre, a British Liaison Officer attached to the Slovenian Partisans sent a report to the Foreign Office in London. In his report, the Liaison Officer stated that the unit which he was attached to had just taken as prisoners some other Italian Partisans belonging to the Osoppo Brigade. When he asked the reason for that, he was told by a Partisan Officer that he had been instructed by his seniors, and that any obstruction by the British mission would have caused their sending away from the unit. Following this event the Liaison Officer concluded that the Communist Partisans were about to attack the Osoppo Partisans. The Report was then sent to the Foreign Office who immediately asked to Fitzroy Maclean, head of the MACMIS, to raise the matter directly with Tito. At the end of the war, the allies and the Italian National Liberation Committee ordered all the Italian Partisan Brigades to disband and to hand over all their armaments. However the Communist partisans did not completely obey; some sources estimate that at least forty percent of the weapons were kept in secret stashes by the Communists who did not trust the new government, and for an envisioned Communist revolution. Seven years later, in 1952, Mario Toffanin, along with 36 former GAP members, were sentenced to serve 777 years in jail for the Porzûs massacre. At that time, Toffanin was living in Prague working as a welder; the other GAP sentenced members served little or no time at all in jail, due to amnesties. The Osoppo Commander, Francesco De Gregori, was posthumously awarded with the Silver Medal. Elda Turchetti was cleared by the allegations of being a spy during the trial in Lucca.
