= Mario Toffanin =

Italian Communist partisan (1912–1999)

Mario Toffanin a.k.a. his nom de guerre "Giacca" (English “Jacket”) (Padua, 9 November 1912 – Sežana (Slovenia), 22 January 1999) was an Italian Communist partisan and responsible for the Porzûs massacre.

== Early years ==
Born in Padua into a Venetian working-class family, he moved to Trieste at the age of seven, where his father was employed at the dockyards “Cantieri San Marco” whom Italy had just acquired after the Victorious war with Austria-Hungary. The family settled in the populous suburb of San Giacomo (St James) of Trieste, a neighborhood considered the red-heart of the Trieste working class, where socialists and then communists ideas thrived. The young Mario grew up listening to songs like “Bandiera Rossa” and "The International" which were commonly sung in the local bars by the residents. When in 1922 the Fascist regime came to power, San Giacomo became one of the targets of the Fascist militiamen expeditions, aimed to punish the “reds”. It is possible that Toffanin often witnessed confrontation between the two groups, which at the time were almost on a daily basis, in the local square or campo, the center of the neighborhood. In 1927 he was affiliated to the Italian Communist Party, which had been outlawed by the regime the previous year, to become a full member in 1933.

== World War 2 and partisan struggle ==
He worked at San Marco dockyards from 1927 until 1940, when he was drafted into the Royal Italian Army. His military service lasted only three months, before beings discharged on medical grounds. Upon his discharge, and prior to the entrance of Italy in the Second World War, he went into hiding in the Kingdom of Yugoslavia, where he joined the underground Communist Organization. When the axis powers invaded Yugoslavia in 1941, the Yugoslav communist party quickly activated him to help organize the underground forces, although the Yugoslavs and the international communists, did not join the war against the axis forces until the invasion of USSR of 22 June 1941. After the axis invasion, he saw action with the partisan forces from 1941 to 1943 in Croatia, where he was captured on 20 April 1943. Nevertheless, he managed to escape after four months of detention in the Zemun concentration Camp near Belgrade, along with a group of 28 partisans, just few days before being transfer to Germany.

With the Italian surrender of 8 September 1943 the overall situation in the Italian eastern provinces changed. These provinces had been annexed in 1918 after the dissolution of the Austrian-Hungarian Empire, and had a multiethnic population. Although by the 1940s the Italian component was a majority in the main cities, the number of the Italian ethnic group had been increased with the arrival of many other Italians from the other parts of Italy, and by the family policy of the Fascist regime, the Slovenian and Croatian ethnic groups were still a visible minority and an overwhelming majority, in the internal villages next to the kingdom of Yugoslavia border.

During the late 1920s and early 1930s the Italian security forces and Fascist militia, were actively engaged in suppressing the Slavic nationalist movements, and special laws were passed to deal with the problem. The area was considered not completely loyal to Italy, and the enforcement of a policy of forced Italianization did not help the assimilation of the new subjects. With the outbreak of the war, and the 1941 invasion of Yugoslavia, the situation quickly deteriorated. Slovenian and Croatian conscripts drafted into the Royal Italian Army were forbidden to serve in the area, and by 1942 most of them, who served in non-combatant units called “Special Battalions” largely deployed in southern Italy and Sardinia, were also denied furloughs, to prevent their desertion. Indeed, the Italian Armed forced suffered several cases of desertion of these non-Italian soldiers, who in some cases joined the partisans units, as Janko Premrl, brother in law of the Italian/Slovenian novelist, Boris Pahor did.

Mario Toffanin was considered by the Yugoslavs a loyal communist and a true and expert revolutionary, and in view of the new scenario created by the Italian capitulation he was sent as Yugoslav agent, to Trieste then occupied and administrated by the Germans. There, he organized and led the local Partisan units or GAP (Gruppi di Azione Patriottica), which were linked to the Yugoslav Communists. It was in Trieste that he earned his battle name “Giacca” or “Jacket”, probably because the day he reported there, he wore a suede jacket, an uncommon garment at the time. During this time his wife Giorgina Toffanin, was arrested, and deported to Auschwitz; she returned at the end of 1945.

== The massacre of Porzûs ==
On 2 February 1945 Toffanin left Trieste and went to Udine, with the task to recruit a new GAP. On 7 February 1945 he received orders from the local cell of Italian Communist Party of Udine (PCI) and the 9th Corps of Yugoslav Liberation Army, to head a group of communist partisans (some sources says up to 100), to the HQ of the Brigade of the Partisan Division Osoppo, a non-communist unit, located near the “malghe” of Porzûs, in the municipality of Faedis in eastern Friuli. Their mission was to seize the Osoppo HQ and arrest the Osoppo partisans. The group was directed by Toffanin and by Fortunato Pagnutti, name de guerre "Dinamite" (dynamite), climbed the mount Toplj-Uork, and approached the Osoppo partisan disguised as disbanded soldiers. The ruse was successful and the Osoppo partisans were disarmed and apprehended.

During the subsequent reconstruction of the events, it appears that Toffanin personally interviewed Osoppo partisan Leader “BOLLA”, Francesco De Gregori (the paternal uncle of the famous Italian singer Francesco De Gregori, and a former Captain of the Alpini Corps of the Royal Italian Army) to know the whereabouts of the Brigade weapon cache, that was subsequently seized. Thereafter the prisoners and the equipment were marched down into the valley, while De Gregori, the brigade political commissar Gastone Valente nom de guerre "Enea", the twenty-year old Giovanni Comin "Gruaro" and a woman Elda Turchetti, believed to be a spy, were executed. Another Osoppo Partisan leader, Aldo Bricco "Centina", although wounded, escaped the execution. The following day the remaining Osoppo partisans were assigned to the partisan Battalions "Ardito" and "Giotto". However some of them, among whom Guido Pasolini a.k.a. "Ermes", brother of the writer Pier Paolo Pasolini, were also executed.

As the news of the massacre surfaced, the federation of the PCI of Udine at first attempted to put the blame on the Germans and the Republican Fascists, but few days later the Toffanin group was disbanded. From then onward the episode will be remembered as the “Porzûs massacre”. Mario Lizzero, political commissar of the brigades Garibaldi - Friuli, as soon as he heard of the massacre proposed the death penalty for Toffanin and his men. In his autobiography published posthumously in 1995 Mario Lizzero a.k.a. Andrea (Mortegliano, 28 June 1913 – Udine, 11 December 1994) stated: "A hundred Garibaldini members, without uniforms (...) convince themselves, without having real evidence, that twenty or so Osovari partisans were somewhat connected with the enemy… as soon as they arrived, the commander "Bolla", the Political Commissioner "Enea", a woman, and a fourth man, were arrested, and subsequently executed. During the following days other Osoppo partisans were executed without a trial. In total, without any trial: 19 Osoppo partisan murdered! (...) That was not partisan justice, but a real massacre (...). I believe that the massacre of Porzus is at the origin of the great loss of prestige and strength of the Garibaldi resistance and also of the PCI. Unfortunately, on that GAP unit led by "Giacca" the Division Garibaldi "Friuli" of which I was political commissioner has never had any real influence, being that unit (which after Porzus was disbanded ), under the firm orders of the Friulian Communist Federation.»

The information that the “Garibaldini” received from an undisclosed source, were pure allegations. Instead, evidences were given that, indeed the Osovans were received the proposal of a meeting by enemy, were they Republican Fascists or Germans is not known, but those proposals, were never taken into consideration and turned down without any contact. In the end it appears that the Porzus massacre was just a deliberate act probably part of a larger strategy, to eliminate possible future enemies who might have opposed the eventual inclusion of part of the eastern Italian provinces to the new Communist Yugoslavia, which had been envisioned during the Jaice Congress of 1943 aimed to extend the communist dominance. Like many Italian Communists, Toffanin was an Internationalists, who really believed in a communist utopic world with no borders. The Yugoslav were internationalist in words, but the reality was different; their main goal was to extend Yugoslavia, as they clearly showed in the years after the war, and that become more evident when Tito's Yugoslavia severed ties with Moscow in 1948.

After the war, a large part of the leadership and communist base of Venezia Giulia began a campaign for the constitution of a 7th Federative Republic corresponding to the territory of Venezia Giulia itself, thus starting the controversial post-war international negotiations, claiming the annexation of Trieste, Monfalcone and part of the Isontino to Yugoslavia. When the dream of the union with Yugoslavia faded away, Toffanin, like approximately 2,500 Italian workers of Friuli-Venezia Giulia, emigrated to Yugoslavia between 1946 and 1948 to offer their professional skills mostly at the Fiume/Rijeka and the Pola shipyard, handed over by Italy to Yugoslavia following the Treaty of Paris of 10 February 1947. Historians refer to them as the “Monfalconesi”.

Although Toffanin emigrated to Yugoslavia to escape justice, it is possible that he also wanted to put his peacetime dockyard expertise at the service of Yugoslavia. Another notorious example of this emigration is the Italian born writer Giacomo Scotti; born in Saviano (Naples Province) on 1 December 1928, a fervent communist who left Italy in 1947, and that still lives in Croatia where is a member of the Croatian Writers' Association. When in 1948, Tito severed the ties with Stalin, things rapidly changed for the Monfalconesi. The Yugoslav leadership considered them as potential internal enemies, a sort of fifth column, since they were almost all loyal to the concept of the “Great Soviet Family”, and a process of repression started. Most of the Monfalconesi, along with the native Italians who had not moved to Italy after the end of WW2 were interned in the infamous Goli Otok, the gulag built on the homonymous island of Kvarner in which were imprisoned in inhuman conditions, and sometimes died, many internal opponents of Tito, often communists, of all nationalities present in Yugoslavia. Later, many Monfalconesi were expelled to Italy where their return was keep secret by the Italian Communist Party, or to countries of the Soviet bloc, Czechoslovakia in particular, like Toffanin who could not return to Italy where he was sentenced to life in prison; others, very few, decided to remain in Yugoslavia.

== After WW2 ==
On 1 May 1945 the Yugoslav Communist Army occupied the Julian March, which was annexed to Yugoslavia. During the forty-day Yugoslavian occupation of Trieste, in 1945, Toffanin was appointed political commissar. The Yugoslav Army left the city as well as many other small villages of the Istrian peninsula on 12 June 1945. On 23 June 1945 Mario Toffanin was officially indicted by Public Prosecutor office of Udine for the massacre of Porzus of the Osoppo Division Command. In 1946 when Trieste, was still under the Allied Military Government rule, he fled to Yugoslavia, where he received the "Partizanska Spomenica 1941", a Yugoslav medal of honor for veterans of the partisan war.

When Yugoslavia was expelled from Cominform, Mario Toffanin, and some other International communist moved to Czechoslovakia. In October 1951 the trial of the facts of Porzûs began at the Court of Assizes of Lucca. In 1952 he was sentenced in absentia to life imprisonment. In 1978, during the Sandro Pertini presidency he was granted pardon, an act that was criticized by many. This act of clemency also enabled him to receive a pension by the Italian Government. With the dissolution of Yugoslavia in 1991 he returned to Slovenia, and settled down first in Capodistra-Koper and then in Albaro Vescovà/ Skofie, a small village half a mile away from the Italian border.

When in 1996 he was interviewed by the Roberto Morelli of the Corriere della Sera, he showed no sign of regret for his actions during the war, confirming his communist faith and repeating the accusations to the Osoppo partisans of collaboration with the enemy. When his pension check issue was raised, he replied that he had earned it, by having worked 13 years at the Trieste dockyards and by having fought 4 years of war, and that the years of work at the dockyards plus the war benefits granted him that right, in accordance with the Italian laws. During his second exile in Slovenia, he often went to Trieste unmolested, to visit his son. He died in Sesana at the age of 86 on 22 January 1999.
