= Remanzacco =

Remanzacco Remanzâs (Friulian)
- Comune
- Comune di Remanzacco
- Location within Italy Location within Friuli-Venezia Giulia
- Coordinates: 46°5′N 13°19′E
- Country: Italy
- Region: Friuli-Venezia Giulia
- Province: Udine (UD)
- Frazioni: Ziracco, Selvis, Orzano, Cerneglons

Area
  - Total: 30.6 km^{2} (11.8 sq mi)

Population (Dec. 2004)
  - Total: 5,774
  - Density: 189/km^{2} (489/sq mi)
- Demonym: Remanzacchesi
- Time zone: UTC+1 (CET)
  - Summer (DST): UTC+2 (CEST)
- Postal code: 33047
- Dialing code: 0432
- Website: Official website

Remanzacco (Friulian: Remanzâs) is a comune (municipality) in the Regional decentralization entity of Udine in the Italian region of Friuli-Venezia Giulia, located about 60 kilometres (37 mi) northwest of Trieste and about 7 kilometres (4 mi) northeast of Udine. As of 31 December 2004, it had a population of 5,774 and an area of 30.6 square kilometres (11.8 mi^{2}).

The municipality of Remanzacco contains the frazioni (boroughs) Ziracco, Selvis, Orzano, and Cerneglons.

Remanzacco borders the following municipalities: Faedis, Moimacco, Povoletto, Pradamano, Premariacco, Udine.

== Demographic evolution ==
Historical population

Year	Pop.	±%
1861	?	—
1871	2,850	—
1881	2,861	+0.4%
1901	3,218	+12.5%
1911	3,529	+9.7%

Year	Pop.	±%
1921	3,840	+8.8%
1931	3,604	−6.1%
1936	3,536	−1.9%
1951	3,749	+6.0%
1961	3,771	+0.6%

Year	Pop.	±%
1971	3,925	+4.1%
1981	4,703	+19.8%
1991	5,051	+7.4%
2001	5,547	+9.8%

Source: Data from ISTAT
