= Taipana =

Taipana Tajpana (Slovene) Taipane (Friulian)
- Comune
- Comune di Taipana
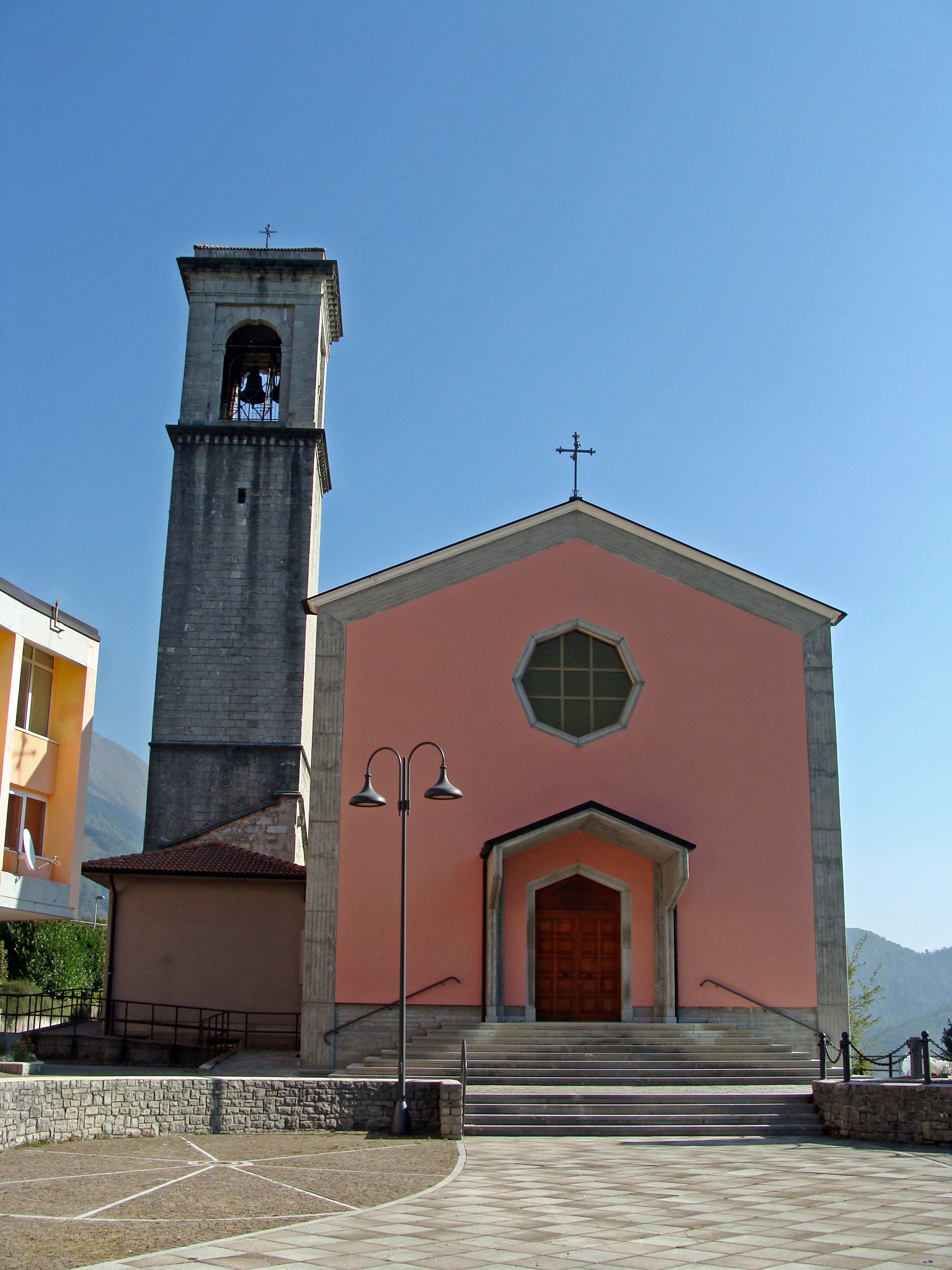
- Parish Church

- Location within Italy Location within Friuli-Venezia Giulia
- Coordinates: 46°15′N 13°20′E
- Country: Italy
- Region: Friuli-Venezia Giulia
- Province: Udine (UD)

Area
  - Total: 65.6 km^{2} (25.3 sq mi)
- Elevation: 478 m (1,568 ft)

Population (Dec. 2004)
  - Total: 737
  - Density: 11.2/km^{2} (29.1/sq mi)
- Time zone: UTC+1 (CET)
  - Summer (DST): UTC+2 (CEST)
- Postal code: 33040
- Dialing code: 0432

Taipana (Slovene: Tajpana; Friulian: Taipane) is a comune (municipality) in the Regional decentralization entity of Udine in the Italian region of Friuli-Venezia Giulia, located about 80 kilometres (50 mi) northwest of Trieste and about 20 kilometres (12 mi) northeast of Udine, on the border with Slovenia. As of 31 December 2004, it had a population of 737 and an area of 65.6 square kilometres (25.3 mi^{2}). According to the census 1971 92,9% of the population are Slovenes.

Taipana borders the following municipalities: Attimis, Kobarid (Slovenia), Faedis, Lusevera, Nimis.

== Demographic evolution ==
Historical population

Year	Pop.	±%
1861	?	—
1871	2,638	—
1881	2,800	+6.1%
1901	3,255	+16.3%
1911	3,700	+13.7%

Year	Pop.	±%
1921	3,597	−2.8%
1931	3,401	−5.4%
1936	3,023	−11.1%
1951	2,841	−6.0%
1961	2,258	−20.5%

Year	Pop.	±%
1971	1,251	−44.6%
1981	936	−25.2%
1991	777	−17.0%
2001	715	−8.0%

Source: Data from ISTAT

== See also ==
- Venetian Slovenia
- Slovene Lands
- Friuli
