= Nimis =

Nimis Neme (Slovene)
- Comune
- Comune di Nimis
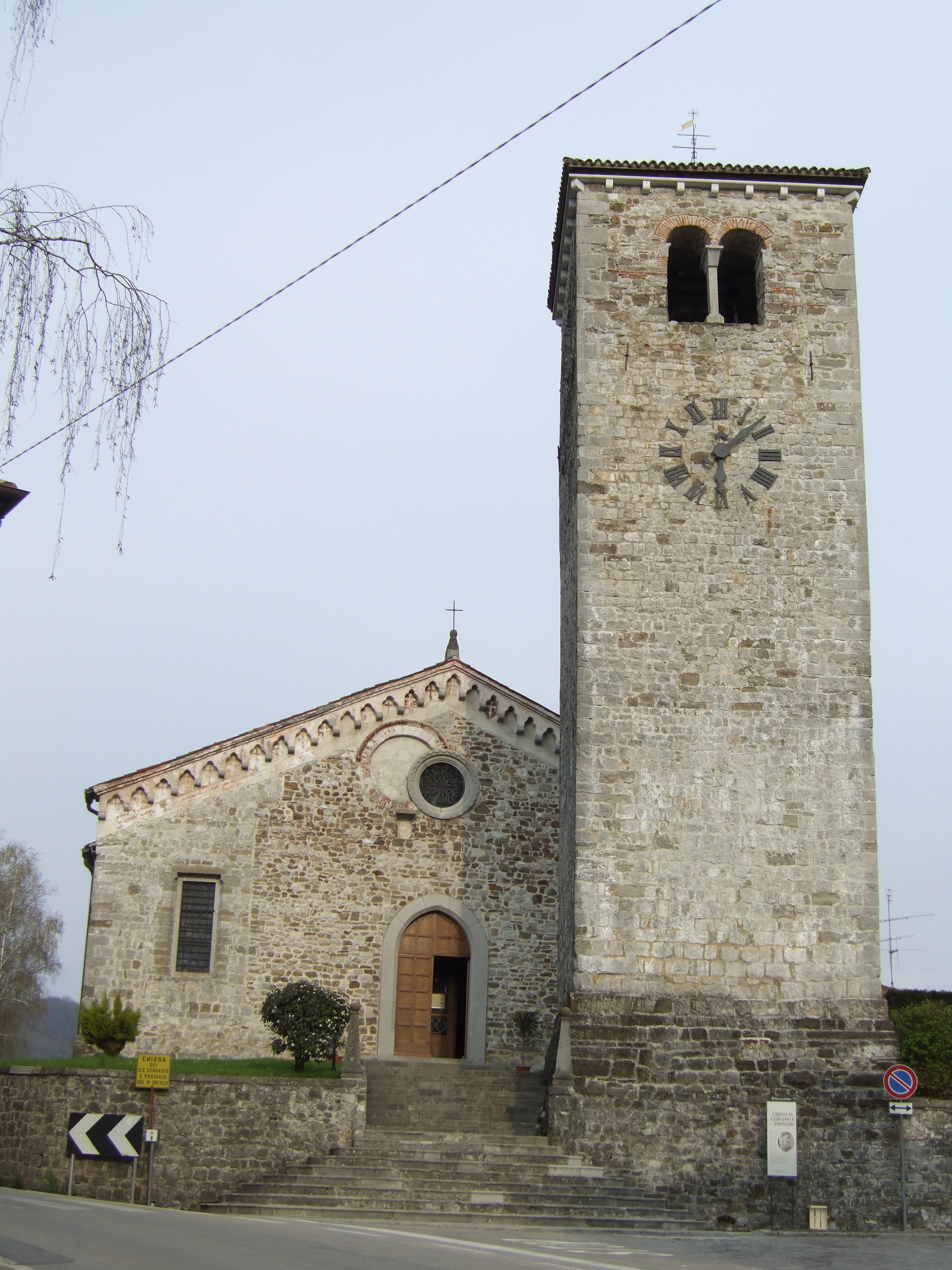
- Church of Sts. Gervasius and Protasius

- Coat of arms

- Location within Italy Location within Friuli-Venezia Giulia
- Coordinates: 46°12′01″N 13°15′54″E
- Country: Italy
- Region: Friuli-Venezia Giulia
- Province: Udine (UD)
- Frazioni: Cergneu, Chialminis, Monteprato, Nongruella, Pecolle, Ramandolo, Tamar, Torlano, Vallemontana

Government
  - Mayor: Gloria Bressani

Area
  - Total: 33.9 km^{2} (13.1 sq mi)
- Elevation: 207 m (679 ft)

Population (30 November 2017)
  - Total: 2,710
  - Density: 79.9/km^{2} (207/sq mi)
- Demonym: Nimesi or Nimensi
- Time zone: UTC+1 (CET)
  - Summer (DST): UTC+2 (CEST)
- Postal code: 33045
- Dialing code: 0432
- Patron saint: Sts. Gervasius and Protasius
- Saint day: 8 September
- Website: Official website

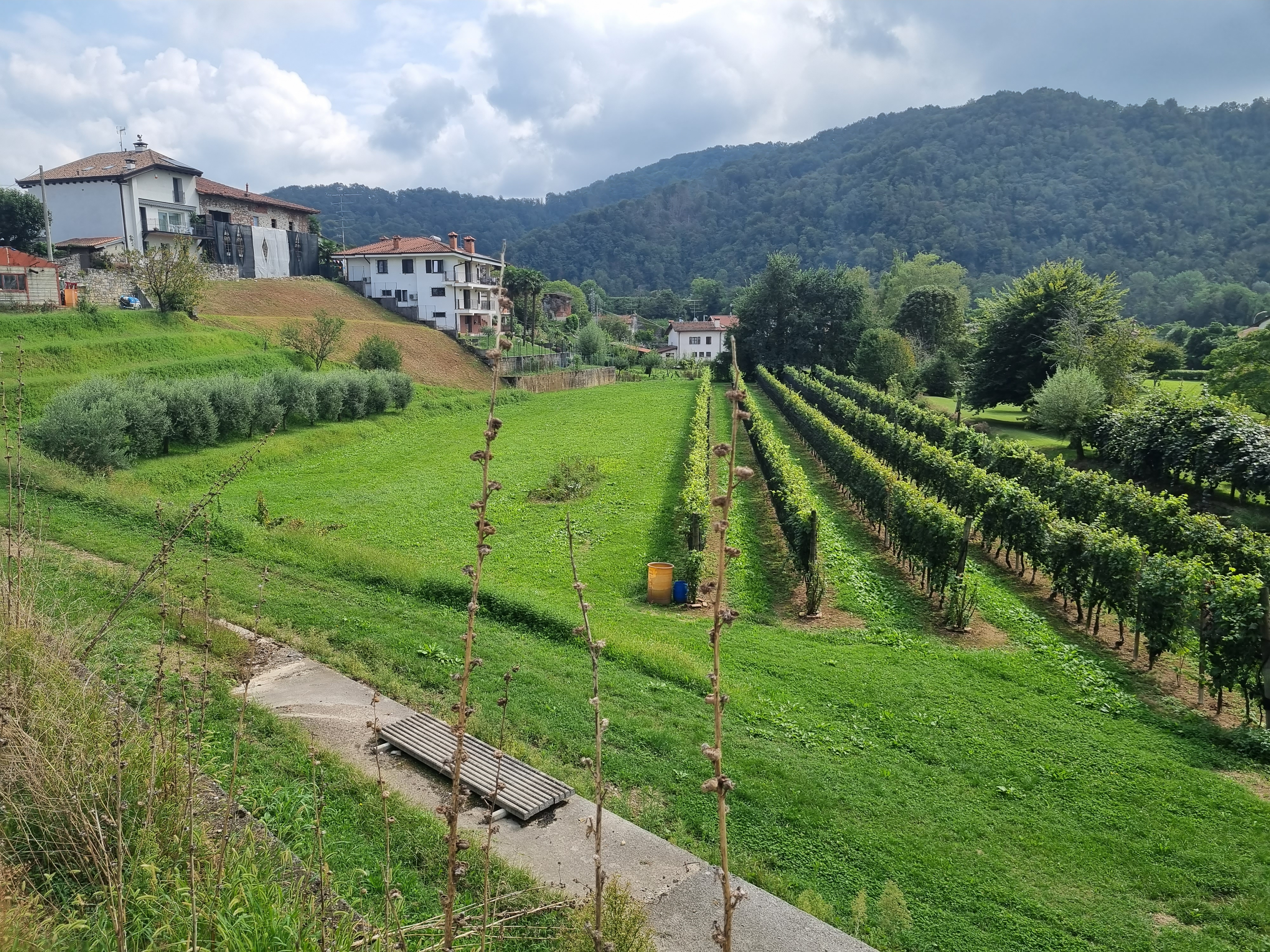
Vineyard in Nimis

Nimis (Slovene: Neme) is a town and comune (municipality) in the Regional decentralization entity of Udine, Friuli, in the north-eastern Italian region of Friuli-Venezia Giulia, near the border with Slovenia. It is located at the foot of Mount Bernadia, home to a World War I Italian fort and to a sweet white wine called Ramandolo.

The town is bordered by the municipalities of Attimis, Lusevera, Povoletto, Reana del Rojale, Taipana, and Tarcento.

According to the 1971 census, 25.4% of the population are Slovenes, but these are located mainly in some villages on the surrounding hills and not in the main town and the rest of the plain. Due to the ethnic, linguistic, and cultural features of their population, the mountainous parts of the municipality are considered part of the traditional region known as the Friulian Slavia. In the remaining part of the municipality, Friulian is still widely spoken.

== History ==
Nimis was founded by the ancient Romans, its name deriving from the Latin word Nemus. After the fall of the Western Roman Empire it housed a castrum, mentioned by Paul the Deacon in his Historia Langobardorum. During World War II, the town was burned by the SS, due to the presence of both Italian and Yugoslav partisan brigades in the area.
