= Povoletto =

Povoletto Paulêt (Friulian)
- Comune
- Comune di Povoletto
- Location within Italy Location within Friuli-Venezia Giulia
- Coordinates: 46°7′N 13°17′E
- Country: Italy
- Region: Friuli-Venezia Giulia
- Province: Udine (UD)
- Frazioni: Salt, Grions del Torre, Bellazoia, Belvedere, Marsure di Sotto, Marsure di Sopra, Magredis, Savorgnano del Torre, Ravosa, Siacco, Primulacco

Government
  - Mayor: Giuliano Castenetto

Area
  - Total: 39.0 km^{2} (15.1 sq mi)
- Elevation: 116 m (381 ft)

Population (Dec. 2004)
  - Total: 5,500
  - Density: 140/km^{2} (370/sq mi)
- Demonym: Povolettani oppure povolesi
- Time zone: UTC+1 (CET)
  - Summer (DST): UTC+2 (CEST)
- Postal code: 33040
- Dialing code: 0432
- Website: Official website

Povoletto (Friulian: Paulêt) is a comune (municipality) in the Regional decentralization entity of Udine in the Italian region of Friuli-Venezia Giulia, located about 70 kilometres (43 mi) northwest of Trieste and about 7 kilometres (4 mi) northeast of Udine. As of 31 December 2004, it had a population of 5,500 and an area of 39.0 square kilometres (15.1 mi^{2}).

The municipality of Povoletto contains the frazioni (boroughs) Salt, Grions del Torre, Bellazoia, Belvedere, Marsure di Sotto, Marsure di Sopra, Magredis, Savorgnano del Torre, Ravosa, Siacco, and Primulacco.

Povoletto borders the following municipalities: Attimis, Faedis, Nimis, Reana del Rojale, Remanzacco, Udine.

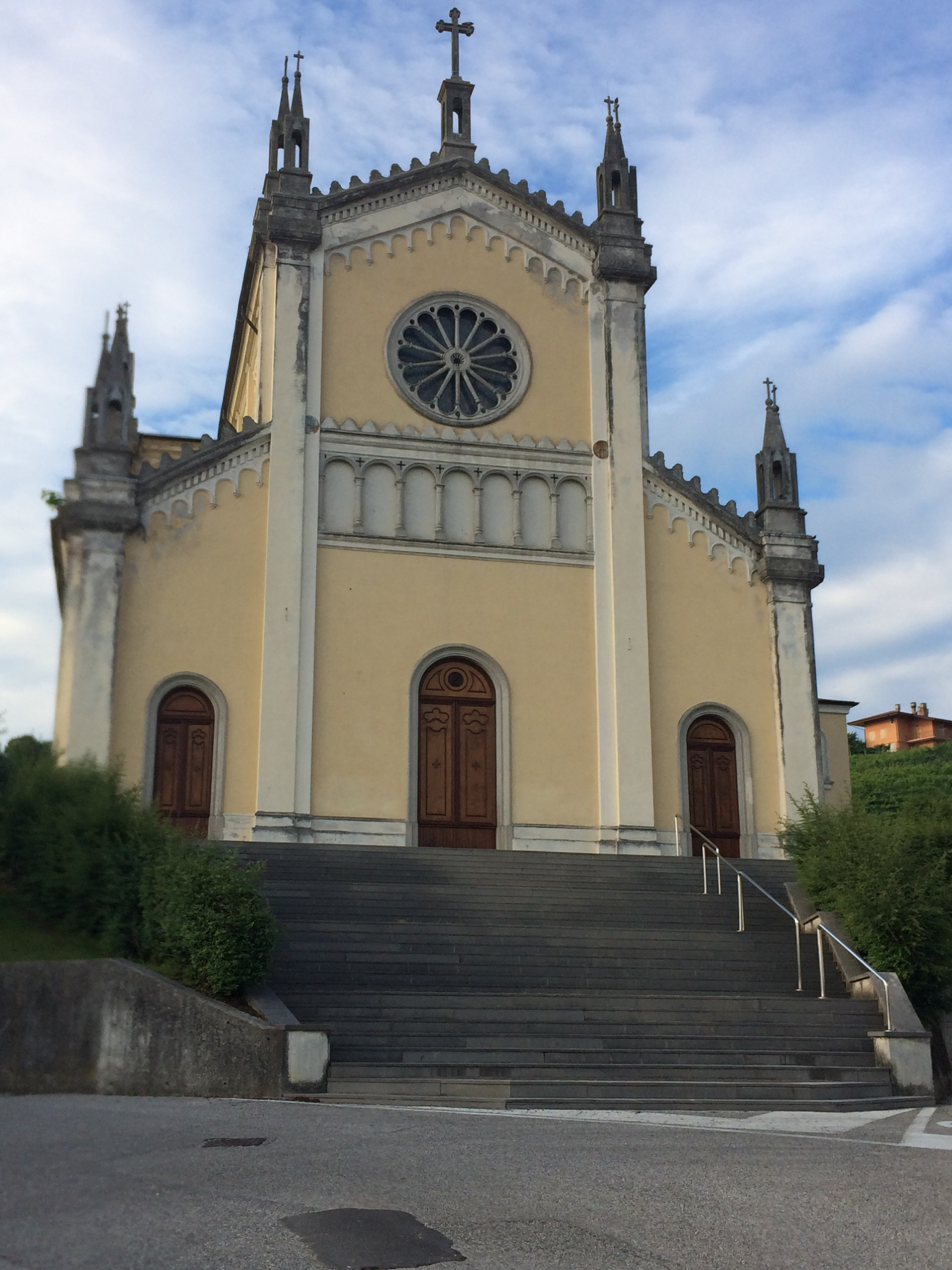
San Michele church

== Demographic evolution ==
Historical population

| Year | Pop. | ±% |
|---|---|---|
| 1861 | ? | — |
| 1871 | 3,336 | — |
| 1881 | 3,505 | +5.1% |
| 1901 | 4,005 | +14.3% |
| 1911 | 4,498 | +12.3% |

| Year | Pop. | ±% |
|---|---|---|
| 1921 | 4,606 | +2.4% |
| 1931 | 4,726 | +2.6% |
| 1936 | 4,364 | −7.7% |
| 1951 | 4,834 | +10.8% |
| 1961 | 4,572 | −5.4% |

| Year | Pop. | ±% |
|---|---|---|
| 1971 | 4,153 | −9.2% |
| 1981 | 4,878 | +17.5% |
| 1991 | 5,241 | +7.4% |
| 2001 | 5,276 | +0.7% |

Source: Data from ISTAT
