= Attimis =

Attimis Atimis (Friulian) Ahten (Slovene)
- Comune
- Comune di Attimis
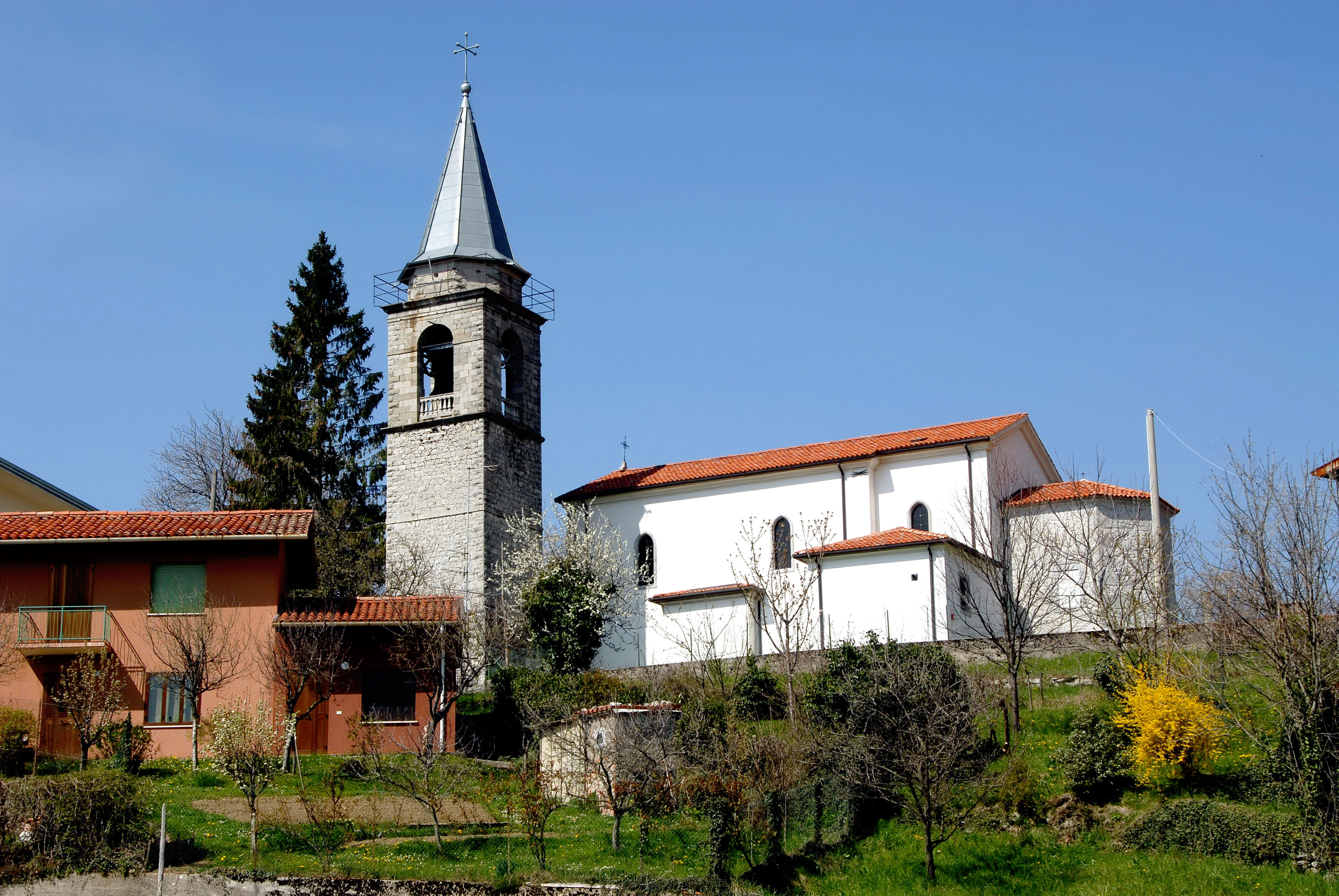
- Church of St. John the Baptist and Lucia of Porzûs

- Location of Attimis in Italy Attimis (Friuli-Venezia Giulia)
- Coordinates: 46°11′N 13°18′E
- Country: Italy
- Region: Friuli-Venezia Giulia
- Province: Udine (UD)
- Frazioni: Forame, Subit, Porzus, Racchiuso

Government
  - Mayor: Maurizio Malduca

Area
  - Total: 33.24 km^{2} (12.83 sq mi)
- Elevation: 133 m (436 ft)

Population (30 April 2017)
  - Total: 1,743
  - Density: 52.44/km^{2} (135.8/sq mi)
- Demonym: Attimesi
- Time zone: UTC+1 (CET)
  - Summer (DST): UTC+2 (CEST)
- Postal code: 33040
- Dialing code: 0432
- Patron saint: sant'Andrea
- Saint day: 30 November
- Website: Official website

Attimis (Friulian: Atimis; German: Attems; Slovene: Ahten) is a comune (municipality) in the Regional decentralization entity of Udine in the Italian region of Friuli-Venezia Giulia, located about 70 kilometres (43 mi) northwest of Trieste and about 14 kilometres (9 mi) northeast of Udine.

Attimis borders the following municipalities: Faedis, Nimis, Povoletto, Taipana.

== Main sights ==
Attimis is home to a medieval archaeological museum.

== People ==
The Attems noble family originates from the Fortress of Attimis.

Puerto Rican songwriter and musician Tony Croatto was born in Attimis.
