= Lusevera =

Lusevera Bardo (Slovene) Lusevare (Friulian)
- Comune
- Comune di Lusevera
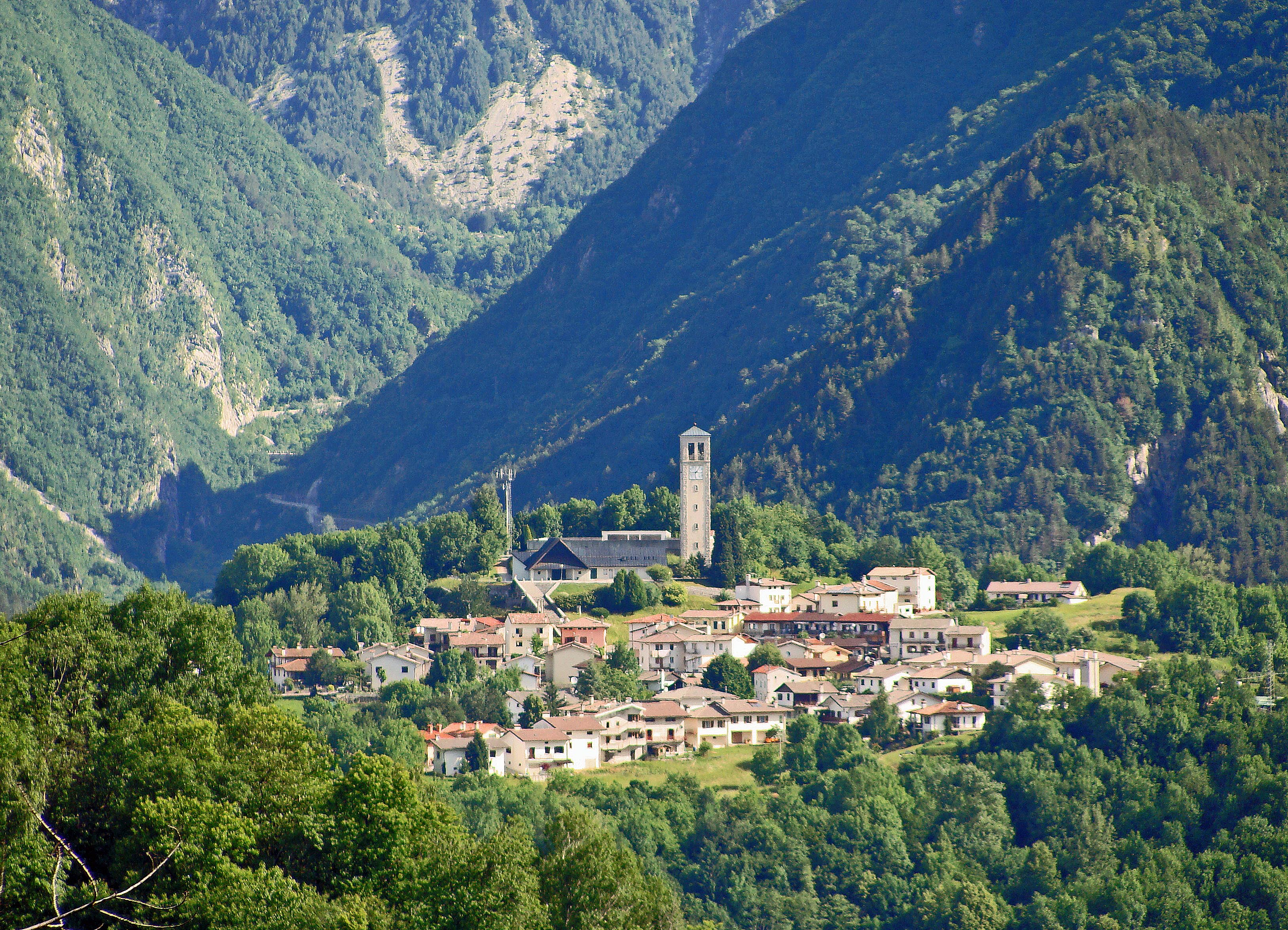

- Location within Italy Location within Friuli-Venezia Giulia
- Coordinates: 46°16′N 13°16′E
- Country: Italy
- Region: Friuli-Venezia Giulia
- Province: Udine (UD)
- Frazioni: Cesariis/Podbardo, Micottis/Sedlišča, Musi, Pers/Breg, Pradielis/Ter, Vedronza/Njivica, Villanova/Zavarh

Government
  - Mayor: Guido Marchiol

Area
  - Total: 53.05 km^{2} (20.48 sq mi)
- Elevation: 325 m (1,066 ft)

Population (30 April 2017)
  - Total: 648
  - Density: 12.2/km^{2} (31.6/sq mi)
- Demonym: Luseveresi
- Time zone: UTC+1 (CET)
  - Summer (DST): UTC+2 (CEST)
- Postal code: 33010
- Dialing code: 0432
- Website: Official website

Lusevera (Slovene: Bardo; Friulian: Lusevare) is a comune (municipality) in the Regional decentralization entity of Udine in the Italian region of Friuli-Venezia Giulia, located about 80 kilometres (50 mi) northwest of Trieste and about 20 kilometres (12 mi) north of Udine, on the border with Slovenia, and borders the following municipalities: Gemona del Friuli, Kobarid (Slovenia), Montenars, Nimis, Resia, Taipana, Tarcento, and Venzone.

== Ethnic composition ==
86,4% of the population were Slovenes according to the 1971 census.

== See also ==
- Venetian Slovenia
- Slovene Lands
