= Karl Michael von Attems =

Most Reverend Karl Michael von Attems
- Archbishop
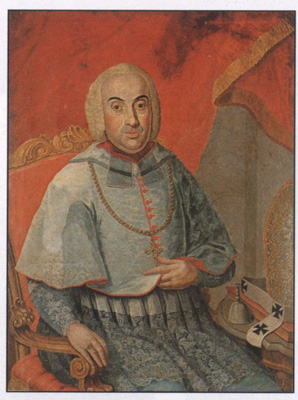
- Church: Catholic Church
- Diocese: Roman Catholic Archdiocese of Gorizia
- In office: 1752-1774
- Successor: Rudolf Josef von Edling
- Previous post: Titular Bishop of Pergamum (1750-1752)

Orders
- Ordination: 6 January 1737 by Joaquín Fernández de Portocarrero y Mendoza
- Consecration: 24 August 1750 by Ernest Amadeus von Attems

Personal details
- Born: 1 July 1711 Gorizia (Istria, Austria)
- Died: 18 February 1774 (aged 62) Gorizia, Italy

Karl Michael von Attems (Gorizia, 1 July 1711 – Gorizia, 18 February 1774) was an Austrian Catholic archbishop and a prince of the Holy Roman Empire.

== Biography ==
Karl Michael was born in Gorizia on 1 July 1711. He was the fifth child of Count Giovanni Francesco von Attems, whose family had been named hereditary counts by the Emperor Frederick II in the 13th century. His mother was Countess Elisabeth Coronini-Cronberg, whose family had migrated to Gorizia from Bergamo in the 16th century. Her family received the title of count from the Emperor Leopold I in 1687.

At the age of 10, after the death of his father, Karl Michael was sent to the Jesuit school in Graz, where he spent two years; then, in the footsteps of his eldest brother Sigismondo, he and his brother Ludovico were placed in the Collegio dei Nobili in Modena. He received an expansive cultural and scholarly education. It was during his residence in Modena that the Rector of the college, Bartolomeo Sassari, directed his attention to the ecclesiastical profession.

In 1732, at the age of 21, he moved to Rome, where he completed his theological training at the Sapienza, and where he undertook the study of law. He obtained the doctorate in Canon Law on 20 July 1735.

=== Benefices ===
At the end of 1735, Attems obtained from Pope Clement XII the Provostship of the collegiate church of Bettenbrunn (Switzerland), in the territory of the Prince Furstenberg. On 19 January 1736, the pope added to Attems' benefices the Provostship of the cathedral of Worms and a canonry, but the cathedral Chapter objected on the grounds that the appointment belonged to them, not to the pope. Attems immediately renounced the honors.

Von Attems was ordained a priest in Rome on 6 January 1737, by Joaquín Fernández de Portocarrero y Mendoza, Patriarch of Antioch. When Jacobus Sigismundus von Rainach was appointed Bishop of Basel (Switzerland) on 30 September 1737, he vacated the provostship, a canonicate, and a prebend in the cathedral Chapter. Attems was named to the vacant canonicate in the cathedral Chapter of Basel by Pope Clement.

On 20 December 1737, Archbishop Josephus von Lamberg of Passau was named a cardinal, at the request of the Emperor Charles VI, and on 7 January 1738, Karl Michael von Attems was named a papal chamberlain of honor, and sent to Vienna with the red beretta of the cardinalate. It was during this mission that he first met Maria Theresa of Austria, who became one of his patrons.

The Bishop of Trieste, Luca Sertorio Delmestri, died on 6 November 1739. Canon von Attems hoped to be appointed his successor, with the support of Cardinal von Lamberg, but, on 27 August 1740, the Emperor Charles VI nominated Leopold von Petaz instead, and he was approved by Pope Benedict XIV on 30 September 1740. Cardinal von Lamberg had written to Altems' mother on 24 December 1739, informing her that the effort had not been successful.

=== Reorganization of ecclesiastical provinces ===
The death of the Emperor Charles VI produced a crisis in Germany, which led to the War of the Austrian Succession (1740–1748). Both Venice and the Papacy supported Charles Albert of Bavaria, while Austria supported Maria Theresa, daughter of Charles VI, Holy Roman Emperor. The Austrian government retaliated by sequestering all church benefices in its territories. At the conclusion of the war, both Austria and Venice demanded a resolution of the ecclesiastical problems, which centered around the Patriarchate of Aquileia, the eastern dioceses of which were in the civil province of Istria, and were politically subject to Austria; while the western dioceses were in the Veneto, and were politically subject to the Venetian Republic. In protracted negotiations, one suggestion was that the two powers should alternately nominate the Patriarch of Aquileia, but Pope Benedict XIV was not friendly to the idea.

On 29 November 1749, Pope Benedict announced in a papal consistory that he intended to nominate a Vicar Apostolic for the territories of the Patriarchate of Aquileia which lay in the control of the Empire. On the same day, he sent an apostolic letter to Venice and to Vienna, informing them of his intention, and hoping that it would permanently end the dissensions.

On 27 June 1750, Attems was named Vicar Apostolic, and on 20 July he was nominated Bishop of Pergamum (Turkey). He took possession of the diocese entrusted to him on 2 August 1750. He was consecrated a bishop in Ljubljana on 24 August 1750, by Bishop Ernest Amadeus von Attems, assisted by Bishop Leopoldo Petazzi of Trieste and Bishop Bonifacio Ceccotti of Pedena. He began the apostolic visitations of what was not yet canonically the diocese of Gorizia in October 1750 with the city churches of Gorizia and the immediate neighborhood. Between May and October 1751, he visited Styria, Carinthia, and Carniola. On 15 October 1751, he submitted an extensive report on the diocese to the pope.

=== Archbishop of Gorizia ===
He was appointed the first archbishop of the new Roman Catholic Archdiocese of Gorizia on 24 April 1752.

In 1753, he instituted the Mount of Piety to counter usury. In 1754, he opened the first printing establishment in Gorizia, sponsoring the Venetian Giuseppe Tommasini. In 1756, with the support of Count Giovanni Battista della Torre, he opened the "Ospedale di San Raffaele", to provide assistance to the aged infirm and to abandoned children. In 1757, with the permission of the pope and the Empress Maria Theresa, he founded a seminary, for the education (free, for a year) of priests who were undertaking assignments involving the care of souls.

In 1757, Archbishop von Attems began the process for holding a provincial synod. He applied to the Empress Maria Theresa for permission to hold the assembly, but the necessary permission was not granted until 1768. The first session of the synod therefore opened on 18 October 1768. Only the Bishop of Pedena attended in person; the other suffragans (Trieste, Como, and Trent) sent procurators, as did the suffragan bishops of Venice who had interests in the province of Gorizia (Pola, Parenzo, and Feltre). But the total attendance, including abbots, priests, and other officials, ecclesiastical and civil, was over 300.

In replying to a letter from the archbishop on 6 April 1766, asking for his prayers for her in her family problems, the Empress Maria Theresa announced that she was setting to work to procure the dignity of Prince of the Empire for him. On 2 May 1766, Attems was named a prince of the Holy Roman Empire by decree of Joseph II.

In June 1768, due to increasingly serious health problems, Archbishop Attems requested both Vienna and Rome to provide him with a coadjutor bishop. The Dean of the cathedral Chapter of Gorizia, Count Rudolf von Edling, was appointed and named titular Bishop of Capharnaum (Palaestina) on 20 November 1769; he was consecrated by Archbishop Attems on 4 September 1770.

On 16 February 1774, the archbishop suffered a stroke (colpo apoplettico), and he died on 18 February, at the age of 62. After a solemn funeral in the cathedral, he was buried in the chapel of his seminary.

== Images ==
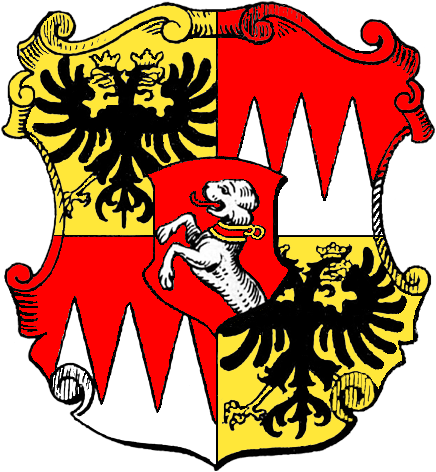
Attems family coat-of-arms

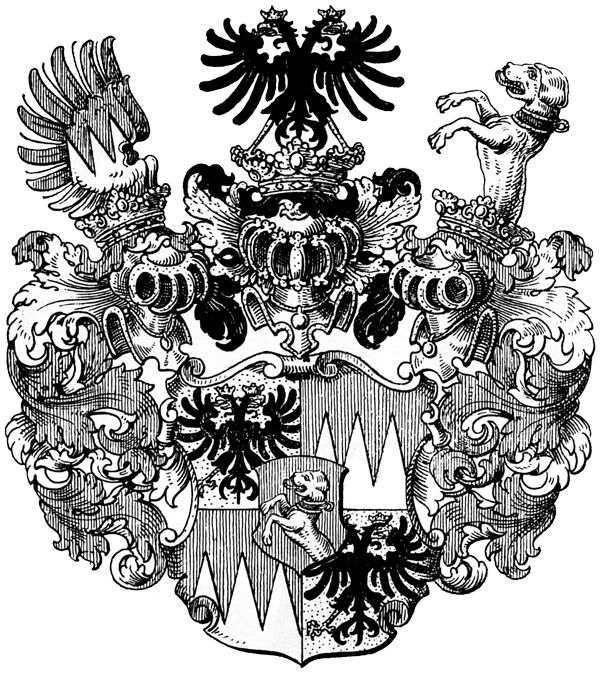
Attems family emblem

== Bibliography ==
- Cappelletti, Giuseppe (1851). Le chiese d'Italia dalla loro origine sino ai nostri giorni. (in Italian). Volume 8. Venezia: Antonelli, 1851.
- Guelmi, Girolamo (1783). Storia genealogico-cronologica degli Attems austriaci. (in Italian). Gorizia: Giacomo Tommasini, 1783; pp. 199, 204-218.
- Martina, Alessandra (1988). "Carlo Michele dei Conti d'Attems: Profilo biografico," (in Italian), in: G. De Rosa (ed.), Carlo Michele d’Attems primo arcivescovo di Gorizia (1752-1774) fra curia romana e Stato asburgico: Studi introduttivi, Istituto di Storia sociale e religiosa, Istituto per gli Incontri culturali mitteleuropei: Gorizia 1988, pp. 19-31.
- Ritzler, Remigius; Sefrin, Pirminus (1958). Hierarchia catholica medii et recentis aevi (in Latin). Vol. 6 (Tomus VI) (1730–1799). Patavii: Messagero di S. Antonio.
