= Peče =

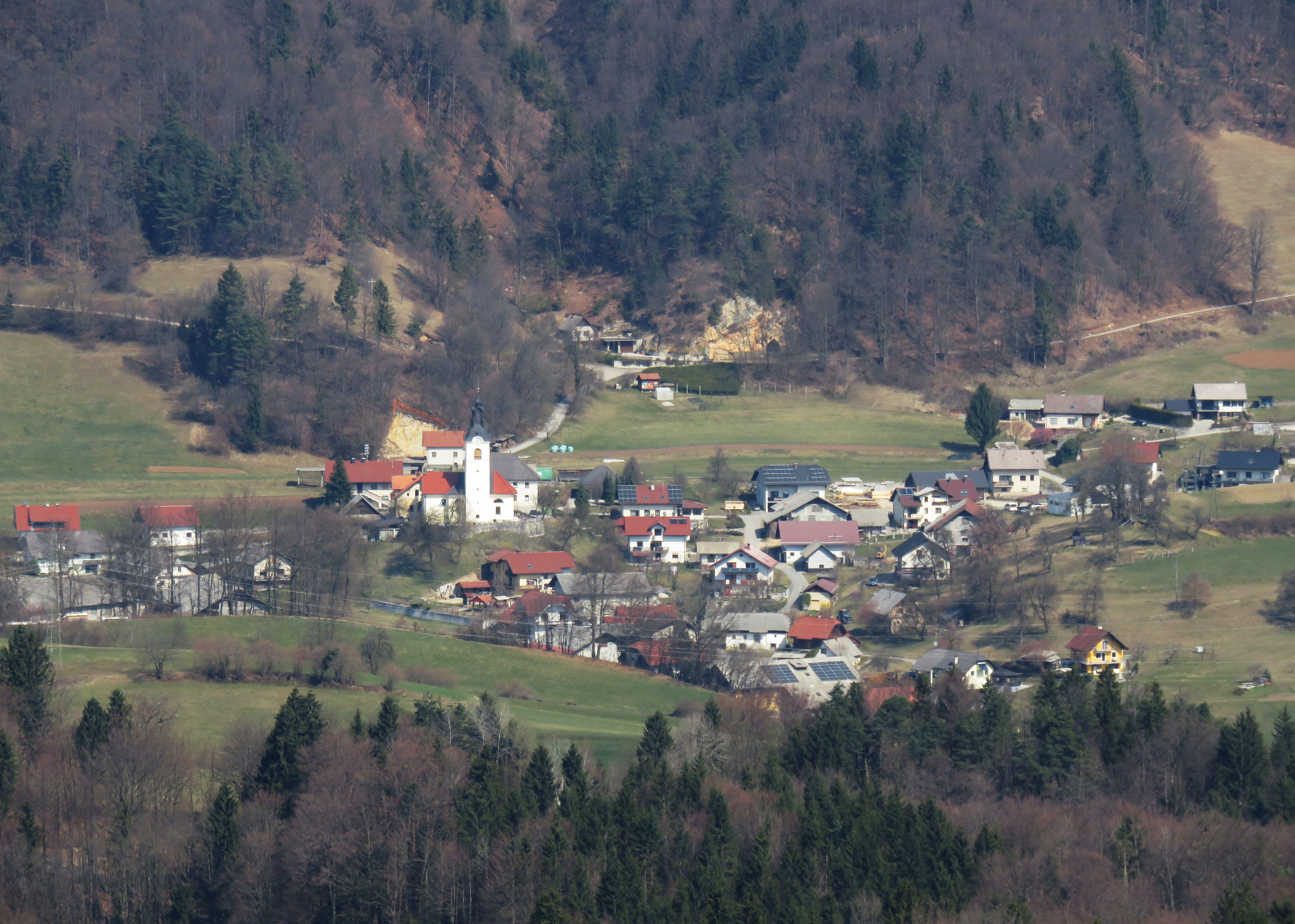

- Location in Slovenia
- Coordinates: 46°8′52.59″N 14°48′31.67″E
- Country: Slovenia
- Traditional region: Upper Carniola
- Statistical region: Central Slovenia
- Municipality: Moravče

Area
  - Total: 1.78 km^{2} (0.69 sq mi)
- Elevation: 439.2 m (1,441 ft)

Population (2002)
  - Total: 170
- Postal code: 1251

Peče (pronounced [ˈpeːtʃɛ]; German: Petsch) is a village in the Municipality of Moravče in central Slovenia. The area is part of the traditional region of Upper Carniola. It is now included with the rest of the municipality in the Central Slovenia Statistical Region.

== Name ==
Peče was attested in historical sources as Pesche and Peschs in 1238, Pecz in 1332, and Pethschach in 1497, among other spellings.

== Church ==
The parish church in the village is dedicated to Saint Bartholomew (Slovene: sveti Jernej) and belongs to the Roman Catholic Archdiocese of Ljubljana. It is a Gothic building dating to the 16th century.

== Notable people ==
Notable people that were born or lived in Peče include:

- Francis Xavier Pierz (1785–1880), missionary, parish priest in Peče from 1819 to 1829
