= Faedis =

Faedis Fojda (Slovene)
- Comune
- Comune di Faedis
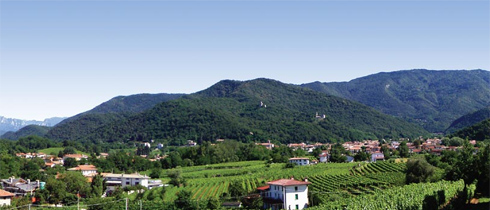

- Location within Italy Location within Friuli-Venezia Giulia
- Coordinates: 46°9′N 13°21′E
- Country: Italy
- Region: Friuli-Venezia Giulia
- Province: Udine (UD)

Government
  - Mayor: Claudio Zani

Area
  - Total: 46.78 km^{2} (18.06 sq mi)
- Elevation: 176 m (577 ft)

Population (30 April 2017) According to the 1971 census, 23,2% of the population are Slovenes.
  - Total: 2,901
  - Density: 62.01/km^{2} (160.6/sq mi)
- Demonym: Faedesi
- Time zone: UTC+1 (CET)
  - Summer (DST): UTC+2 (CEST)
- Postal code: 33040
- Dialing code: 0432
- Website: Official website

Faedis (Slovene: Fojda) is a comune (municipality) in the Regional decentralization entity of Udine in the Italian region of Friuli-Venezia Giulia, located about 70 kilometres (43 mi) northwest of Trieste and about 13 kilometres (8 mi) northeast of Udine, on the border with Slovenia.

Faedis borders the following municipalities: Attimis, Kobarid (Slovenia), Moimacco, Povoletto, Pulfero, Remanzacco, Taipana, Torreano.

== Twin towns ==
Faedis is twinned with:

- Castellterçol, Spain, since 1991
