= Pörtschach am Wörthersee =

Pörtschach am Wörther See
- Municipality
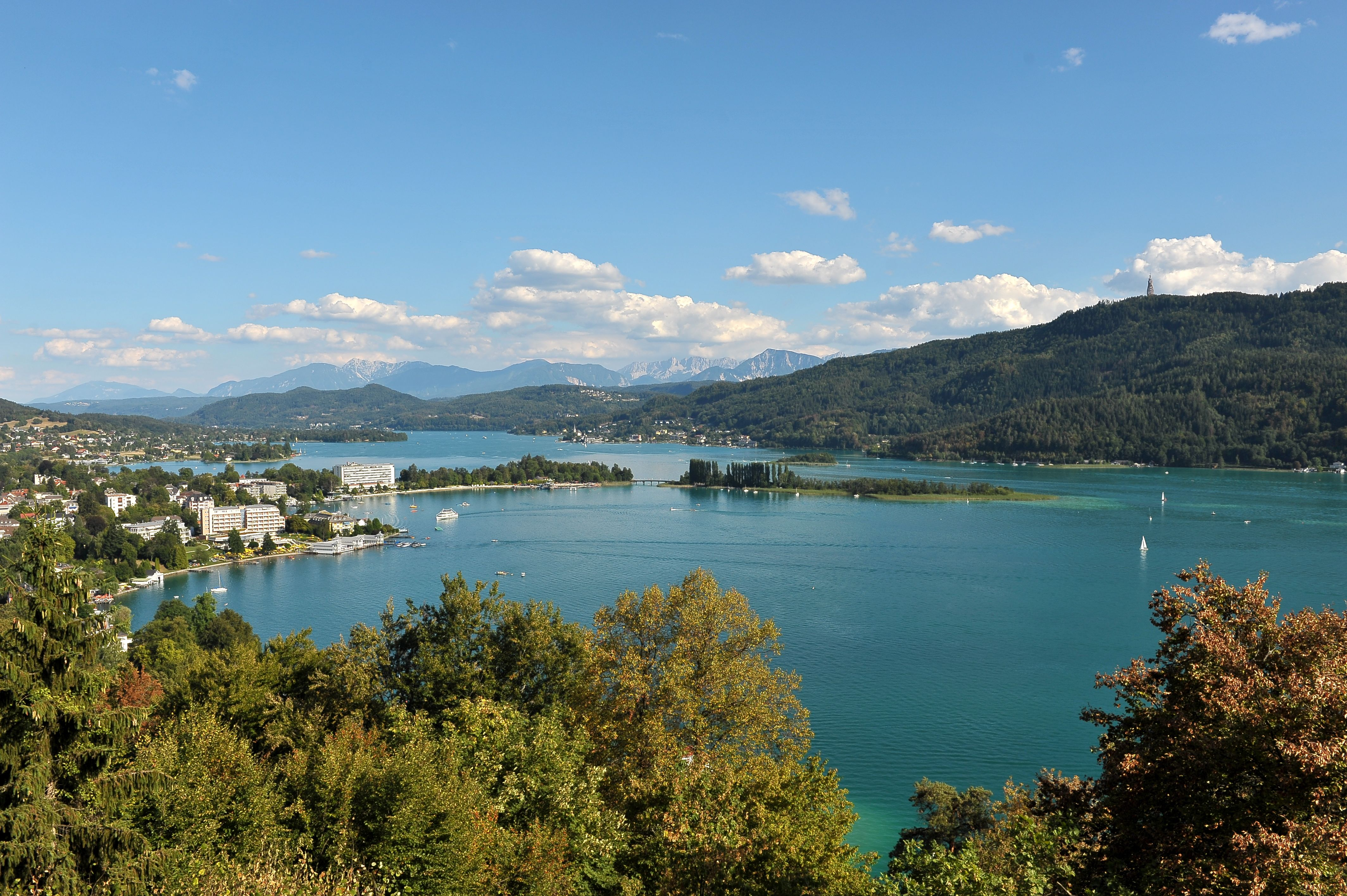

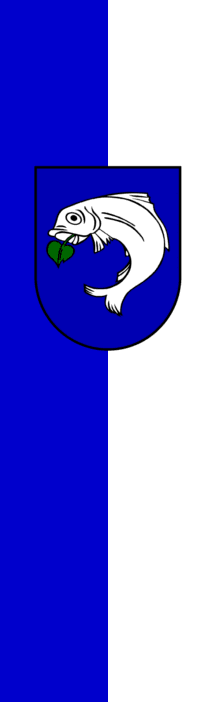
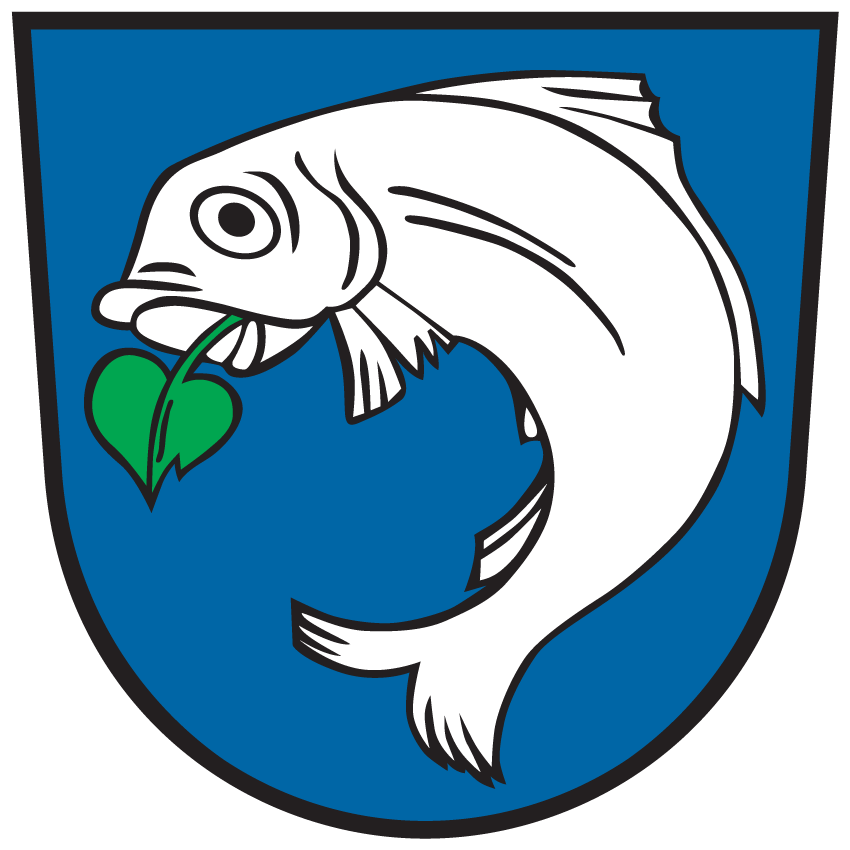
- Flag Coat of arms

- Location within Austria
- Coordinates: 46°38′N 14°9′E
- Country: Austria
- State: Carinthia
- District: Klagenfurt-Land

Government
  - Mayor: Silvia Häusl-Benz (ÖVP)

Area
  - Total: 12.62 km^{2} (4.87 sq mi)
- Elevation: 461 m (1,512 ft)

Population (2018-01-01)
  - Total: 2,751
  - Density: 218.0/km^{2} (564.6/sq mi)
- Time zone: UTC+1 (CET)
  - Summer (DST): UTC+2 (CEST)
- Postal code: 9210
- Area code: 04272
- Website: poertschach.gv.at

Pörtschach am Wörthersee (Slovene: Poreče) is a municipality in the district of Klagenfurt-Land in Carinthia, Austria. It is an established summer resort and lakeside town on Wörthersee.

== Geography ==
Pörtschach is located at 446–702 metres (1,463–2,303 ft) above mean sea level, on the northern shore of Lake Wörth, about 14 kilometres (8.7 mi) west of the Carinthian capital city, Klagenfurt am Wörthersee.

Pörtschach am Wörther See can be divided into two catastral municipalities (Katastralgemeinden): (Population as of 1 January 2025):

- Pörtschach am See (1,975)
- Sallach (1,027)

Alternatively, the municipality can also be divided into one locality (Ortschaft) (Population as of 1 January 2025):

- Pörtschach am Wörther See (3,002)

Pörtschach's neighbouring municipalities include Moosburg to the north, Techelsberg to the west, Krumpendorf to the east, and Maria Wörth to the south.

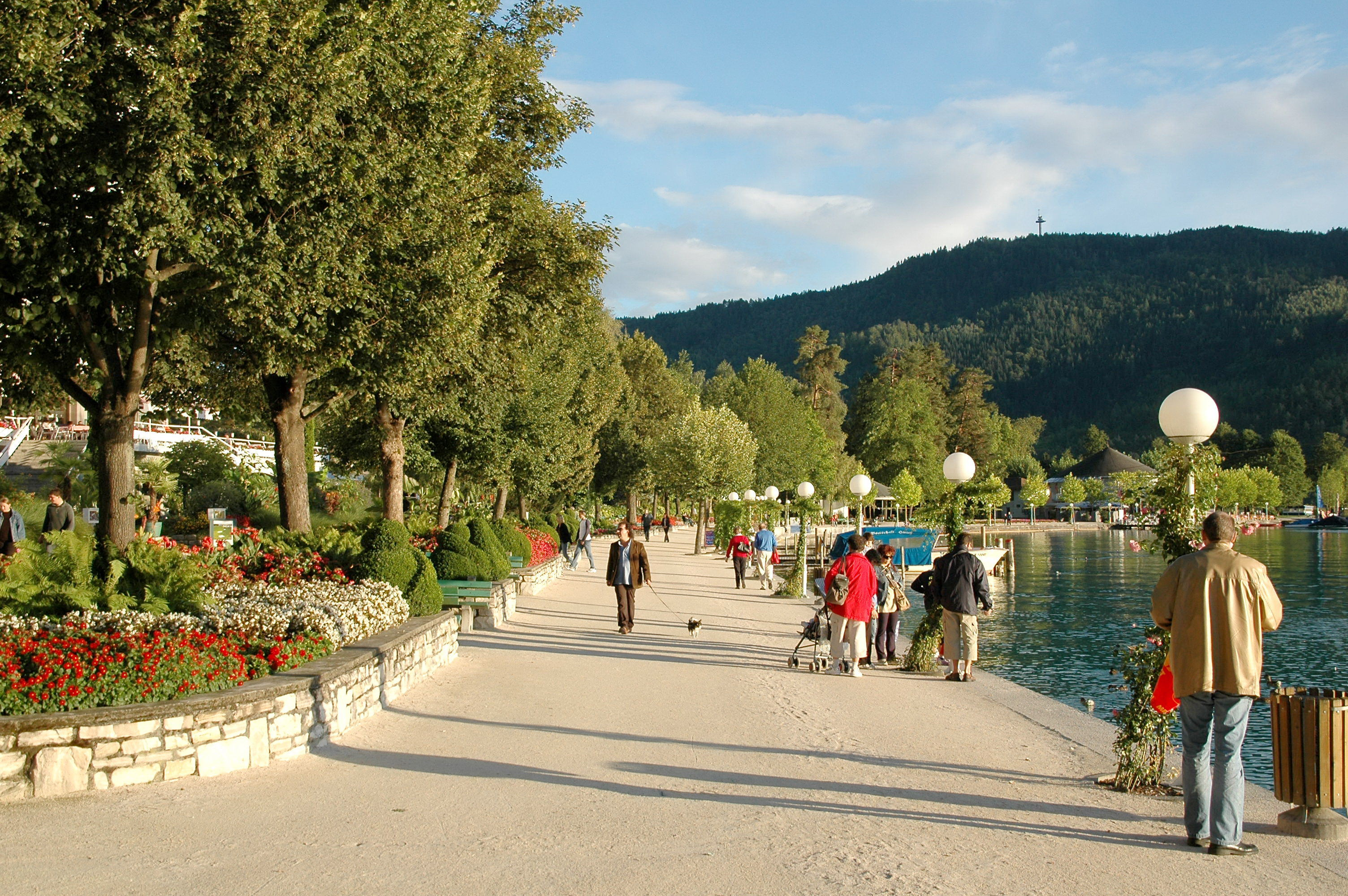
Lakeside promenade

== History ==
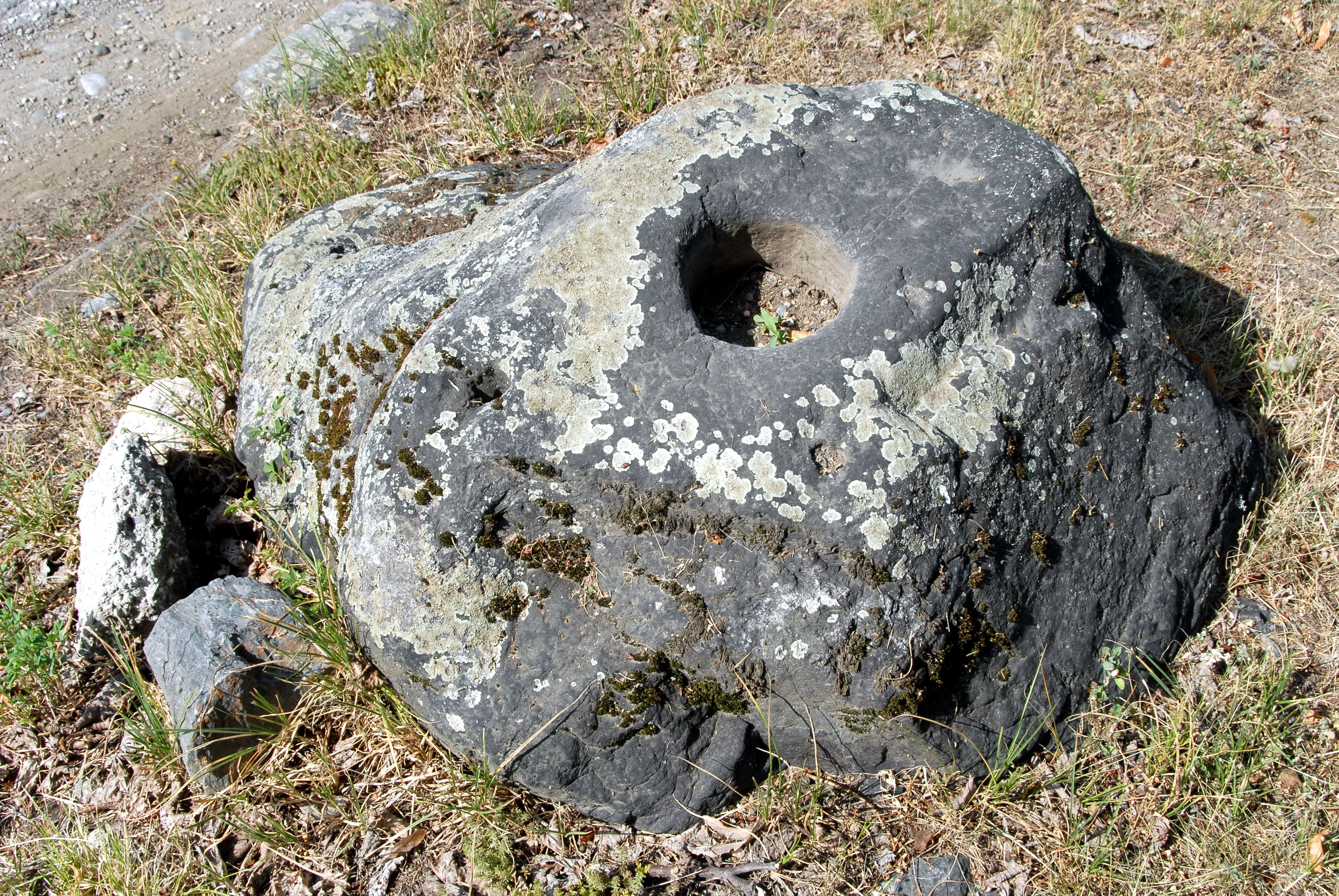
Basin stone

Basin stones with cup marks most presumably come from the Stone Age and can still be seen in many parts of Carinthia. There is also one to be seen in Pörtschach, just next to a basswood tree with a park bench and next to a wooden cross. During the cultic ceremony the sacrifice, most probably blood, was placed in the little basin hole of the rock.

According to archaeological findings, the Noricum main road from Velden to Krumpendorf already led across the community's territory in the Roman period. During the Slavic settlement of the Eastern Alps about 600 a settlement was founded, based on onomastic evidence (Slavic porecah = 'at the people who live by the brook'). In 1150 Pörtschach in the Duchy of Carinthia was first attested in written sources. In those days a lake castle was set up, of which little else than some scant remains of a wall can be seen to this day. A parish church was first mentioned in 1328, initially a filial church of Maria Wörth, the present-day building was erected in 1787 and restored in a Neo-Renaissance style in 1904/06.

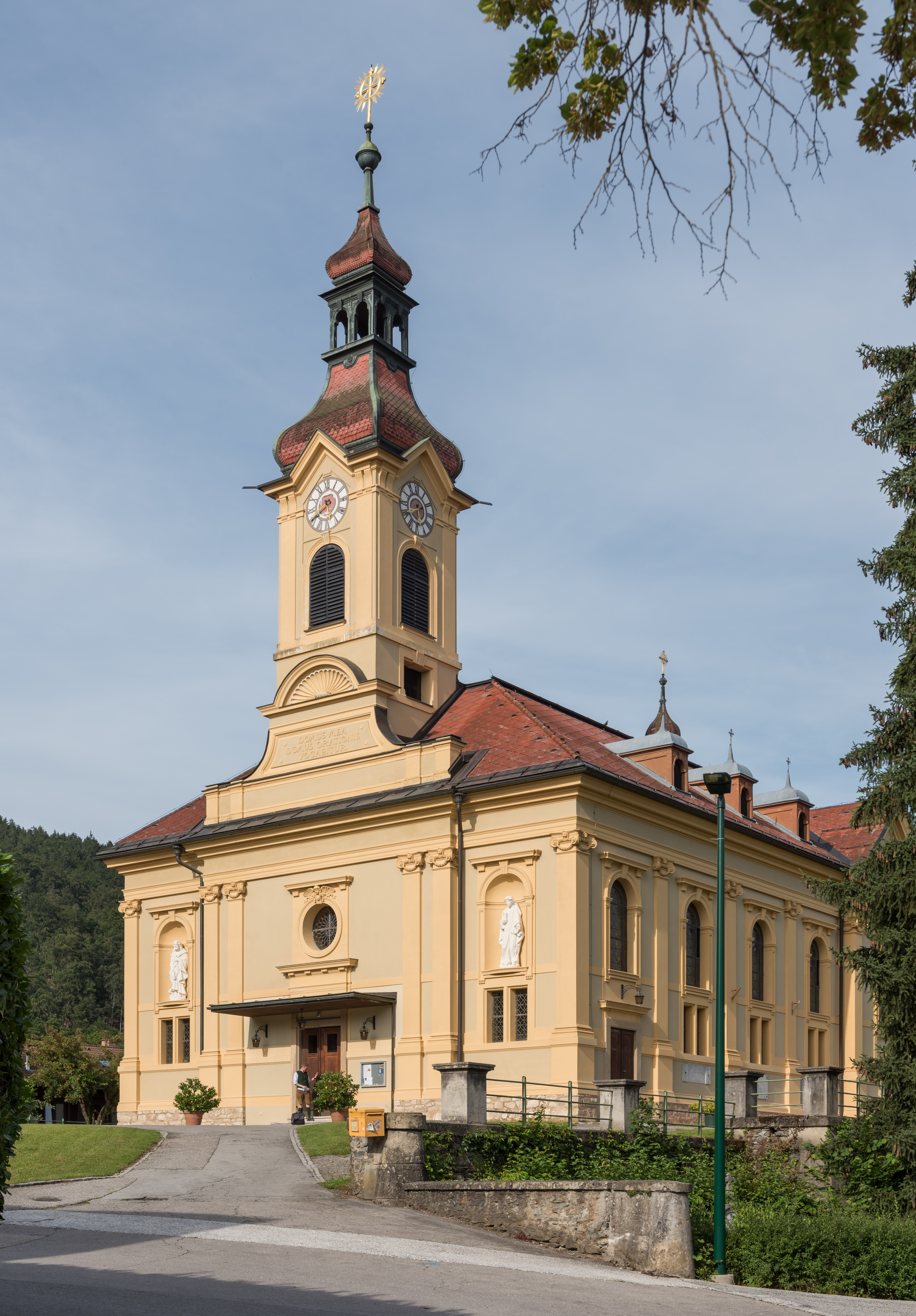
Parish church Saint John the Baptist

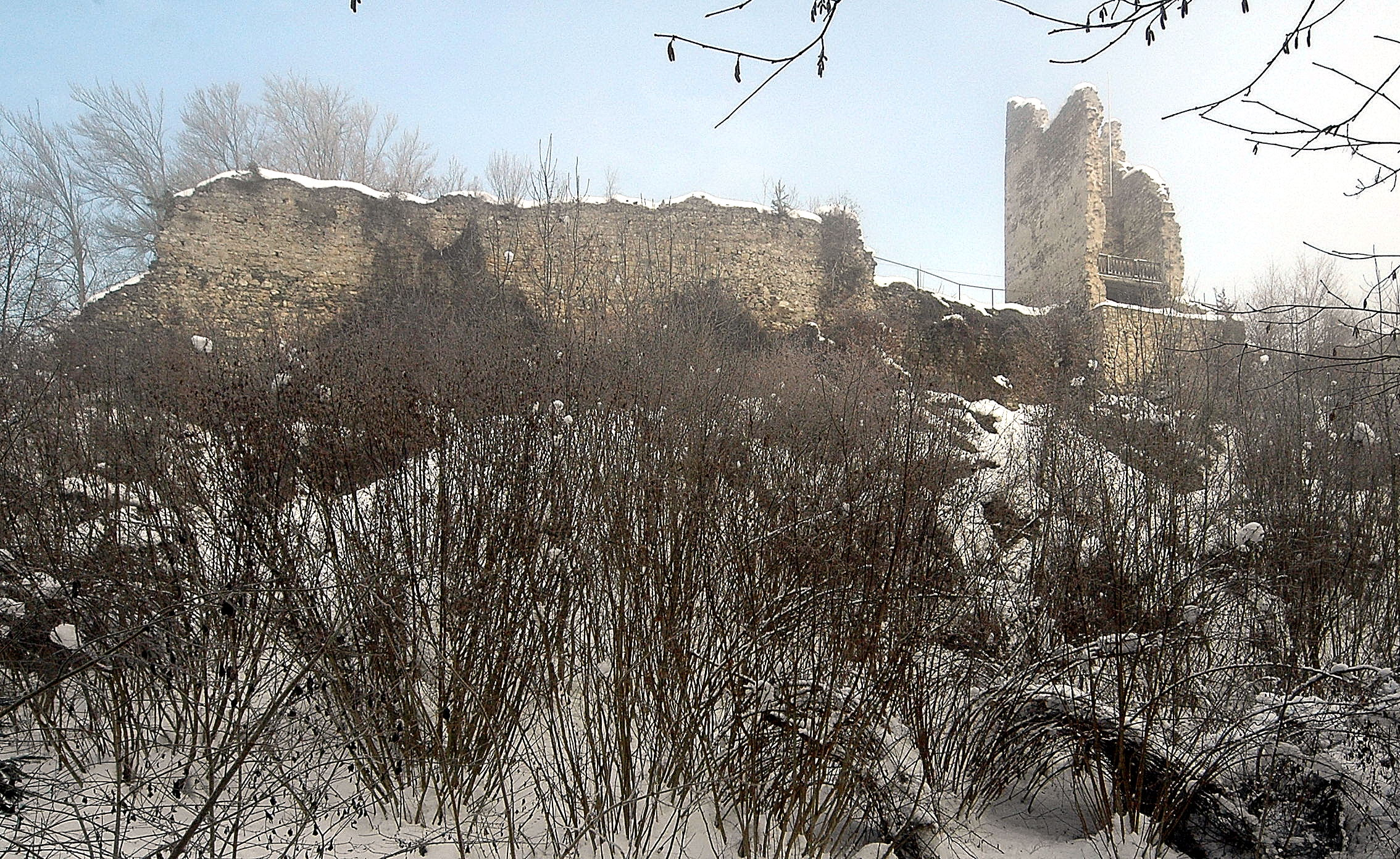
Leonstein Castle ruins

The nearby medieval Leonstein Castle had already fallen into disrepair by the late 17th century, but it has recently benefited from a restoration programme. It was replaced around 1490, when neighbouring Leonstain Castle was erected close to Pörtschach's centre. Today part of the Renaissance castle has been reborn as a hotel.

A growing tourism industry started in the mid-19th century, accelerating after the establishment of the Lake Wörth navy in 1853. Shortly after that, in 1864, Pörtschach received a railway station on the new Southern Railway line from Vienna to Venice; this made it a favoured tourist destination. Famous tourists from Vienna included Emperor Franz Josef I of Austria, Gustav Mahler, and Johannes Brahms, who worked on his Second Symphony and his Violin Concerto here. After the tourism boom years in Carinthia of the 1960s and 1970s, a revival in Pörtschach as an events centre is under way. The goal is to develop as a "sustainable tourist attraction" affiliated to nature, culture and history.

== Demographics ==
According to the census of 2001, the community of Pörtschach has 2,670 inhabitants. 90.3% have Austrian citizenship, the biggest groups among the foreign nationalities are Croatians (3.0%), Germans (2.3%), and Bosnia-Herzegovinians (1.3%).

In terms of religion, the majority of the people are Roman Catholics (75%), followed by 10% Protestants and 1.6% Muslims. About 10% of the people do not affiliate with any religion.

As of 1 January 2025, Pörtschach am Wörther See has a population of 3,002.

== Lake villas ==
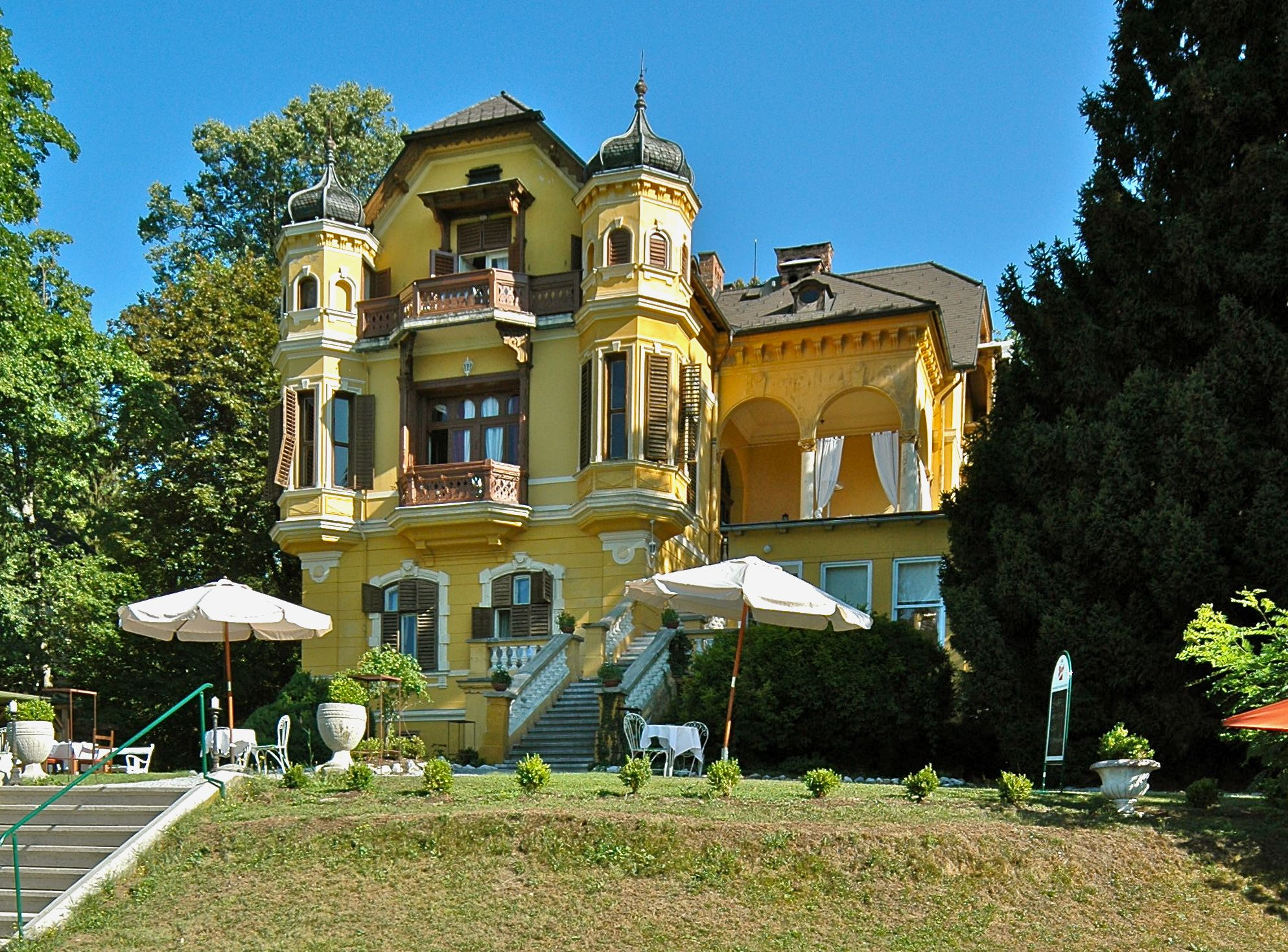
Villa Miralago, 1893

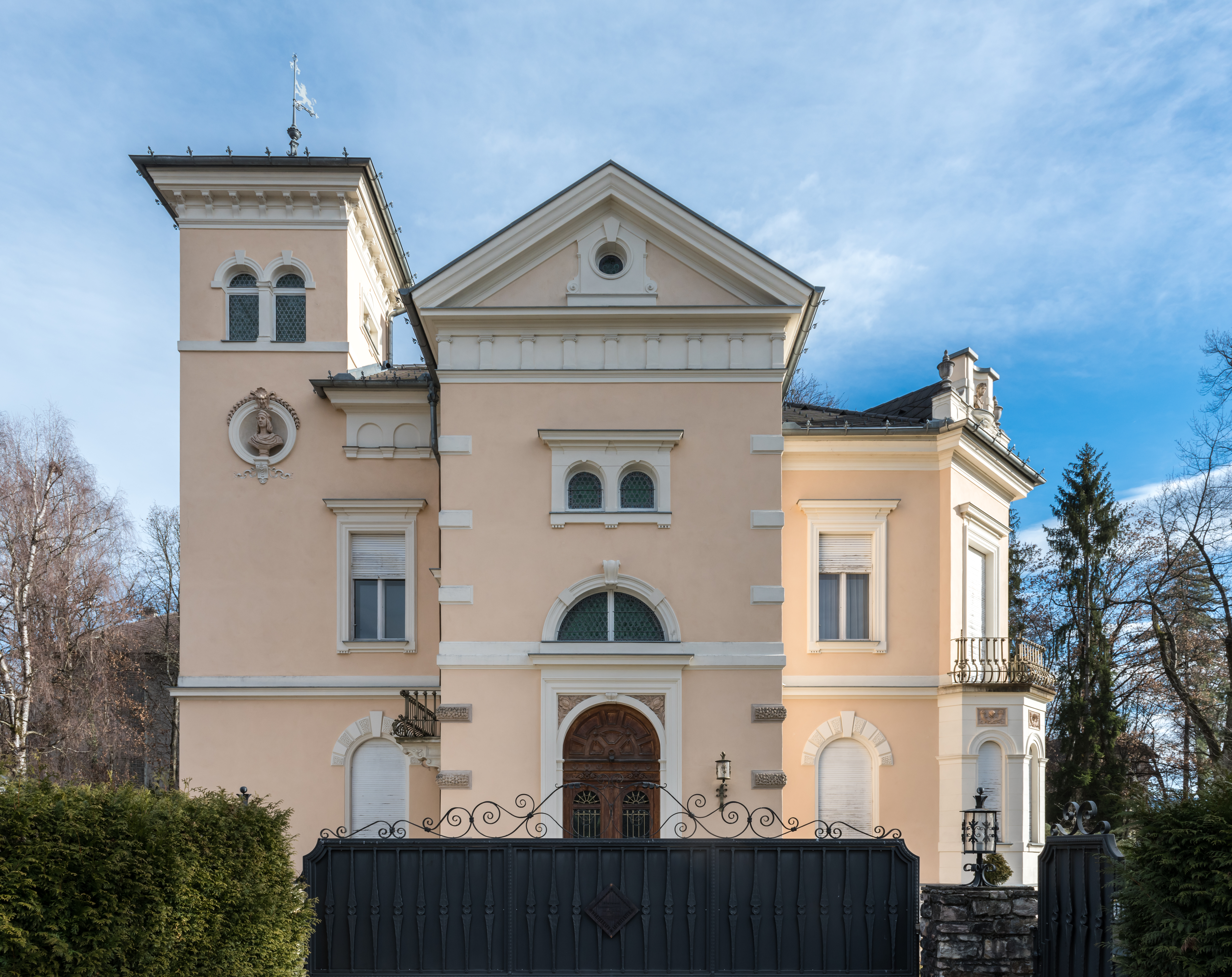
Villa Venezia, 1891

In the late 19th and early 20th century, numerous villas were erected in the so-called Wörthersee style, according to Friedrich Achleitner a mix of Art Nouveau, German Romanticism, Baroque and mansion architecture. The most important representants of this specific building style were Franz Baumgartner (1876–1946), Wilhelm Heß (1846–1916), Josef Victor Fuchs, and Carl Langhammer (1840–1906).

== Politics ==
The municipal council (Gemeinderat) consists of 19 members. Since the 2021 Carinthian local elections, it is made up of the following parties:

- Austrian People's Party (ÖVP): 10 seats
- Freedom Party of Austria (FPÖ): 4 seats
- Social Democratic Party of Austria (SPÖ): 3 seats
- The Greens - The Green Alternative (Grüne): 2 seats

=== Twin towns — sister cities ===
Pörtschach is twinned with:

- Rivignano, Italy

== Notable people ==
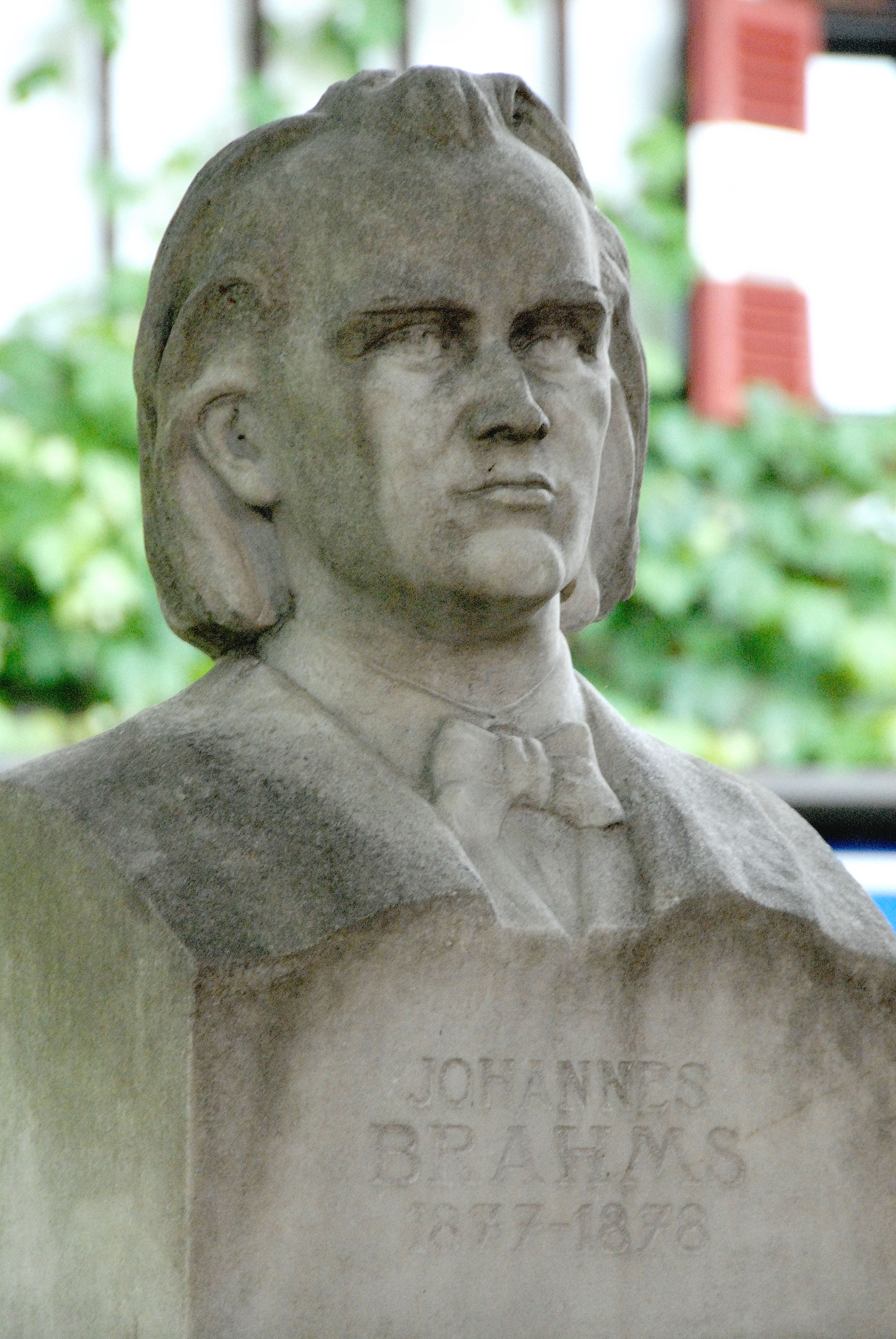
Bust of Johannes Brahms at the Leonstain Castle Hotel

Johannes Brahms spent the summers of 1877 to 1879 in Pörtschach. In a letter to Clara Schumann he recounted how he stopped off on his voyage to Vienna for overnight lodging and found the next day so pleasant that on the second day he decided to stay for the time being. Pörtschach is the site of an annual International Johannes Brahms Competition.

== Literature ==
- Österreichische Kunst-Topographie. (Austrian art topography) Volume I.: Herzogthum Karnten (Dutchy Carinthia), Wien 1889, S. 284; in Commission bei Kubasta & Voigt, of the K. K. Hof- und Staatsdruckerei.
- DEHIO Kärnten - Topographisches Denkmälerinventar (Topografic monument inventory), S. 636–644. Editorial Anton Schroll & Co, Wien 2001, ISBN 3-7031-0712-X
- Kärntner Sagen (Carinthian sagas), a selection by Dr. Georg Graber, 1949; S. 50–52, Kärntner Heimatverlag (Carinthian homeland editorial).
- Die Kärntner Gemeindewappen (The Carinthian community coat of arms) by Dr. Wilhelm Deuer, S. 216–217; Klagenfurt 2006, Editorial of the Carinthian country archive, ISBN 3-900531-64-1
