= Glan (Gurk) =

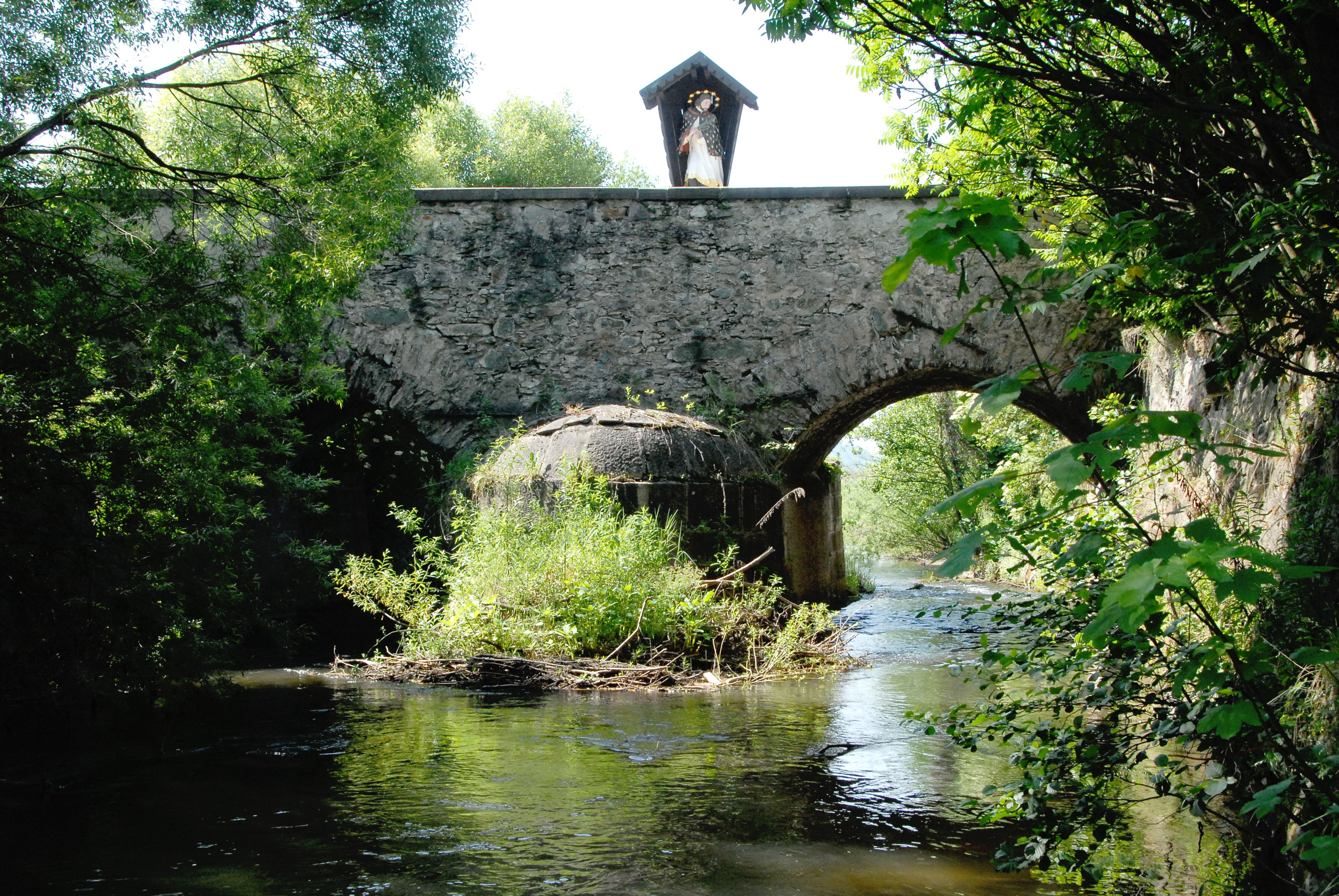
- St John of Nepomuk Bridge in Sankt Veit

Location
- Country: Austria
- State: Carinthia

Physical characteristics
- Source
  - location: Ossiacher Tauern near Techelsberg
- Mouth
  - location: Gurk
  - coordinates: 46.6033°N 14.4245°E
- Length: 64.3 km (40.0 mi)
- Basin size: 825.2 km^{2} (318.6 sq mi)

Basin features
- Progression: Gurk→ Drava→ Danube→ Black Sea

The Glan (German pronunciation: [ɡlaːn]; Slovene: Glina) is a river in Carinthia, Austria, a right tributary of the Gurk. It is 64.3 km (40.0 mi) long. Its drainage basin is 825.2 km^{2} (318.6 sq mi).

It rises north of the Wörthersee in the Ossiach Tauern, then running through Feldkirchen, going northeastwards passing the castle Burgruine Glanegg until it reaches Sankt Veit where it bends sharply towards south. It flows through the Zollfeld Valley, the historical heart of the Carinthian duchy, and through Klagenfurt, the state capital. At Ebenthal southeast of Klagenfurt is the confluence with the Glanfurt River, the Glan bends eastwards and finally flows into the river Gurk.

It was first mentioned as Glana in a deed of donation issued by Emperor Otto II at the 983 Reichstag in Verona. The name derives from Celtic (Noric) glanos meaning "bright, clear", cf. Glanis, Glanum, Glen and English "clean".
