= Glanfurt =

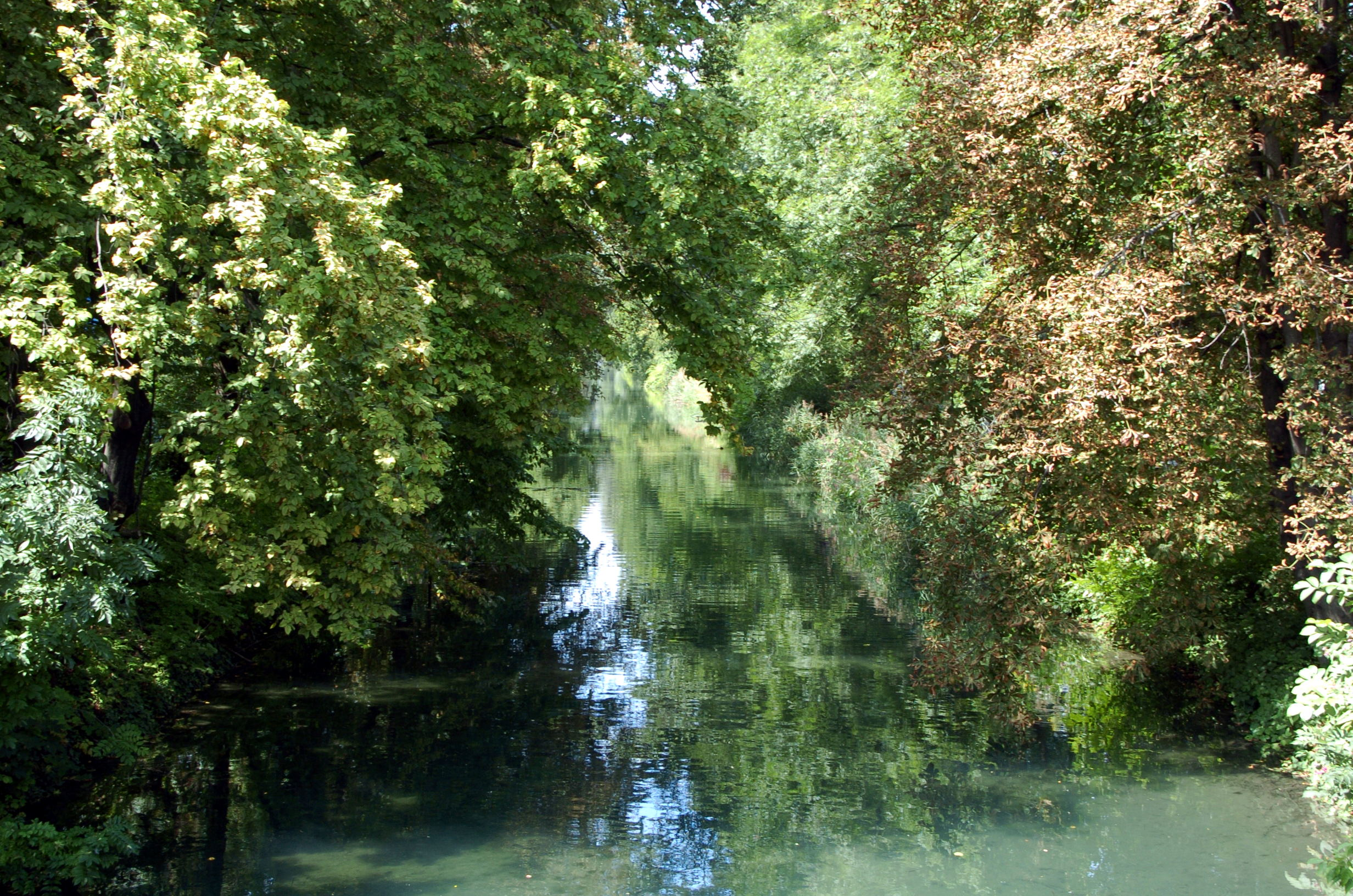
- Glanfurt near Klagenfurt

Location
- Country: Austria
- State: Carinthia

Physical characteristics
- Source
  - location: Wörthersee
  - coordinates: 46°36′49″N 14°15′5″E
- Mouth
  - location: Glan
  - coordinates: 46.6105°N 14.3561°E
- Length: 9.1 km (5.7 mi)
- Basin size: 230 km^{2} (89 sq mi)

Basin features
- Progression: Glan→ Gurk→ Drava→ Danube→ Black Sea

Glanfurt is a river of Carinthia, Austria. Its drainage basin is 230 km^{2} (89 sq mi).

The Glanfurt is also called Sattnitz by the Carinthian people. It is the outflow of the Wörthersee. It starts at the lake's eastern bay, south of the peninsula Maria Loretto and runs more like a channel straight to the east. It passes Viktring Abbey, an old monastery which is now a suburb of Carinthia's capital Klagenfurt, and finally flows into the Glan near the market town of Ebenthal. In summer it is the southern recreation area of Klagenfurt with a number of opportunities for free bathing and a bicycle track along the river.

The river was to become a national borderline following the Paris Peace Conference, 1919, which then had not been established according to the results of the 1920 Carinthian Plebiscite.
