= Burgruine Moosburg/Arnulfsfeste =

Castle ruin in Austria

Coordinates: 46.660°N 14.158°E

- Moosburg, Carinthia, Austria
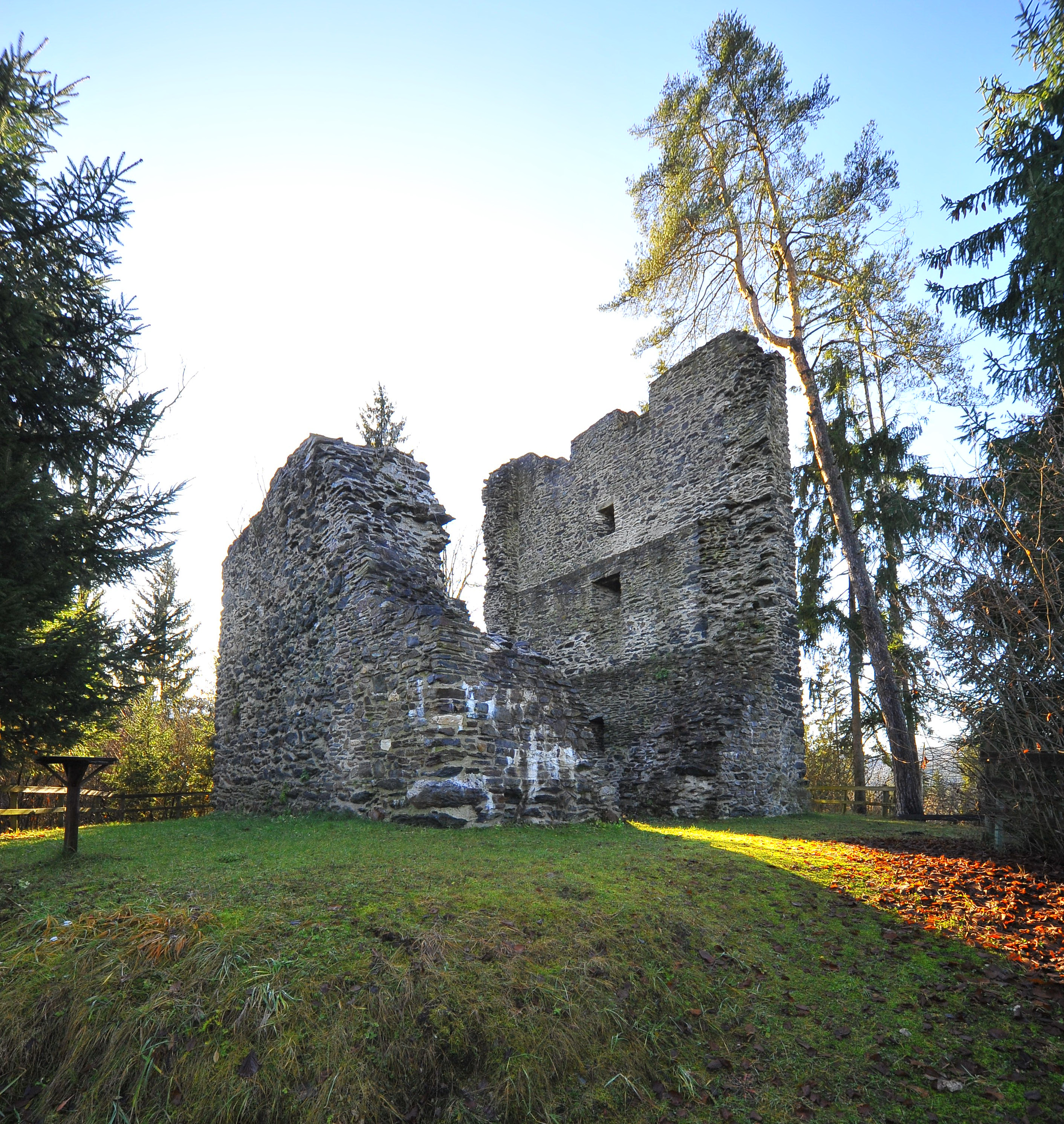

Site information
- Type: Hilltop castle

Site history
- Built: first mention 879

Burgruine Moosburg/Arnulfsfeste is a castle in Carinthia, Austria, near the town of Moosburg. In the modern day, it is a hotel.

== See also ==
- List of castles in Austria
