= Wörthersee =

Lake in the southern Austrian state of Carinthia

Wörthersee Lake Wörth
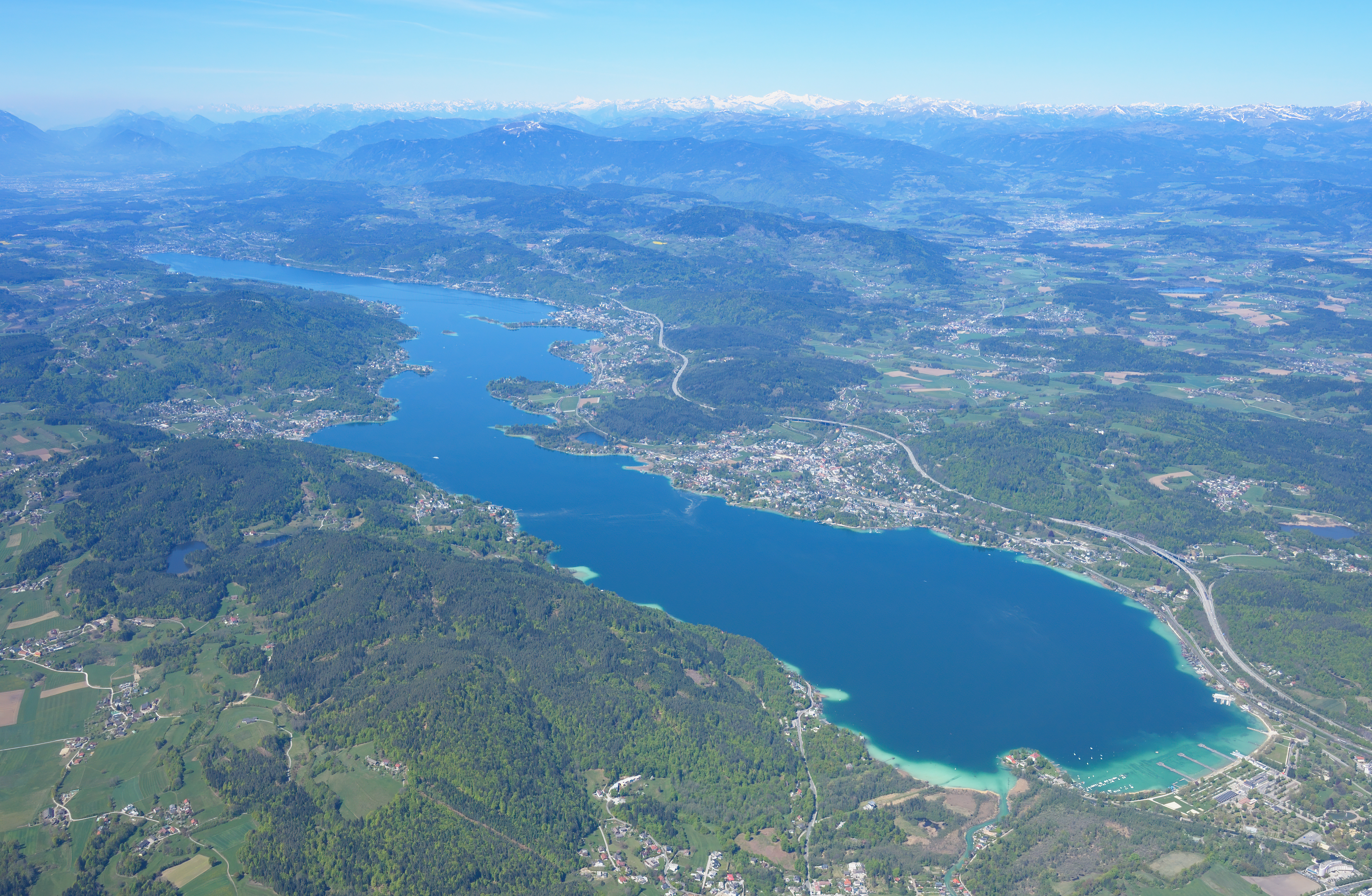
- Aerial view of Wörthersee

- Location within Austria

- Location: Carinthia
- Coordinates: 46°37′30″N 14°09′00″E
- Primary inflows: Reifnitzbach, Pirkerbach
- Primary outflows: Glanfurt
- Catchment area: 162.23 km^{2} (62.64 sq mi)
- Basin countries: Austria
- Max. length: 16.5 km (10.3 mi)
- Max. width: 1.7 km (1.1 mi)
- Surface area: 19.39 km^{2} (7.49 sq mi)
- Average depth: 42.1 m (138 ft)
- Max. depth: 85.2 m (280 ft)
- Residence time: 10.5 years
- Surface elevation: 439 m (1,440 ft)
- Islands: Schlangeninsel, Kapuzinerinsel
- Settlements: Klagenfurt, Velden, Pörtschach, Krumpendorf, Maria Wörth

Wörthersee (German pronunciation: [ˈvœʁtɐˌzeː]; Slovene: Vrbsko jezero, English: Lake Wörth) is a lake in the southern Austrian state of Carinthia. The bathing lake is a main tourist destination in summer.

== Geography ==
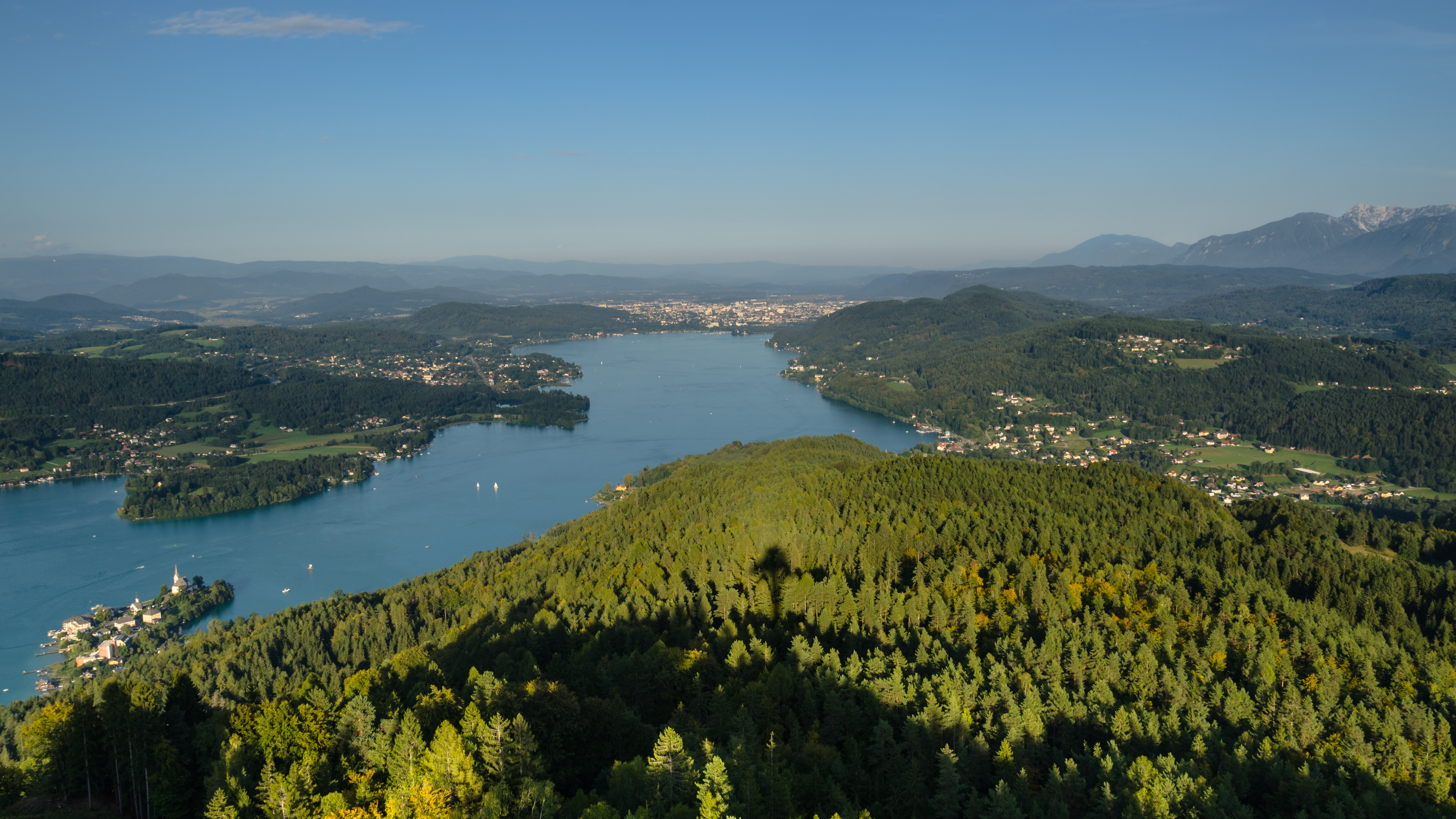
View from Pyramidenkogel

Wörthersee is Carinthia's largest lake. It is elongated, about 16.5 km (10.3 mi) long and 1.5 km (0.93 mi) wide, and stretches from the outskirts of the Carinthian capital Klagenfurt in the east to the bay of Velden in the west. Situated within the Klagenfurt Basin, its shores are flanked to the north and south by the foothills of the Gurktal Alps and the Karawanks range, all covered with dense forests beyond which snow-capped Alpine peaks are visible. The lake's water is of a distinctive blue-green colour and transparent.

Lake Wörth and its basin in the central Carinthian foothills were largely formed by glaciers during the last ice age. The lake is divided into three basins by several islands and peninsulas. The western basin stretches from Velden to Pörtschach, the central basin from Pörtschach to Maria Wörth and the eastern basin from Maria Wörth to Klagenfurt. Numerous brooks flow into the lake; its sole outlet is the Glanfurt river in the east, eventually flowing into the Drava (Drau) river via the Glan and Gurk tributaries.

The northern shore is densely built up with the main resort towns of Krumpendorf, Pörtschach, and Velden. The Süd Autobahn motorway and a railway mainline occupy the narrow space between the steep hills and the shore. The southern shore is quieter and less developed.

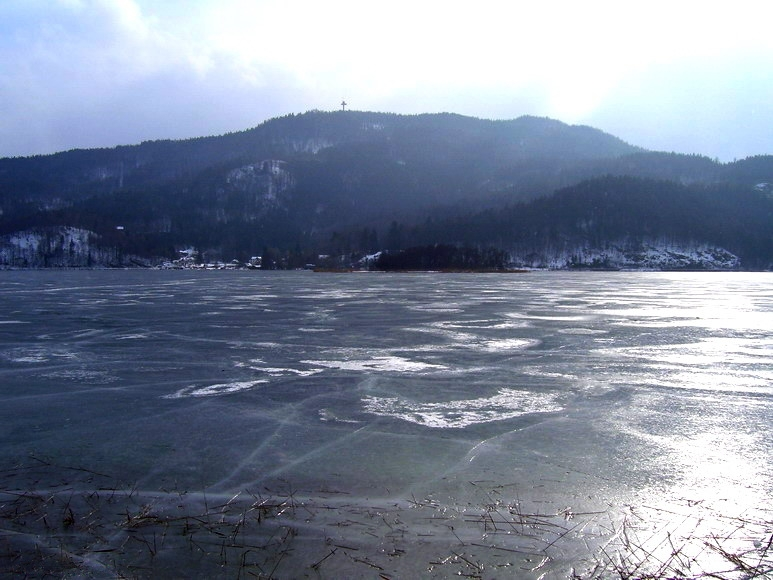
In winter the lake sometimes freezes.

The water surface (epilimnion) can reach up to 25 °C in summer. In winter, the region is often covered by snow and approximately every 10 years the lake freezes over, attracting numerous ice skaters. Lake Wörth's fauna is dominated by fish typically found in alpine lakes. The most common species are the pike (Esox lucius) and the common whitefish (Coregonus lavaretus).

== Etymology ==
First mentioned as Werdse in an 1143 deed, the lake's name originates from the islands in the lake, most notably Maria Wörth, a peninsula since the building of the Glanfurt outlet in 1770. Other islands are Schlangeninsel and Kapuzinerinsel; the former island of Maria Loretto is today also a peninsula. Until the 19th century the lake was called "Werdersee" (cf. Old High German weride: "island" or "ait"), i.e. "Island Lake", but also Klagenfurt Lake or Velden Lake (as in Slovene: Vrbsko jezero).

== Tourism ==
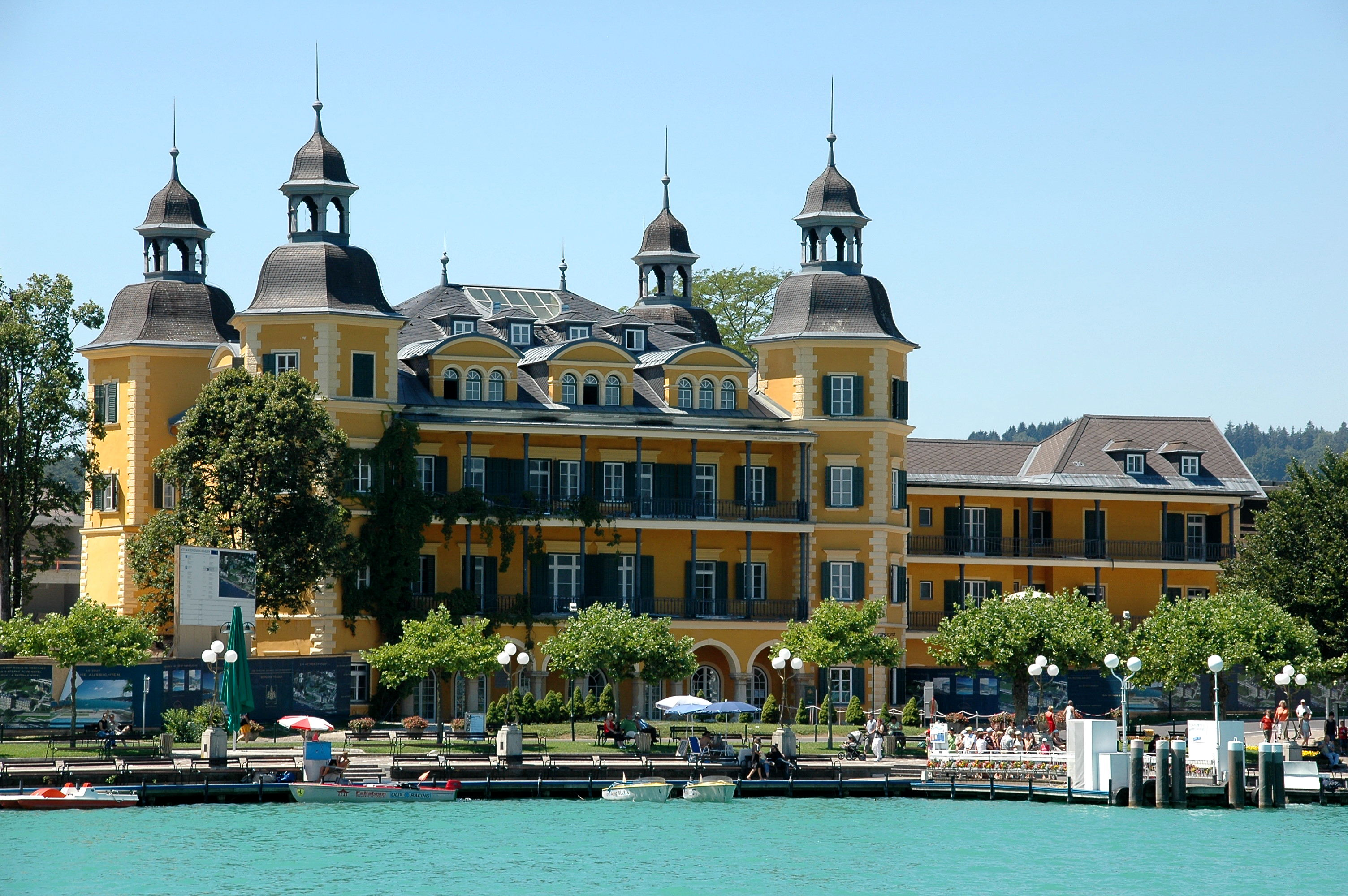
Velden Castle

In the early 19th century the marshy shores were home only to a handful of poor peasants. The opening of the Austrian Southern Railway line (Südbahn) to Klagenfurt in 1863, later extended to Villach along the northern shore, quickly turned the Wörthersee into an exclusive summer retreat for Vienna's nobility and wealthy bourgeoisie. Especially Velden and Pörtschach developed to main tourist resorts.

Up to today, the Mediterranean climate and the clean, warm waters make Lake Wörth a popular tourist destination in summer. Although the region around the lake has been termed "Austria's Monte Carlo", in recent decades tourism around Lake Wörthersee has suffered from tough competition from package holidays to cheaper overseas destinations. As a response a number of local businesses have tried to focus on niches such as high quality tourism, family tourism or golf and horse-riding vacations.

Most tourists visit the Lake in the months of July and August when water temperatures reach 25 °C. A large proportion of visitors return every summer and some own or rent holiday homes along the shore. The vast majority of visitors come from Vienna, northern Germany and the Netherlands.

The largest Volkswagen and Audi car show in Europe, the Wörthersee GTI-Treffen (in English, "Wörthersee Meeting" or simply "Wörthersee"), has been held in the lakeside town of Reifnitz (usually in May) every year from 1982 to 2021 (the 2022 event was cancelled due to the organisational problems). The municipality have announced in February 2023 that no GTI-Treffen would be permitted anymore. The organisers issued the statement: "the effects of climate change, the responsibility of political decision-makers for the preservation of ecosystems, and the need to align actions at all levels according to the principles of sustainability make it necessary to place the future design under new premises. On the basis of these considerations, we can state the municipality of Maria Worth will no longer host any conventional major automotive events in the next few years."

== Transportation ==
The A2 Süd Autobahn motorway (European Route E66) from Vienna to Italy passes along the northern side of the lake, as does the B83 Kärntner Straße highway connecting Klagenfurt with Villach and the Südbahn railway line from Vienna to Venice. There is also a cycle path along the northern shore. In summer, passenger boats connect the largest settlements. The number of private speedboats is strictly limited by a quota system to limit the environmental damage and hazard to swimmers.
