= Moosburg, Austria =

Moosburg
- Municipality
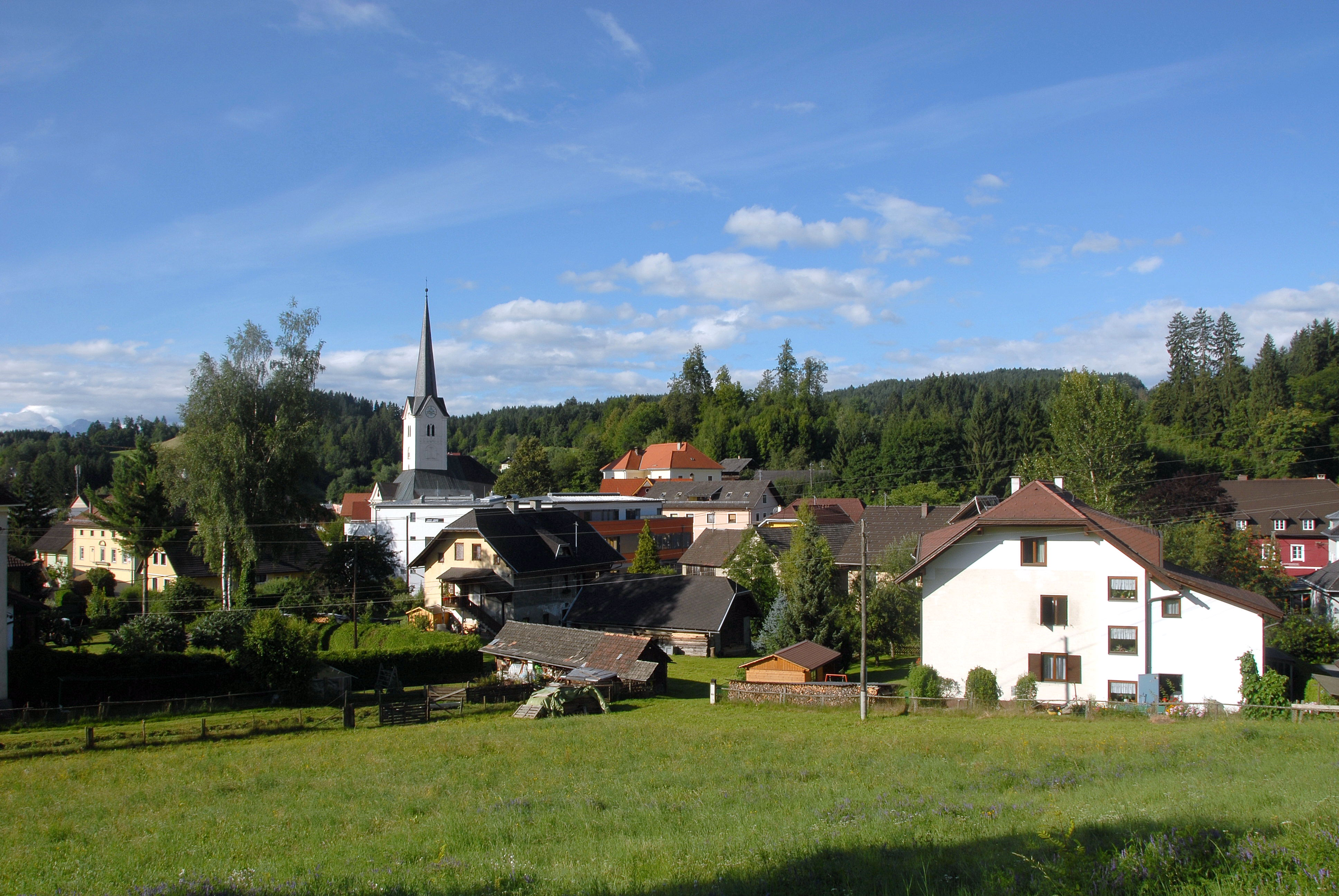

- Flag Coat of arms

- Location within Austria
- Coordinates: 46°39′29″N 14°10′28″E
- Country: Austria
- State: Carinthia
- District: Klagenfurt-Land

Government
  - Mayor: Herbert Gaggl (ÖVP)

Area
  - Total: 36.76 km^{2} (14.19 sq mi)
- Elevation: 503 m (1,650 ft)

Population (2018-01-01)
  - Total: 4,482
  - Density: 121.9/km^{2} (315.8/sq mi)
- Time zone: UTC+1 (CET)
  - Summer (DST): UTC+2 (CEST)
- Postal code: 9062
- Area code: 04262
- Website: www.moosburg.gv.at

Moosburg (Austrian German pronunciation: [ˈmoːsbʊrɡ]; Slovene: Možberk) is a market town in the Klagenfurt-Land district in the Austrian state of Carinthia.

== Geography ==
It is located in the Klagenfurt Basin on the B 95 Turracher Straße federal highway, northwest of the state capital. In the south, Moosburg borders the municipalities of Pörtschach and Krumpendorf, both popular bathing resorts on the northern shore of Lake Wörth. The nearby Süd Autobahn (A2) can be reached via the Pörtschach and Krumpendorf junctions. The Old High German name moos ("mire") refers to several swamps and ponds around the settlement, remnants of the last glacial period and today a protected area.

The municipal area comprises the cadastral communities of Bärndorf, Gradenegg, Kreggab, Moosburg, Sankt Peter, Seigbichl (Žihpolje), Tigring (Tigrče), and Tuderschitz (Tudrešiče).

== History ==
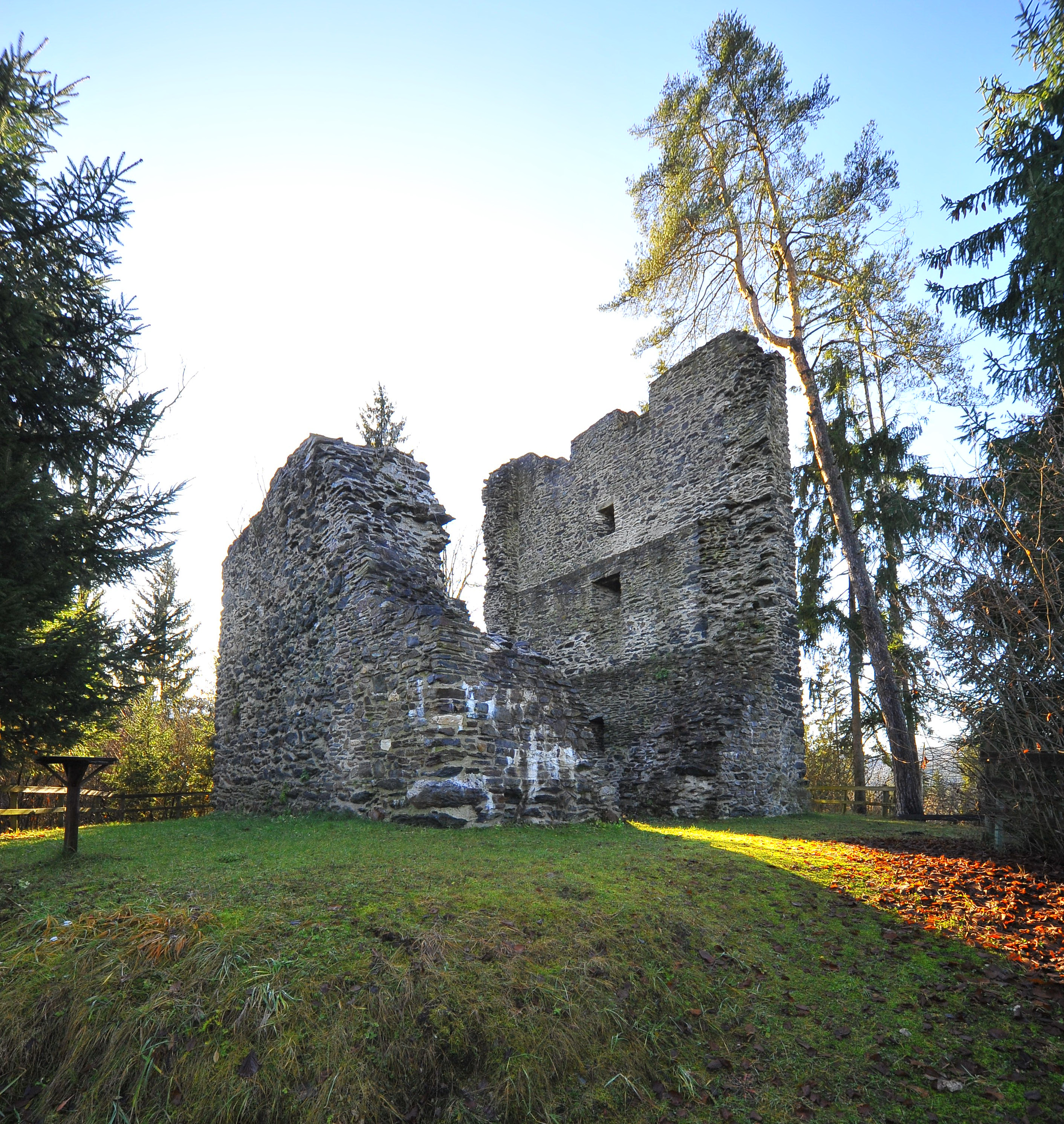
Arnulf Castle

The area had at least been settled since Roman times, when it was part of the Noricum province; documented by preserved sections of Roman roads and tombstones, as well as by excavations of an ancient villa rustica near the village of Tigring.

Moosburg proper is the site of the Arnulfsfeste, a hill castle first mentioned in an 879 deed. It was then located in the former Slavic principality of Carantania, which had become a Frankish march by the end of the 8th century. Arnulf of Carinthia, the Carolingian king of East Francia and Holy Roman Emperor, grew up here and used the castle as a Kaiserpfalz residence.

Part of the Duchy of Carinthia from 976, the Moosburg estate was later held by the noble House of Gorizia (Görz) which finally lost their remaining Carinthian possessions to the Habsburg emperor Frederick III about 1460. In the 16th century, the former Carolingian fortress was replaced by nearby Moosburg Castle and decayed.

The Gothic Sts Michael and George parish church was first mentioned in a 1368 deed, it was rebuilt after demolitions by Ottoman forces in 1479. A Baroque east facade was added in the late 18th century.

The present-day municipality was constituted in 1850, it has obtained the status of a market town in 1997.

== Politics ==
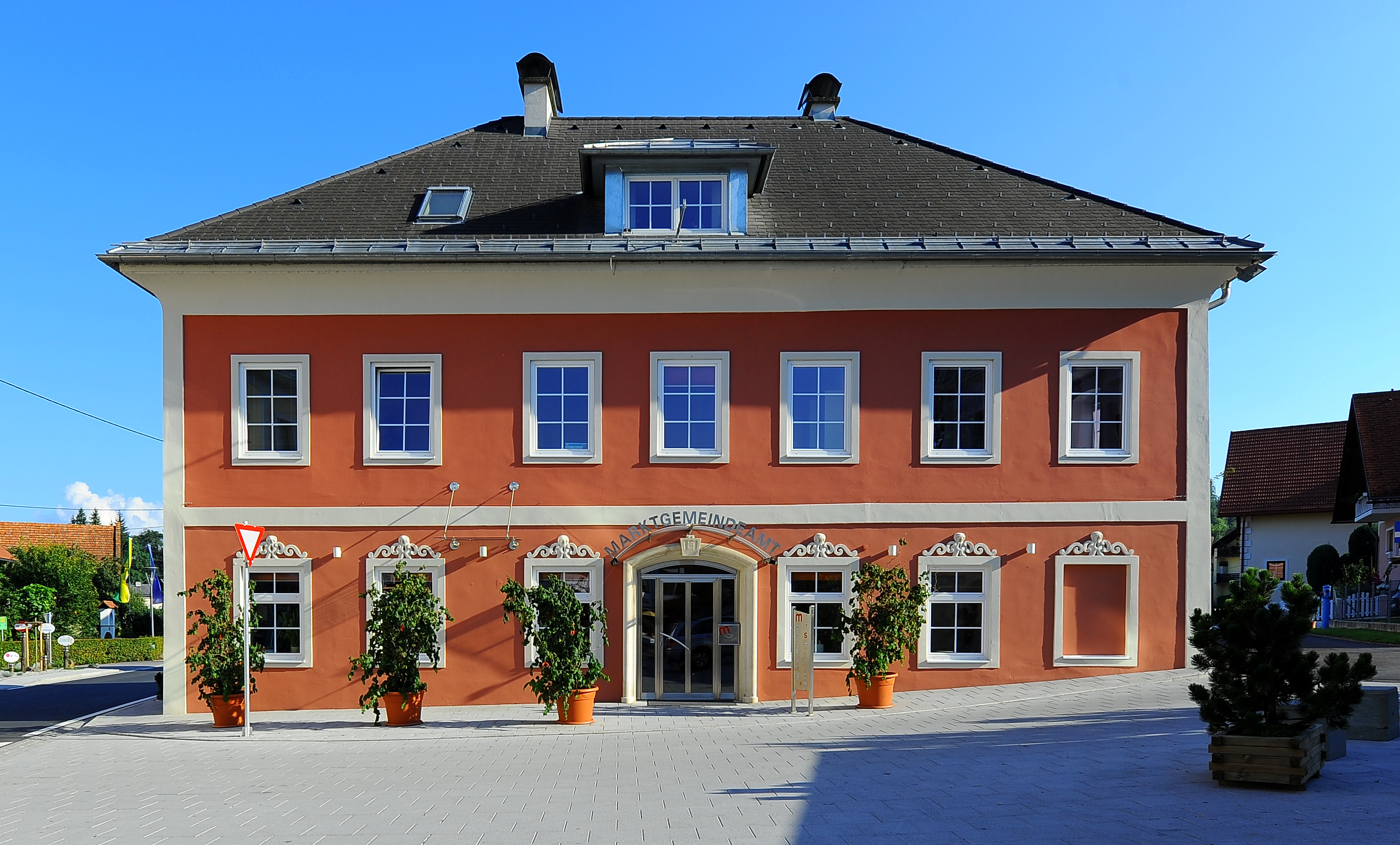
Town hall

Seats in the municipal assembly (Gemeinderat) as of 2015 local elections:

- Austrian People's Party (ÖVP): 11
- Liste GEMA (independent): 5
- Social Democratic Party of Austria (SPÖ): 4
- Freedom Party of Austria (FPÖ): 2
- The Greens: 1

== Twin towns ==
Moosburg is twinned with:

- Maintal, Germany, since 1976
- Moosburg an der Isar, Germany, since 1991
- Katerini, Greece, since 1996
