= Burgruine Leonstein =

Castle ruin in Austria

Coordinates: 46°38′21″N 14°07′45″E

- Carinthia, Austria
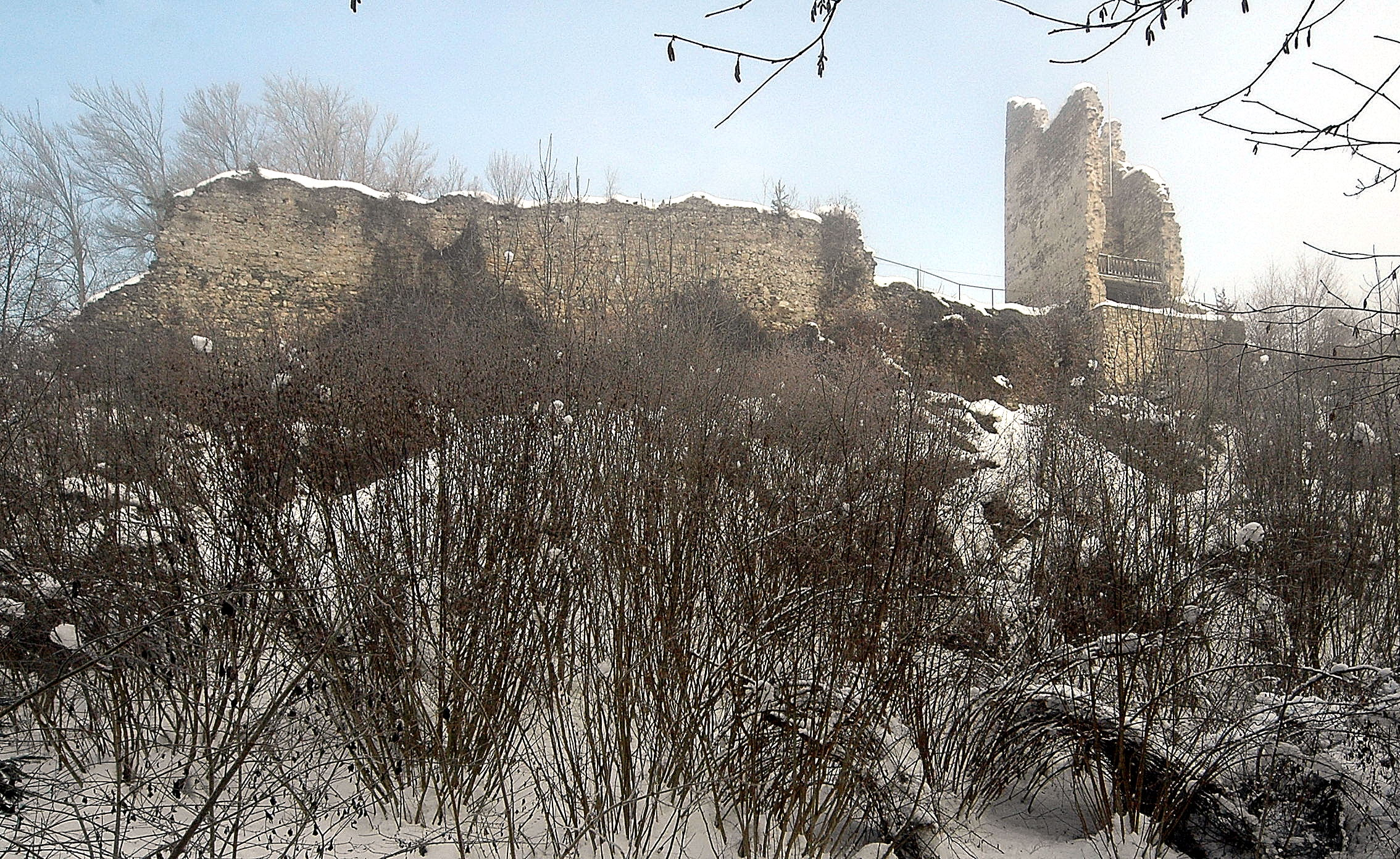
- Leonstein Castle ruin

Site information
- Type: Hilltop castle

Site history
- Built: 1166

Burgruine Leonstein is a medieval castle in Carinthia, Austria.

== Views of the castle ==
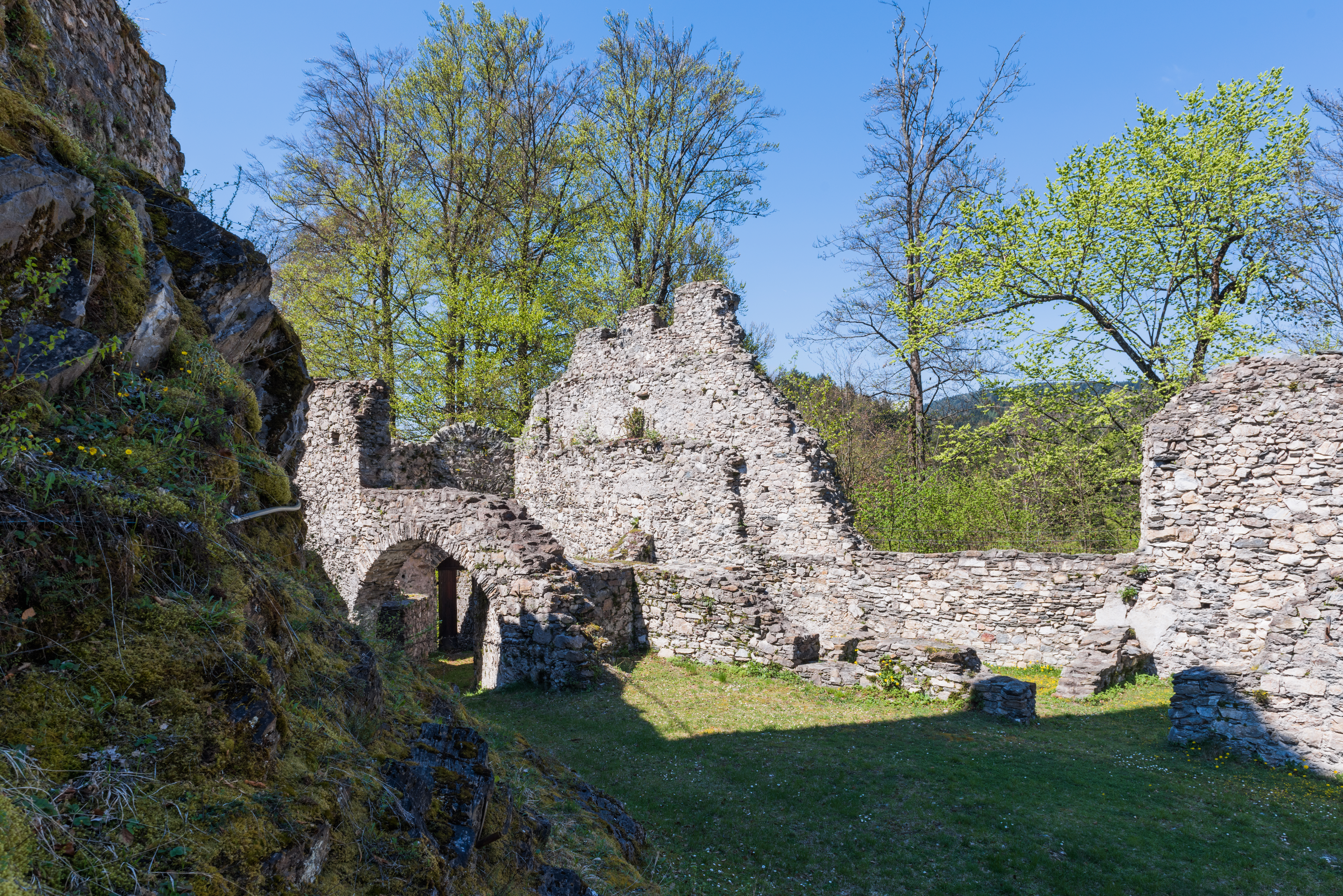

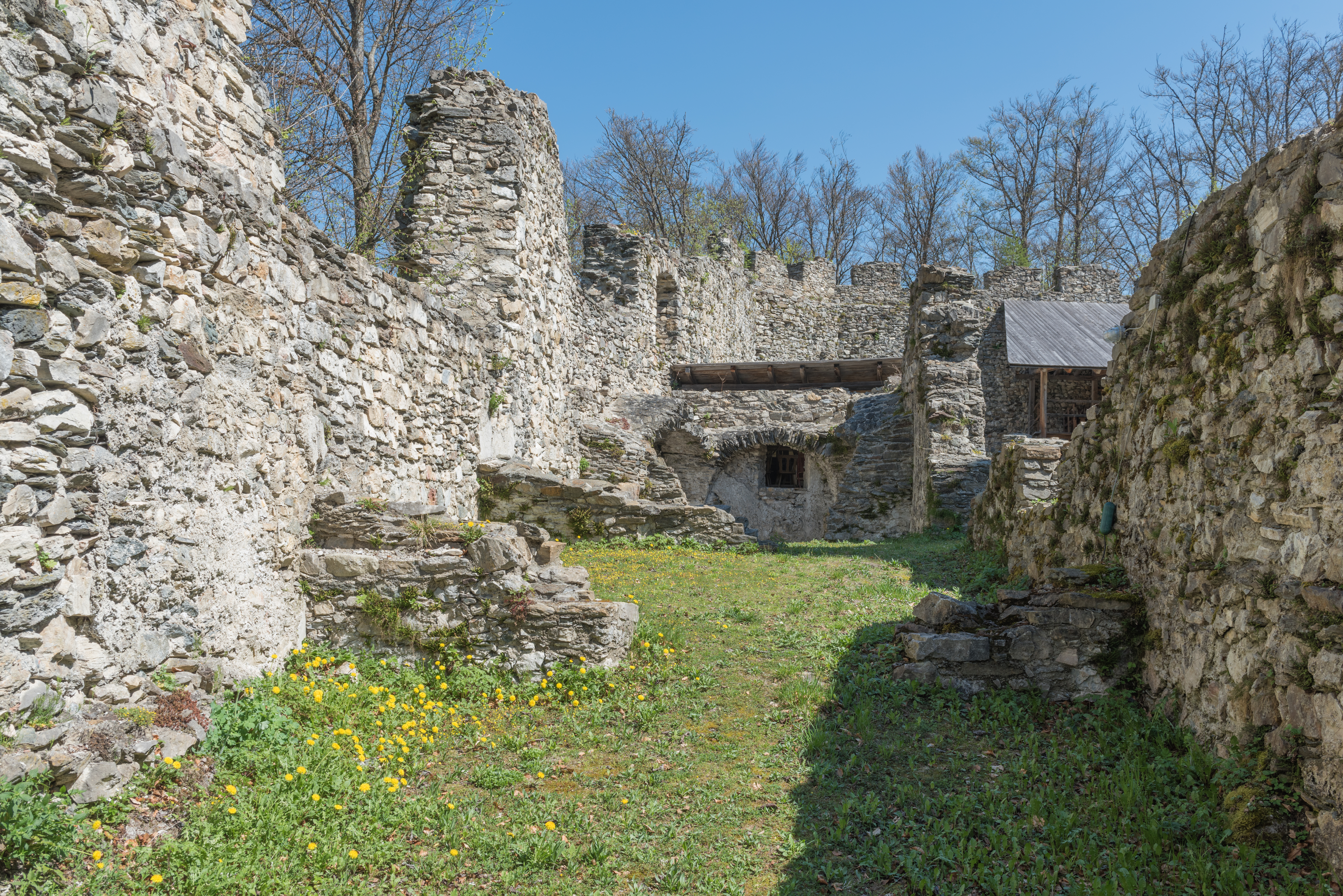

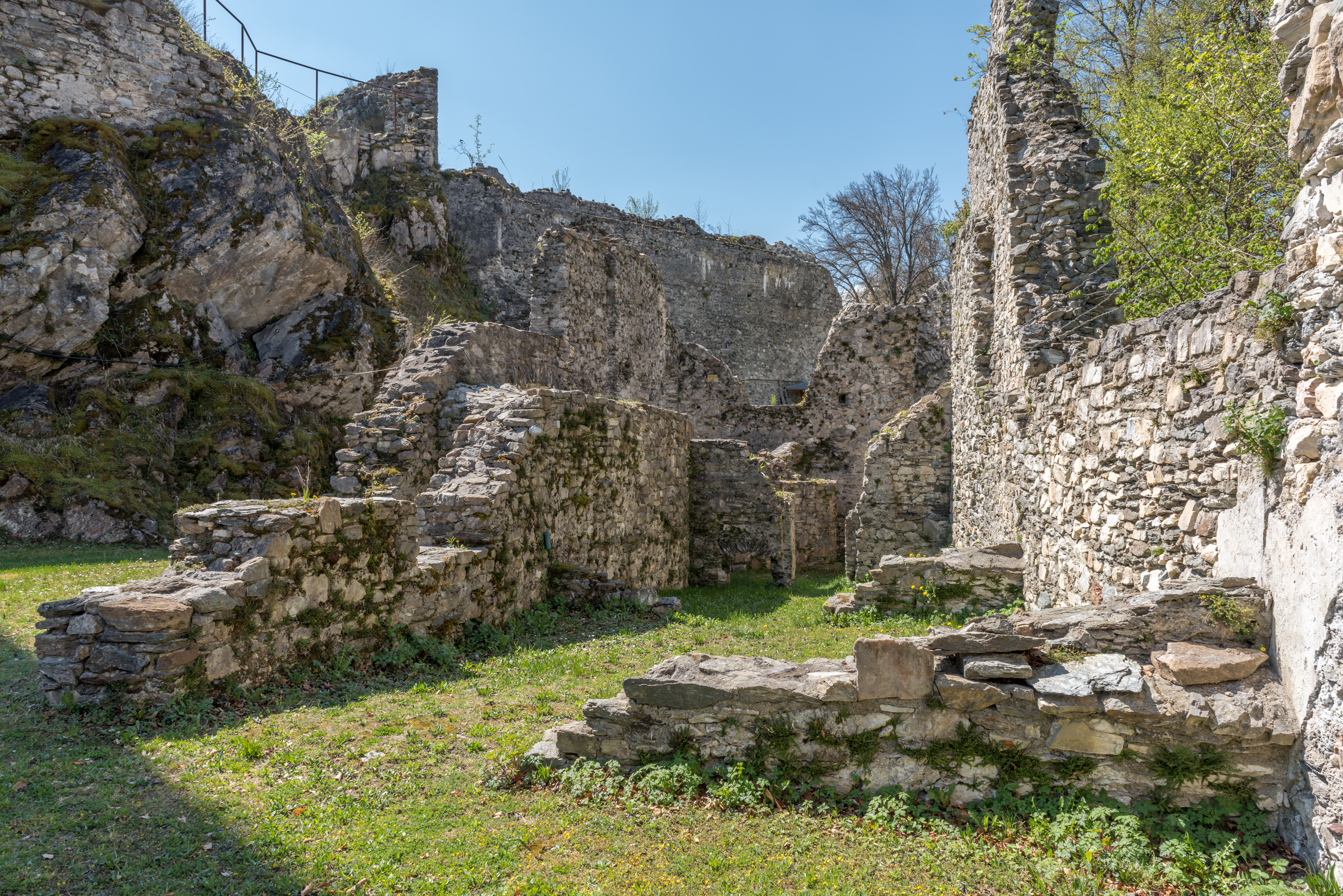

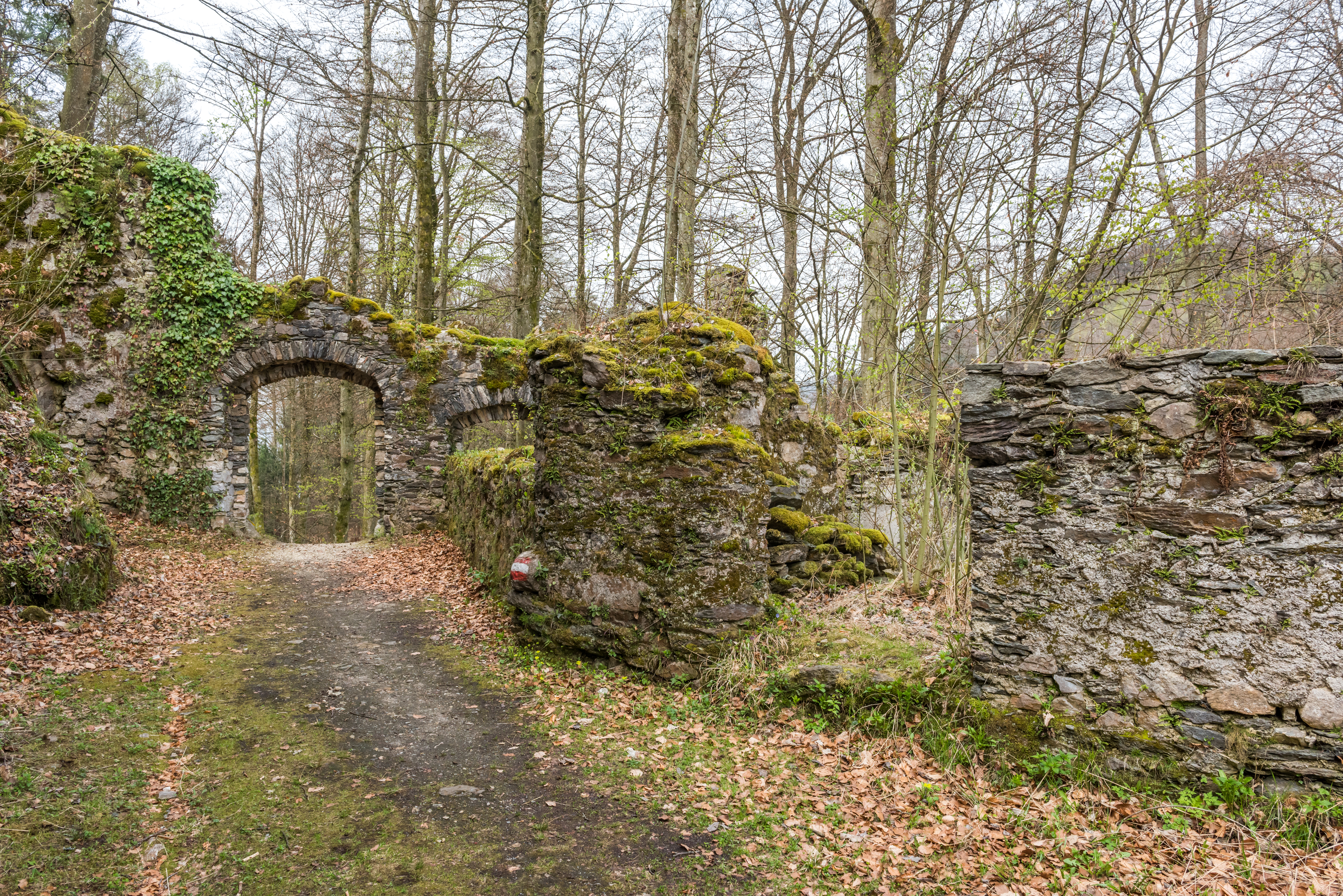

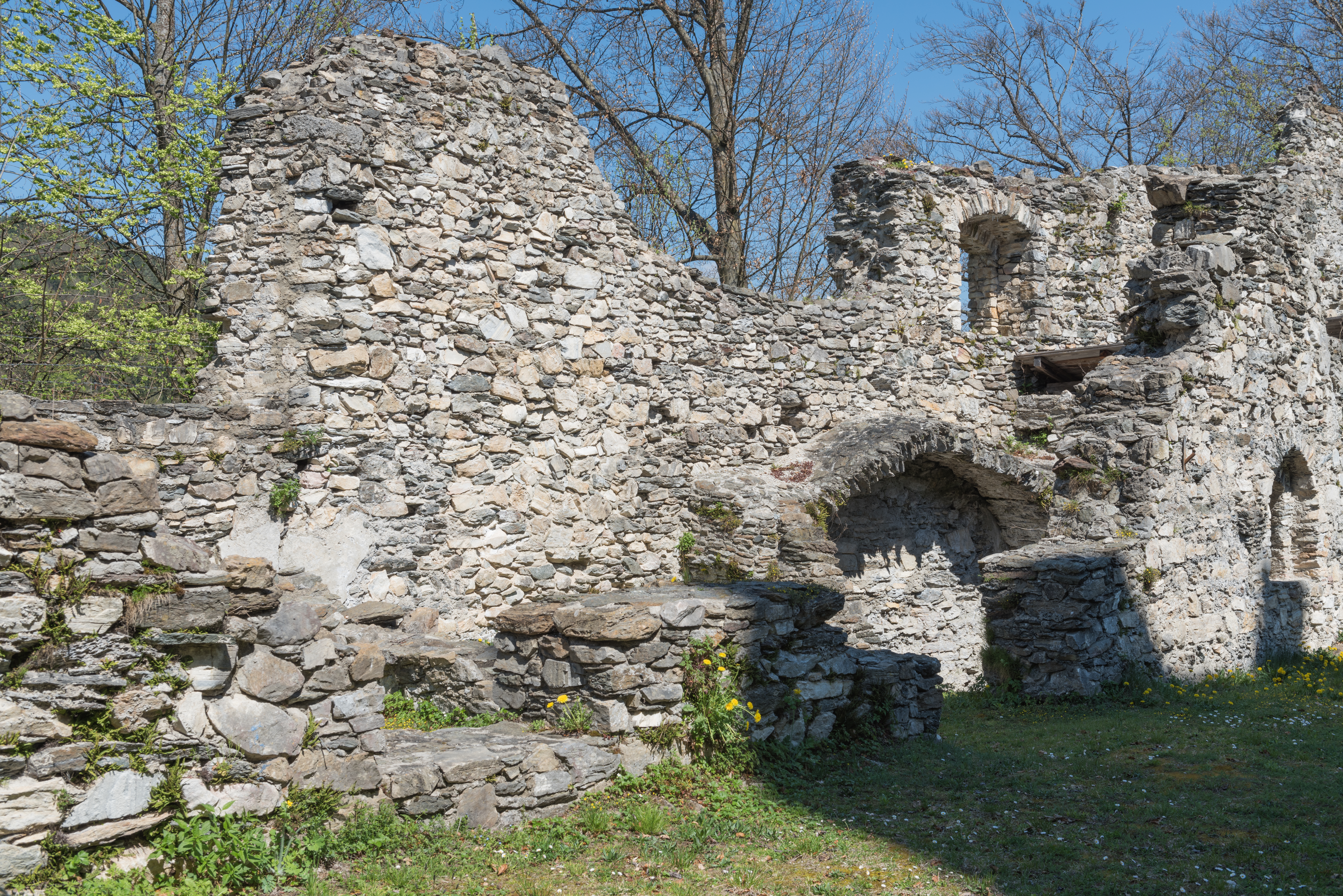

== See also ==
- List of castles in Austria
