= Burgruine Glanegg =

Castle ruins in Austria

Coordinates: 46.726°N 14.182°E

- Carinthia, Austria
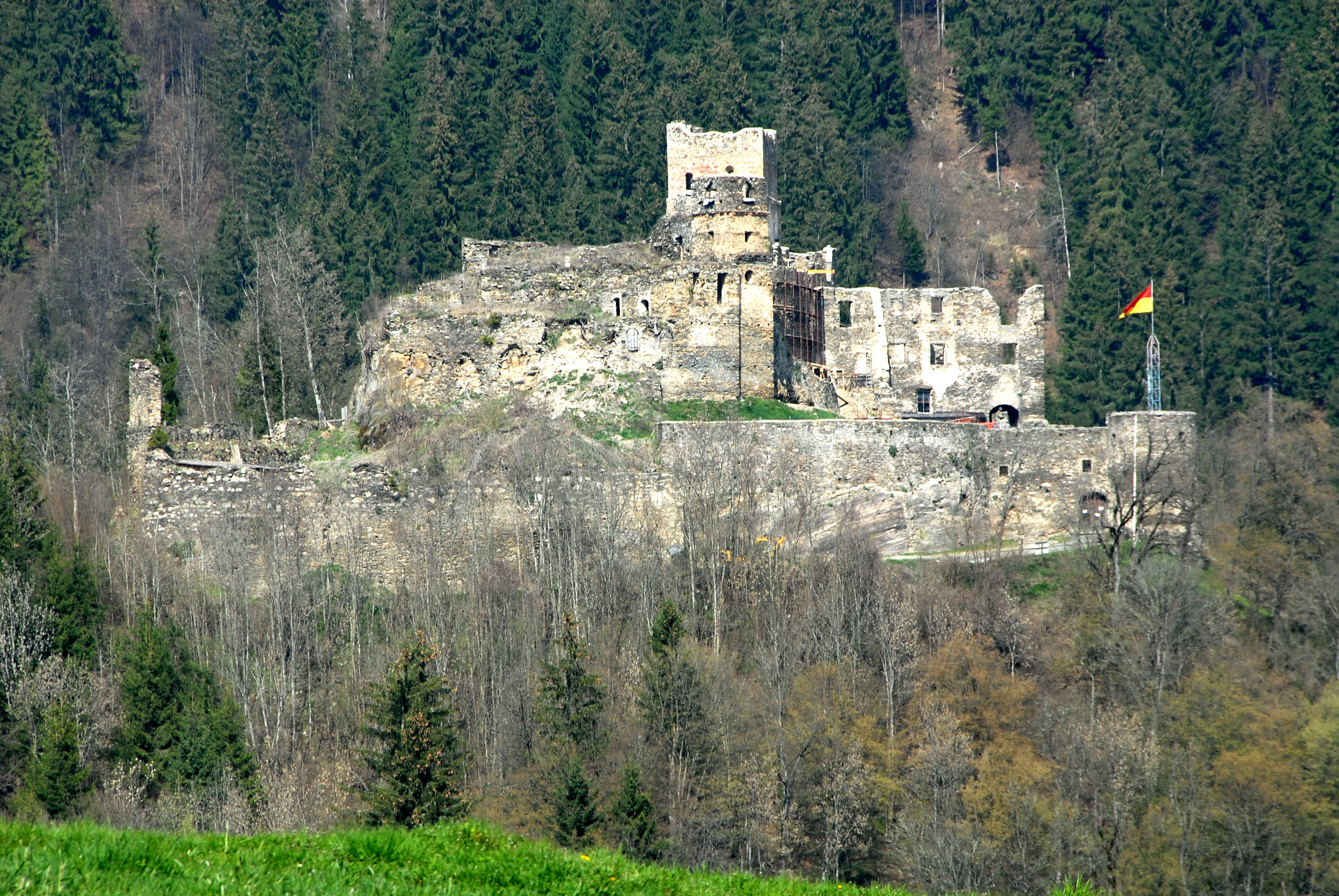

Site information
- Type: Castle

Site history
- Built: 1121 (905 years ago)

Burgruine Glanegg is a castle in Carinthia, Austria. After Hochosterwitz and Fortress Landskron, it is the third-largest military complex in Carinthia.

== History ==
The earliest known documentation of the castle was in 1121, when it was referred to as "Glenekke" and was owned by Duke Henry III of Carinthia. Upon the death of Henry in 1122, ownership transferred to his nephew, Count Bernhard von Marburg and later Otakar III. His son, Duke Ottokar IV, left the castle after he died in 1192 to Leopold V. From 1473 to 1478, the Turks threatened the castle but failed to capture it. After three more owners, in 1534, King Ferdinand I owned the castle, but he had to sell it to Ulrich von Ernau because of his debts.

In 1818, Hofrichter Hirzegger from Ossiach purchased the castle to give to his daughter Josephine as a wedding present. In 1860, the castle was sold to Bregenz Mayor Ferdinand Kinz. After three more owners, the castle Glanegg finally came to a family of Maier/Zwillink, who now own the castle.

== Construction ==
The building comprises various architectural elements, ranging from Romanticism to Renaissance. What is striking is the entrance to the round tower. The decay of the castle began in the mid-19th century.

== See also ==
- List of castles in Austria
