= Krumpendorf am Wörthersee =

- Municipality
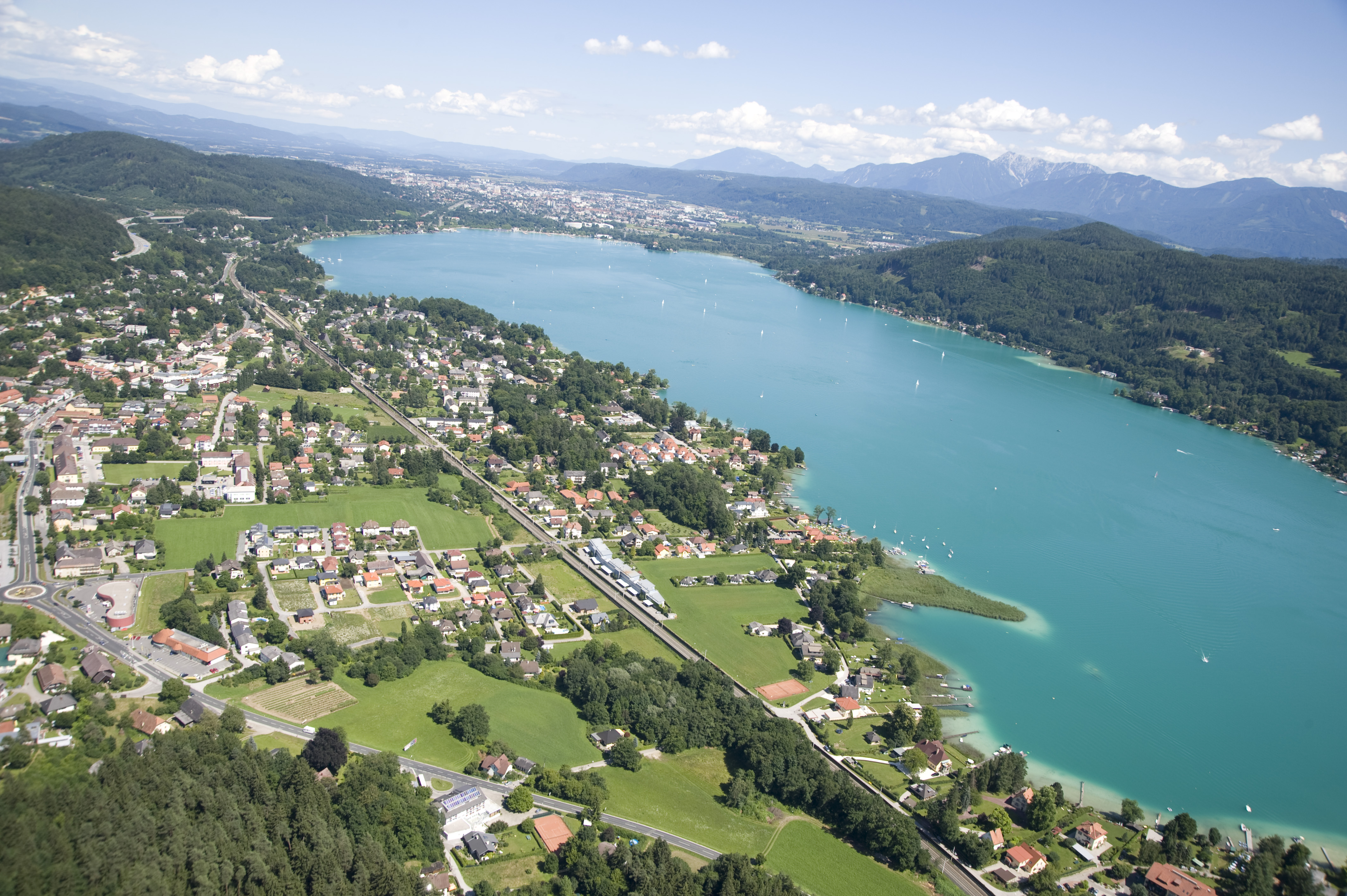
- Krumpendorf and Wörthersee

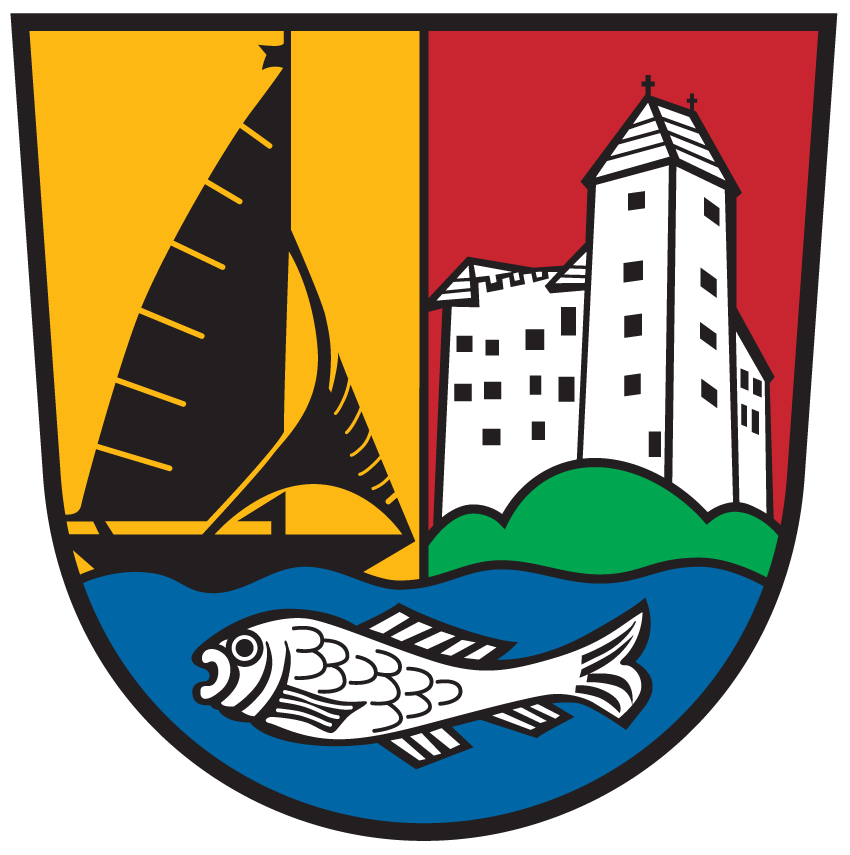
- Coat of arms

- Location within Austria
- Coordinates: 46°38′N 14°13′E
- Country: Austria
- State: Carinthia
- District: Klagenfurt-Land

Government
  - Mayor: Gernot Bürger (ÖVP)

Area
  - Total: 11.88 km^{2} (4.59 sq mi)
- Elevation: 450 m (1,480 ft)

Population (2018-01-01)
  - Total: 3,497
  - Density: 294.4/km^{2} (762.4/sq mi)
- Time zone: UTC+1 (CET)
  - Summer (DST): UTC+2 (CEST)
- Postal code: 9201
- Area code: 04229
- Website: krumpendorf.gv.at

Krumpendorf am Wörthersee (Slovene: Kriva Vrba) is a municipality in Klagenfurt-Land District, in Carinthia, Austria. It is situated on the Wörthersee.

== Geography ==
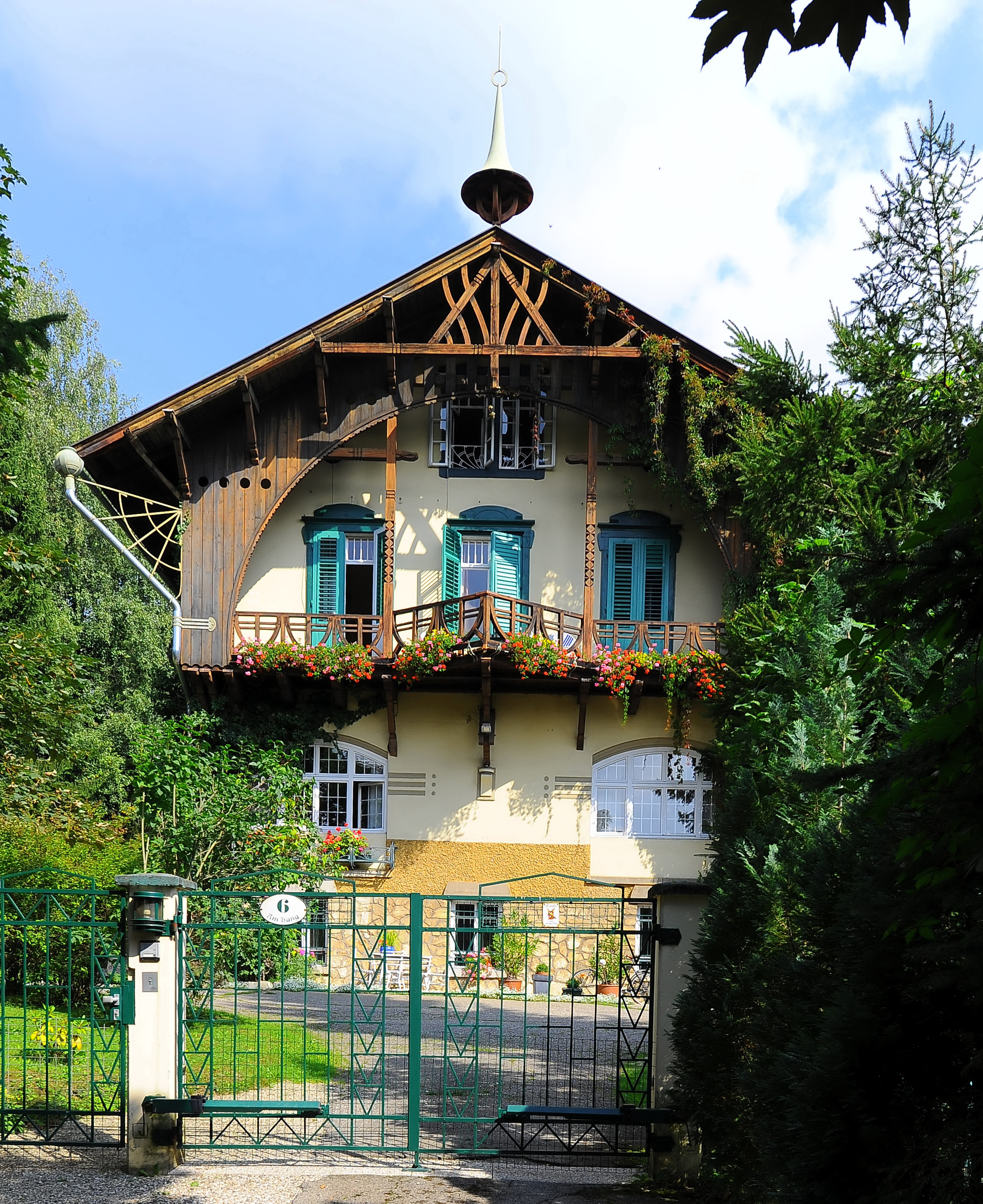
Villa Haybäck

Krumpendorf stretches along the northern shore of Wörthersee, Carinthia's largest bathing lake. The municipal area with 11.86 km^{2} (4.58 mi^{2}) is the smallest of all Carinthian municipalities. In the east, it borders on the state capital Klagenfurt. Krumpendorf can be reached via two junctions of the Süd Autobahn (A2) from Vienna to Villach and the border with Italy.

Krumpendorf also has a train station, where connections can be made to S-Bahn Kärnten and Railjet services running between Klagenfurt, Villach, Lienz, Vienna, and Italy.

The municipal area comprises the cadastral communities of Pritschitz (Pričiče), Krumpendorf, Drasing und Gurlitsch II.

== History ==
The original name Chrumpendorf was probably derived from the local denotation krumpe Felfer (Slovene: vrba), i.e. "crooked willow". Drasing Castle, located on a northern hillside, was first mentioned 1284, it may have been the site of an outer ward of the nearby Moosburg (Arnulf Castle) Kaiserpfalz. Once a rural area, its picturesque setting nowadays makes Krumpendorf a popular destination for daytrippers and tourist resort. Beside the Baroque Krumpendorf Castle finished in 1740, the overall appearance of the locality features several lavish hotels and mansions built in the typical fin-de-siècle 'Wörthersee Style'.

The name affix am Wörther See was added by resolution of the local government in 1987, modified am Wörthersee in 2012.

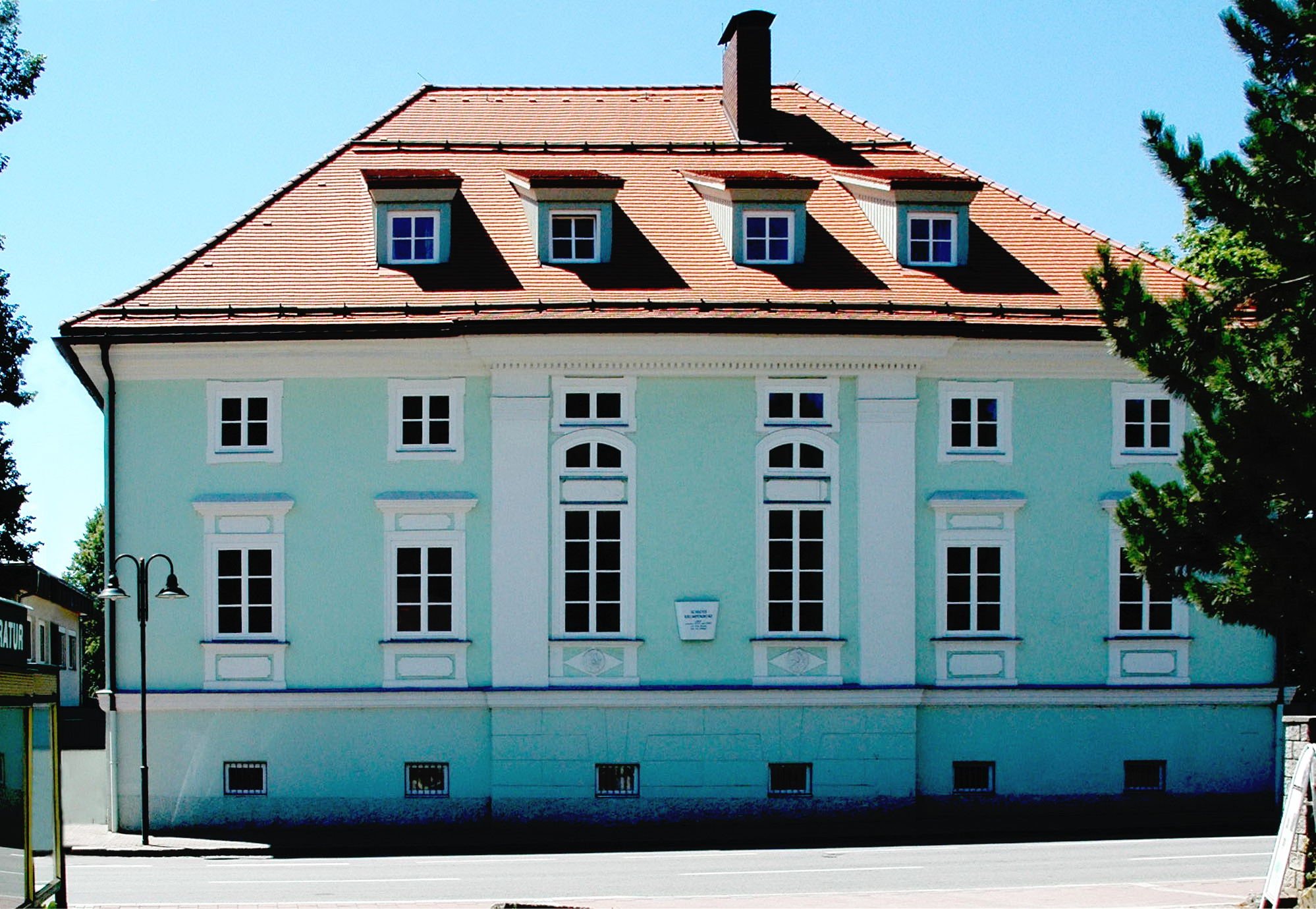
Krumpendorf Castle

== Population ==
Krumpendorf has a population of 3,453 people. 52.4% are women and 47.6% are men. The average age of the population is 46.

94.0% of the population have Austrian citizenship; of the foreign nationalities, residents from Germany (1.8%) and Bosnia-Herzegovina (1.0%) have the largest share. 94.3% of the citizens stated German as a colloquial language. The second largest language group is Croatian (1.6%), followed by Slovenian (1.1%).

70.8% of the citizens profess to the Roman Catholic Church and 10.2% to the Protestant Church. 0.8% are Muslims and 13.4% have no religious beliefs.

Due to the steadily growing population, Krumpendorf can be described as an immigration community.

== Politics ==
Seats in the municipal assembly (Gemeinderat) as of 2015 elections:

- Austrian People's Party (ÖVP): 9
- Social Democratic Party of Austria (SPÖ): 7
- The Greens – The Green Alternative: 4
- Freedom Party in Carinthia (FPÖ): 2
- NEOS – The New Austria (NEOS): 1

== Culture ==
=== Theatre ===
The theater group KULT was founded in 2002 and is a cultural association based in Krumpendorf, which is dedicated to acting. Performances usually take place in April in the Krumpendorfer community hall.

=== Kultursommer Krumpendorf ===
The Kultursommer Krumpendorf is a series of events of various activities that take place every year from the end of June to the end of August. They mainly include concerts and readings, but also film evenings, poetry slams and other things. The events take place in the forest arena at the lake promenade (Seepromenade) in Krumpendorf.

=== Recurring events ===
Summer market The summer market takes place every Friday afternoon and evening next to the municipal office in Krumpendorf. The focus is on organic products, culinary offerings and the sale of handicrafts.

May Festival The May Festival is an annual event at the beginning of May which includes a parade and the traditional Maypole erection.

Oktoberfest The Oktoberfest is an annual, multi-day event, which is held in mid-September on the community meadow next to the municipal office.

Harbor Festival The harbor festival is an annual event in summer (July), which takes place in and around the lake promenade in Krumpendorf.

Ironman Austria Ironman Austria has been an annual triathlon sporting event over the Ironman distance (3.86 km swimming, 180.2 km cycling and 42.195 km running) in Klagenfurt, Austria, in Carinthia, which has been held annually since 1998. The route (cycling and running) leads through Krumpendorf.

Namaste am See Namaste am See is a yoga festival (takes place every year at Whitsun) and a series of regular yoga events (during the summer months) that take place around the Wörthersee. Krumpendorf is one of the venues, events usually take place in the Parkbad.

== Recreation ==
=== Kropfitschbad ===
Private beach with a large, sunny lawn, cabins, bathing jetty, sandpit, swimming island and marina. There is also a restaurant with a beach bar on the premises, serving food and drinks.

=== Parkbad Krumpendorf ===
The approx. 2 hectare beach known as Parkbad Krumpendorf has various facilities for a family-friendly and varied bathing day. In addition to relaxation areas, playgrounds, swimming areas in the lake, table tennis facilities, a water trampoline, and a water volleyball court, there is a restaurant with a cafe and an ice cream parlor.

=== Seepromenade Krumpendorf & Waldarena ===
Generously laid out park directly on the lake with a ship landing dock, children's playground, marina and volleyball court. The forest arena is an open air event location with approx. 100 seats where, among other things, the Krumpendorfer Kultursommer takes place.

=== Bad Stich ===
Private beach with restaurant and apartment rental, which been run as a family business since 1910.

=== Wasserweg Krumpendorf ===
The waterway leads along the Pirkerbach up to the Pirkerkogel. The entrance can be found along the Moosburger Hauptstrasse, immediately after the elementary school on the left side of the Hauptstrasse.

=== Children's playgrounds ===
Krumpendorf has 4 different playgrounds, listed below.

Playgrounds in Krumpedorf
- Thomas-Koschat-Park
- Parkbad Krumpendorf
- Lake Promenade
- BUWOG-Wiese (Südbahnweg)
