= Gurk (river) =

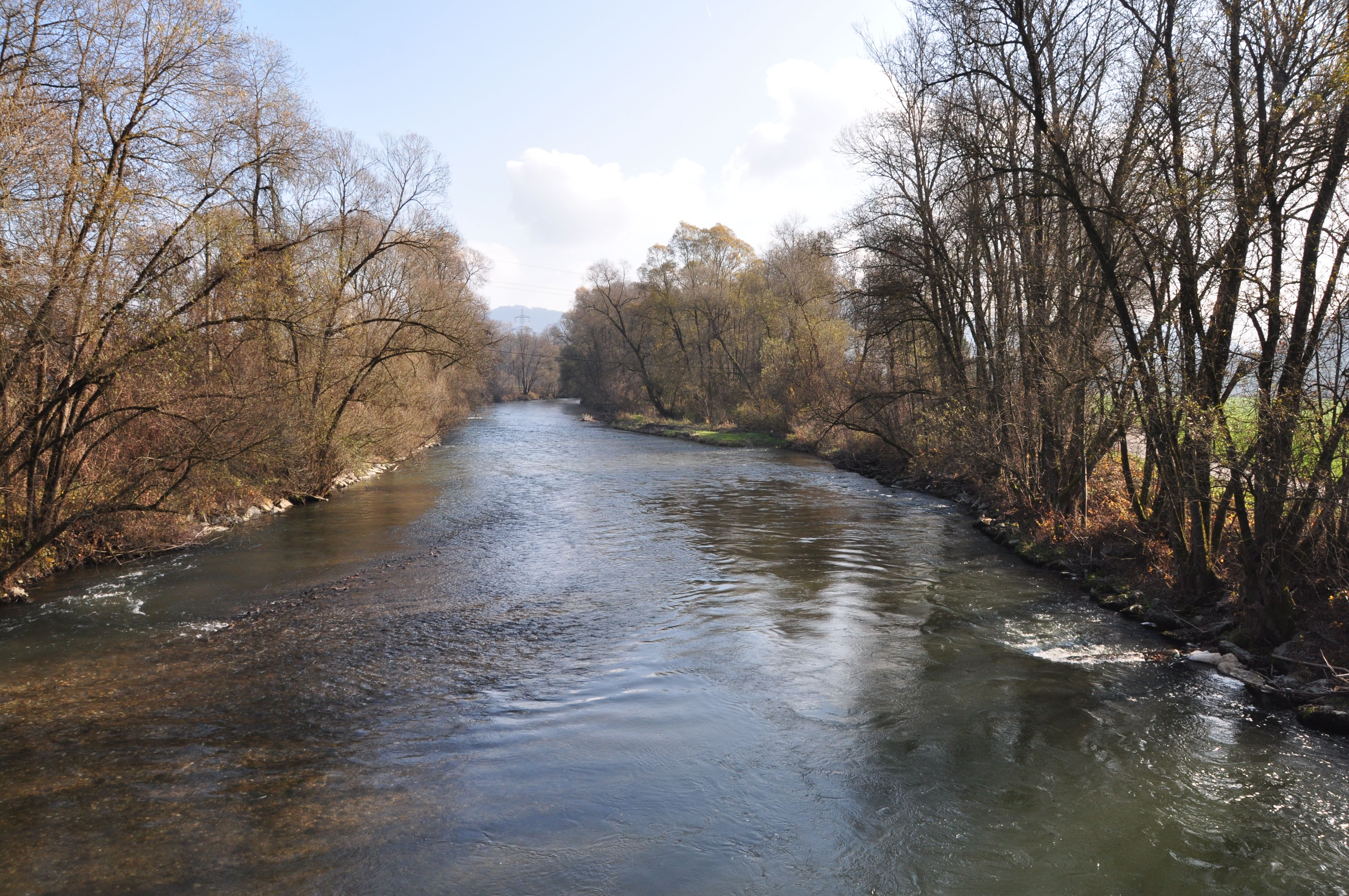
- Gurk River near Grafenstein

Location
- Country: Austria
- State: Carinthia

Physical characteristics
- Source
  - location: Gurksee and Torersee, Albeck
  - elevation: 1,970 m (6,460 ft) (Gurksee); 2,010 m (6,590 ft) (Torersee)
- Mouth
  - location: Drava near Völkermarkt
  - coordinates: 46°36′35″N 14°31′36″E
- Length: 155.6 km (96.7 mi)
- Basin size: 2,585.1 km^{2} (998.1 sq mi)

Basin features
- Progression: Drava→ Danube→ Black Sea

The Gurk (German pronunciation: [ɡʊʁk]; Slovene: Krka) is a river in the Austrian state of Carinthia, a left tributary of the Drava. With a length of 156 km (97 mi) it is the longest river that flows entirely within Carinthia. Its drainage basin is 2,585.1 km^{2} (998.1 sq mi), which covers about 27% of the state's territory.

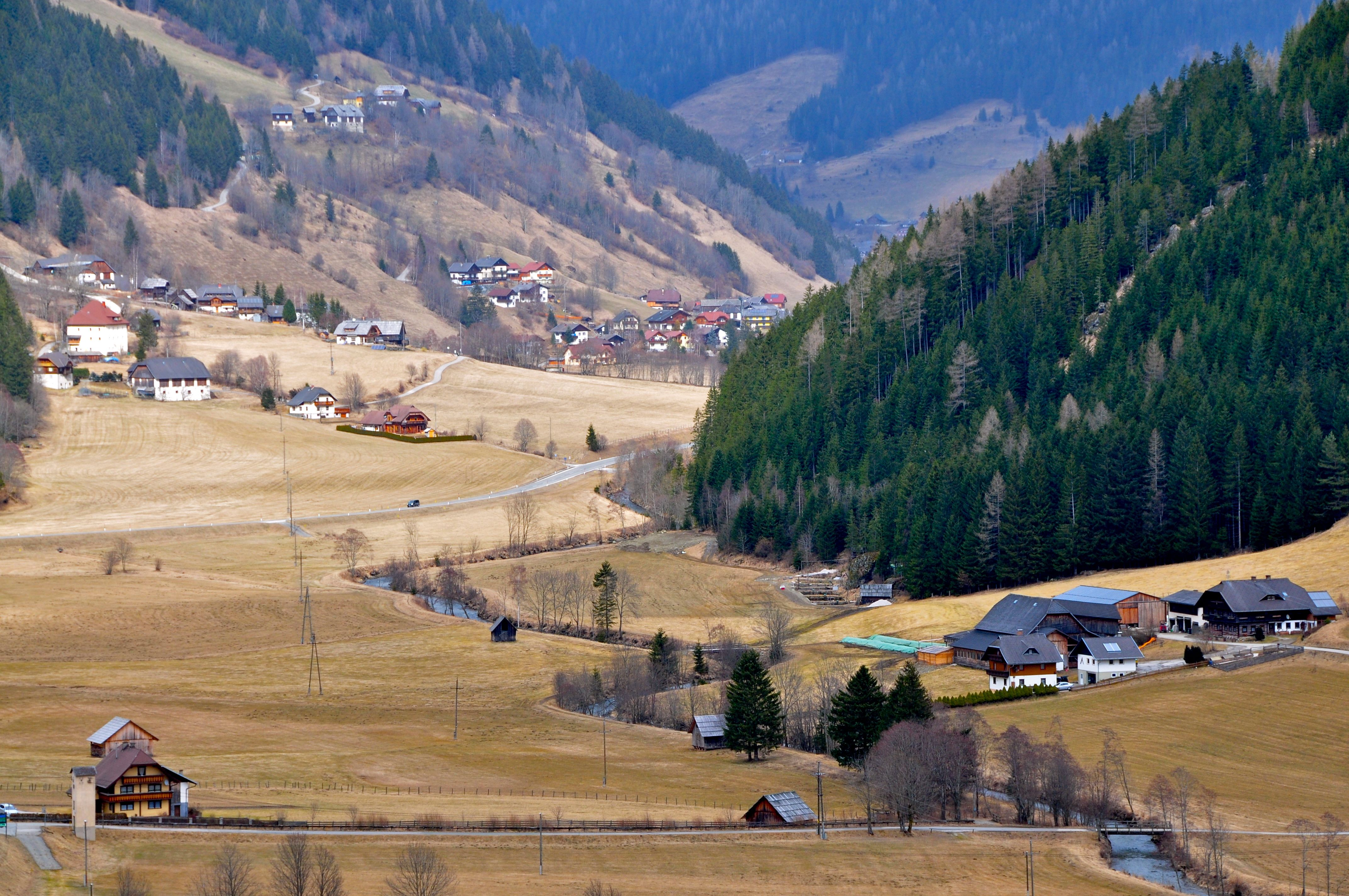
Gurktal near Reichenau

The Gurk rises in the Nock Mountains (Gurktal Alps) of the Central Eastern Alps, near the border with the Austrian state of Styria. Its sources are two small cirque lakes, the Gurksee and the Torersee near Albeck and the Turracher Höhe Pass, a protected area since 1981. The Gurksee has an elevation of 1,970 m (6,460 ft), an area of 4,000 m^{2} (43,000 sq ft), and is 1.5 m (4.9 ft) deep; the Torersee lies 2,010 m (6,590 ft) above sea level, has an area of 3,500 m^{2} (38,000 sq ft), and is 1.2 m (3.9 ft) deep. Since both lake are frozen in the winter, they contain no fish.

It flows southwest to Ebene Reichenau and then turns eastwards running through Gnesau and the Gurktal valley to the market town of Gurk. Near Straßburg it again turns to the south, enters the Klagenfurt basin, and flows into the Drava west of Völkermarkt.

Its tributaries include the Görtschitz, the Metnitz (left), and the Glan (right).
