= Techelsberg am Wörther See =

- Municipality
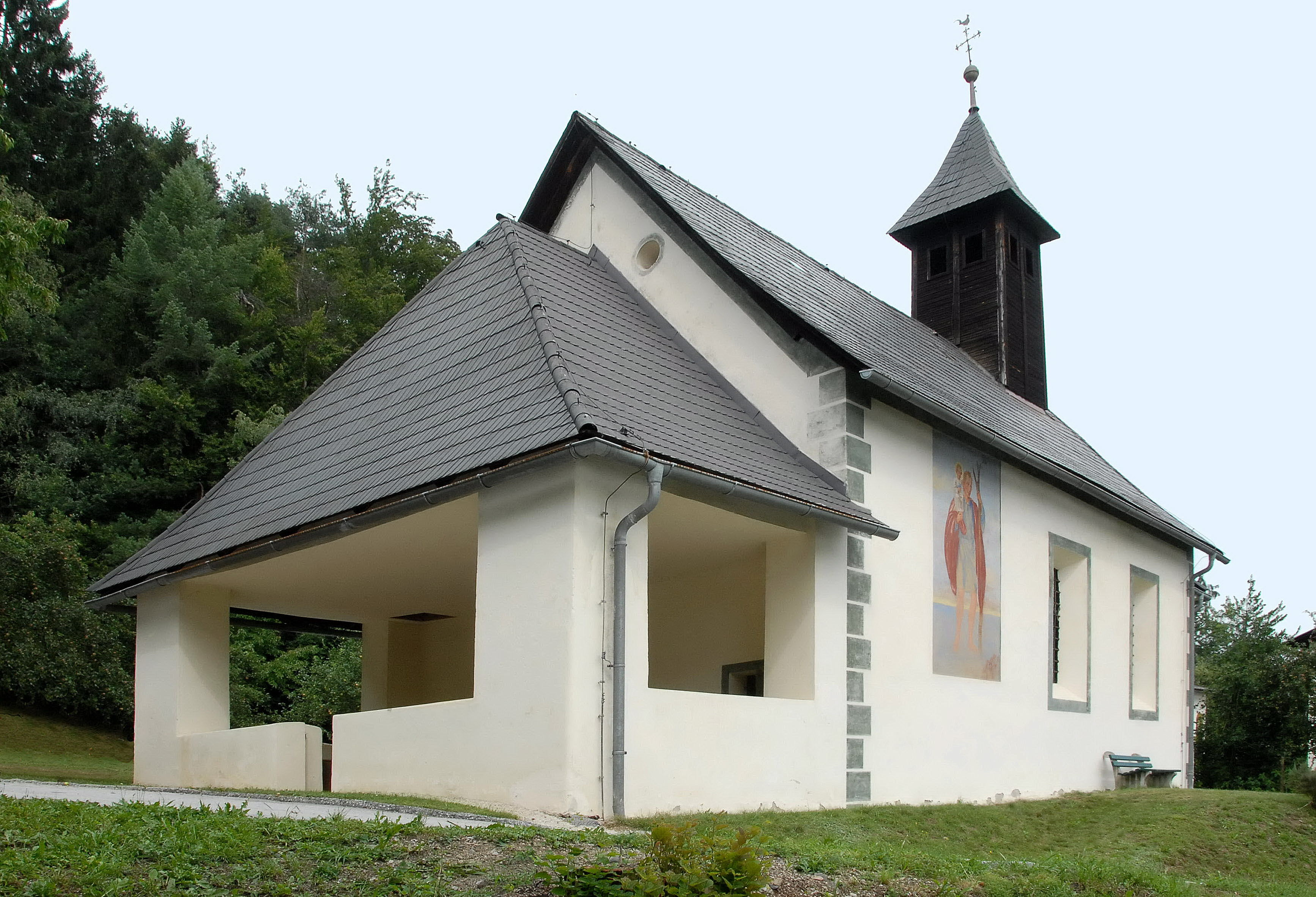

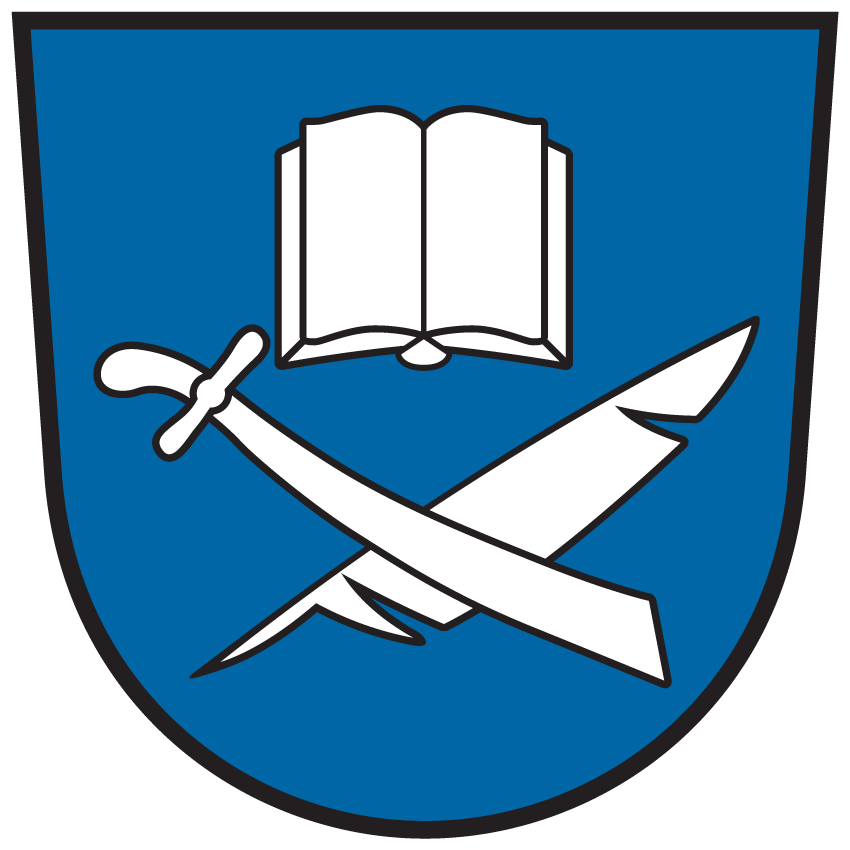
- Coat of arms

- Location within Austria
- Coordinates: 46°40′N 14°6′E
- Country: Austria
- State: Carinthia
- District: Klagenfurt-Land

Government
  - Mayor: Johann Koban

Area
  - Total: 28.33 km^{2} (10.94 sq mi)
- Elevation: 685 m (2,247 ft)

Population (2018-01-01)
  - Total: 2,203
  - Density: 77.76/km^{2} (201.4/sq mi)
- Time zone: UTC+1 (CET)
  - Summer (DST): UTC+2 (CEST)
- Postal code: 9212
- Area code: +43 4272

Techelsberg am Wörther See (Slovene: Teholica) is a municipality in the district of Klagenfurt-Land in the Austrian state of Carinthia.

== Geography ==
Techelsberg reaches from the southern edge of the Ossiacher Tauern to the northern shore of Lake Wörth.
