= Savnik =

Savnik may refer to:

- Šavnik, a town in Montenegro
- Šavnik (river), a short river flowing through the town of Šavnik
- Savnik (surname)
