= Kranj =

- City
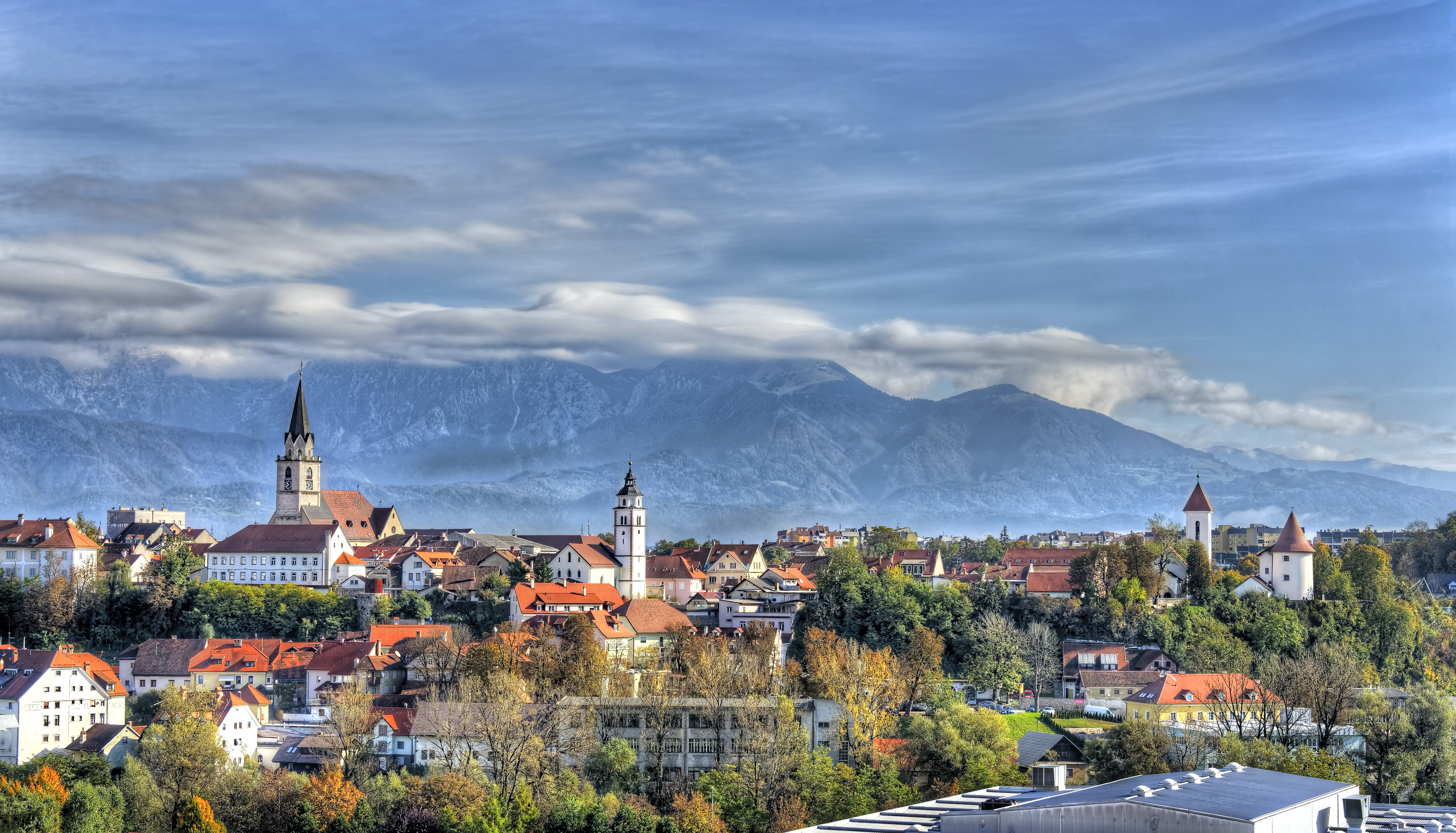
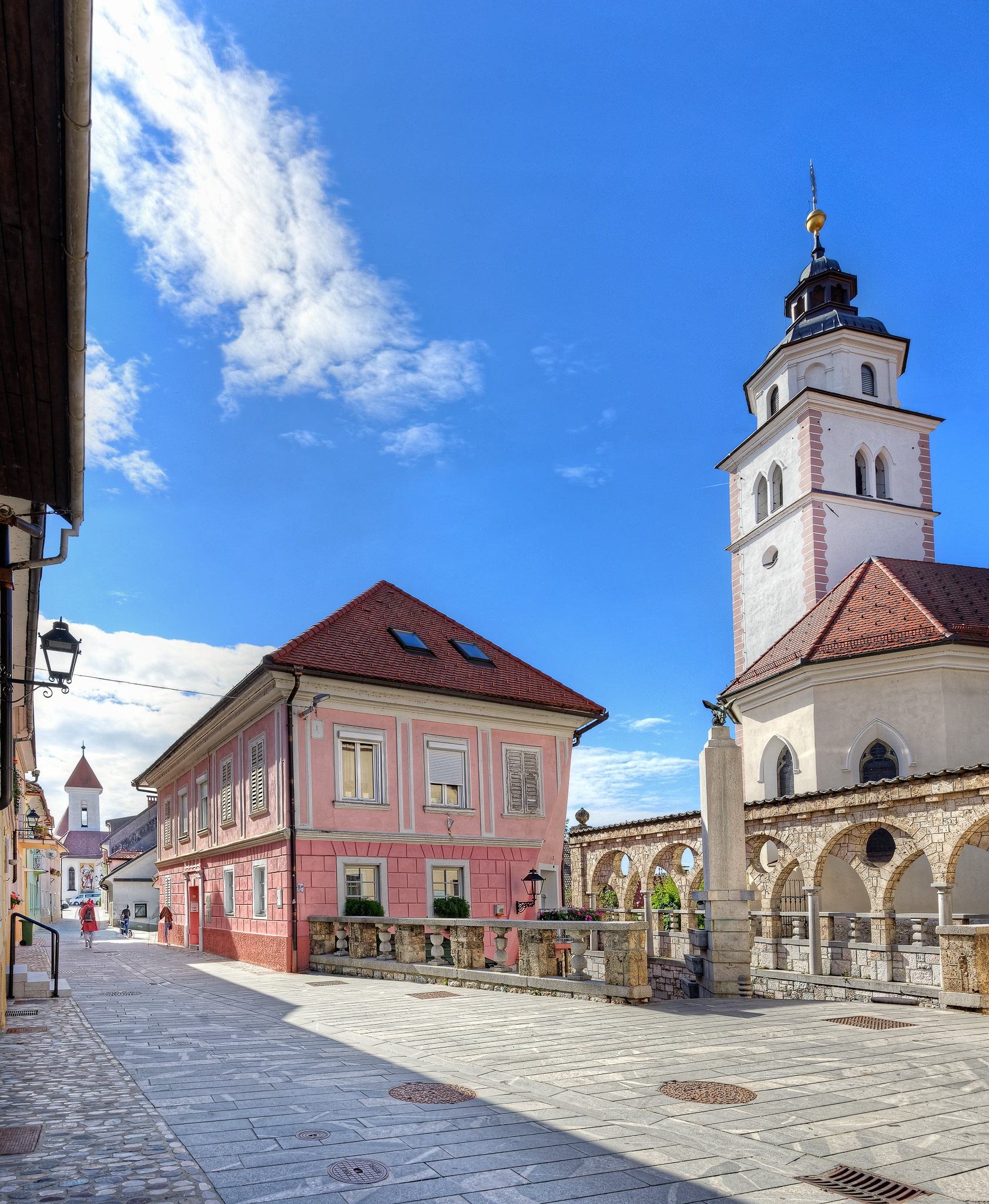
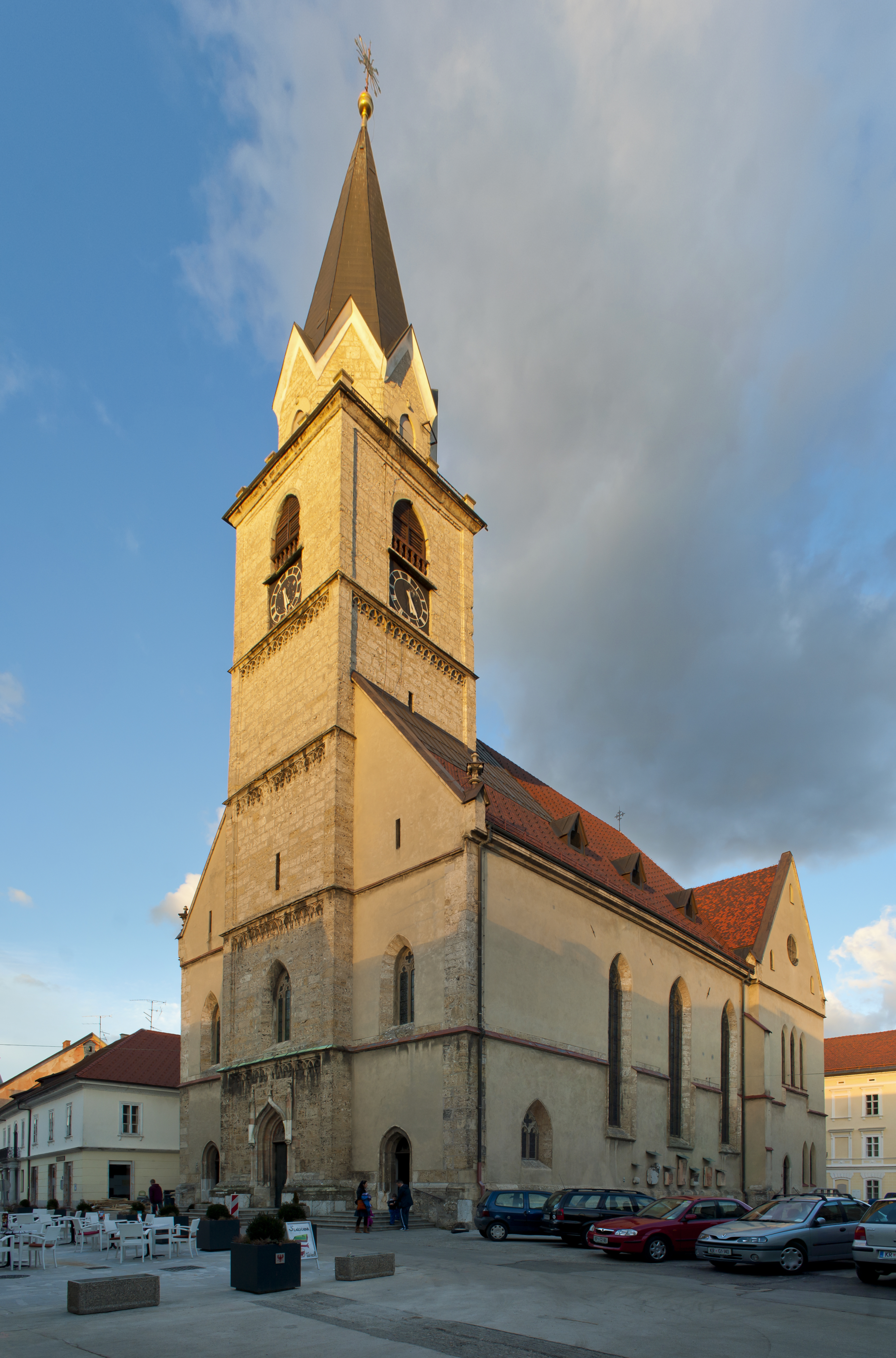
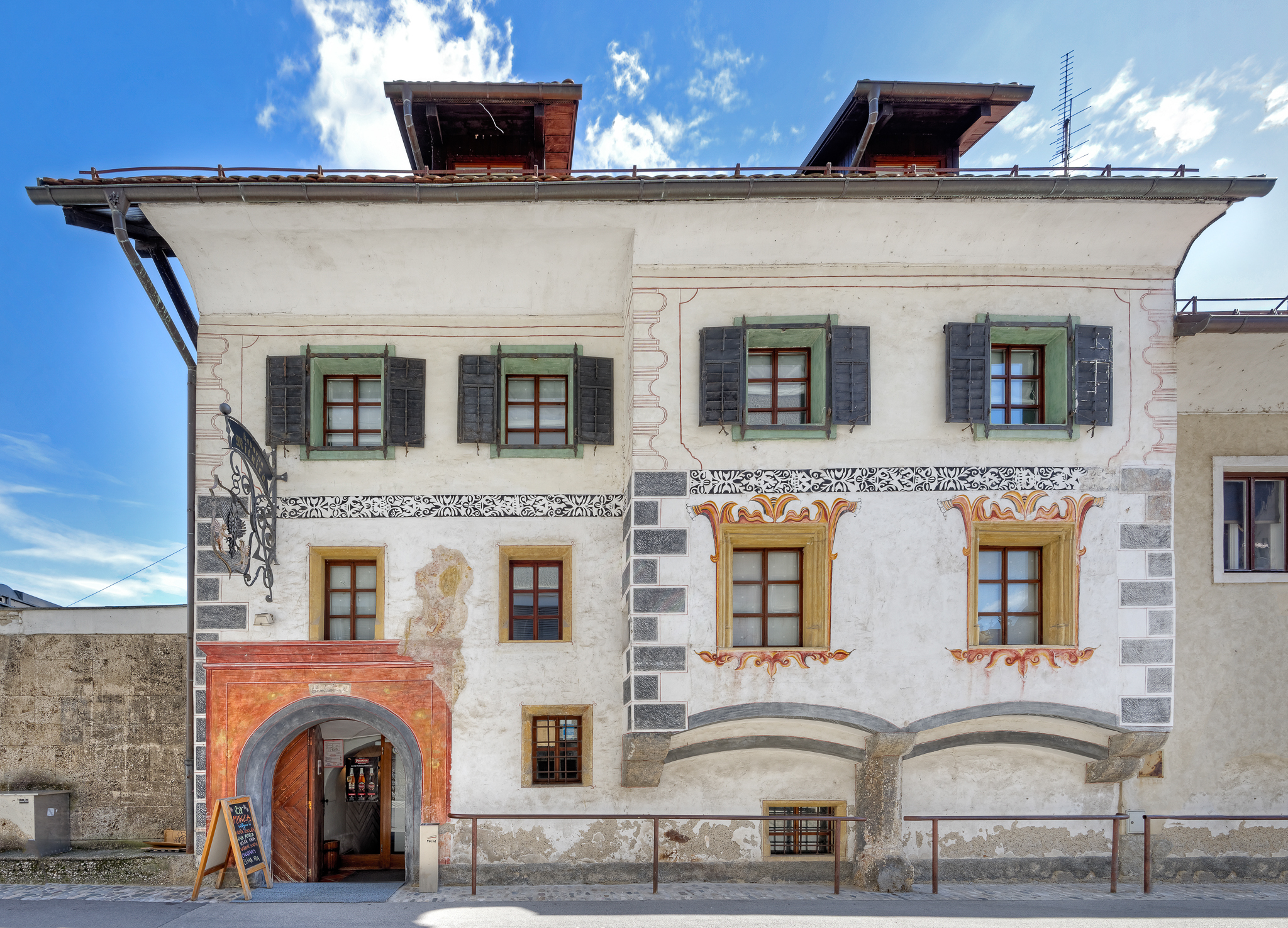
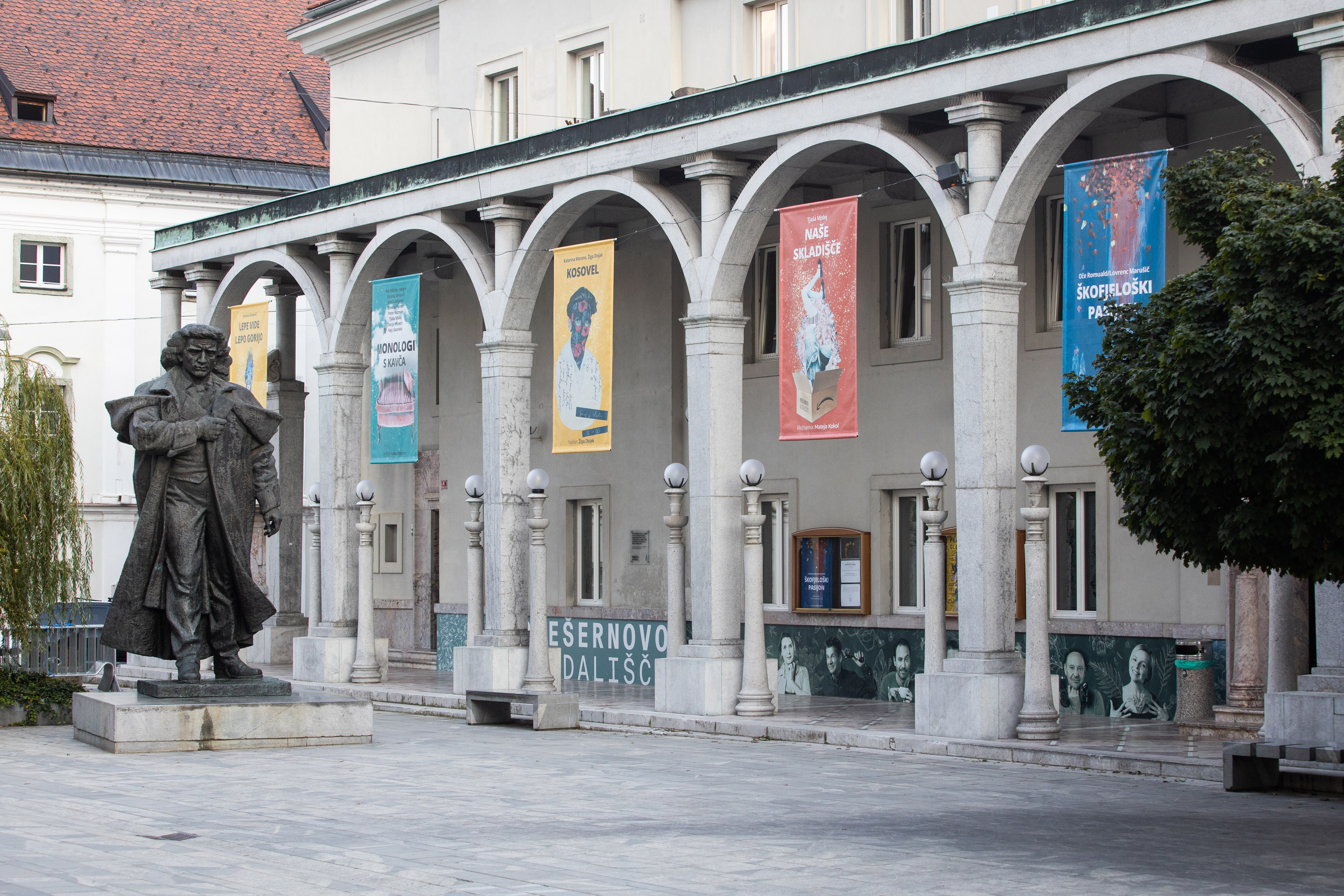
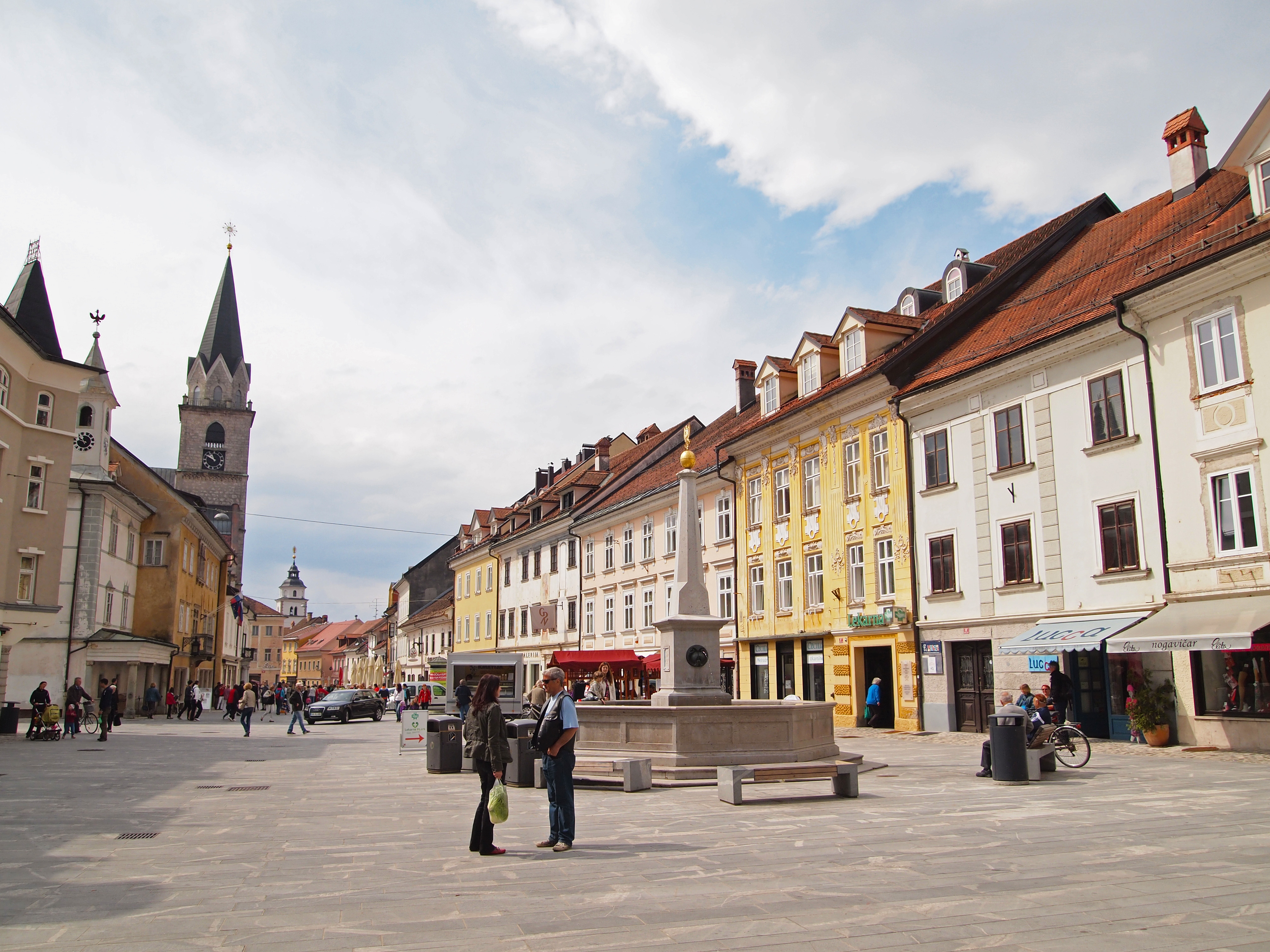
- Town skyline Plečnik's arcades Kranj Cathedral Mitničar house Prešeren Theater Main Square

- Flag Coat of arms

- Location in Slovenia
- Coordinates: 46°14′N 14°22′E
- Country: Slovenia
- Traditional region: Upper Carniola
- Statistical region: Upper Carniola
- Municipality: Kranj

Government
  - Mayor: Matjaž Rakovec (SD)

Area
  - Total: 26.3 km^{2} (10.2 sq mi)
- Elevation: 386 m (1,266 ft)

Population (2025)
  - Total: 37,966
  - Municipality: 57,384
- Time zone: UTC+01
  - Summer (DST): UTC+02 (CEST)
- Postal code: 4000
- Area code: 04
- Vehicle registration: KR
- Website: www.kranj.si

Kranj (pronounced [ˈkɾàːn], German: Krainburg) is the fourth-largest city in Slovenia and the largest urban center of the traditional region of Upper Carniola (northwestern Slovenia) and the Slovene Alps. It is located approximately 20 kilometres (12 miles) northwest of the national capital Ljubljana, acting as the seat of the City Municipality of Kranj.

== Geography ==
The nucleus of the city is a well-preserved medieval old town, built at the confluence of the Kokra and Sava rivers. The city is served by the Kranj railway station on the route from Ljubljana to Munich, Germany (via Jesenice and Villach, Austria) and a highway. Slovenia's national airport, Ljubljana Jože Pučnik Airport (in Brnik) is also very close to Kranj, considerably more so than to its nominal client, Ljubljana.

In Kranj, the Kokra cuts deeply into the conglomerate, forming a canyon 40 meters (130 ft) deep. Kosorep, on the northern outskirts of Kranj, is a picturesque site along the river. Parts of the canyon can be reached by a walking trail. Below Kranj, at Drulovka, the Sava forms a 40-meter (130 ft) deep canyon with conglomerate on both sides. Due to the dam for the Mavčiče Hydroelectric Plant, the river's flow there is very slow.

=== Climate ===
Kranj has a warm-summer humid continental climate (Köppen climate classification Dfb).

Climate data for Kranj
| Month | Jan | Feb | Mar | Apr | May | Jun | Jul | Aug | Sep | Oct | Nov | Dec | Year |
|---|---|---|---|---|---|---|---|---|---|---|---|---|---|
| Daily mean °C (°F) | −0.8 (30.6) | 1.4 (34.5) | 5.3 (41.5) | 10.0 (50.0) | 14.9 (58.8) | 18.3 (64.9) | 19.7 (67.5) | 19.0 (66.2) | 14.4 (57.9) | 10.5 (50.9) | 5.8 (42.4) | 0.5 (32.9) | 9.9 (49.8) |
| Average precipitation mm (inches) | 80 (3.1) | 78 (3.1) | 116 (4.6) | 108 (4.3) | 106 (4.2) | 121 (4.8) | 131 (5.2) | 153 (6.0) | 154 (6.1) | 137 (5.4) | 162 (6.4) | 149 (5.9) | 1,493 (58.8) |
Source: Slovenian Environment Agency (ARSO) (data for 2000-2010;temperature data:Preddvor)

== Etymology ==
Kranj was attested in written sources in the 5th century and c. 670 as Carnium (and as via Chreinariorum in 973, actum Kreine in 1050–65, in loco Chreina in 1065–77, and Chrainburch in 1291). The Slovene name is derived from Slavic *Korn'ь, borrowed from Romance Carnium in late antiquity. Like the Latin regional name Carnia, it is derived from the Celtic tribe known as the Carnī (Greek: Κάρνοι). The name of the tribe is probably derived from the Celtic root *karno- 'peak, hill, pile of stones'. The German name of the town was Krainburg. The name of the historical region of Carniola is a Latin diminutive form of Carnia.

== History ==
=== Prehistory and antiquity ===
Archaeological finds show that Kranj was settled in prehistoric times. Discoveries include a bronze ax found in Drulovka, Hallstatt-era graves in the northern part of the town above the bank of the Kokra River, testifying to Illyrian settlement, and a burial site in the southern part of the town above the left bank of the Sava River, indicating a Celtic settlement. The Romans founded the settlement of Carnium at the confluence of the Sava and Kokra. In the 6th century, a major Germanic settlement stood at the same site, and an Ostrogothic cemetery was discovered nearby. The Gothic settlement was continued by the Lombards and existed until c. AD 580, when it was destroyed by invading Slavs.

=== Middle Ages ===
Traces of the old Slavic settlement (a Slavic burial site) date from the 9th and 10th centuries. As the seat of the margraves of Carniola in the 11th century, it was the most important settlement in the territory. The town itself is believed to have developed in the early 13th century; citizens of the town of Kranj appear in a document from 1221, and Kranj was officially referred to as a town in 1256. It was the seat of a court whose jurisdiction extended between that of Radovljica and Kamnik. In 1414 a decision was issued relieving the citizens of the town from paying tolls. In 1422 an ordinance required houses to be built of stone to prevent fires. A parish school was established in Kranj in 1423, and the same year the right was granted to Kranj to elect its own judge. Kranj was laid waste in 1471 in an Ottoman attack. Emperor Frederick III granted Kranj the right to collect tolls in documents from 1488 and 1493, and a 1493 document also granted the town the right to hold fairs twice a year. The town hospice records date back to the 15th century.

Crafts developed in Kranj during the Middle Ages. Mills first developed along the Sava and Kokra rivers, and this was followed by butchers, fur merchants, hide and wood processors, and then weavers of canvas and woolen cloth. Habsburg efforts to maintain Vienna's monopoly on trade with Italy resulted in trade routes bypassing Kranj.

=== Renaissance ===
Kranj was affected by peasant revolts in the 16th century; the leaders of the 1515 peasant revolt were beheaded in Kranj, and in 1525, when a new revolt threatened Carniola, hussars commanded by Johann Katzianer occupied the town and caused more damage than the Ottomans had inflicted half a century earlier. In 1668 half of the houses in Kranj were destroyed by a fire, and the entire town burned in 1749. Kranj was affected by plague outbreaks in 1552, 1557, 1625, 1627, and 1657. In the mid-16th century, most of the townspeople converted to Protestantism; the merchants of Kranj opened a Protestant school and Slovenian books by Protestant authors were imported from Germany. The Protestant Reformation in Kranj was led by Gašpar Rokavec, who was succeeded by Jernej Knafel after his death. Knafel was forced to withdraw from Kranj to Brdo Castle during the Counter-Reformation.

Economically, teamster services developed in Kranj in the 16th century, with connections to the rest of Upper Carniola and Carinthia. There were also several blacksmith workshops and two foundries along the Sava River. Sieve-making also developed at this time; horsehair was imported from around Europe and the sieves were exported to France, Belgium, Germany, and Greece. Several breweries and leather works operated in the town. Kranj went into an economic decline in the 17th century, when there was much emigration from the town, leaving many houses empty, and business did not revive again until the second half of the 18th century.

=== Modern era ===
Veduta of Kranj by Anton Hayne, 1st half of 19th c., National Museum of Slovenia

Kranj was affected by plague outbreaks in 1836 and 1855. A Slovene reading room was established in 1863. Artisans' workshops became established in Kranj in the 19th century, with roots going back to a number of painters in the 17th and 18th centuries. Prominent among these was the workshop of Josip Egartner Jr. (1833–1905), who settled in Kranj in 1875. An upper secondary school was established in 1861, and a vocational school for textile workers opened in 1930. A water supply system was installed in Kranj in 1901, supplied by Čemšenik Spring on the Kokra River.

There was limited industry in Kranj until the late 19th century. Until this time, trade in agricultural products, livestock, and wood was economically most important. The Majdič Mill, which operated from 1874 until the Second World War, was an early industry, producing up to 70,000 kg (154,324 lb) of milled products per day. A leather factory was established in 1875. Large-scale industrialization occurred after the First World War, starting with the founding of a rubber factory in 1921. The Jugo-Češka textile works was established in 1923. Additional textile works were established after this, making Kranj one of the most important centers of textile manufacturing in pre-war Yugoslavia. A major strike by textile workers occurred in 1936, when they occupied the factories. Two shoe factories were established in 1925, and a bakery in 1937.

=== Second World War ===
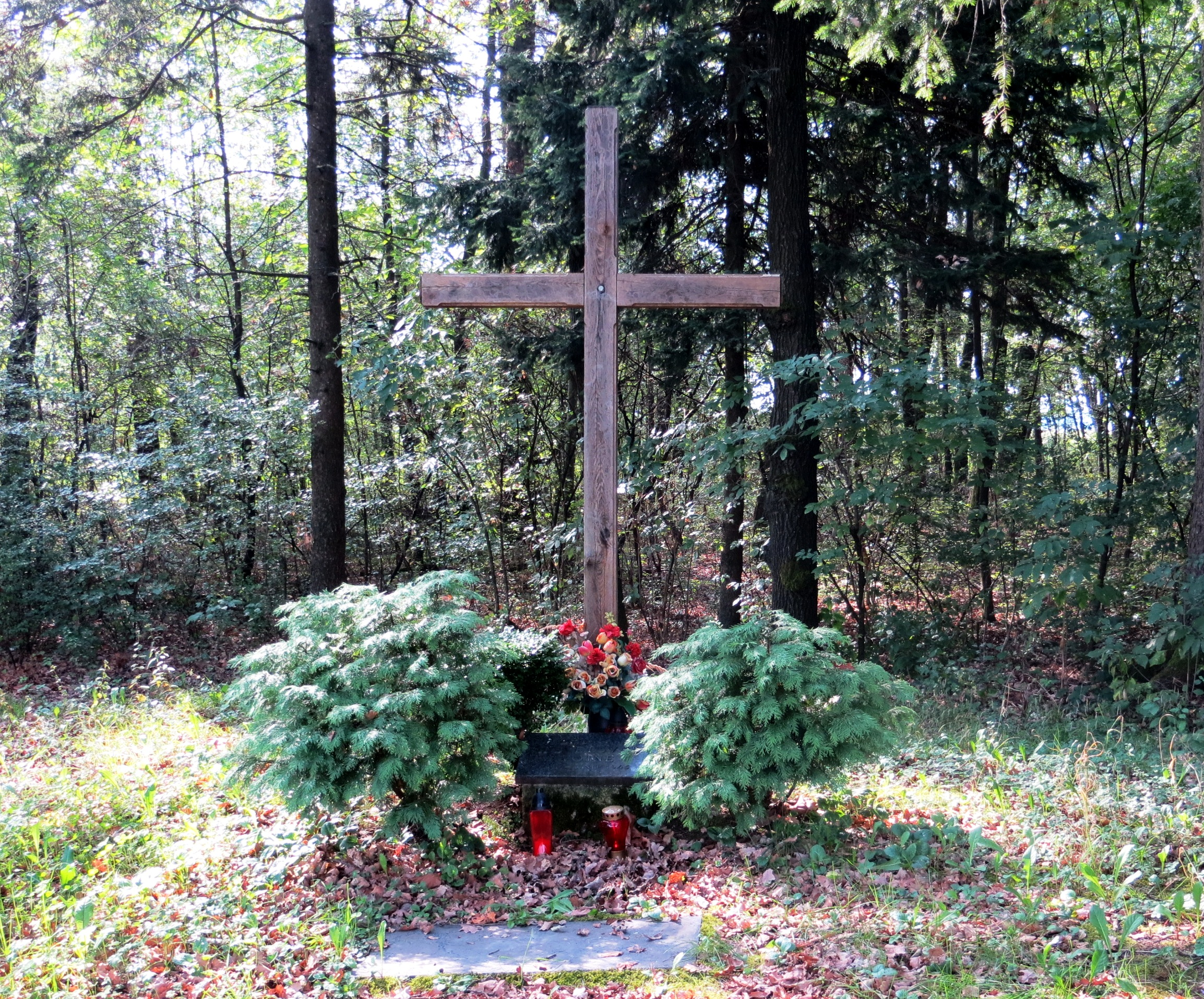
Planina Mass Grave

During the Second World War, Kranj, along with the rest of northern Slovenia, was annexed by Nazi Germany. The German authorities dismantled the Jugo-Češka textile works, replacing the machinery with equipment to produce aircraft. On 21 March 1944, German forces discovered several communist activists and functionaries at the Šorli Mill in Rupa in the northern part of the town, where military supplies for the Partisans were being stored. Three of the men at the mill were killed and the German forces then burned the mill.

==== Mass grave ====
Kranj is the site of a mass grave from the period immediately after the Second World War. The Planina Mass Grave (Slovene: Grobišče Planina) is located in a small woods in a field near the city cemetery. It contains the remains of an undetermined number of people murdered after the war; the victims may be German prisoners of war, Home Guard soldiers repatriated from Austria, or Slovene civilians from Kranj and the surrounding area.

== Economy ==
Kranj is a mainly industrial city with significant electronics and rubber industries. It experienced a wave of deindustrialisation with many of its factories going bankrupt following independence in 1991, leaving behind several brownfields. In recent years, its manufacturing sector has become more based around highly-competitive export-oriented industries. Major industrial companies operating in Kranj include Goodyear (under their subsidiary Goodyear Dunlop Sava), Iskratel and Hidria.

== Landmarks ==
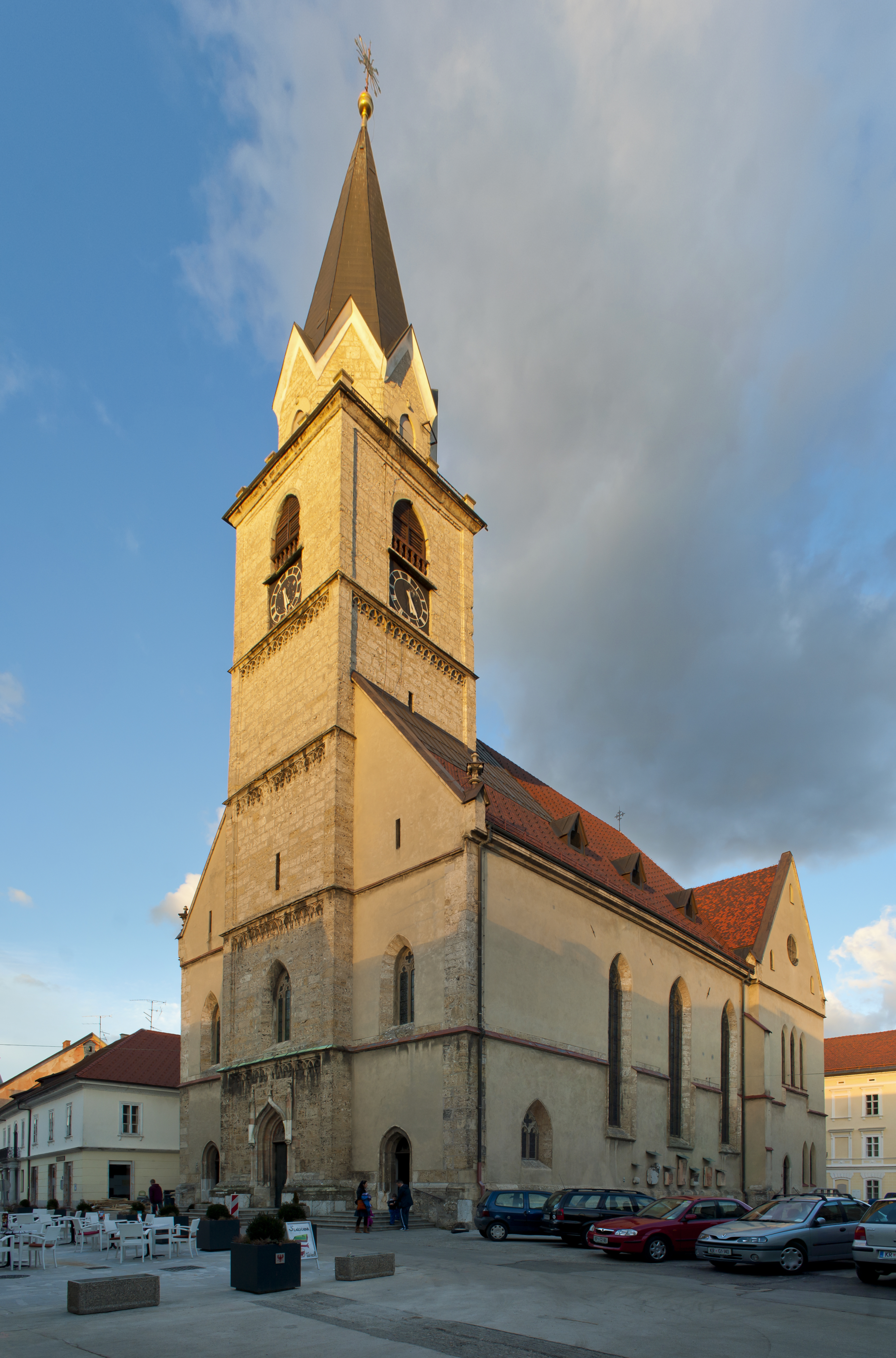
St. Cantianus' Church

=== St. Cantianus and Companions Parish Church ===
The St. Cantianus and Companions Parish Church (Župnijska cerkev sv. Kancijana in tovarišev) is the largest church in Kranj and also the seat of the Kranj Parish and Deaconates. It was built in the 14th century, and measures 442 cubic metres (15,600 cu ft). Construction was commissioned by the counts of Kranj.

=== Kieselstein Castle ===
The castle was built in the mid-16th century by Baron Johann Jakob Khisl. Later owners included the families of Moscon, Ravbar, Apfaltrer, Auersperg, and Pagliaruzzi. The building was renovated in 1952 by the architect Jože Plečnik in his late period. The castle garden is currently used as a concert setting.

== Culture ==
The city is known for its sports facilities, including soccer, tennis and basketball, as well as the biggest aquatic centre in the country, which hosted the 2003 Men's European Water Polo Championship (along with Ljubljana, hosting the women's competition). The annual Teden Mladih (Youth Week) festival and Carniola Festival are very popular.

== Gallery ==
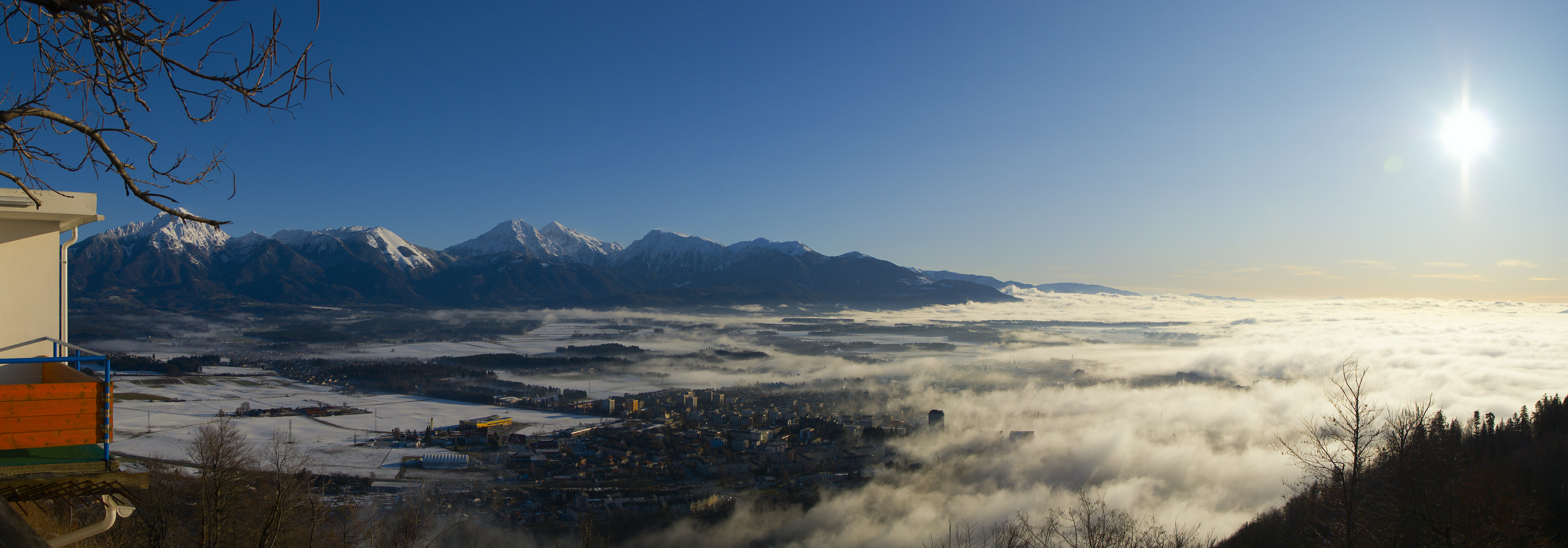
View of Kranj from Mount St. Margaret (Šmarjetna gora)

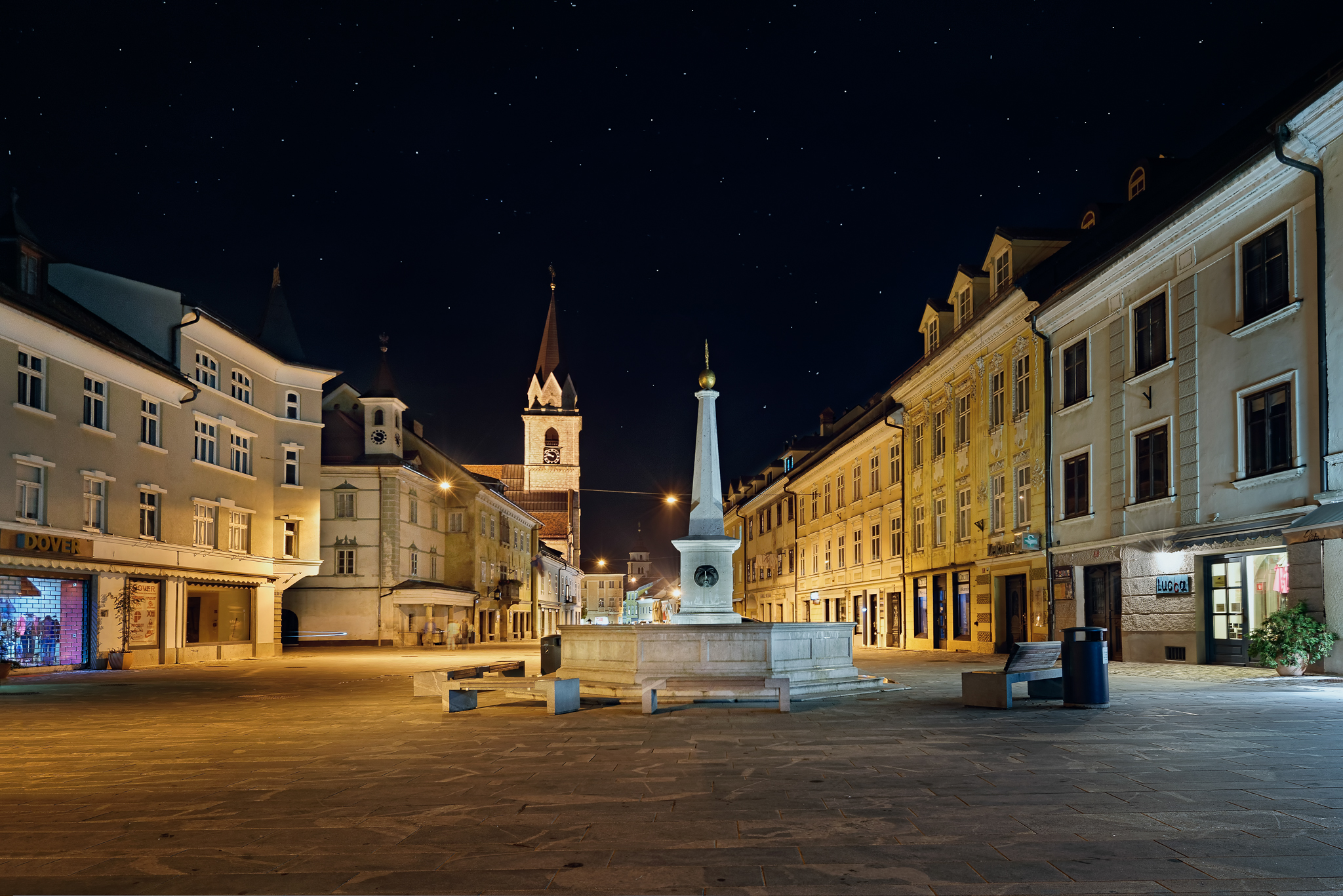
Main Square at night (Glavni trg)

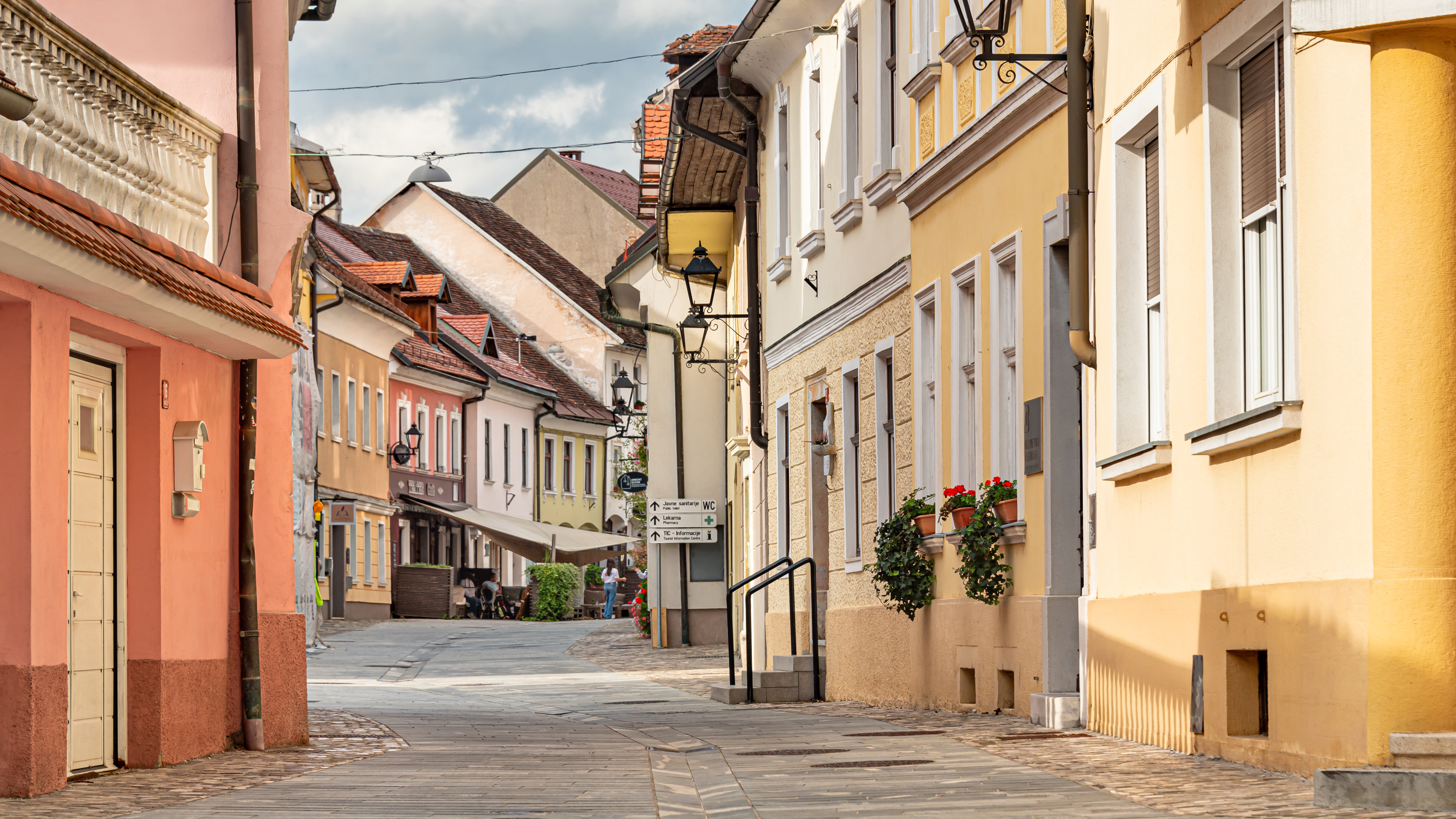
Old town street

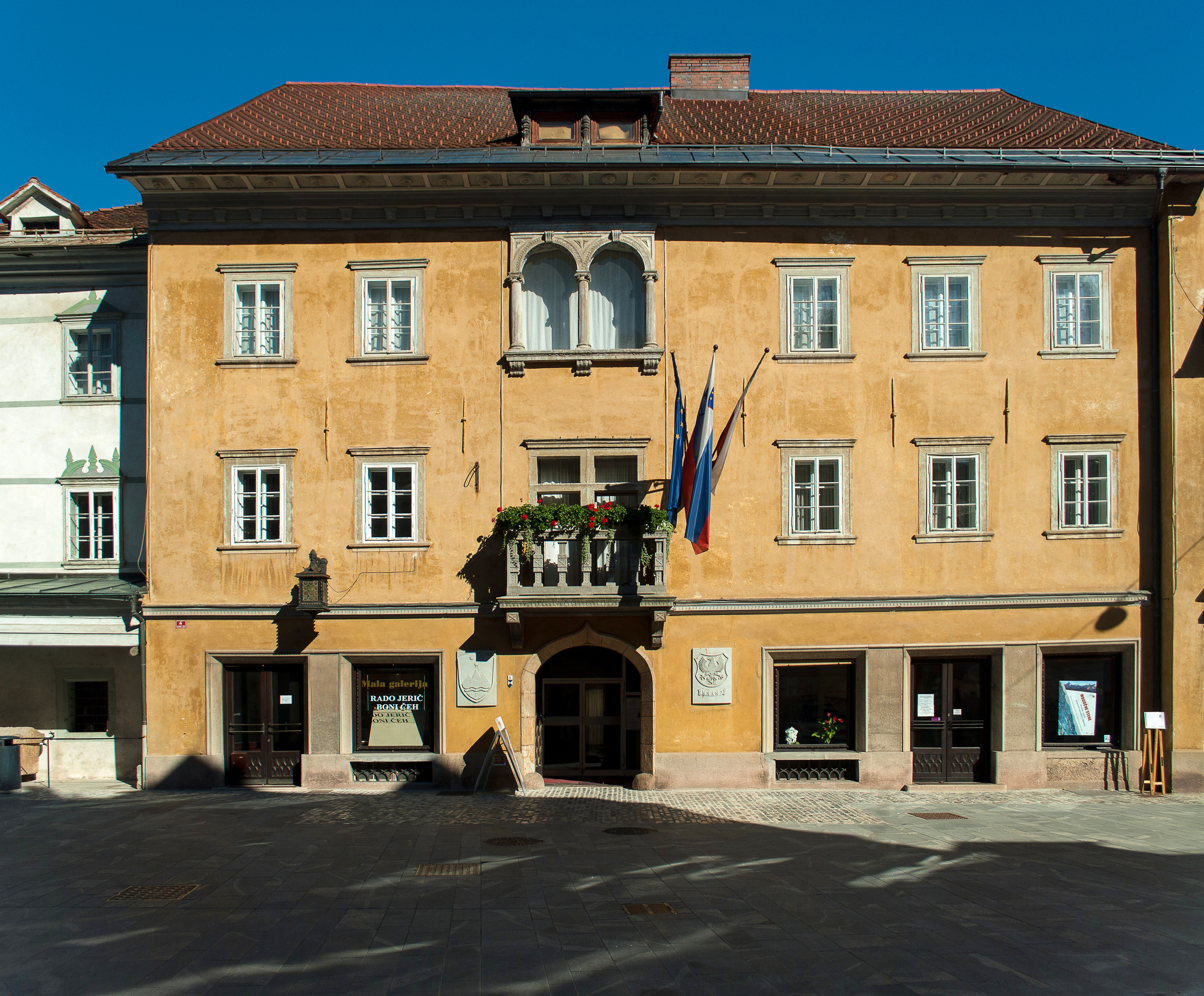
Kranj Town Hall

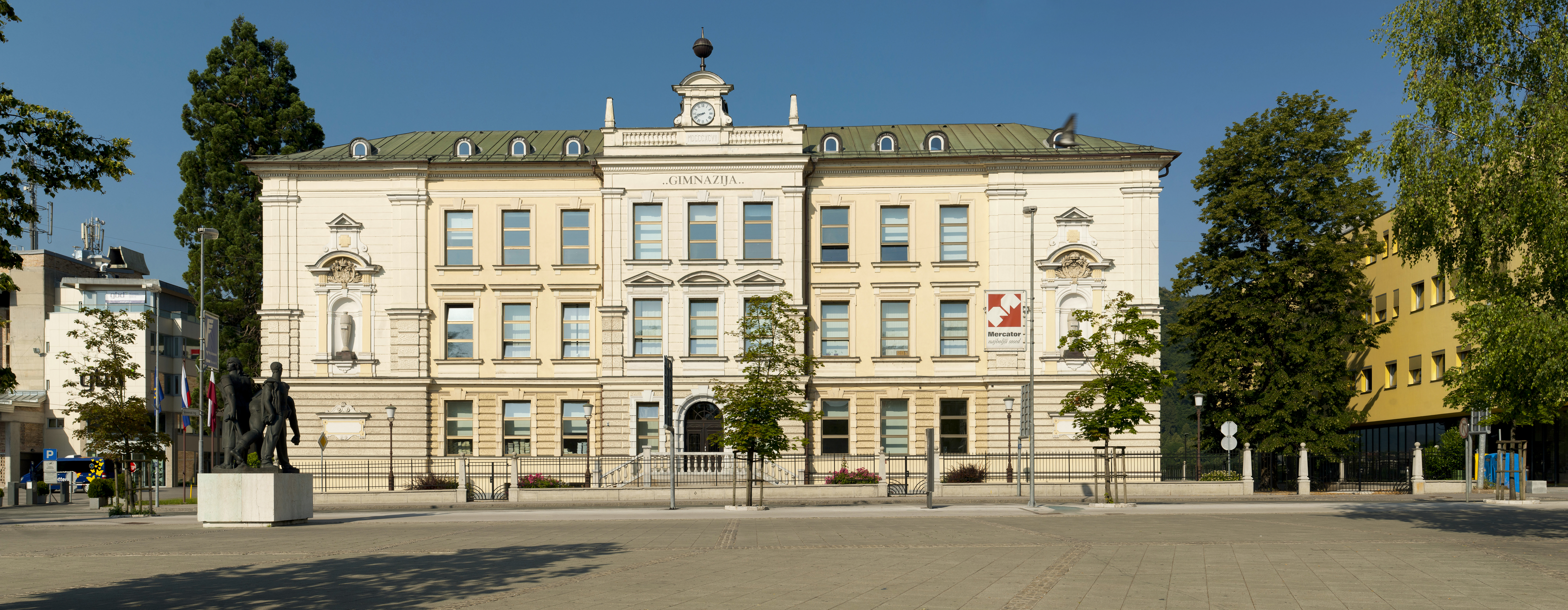
Kranj Gymnasium

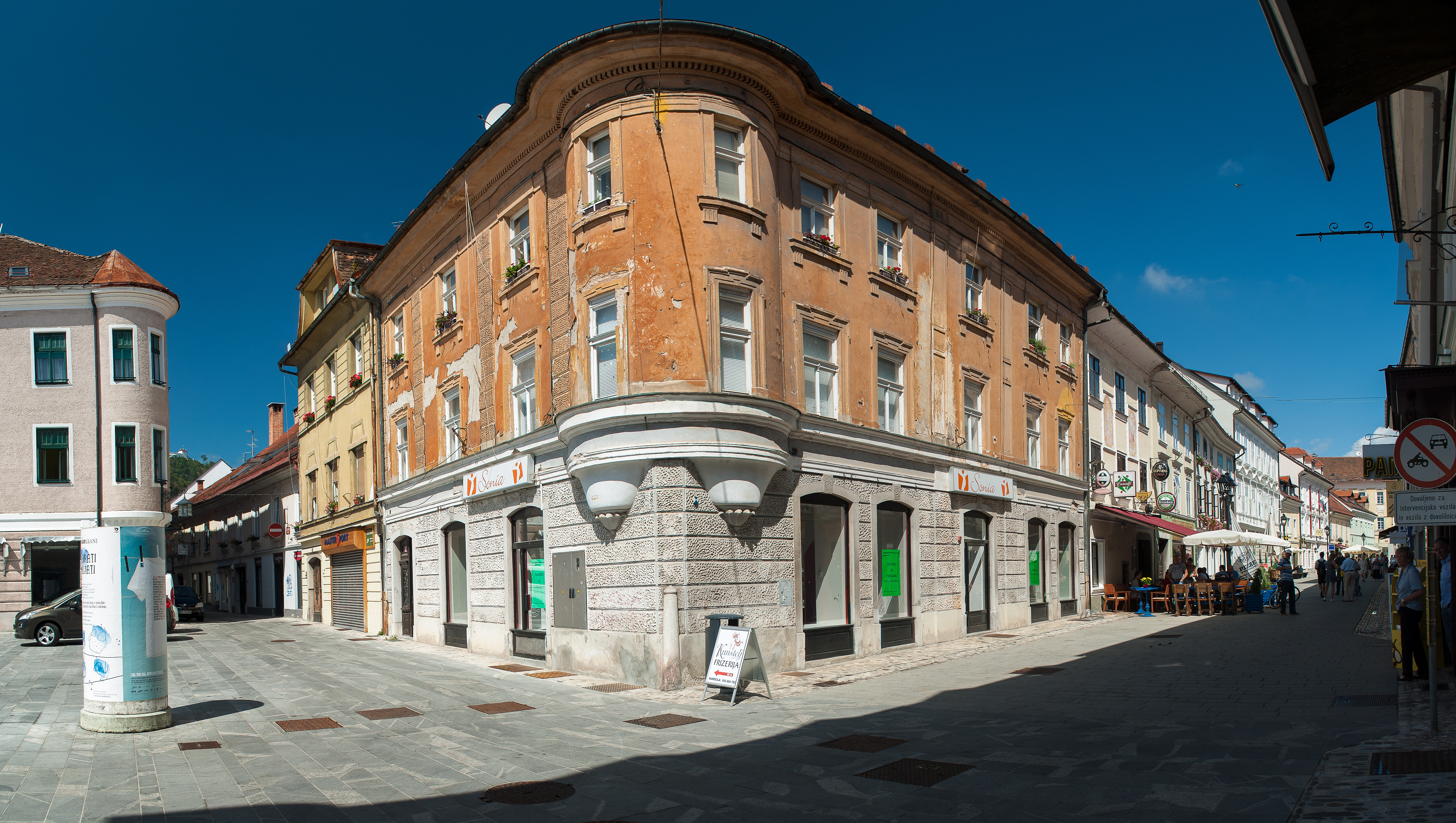
Corner building on Main Square (Glavni trg), Prešeren Street (Prešernova ulica) right, Jenko Street (Jenkova ulica) left

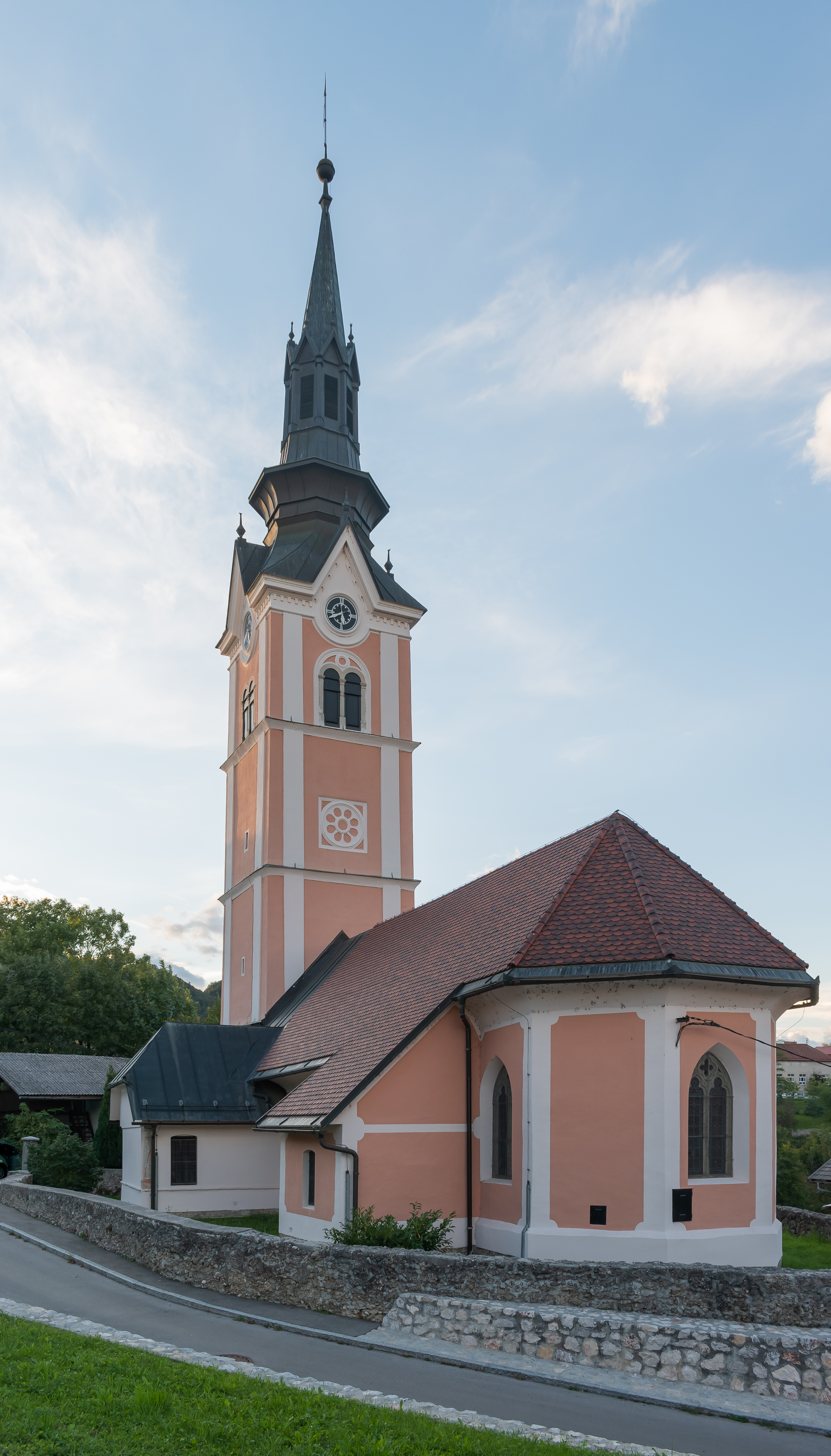
St. Joseph's Church

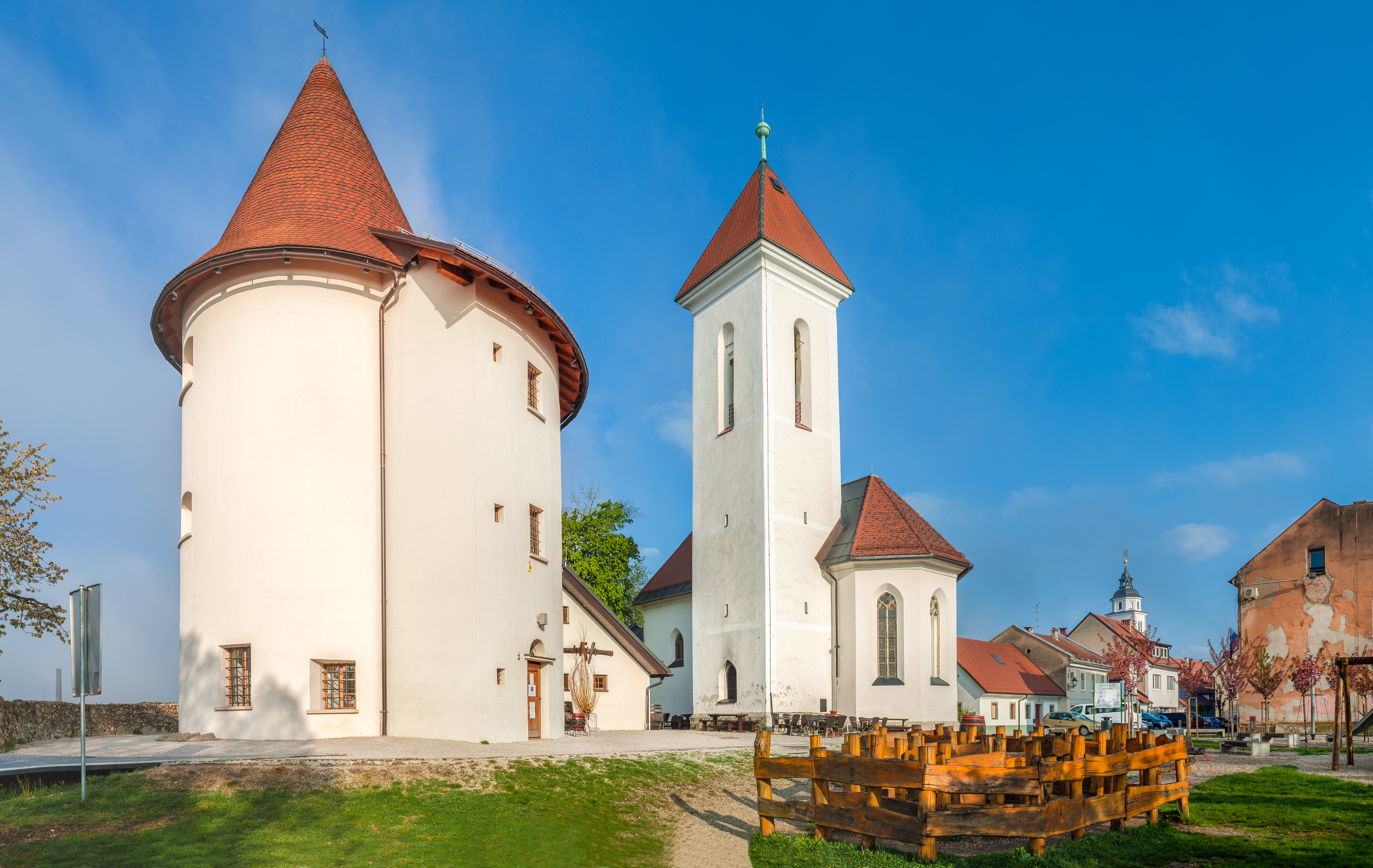
Pungert - Old Defense tower with St. Roch's Church

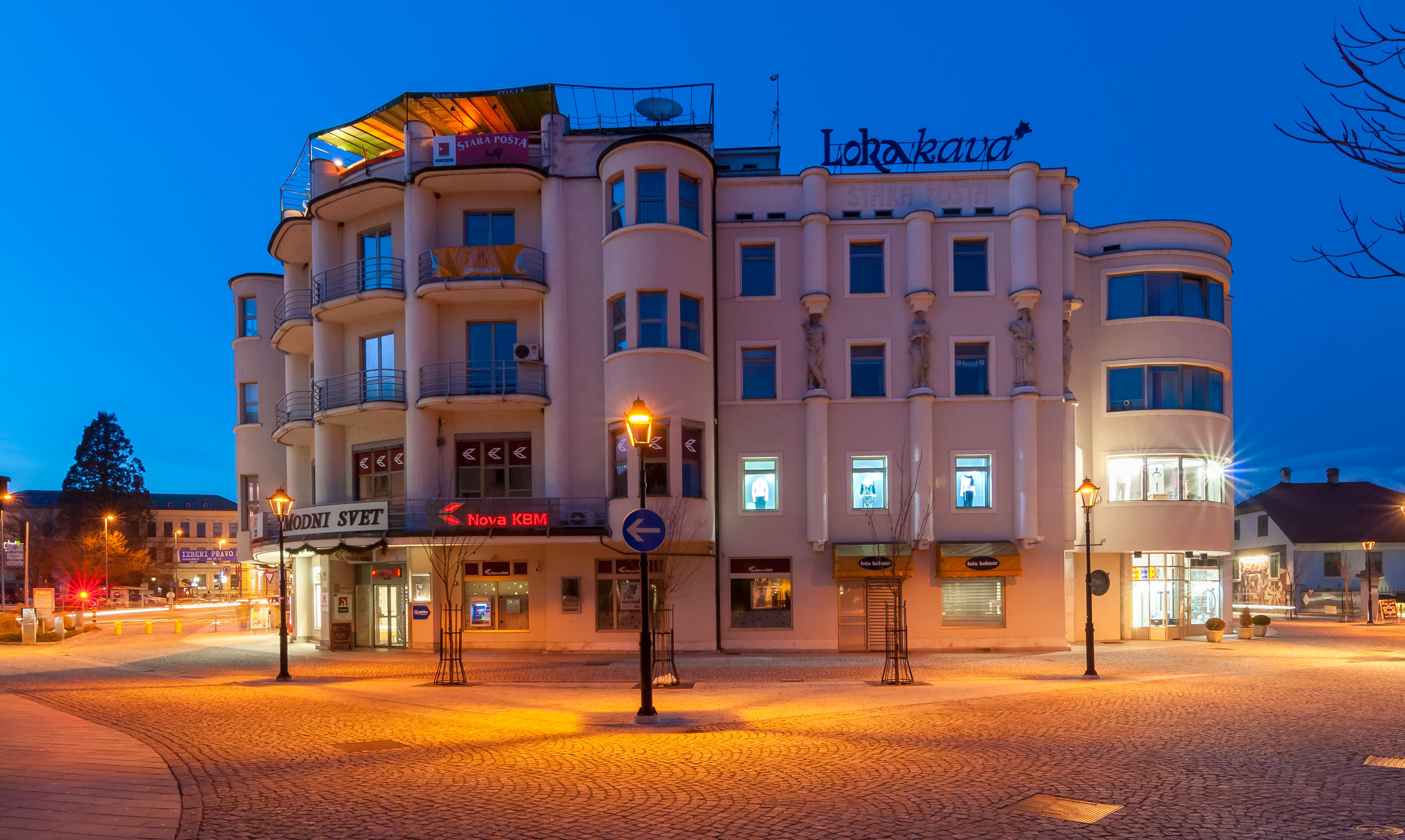
Stara Pošta shopping center

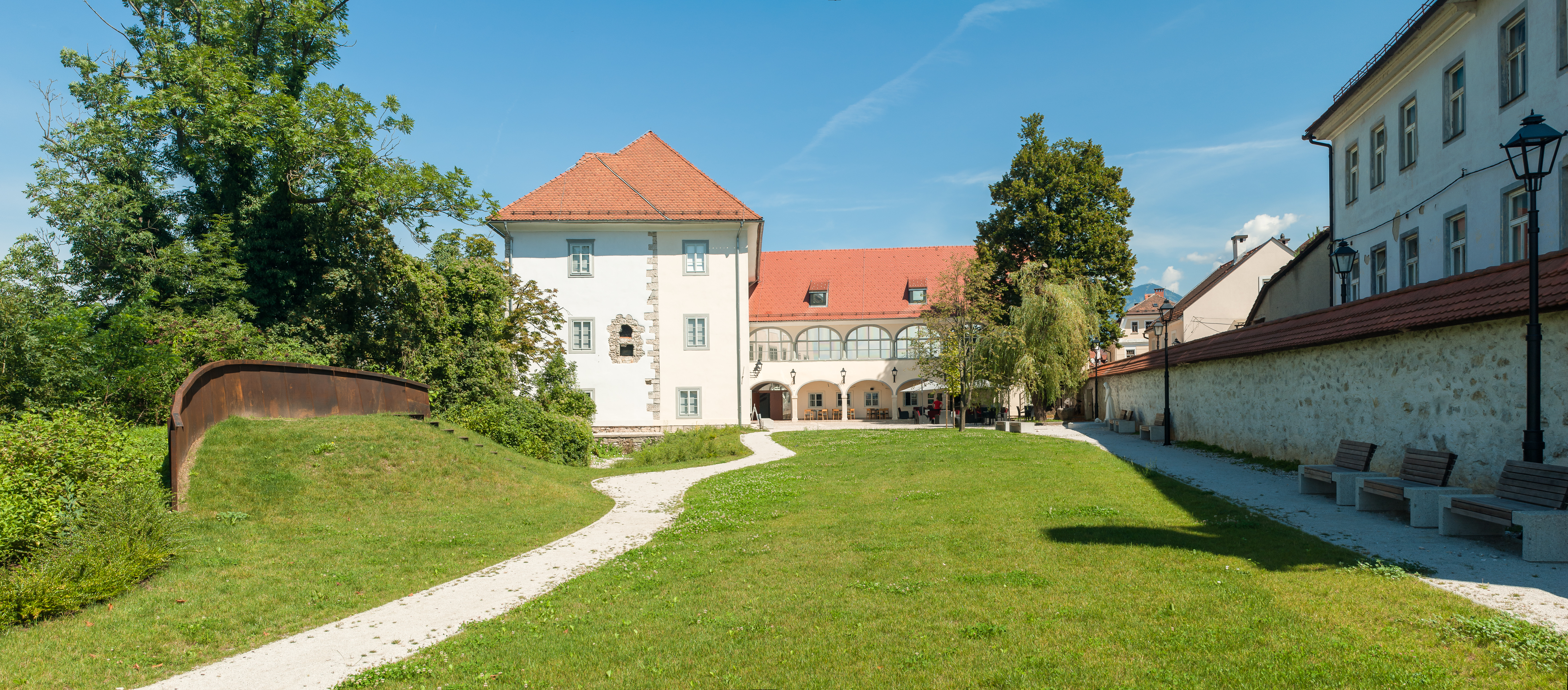
Kieselstein Castle

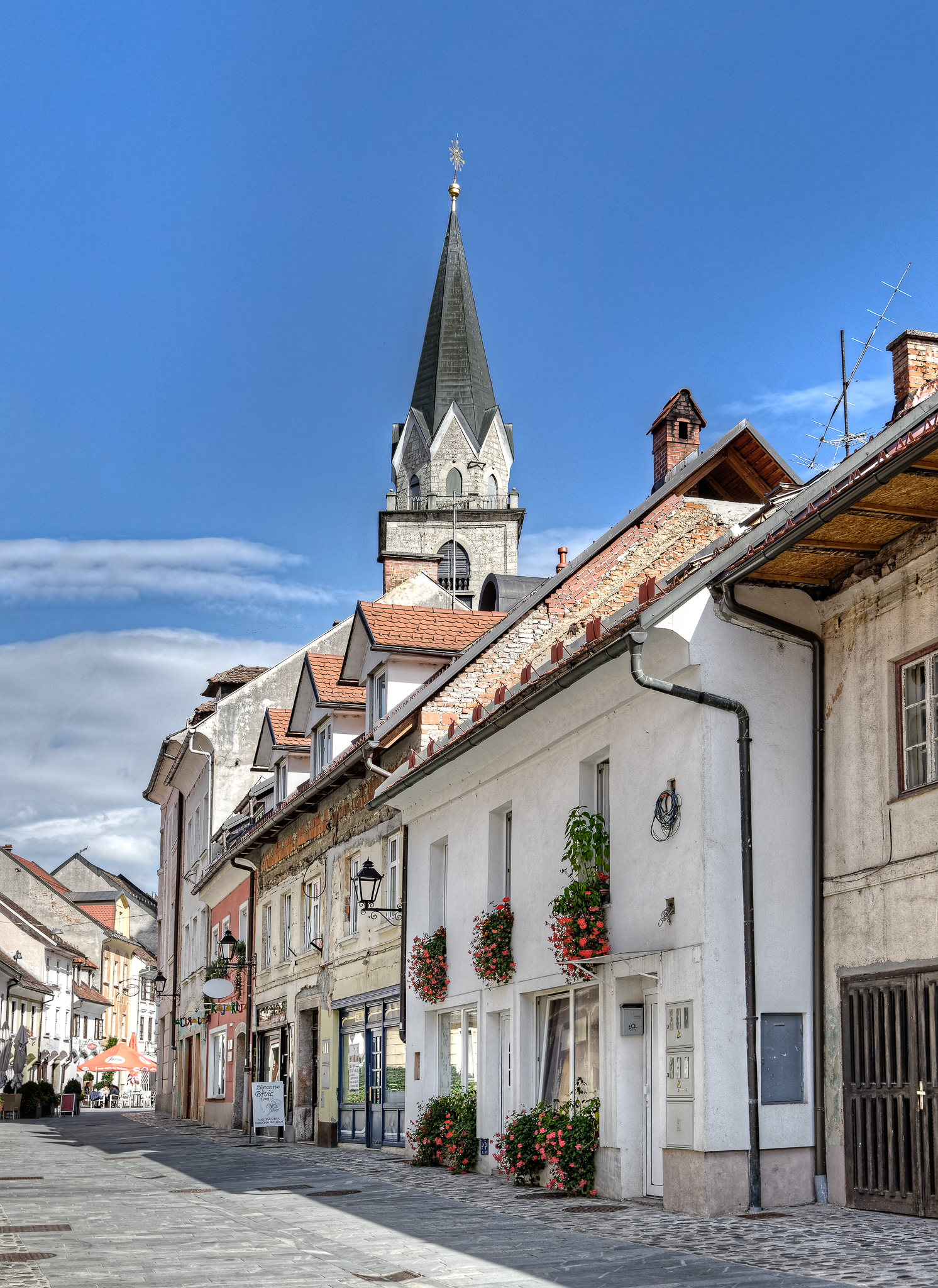
Old Town street

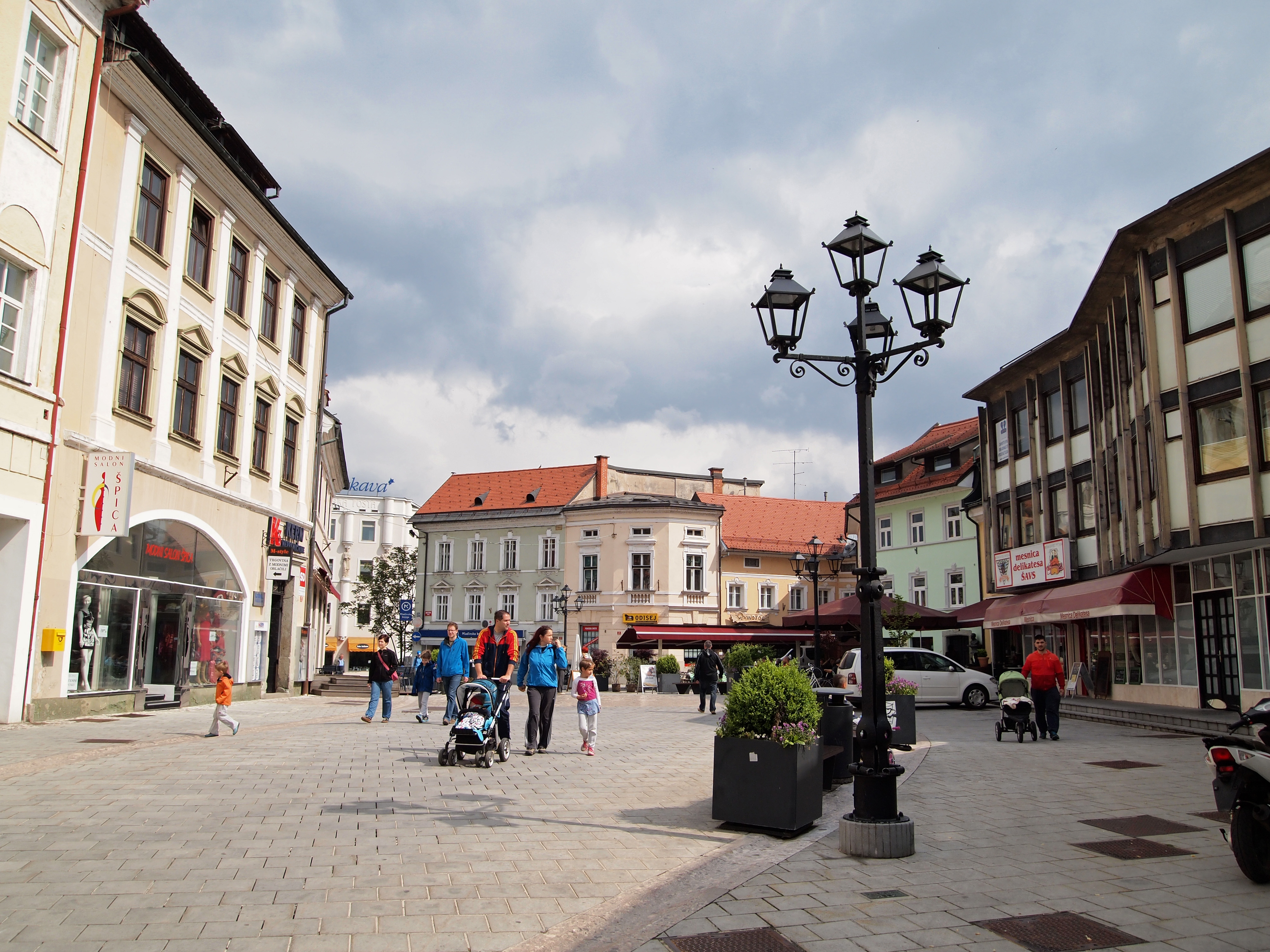
Maister Square

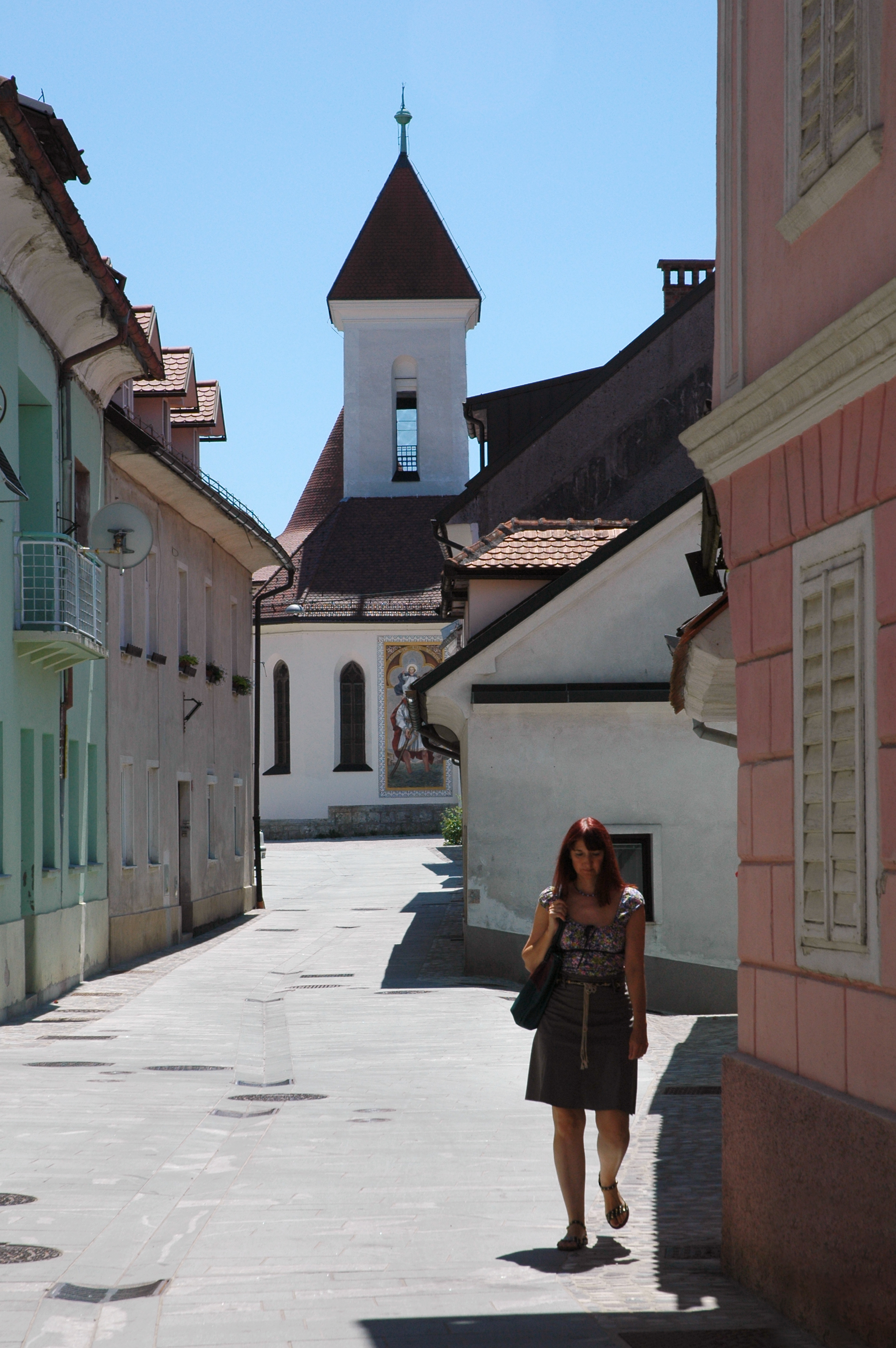
Cankar street

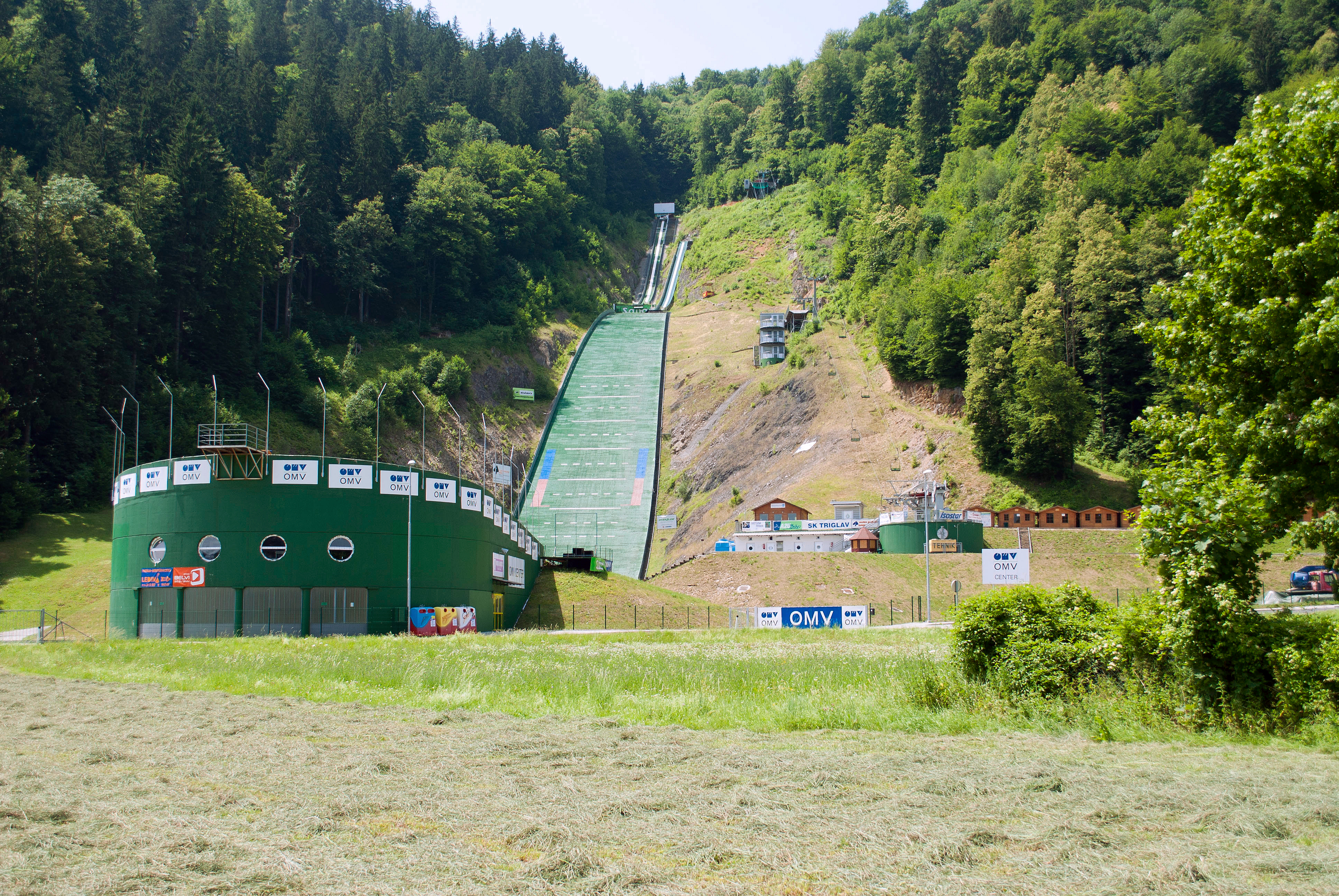
Bauhenk ski-jumping hill in Kranj

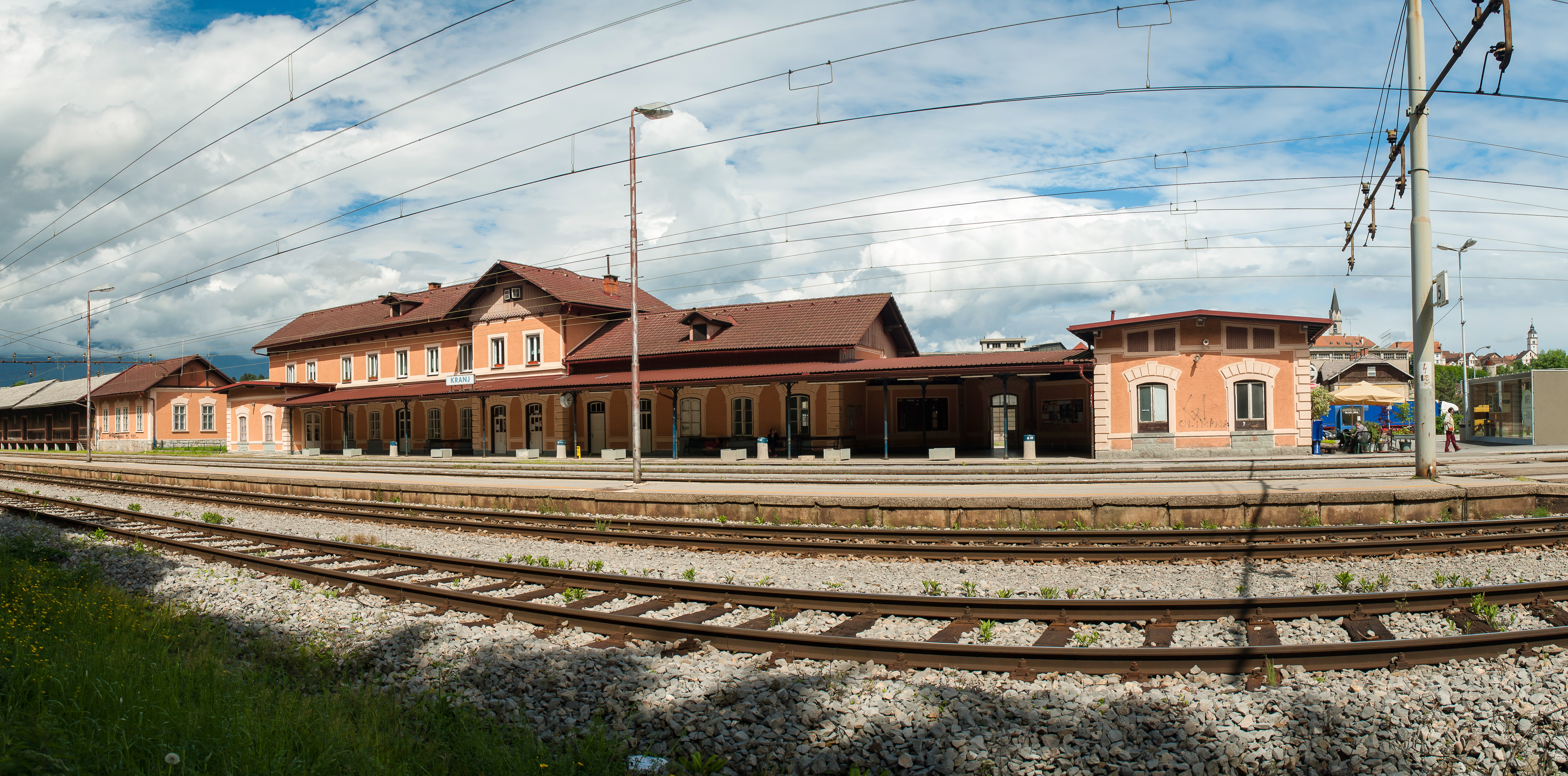
Kranj Train Station

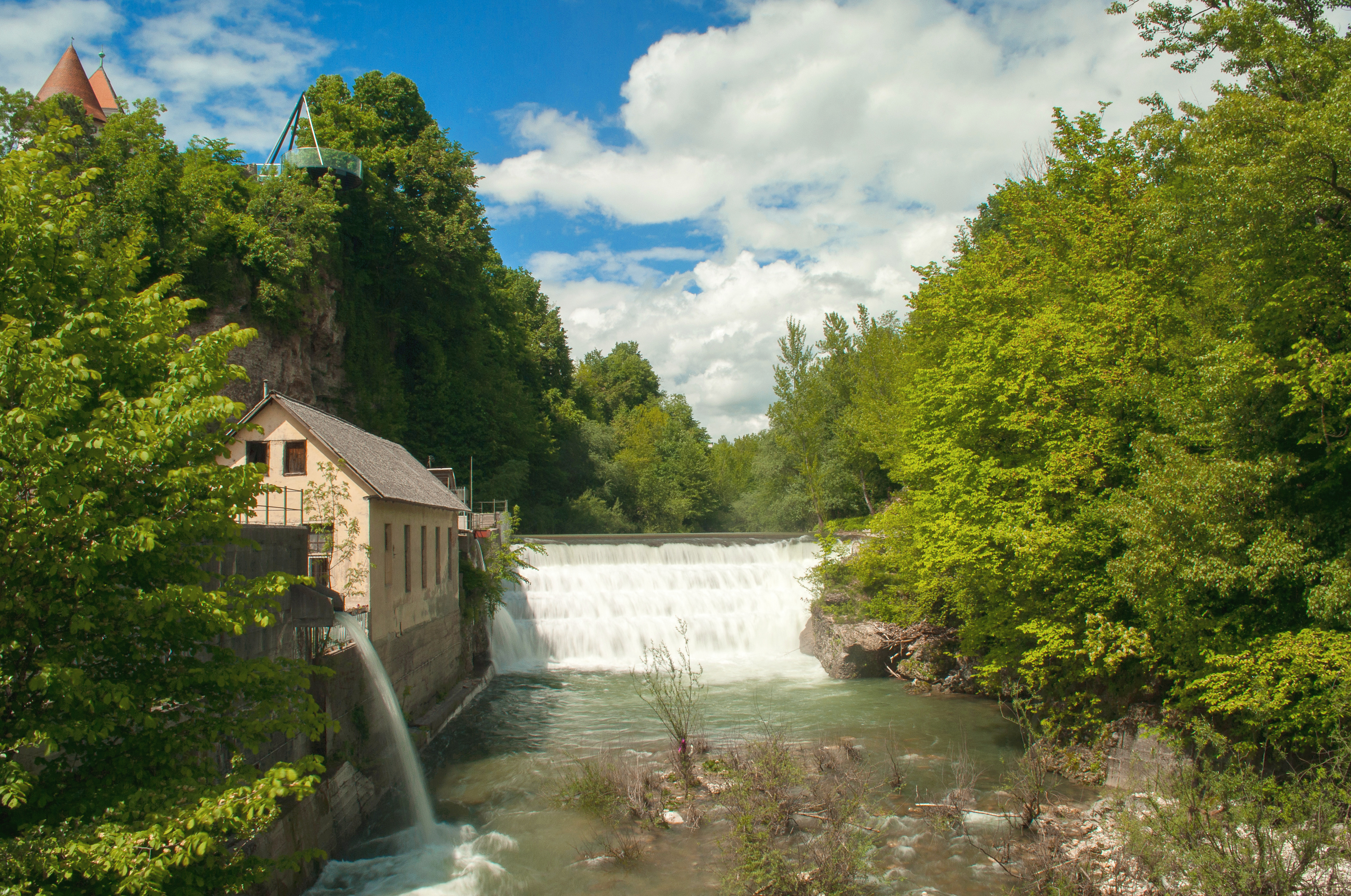
Kokra River in Kranj

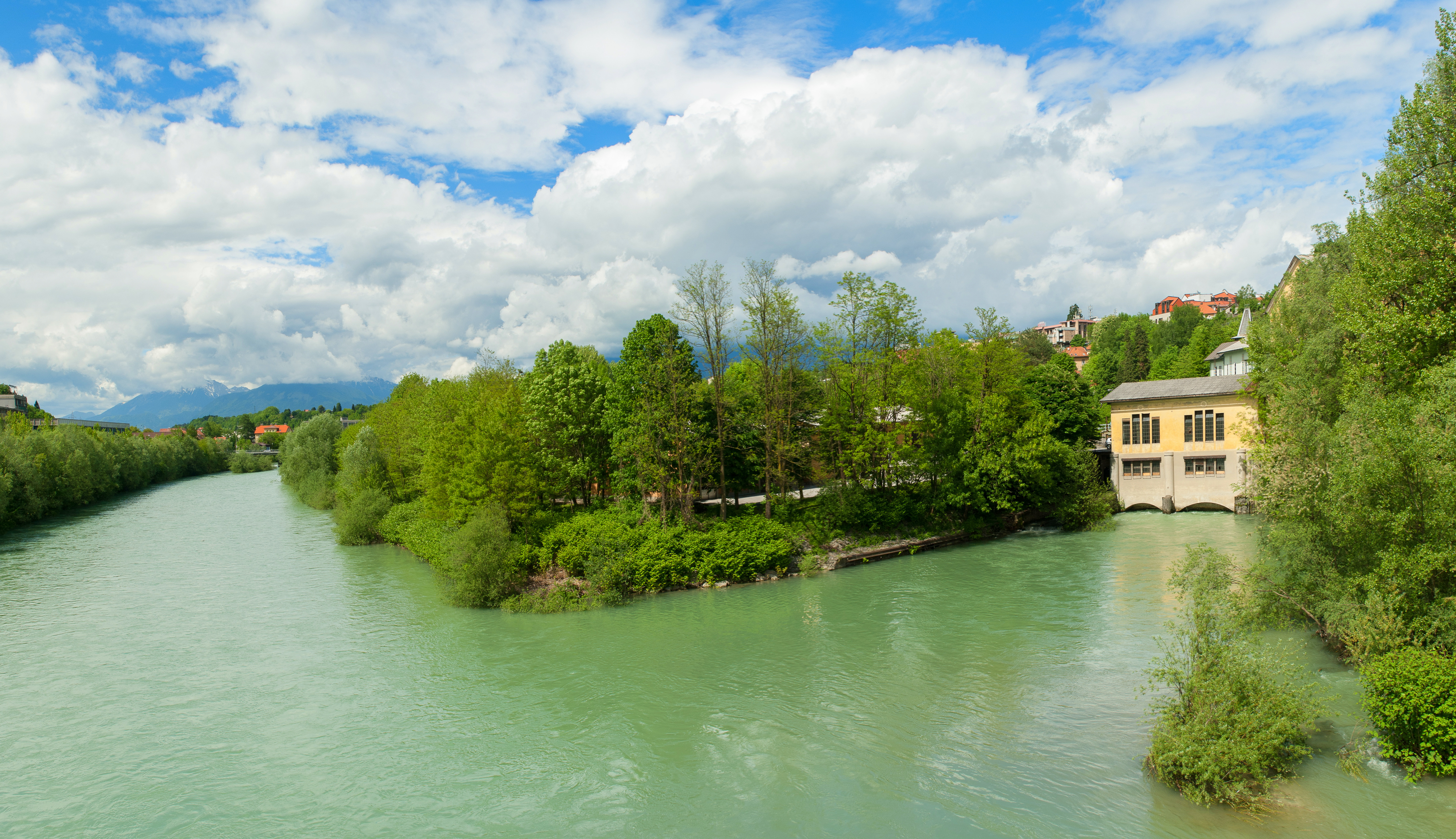
Sava River, Sava Hydroelectric Plant on right

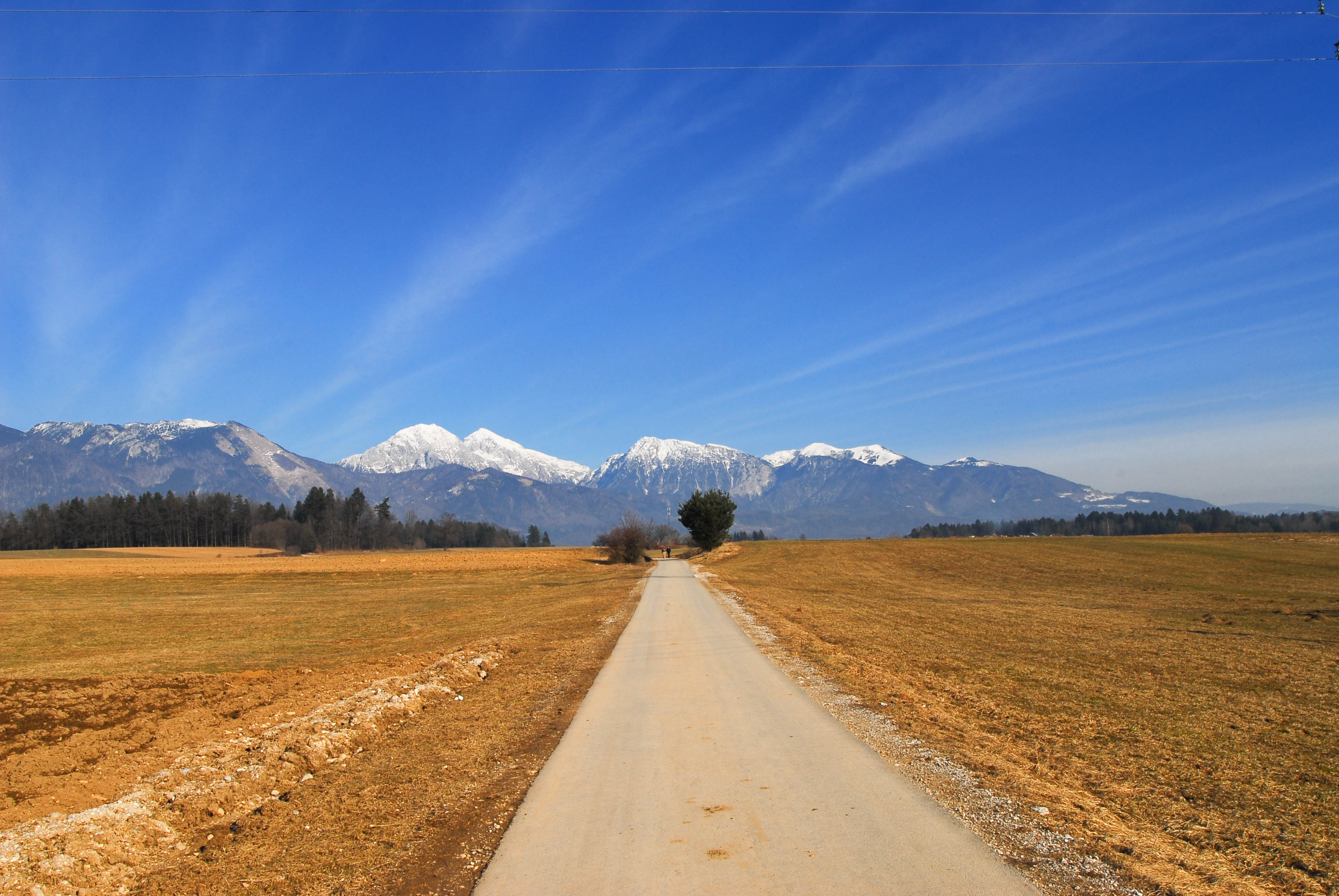
Kamnik–Savinja Alps seen from Kranj

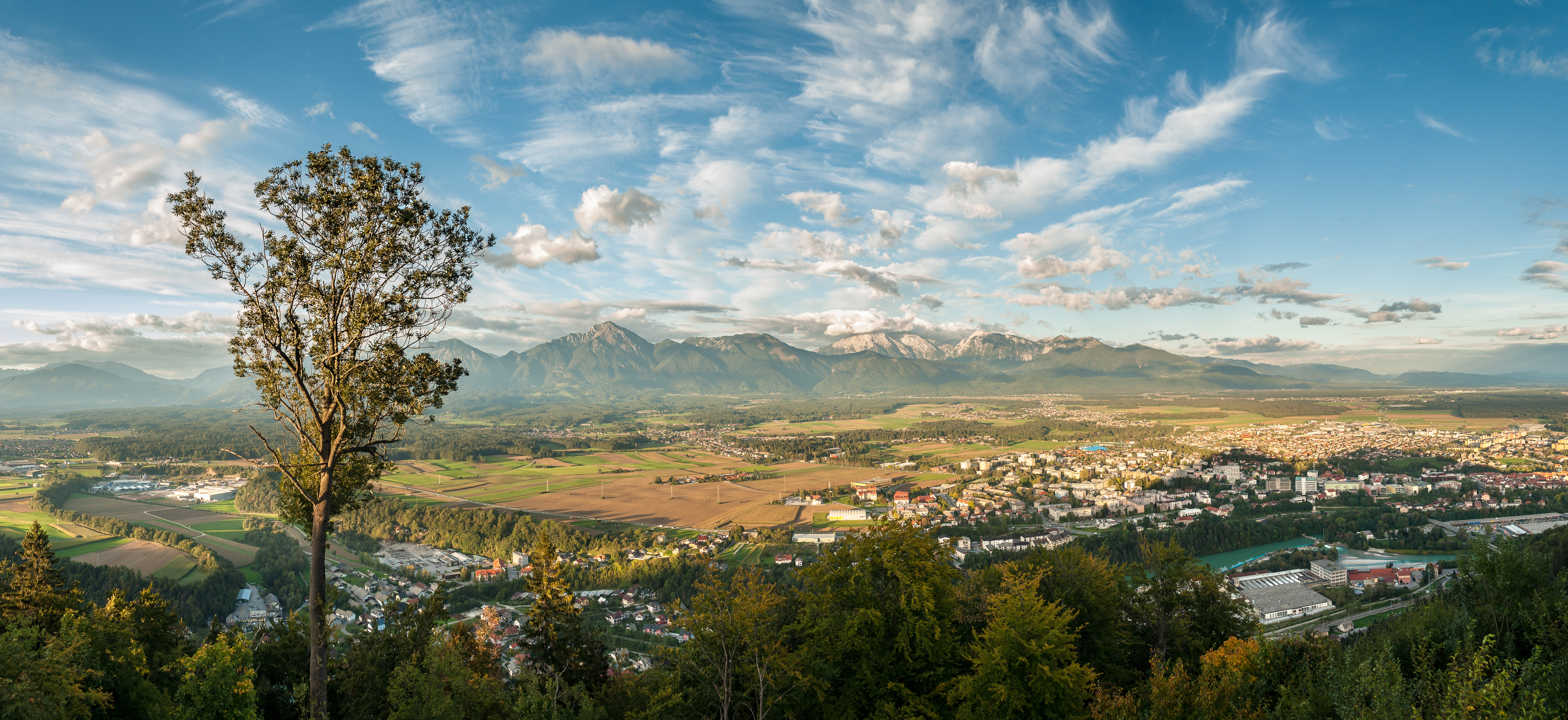
Panoramic view of Kranj and Kamnik–Savinja Alps from Mount St. Margaret (Šmarjetna gora)

== International relations ==
=== Twin towns and sister cities ===
Kranj is twinned with:

- Banja Luka, Bosnia and Herzegovina
- Bitola, North Macedonia
- Büyükçekmece, Turkey
- La Ciotat, France
- Colorado Springs, United States
- Doberdò del Lago, Italy
- Eisenkappel-Vellach, Austria
- Grožnjan, Croatia
- Herceg Novi, Montenegro
- Kočani, North Macedonia
- Kotor Varoš, Bosnia and Herzegovina
- Oldham, England, United Kingdom
- Pula, Croatia
- Rivoli, Italy
- Senta, Serbia
- Villach, Austria
- Zemun (Belgrade), Serbia
- Zhangjiakou, China

== Notable people ==
Notable people that were born or lived in Kranj include:

- Miroslav Ambrožič (1885–1944), physical education specialist
- Janez Mihael Arh (1678–c. 1730), actor and singer
- Franc Babič (1868–1913), merchant
- Friderik Irenej Baraga (1797–1868), missionary
- Dušan Bavdek (born 1971), composer
- Ana Belac (born 1997), first Slovenian to join the LPGA Tour
- Žan Benedičič (born 1995), football player
- Jurij Blatnik (born 1693), composer
- Janez Bleiweis (1808–1881), politician
- Franjo Bradaška (1829–1904), historian and geographer
- Fran Čadež (1882–1942), physicist and meteorologist
- Zvone Černe (1927–2007), industrialist
- Karel Dobida (1896–1964), art historian and critic
- Davorin Dolar (1921–2005), chemist
- Lojze Dolinar (1893–1970), sculptor
- Genti Sheholli (born 1997), singer and software developer
- Leon Engelman (1841–1862), poet and writer
- Vesna Fabjan (born 1985), cross country skier
- Gregor Fučka (born 1971), Italian basketball player
- Stojan Globočnik (1895–1985), designer and construction engineer
- Alojzij Goetzl (1820–1905), sculptor and painter
- Franc Serafin Goetzl (1783–1855), painter
- Gašpar Luka Goetzl (1782–1852), painter
- Josip Goetzl (1754–1806), painter
- Karel Goetzl (1816–1892), sculptor and painter
- Leopold Goetzl (1817–?), sculptor
- Stanko Gogala (1901–1987), education specialist
- Peter Graselli (1841–1933), politician
- Primož Grašič (born 1968), guitarist
- Anton Hayne (1786–1853), painter
- Boštjan Hladnik (1929–2006), film director
- Simon Jenko (1835–1869), poet
- Bojan Jokić (born 1986), footballer
- Ciril Metod Koch (1867–1925), architect
- Robert Kranjec (born 1981), ski jumper
- Anton Layer (1765–?), painter
- Leopold Layer (1752–1828), painter
- Marko Layer (1727–1808), painter
- Valentin Layer (1763–1810), painter
- Peter Lipar (1912–1980), composer
- Peter Malec (1909–1986), theater director
- Valentin Mandelc (1837–1872), writer and translator
- Janez Mencinger (1838–1912), writer
- Ernst Mally (1879–1944), philosopher
- Mihael Markič (1864–1939), grammarian
- Aleš Mejač (born 1983), footballer
- Janez Michor (a. 1626–1686), sculptor
- Marko Milič (born 1977), Slovenian basketball player
- Matej Mohorič (born 1994), cyclist
- Franc Novak (1908–1999), gynecologist
- Janez Jakob Olben (1643–1728), mathematician
- Nikolaj Omersa (1878–1932), literary historian
- Josip Paternoster (1847–1903), singer and theater actor
- Borut Petrič (born 1961) and Darjan Petrič (born 1964), freestyle swimmers
- Ciril Pirc (1865–1941), politician
- Valentin Pleiweis (1814–1881), merchant
- Lovrenc Pogačnik (1698–1768), Latin religious writer
- Marko Pogačnik (born 1944), sculptor
- Jan Polanc (born 1992), cyclist
- Dragotin Poljanec (1892–1940), painter
- Karel Pollak (1853–1937), merchant and industrialist
- Jakob Posinger, founder of Prvi partizan ammunition factory in 1927, who started with a workshop in Kranj
- Ivan Pregelj (1883–1960), writer
- Marij Pregelj (1913–1967), painter
- France Prešeren (1800–1849), poet
- Nina Prešiček (born 1976), classical pianist
- Mirko Pretnar (1898–1962), poet and translator
- Nika Prevc (born 2005), Olympian, ski jumper
- Peter Prevc (born 1992), ski jumper
- Janez Puhar (1814–1864), inventor of a glass photography process
- Aleksandar Radosavljević (born 1979), footballer
- Ivan Rakovec (1866–1925), industrialist
- Franc Remec (1846–1917), playwright
- Franjo Roš (1898–1976), poet and children's writer
- Ivan Rozman (1873–1960), writer and journalist
- Marjan Rus (1905–1974), concert and opera singer
- Evgen Sajovic (1880–1916), athletics specialist
- Gvido Sajovic (1883–1920), natural scientist
- Ivan Savnik (1879–1950), industrialist and merchant
- Karel Šavnik (1874–1928), physician
- Leo Šavnik (1897–1968), physician
- Pavel Šavnik (1882–1924), dermatologist
- Florijan Sentimer (1786–1836), physician
- Andrej Šifrer (born 1952), musician
- Ljubo Sirc (born 1920), economist
- Fran Skaberne (1877–1951), lawyer
- Minka Skaberne (1882–1965), education specialist
- Viktor Skaberne (1878–1956), designer and construction engineer
- Hinko Smrekar (1883–1942), painter
- Blaž Snedic (c. 1631–1684), merchant and banker
- Marjan Šorli (1915–1975), architect
- Ivo Štempihar (1898–1955), journalist
- Jurij Štempihar (1891–1978), lawyer
- France Štiglic (1919–1993), film director and journalist
- Andrej Štremfelj (born 1956), alpinist
- Gustav Strniša (1887–1970), poet and children's writer
- Suimon Strupi (1813–1880), veterinarian
- Desanka Švara (Schwara; born 1959), historian
- Aliash Tepina, actor
- Fidelis Terpinc (1799–1875), businessman
- Tadej Valjavec (born 1977), cyclist
- Anzelm Wissiak (1837–1876), painter
- Edvard Wissiak (1841–1874), painter
- Franz Wissiak (a.k.a. Franc Vizjak, 1810–1880), painter
- Grega Žemlja (born 1986), tennis player
- Janko Žirovnik (1855–1946), folk song collector and musician
- Franc Zupanc (1853–1922), technical writer
