= Orehek =

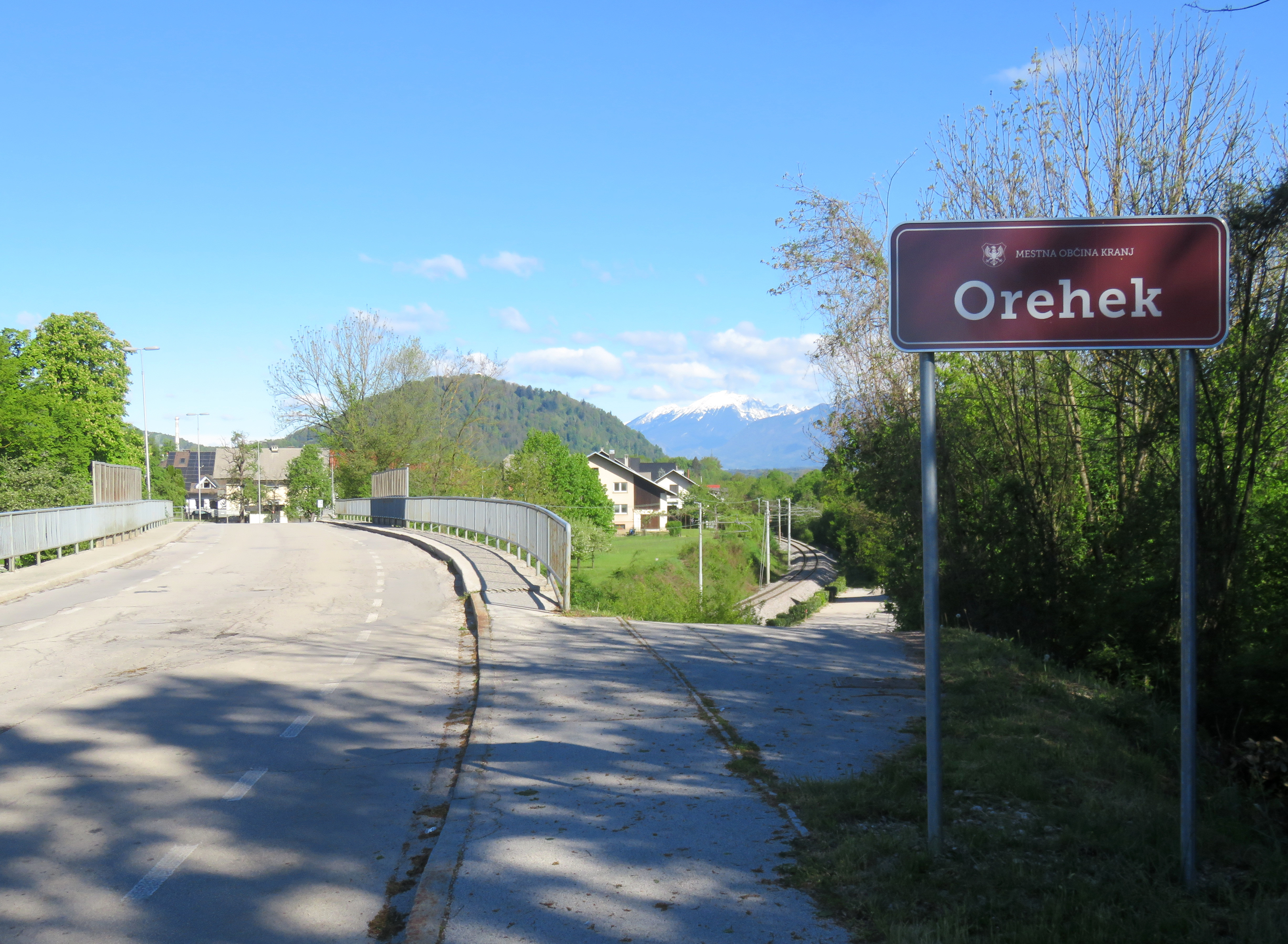

- Location in Slovenia
- Coordinates: 46°13′18″N 14°21′53″E
- Country: Slovenia
- Traditional region: Upper Carniola
- Statistical region: Upper Carniola
- Municipality: Kranj
- Elevation: 371 m (1,217 ft)

Orehek (pronounced [ɔˈɾeːxək], German: Orechek) is a former settlement in the Municipality of Kranj in the Upper Carniola region of Slovenia. It now corresponds to the neighborhood of Orehek in Kranj.

== Geography ==
Orehek stands on the right bank of the Sava River, between Labore to the north and Drulovka to the south.

== Name ==
Orehek was mentioned in written sources as Nusdorff in 1423 and as Nussdorff in 1481. It is derived from the common noun oreh 'walnut', referring to the local vegetation.

== History ==
Orehek had a population of 93 living in 13 houses in 1869, 86 in 14 houses in 1880, 84 in 15 houses in 1890, and 71 in 13 houses in 1900. Orehek was annexed by the city of Kranj in 1957, ending its existence as a separate settlement.
