= Labore =

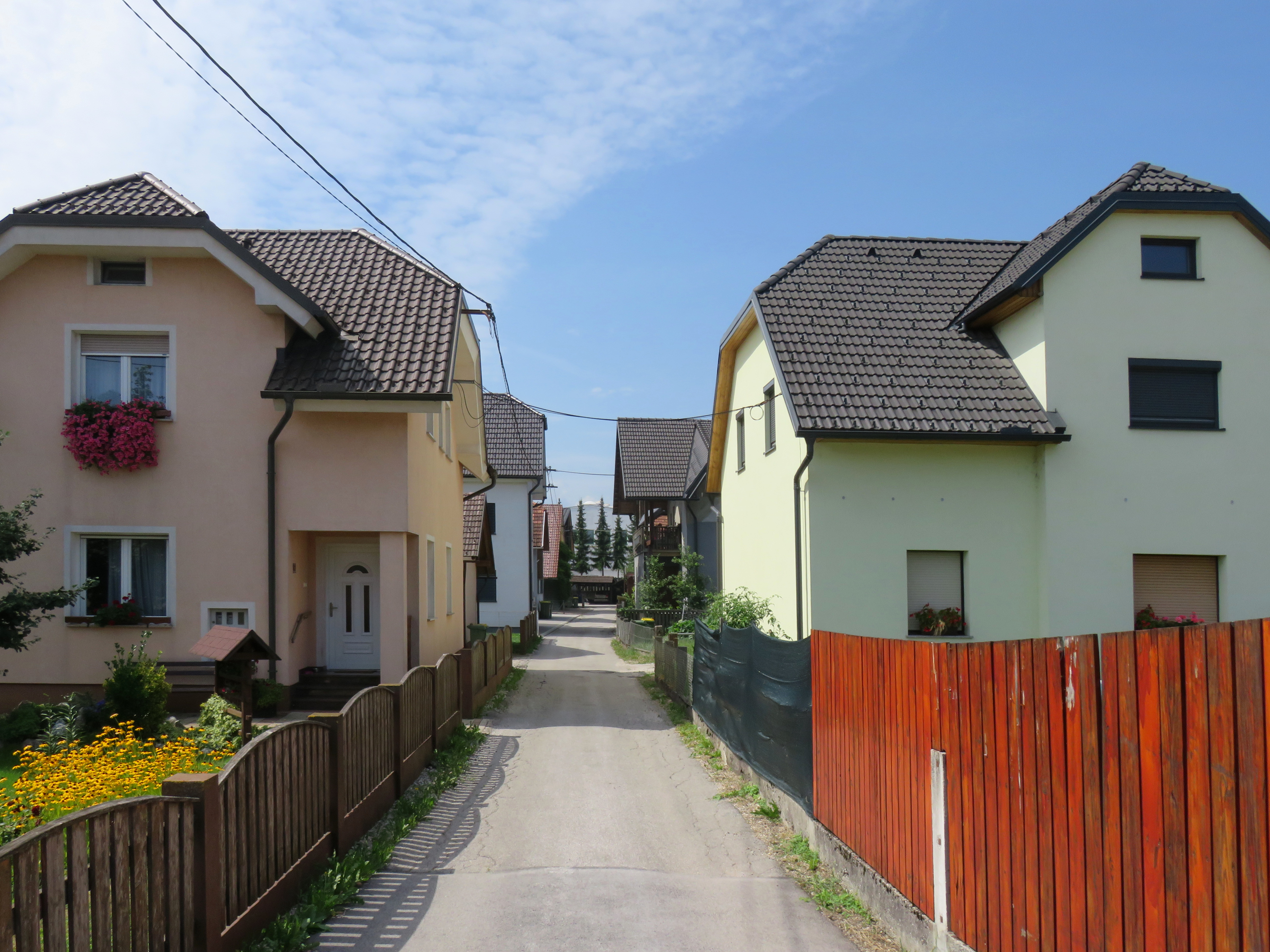

- Location in Slovenia
- Coordinates: 46°13′47″N 14°21′17″E
- Country: Slovenia
- Traditional region: Upper Carniola
- Statistical region: Upper Carniola
- Municipality: Kranj
- Elevation: 386 m (1,266 ft)

Labore (pronounced [ˈlaːbɔɾɛ]) is a former settlement in the Municipality of Kranj in the Upper Carniola region of Slovenia. It now corresponds to the neighborhood of Labore in Kranj.

== Geography ==
Labore stands above the right bank of the Sava River, between Stražišče to the northwest and Orehek to the south.

== Name ==
Labore was mentioned in written sources as Lauer in 1347, Lafer in 1442, and Laffer in 1485. The name is a plural form of the common noun labora 'conglomerate stone', referring to the local geography.

== History ==
Labore had a population of 19 living in six houses in 1900. Labore was annexed by the city of Kranj in 1957, ending its existence as a separate settlement.

== Cultural heritage ==
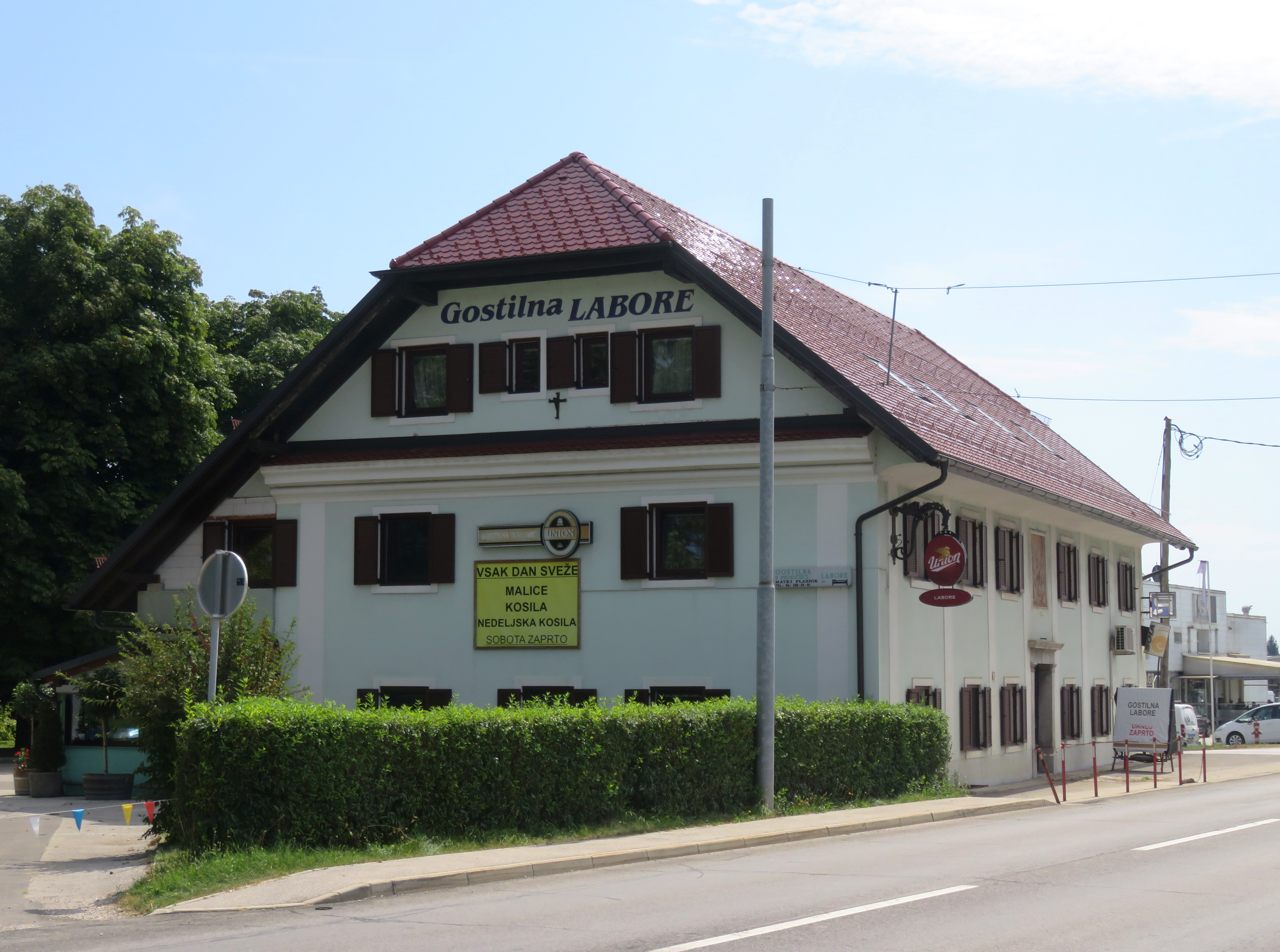
The Labore Inn

The Labore Inn at Ljubljana Street (Ljubljanska cesta) no. 16 in Labore is registered as cultural heritage. It is a two-story Baroque structure built in the classical style with a rectangular layout and a half-hip roof. The facade is divided by lesenes and has a fresco depicting the Annunciation and Saint Florian. The building dates from the 18th century with modifications made in 1865.
