= Savnik (surname) =

Savnik is a Slovene surname. Notable people with the surname include:

- Bojan Savnik (1914–unknown), Yugoslav Olympic canoeist
- Davorin Savnik (1929–2014), Slovenian industrial designer and architect
- Dušan Savnik (1919–1975), Slovenian lawyer, journalist, and translator
- Ivan Savnik (1879–1950), Slovenian industrialist and merchant
