= Aliash Tepina =

Slovenian actor

- Born: Aljaž Tepina; Kranj, Slovenia
- Occupation: Actor
- Years active: 2009–present
- Notable work: The Dark Knight Rises, Law & Order: UK

Aljaž Tepina, known as Aliash Tepina, is a Slovenian actor.

Tepina was born in Kranj. He studied acting at Central School of Speech and Drama in London. His professional career started with a role in Slovenian TV Film Skriti spomin Angele Vode (2009). He also appeared in one episode of Law & Order: UK in 2009. His first major role was in The Dark Knight Rises. He also had roles in several short films.

== Work ==
=== Film ===
Year	Title	Role	Box office gross
2012	The Dark Knight Rises	Amon	$552 million

=== Television ===
Year	Title	Role	Note
2009	Skriti spomin Angele Vode	Rejc	TV movie
2009	Law & Order: UK (#1.5)	Will	TV series
2009	Holby City (#11.43)	Markos Kovac	TV series
2010	Silent Witness (#13.3, #13.4)	Martin Klosk	TV series
2011	Above Suspicion: Deadly Intent (#1.2, #1.3)	Andrej	TV series
2012	Na Pogled (On Sight)	Leon	short film
