= Ivan Savnik =

Slovene industrialist and merchant (1879–1950)

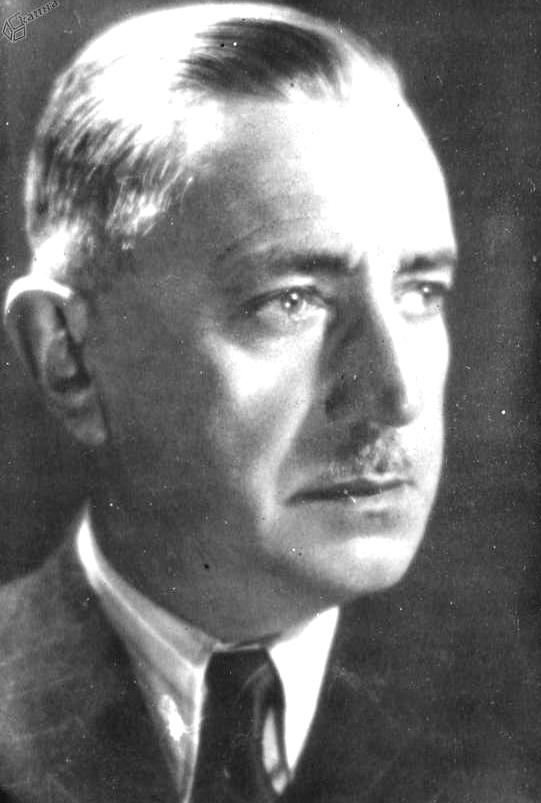
Ivan Savnik

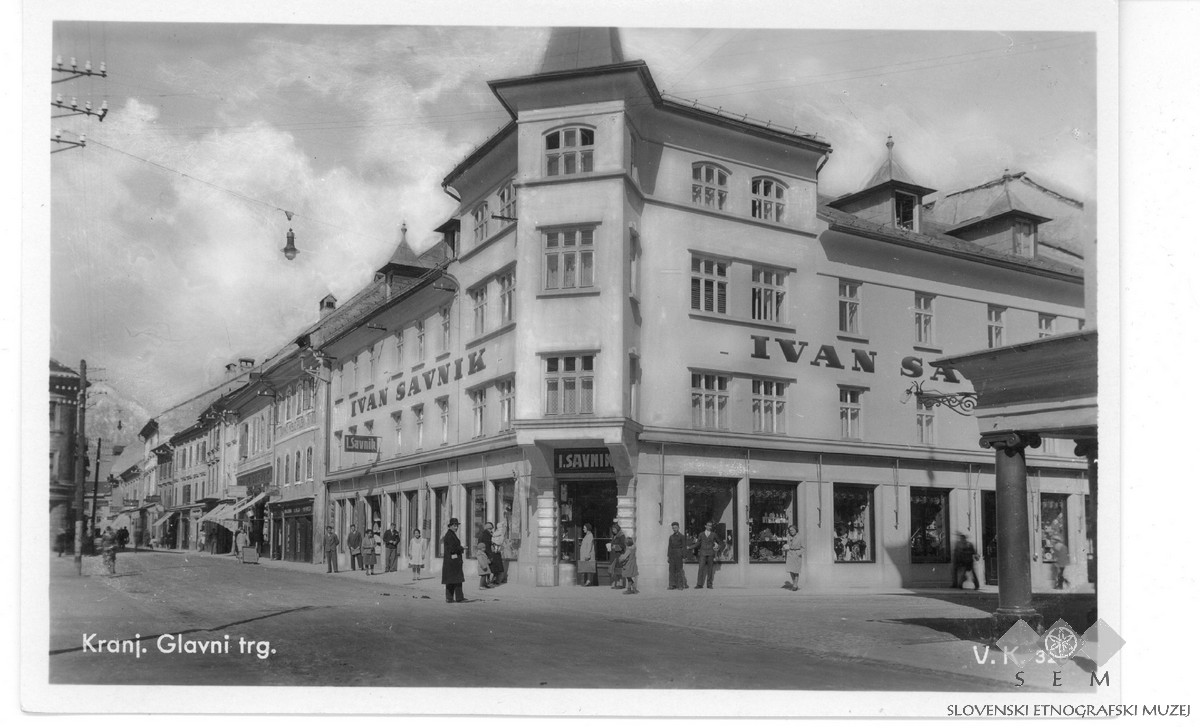
Department store of Ivan Savnik on the main square in Kranj, 1930s

Ivan Savnik (1879–1950) was a Slovene industrialist and merchant, one of the biggest manufacturers and retailers in the Upper Carniola region of Slovenia. With his products he supplied merchants across Austria-Hungary and later Yugoslavia. During the time of mayor Ciril Pirc he worked for many years as a councillor and advisor at the city council of Kranj. He was also actively involved in the construction of the National Hall (Narodni dom) in Kranj.
