= Drulovka =

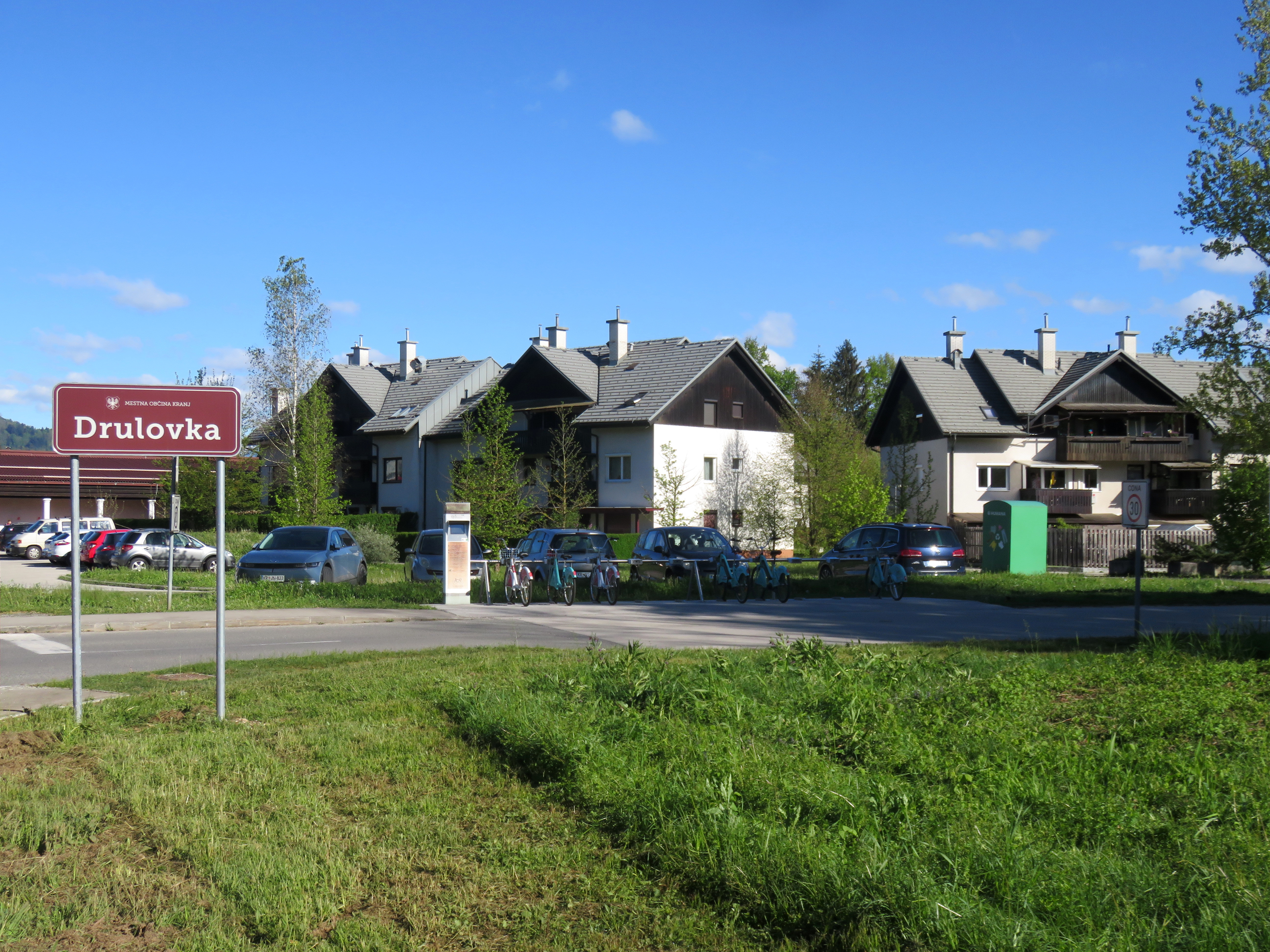

- Location in Slovenia
- Coordinates: 46°12′52.75″N 14°22′17.11″E
- Country: Slovenia
- Traditional region: Upper Carniola
- Statistical region: Upper Carniola
- Municipality: Kranj
- Elevation: 375 m (1,230 ft)

Drulovka (pronounced [ˈdɾuːlɔu̯ka]; in older sources also Druljevek, German: Drulouk) is a former settlement in the Municipality of Kranj in the Upper Carniola region of Slovenia. It now corresponds to the neighborhood of Drulovka in Kranj.

== Name ==
Drulovka was mentioned in written sources in 1436 as Drwlawitz (and as Drollewckg and Drolebck in 1439, and Drullweg in 1444). It is probably derived from a personal name, borrowed in turn from the Old High German name Drullo, thus meaning 'Drullo's (village)'. The name is less likely to be derived from a Slovenian root referring, for example, to the gorge of the Sava River. In the past the German name was Drulouk.

== History ==
Prehistoric artifacts have been found in the settlement, testifying to early habitation of the site. In 1955 and 1956, excavations were carried out at the Špik promontory (Slovene: Na Špiku) in the Zarice Gorge on the Sava, revealing material from the end of the Neolithic and from the early and middle Chalcolithic. Many of the stone tools and pottery fragments belong to the Alpine facies of the Lengyel culture or the older layers of the Lasinja culture, from the first quarter of the third millennium BC. In 1987, additional studies east of the site yielded not only stone tools and weapons but also pottery from the late Bronze Age (the Urnfield culture). A bronze ax from a burial mound on the western edge of the village is also associated with this time. Later finds include an early Christian oil lamp, as well as 8th-century Slavic graves discovered in 1956 near St. Michael's Church.

Drulovka was annexed by the city of Kranj in 1957, ending its existence as a separate settlement.

== Church ==
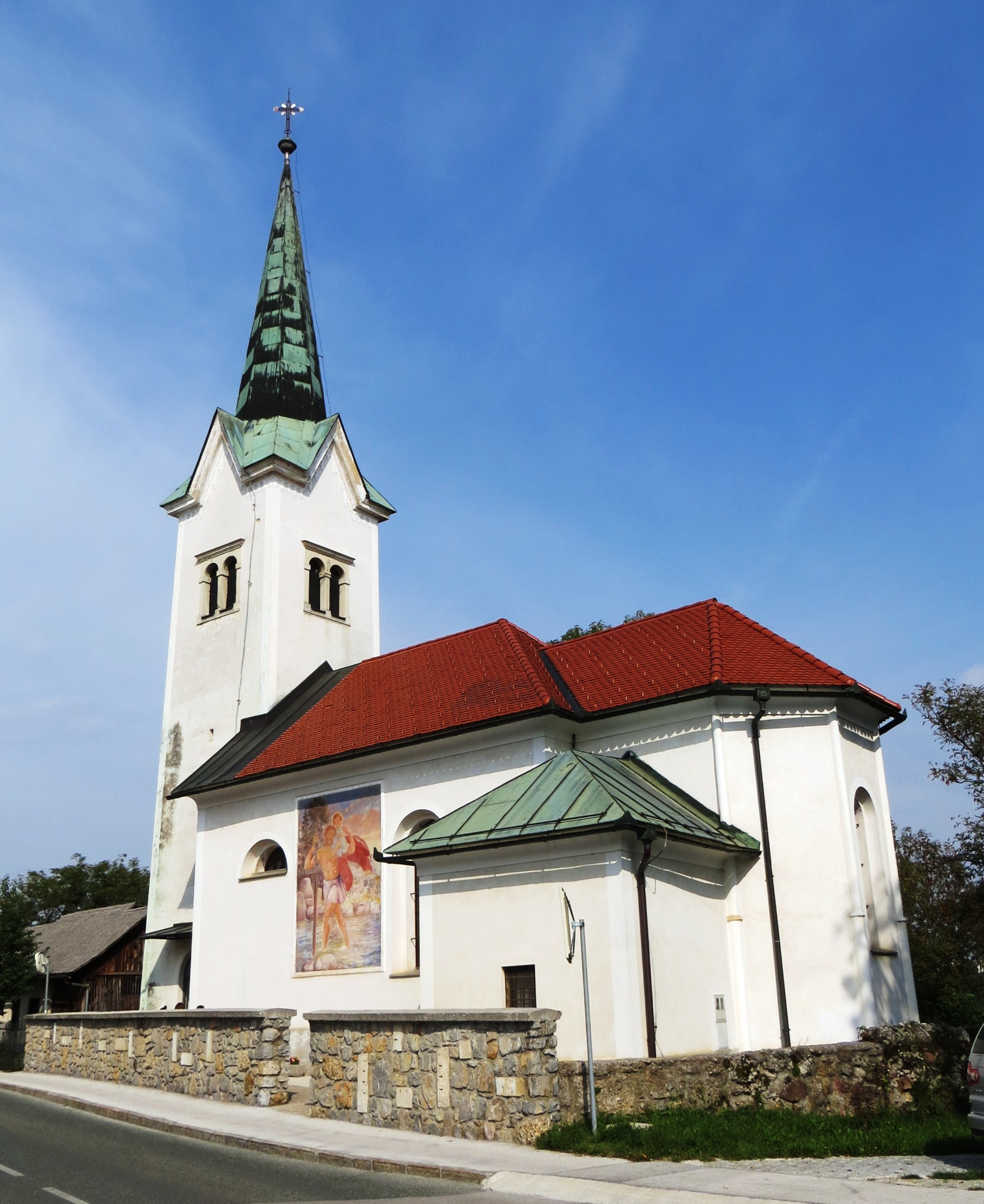
St. Michael's Church

The church in Drulovka is dedicated to Saint Michael (Slovene: sveti Mihael). It is an originally Gothic structure that was remodeled in the Baroque style in the 17th century. The wooden ceiling of the church was removed in 1874. The church contains Stations of the Cross painted by Leopold Layer (1752–1828).
