= Poggersdorf =

Poggersdorf Pokrče
- Municipality
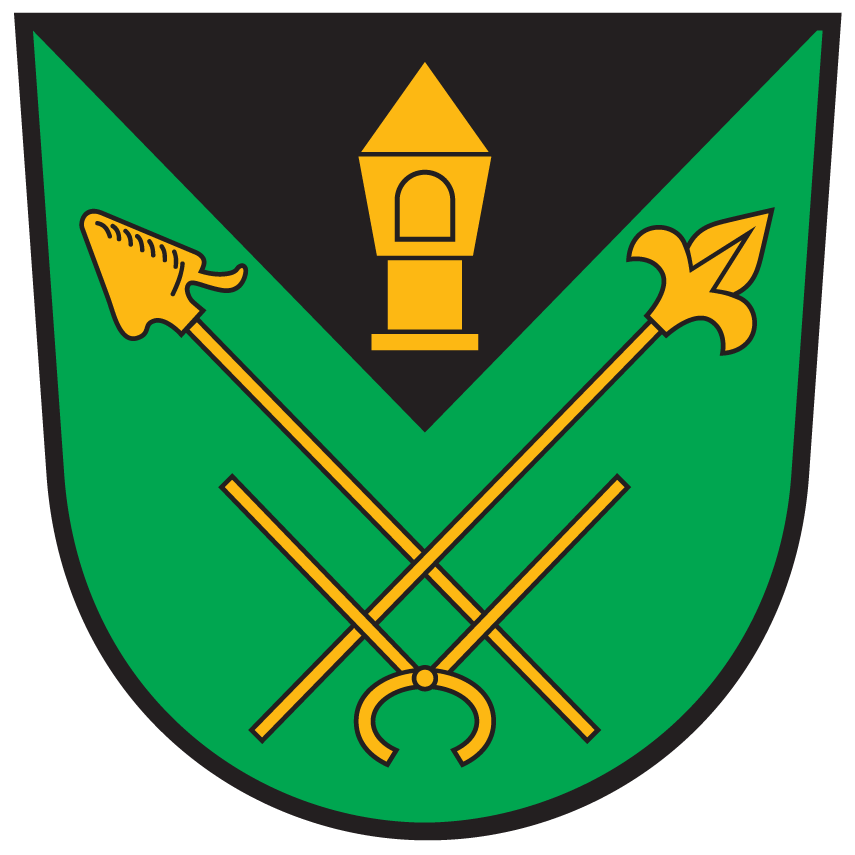
- Coat of arms

- Location within Austria
- Coordinates: 46°39′04″N 14°27′01″E
- Country: Austria
- State: Carinthia
- District: Klagenfurt-Land

Government
  - Mayor: Arnold Marbek

Area
  - Total: 30.74 km^{2} (11.87 sq mi)
- Elevation: 465 m (1,526 ft)

Population (2018-01-01)
  - Total: 3,193
  - Density: 103.9/km^{2} (269.0/sq mi)
- Time zone: UTC+1 (CET)
  - Summer (DST): UTC+2 (CEST)
- Postal code: 9130
- Area code: 04224

Poggersdorf (Austrian German: [ˈpɔɡɐsdɔrf]; Slovenian: Pokrče; Rosen Valley dialect: Poča ves) is a municipality, since 2013 a so-called Market Municipality (German: Marktgemeinde) in the district of Klagenfurt-Land in the Austrian federal state of Carinthia.

== Geography ==
=== Geographic Situation ===
Poggersdorf (in Slovenian Pokrče) lies in the center-east of the Klagenfurt plain (German: Klagenfurter Feld, in Slovenian: Celovško polje), about 10 km east of the regional capital city of Klagenfurt (in Slovenian Celovec). On the north and west, the Gurk (Krka) forms the municipal boundary, and on the south between Gurker Brücke/Muta and Kreuth/Rute, the road to Pack forms the boundary. In 1920, on the occasion of the referendum on the affiliation of southern parts of Carinthia either to Austria or to the newly found State of later Yugoslavia, the river Gurk/Krka represented the boundary of the voting zones A and B (commemoration plaques are set on two bridges), as the zone A, comprising Poggersdorf (Pokrče), was considered being largely Slovenian.

=== Neighbouring Municipalities ===
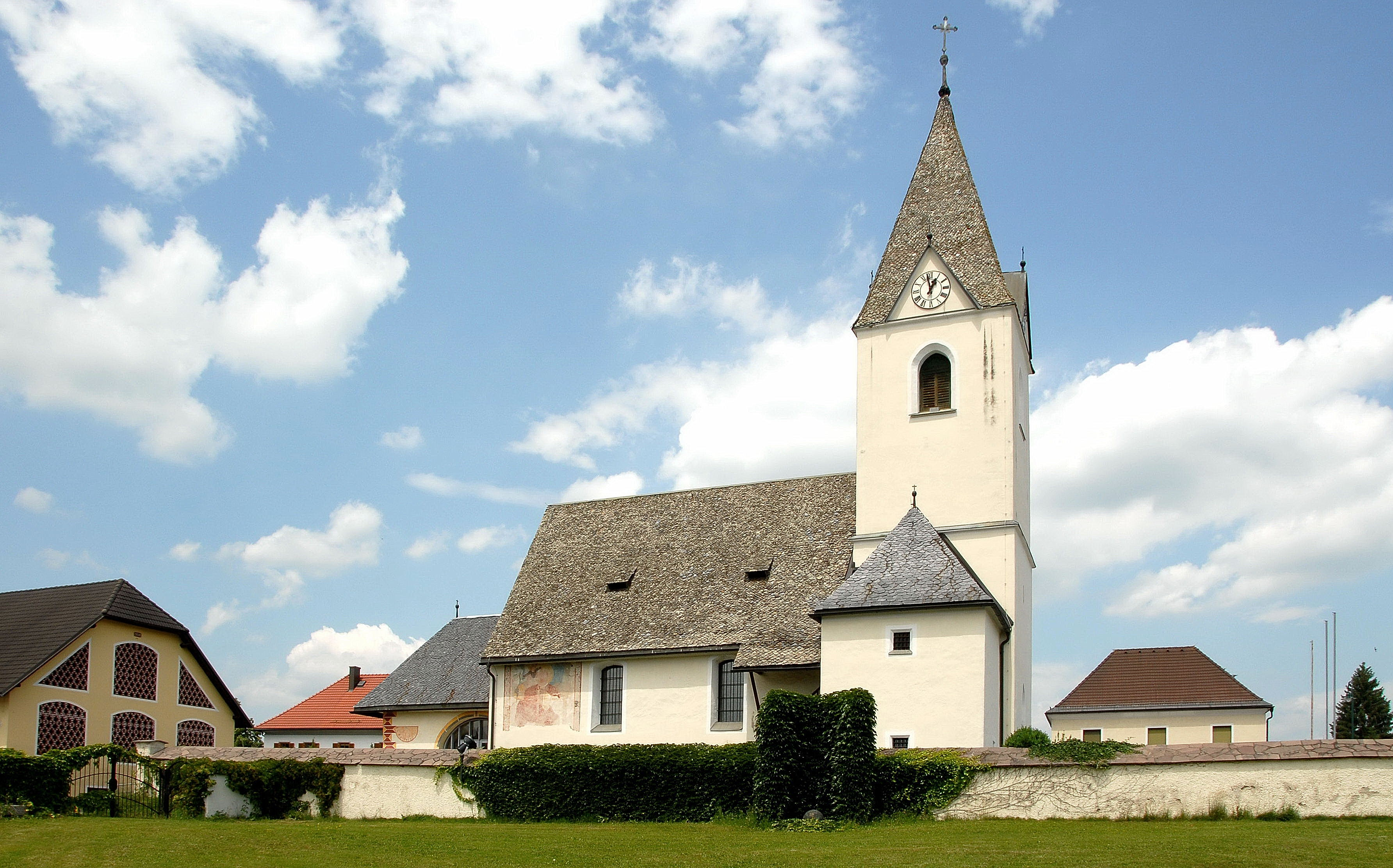
Parish Church of Poggersdorf (Pokrče)

=== Structure of the Municipality ===
The Municipality is composed of four cadastral land register units: Leibsdorf (Ličja vas), Linsenberg (Lečja gora), Pubersdorf (Pobreže) and St. Michael ob der Gurk (Slovenji Šmihel). The Municipality encloses also 24 localities and villages (with their respective Slovenian name that is autochthonous in the region) with, in parentheses, the number of inhabitants on 31. October 2011):

- Ameisbichl / Svamene Gorice (13)
- Annamischl / Mišlje (13)
- Eibelhof / Ovčjak (1)
- Eiersdorf / Virnja vas (107)
- Erlach / Olše (44)
- Goritschach / Goriče (17)
- Haidach / Vresje (27)
- Kreuth / Rute (21)
- Kreuzergegend-Ost / Pri Krajcarju (51)
- Kreuzergegend-West / Pri Krajcarju (53)
- Krobathen / Hrovače (8)
- Lanzendorf / Vanca vas (121)
- Leibsdorf / Ličja vas (611)
- Linsenberg / Lečja Gora (41)
- Pischeldorf / Škofji Dvor (11)
- Poggersdorf / Pokrče (770)
- Pubersdorf / Pobreže (536)
- Rain / Breg (131)
- Raunachmoos / Blato (0)
- Sankt Johann / Čajnža vas (40)
- Sankt Michael ob der Gurk / Slovenji Šmihel (89)
- Ströglach / Stregle (43)
- Wabelsdorf / Vabnja vas (323)
- Wirtschach / Zvirče (11)

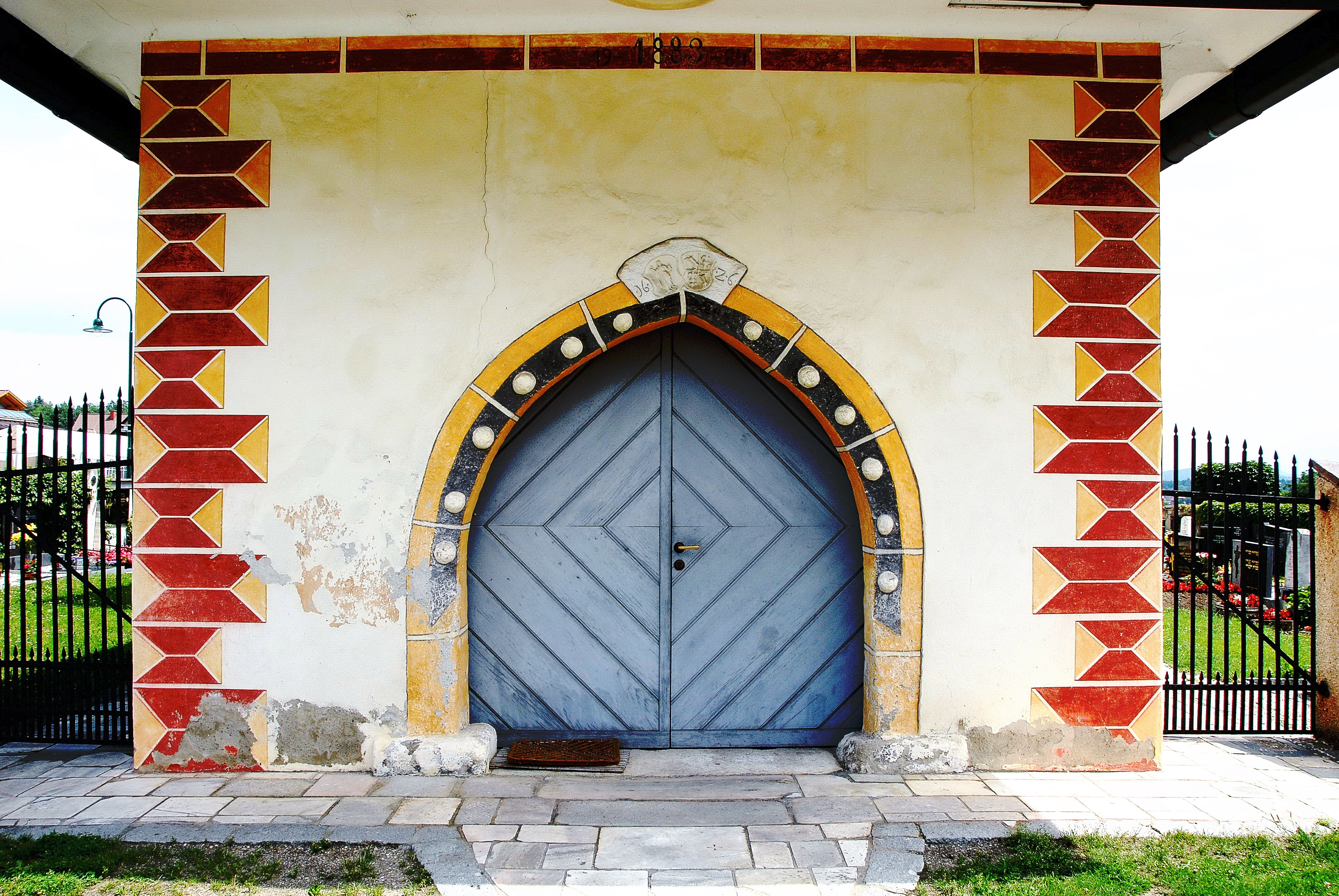
Porticus of the Parish Church of Poggersdorf (Pokrče)

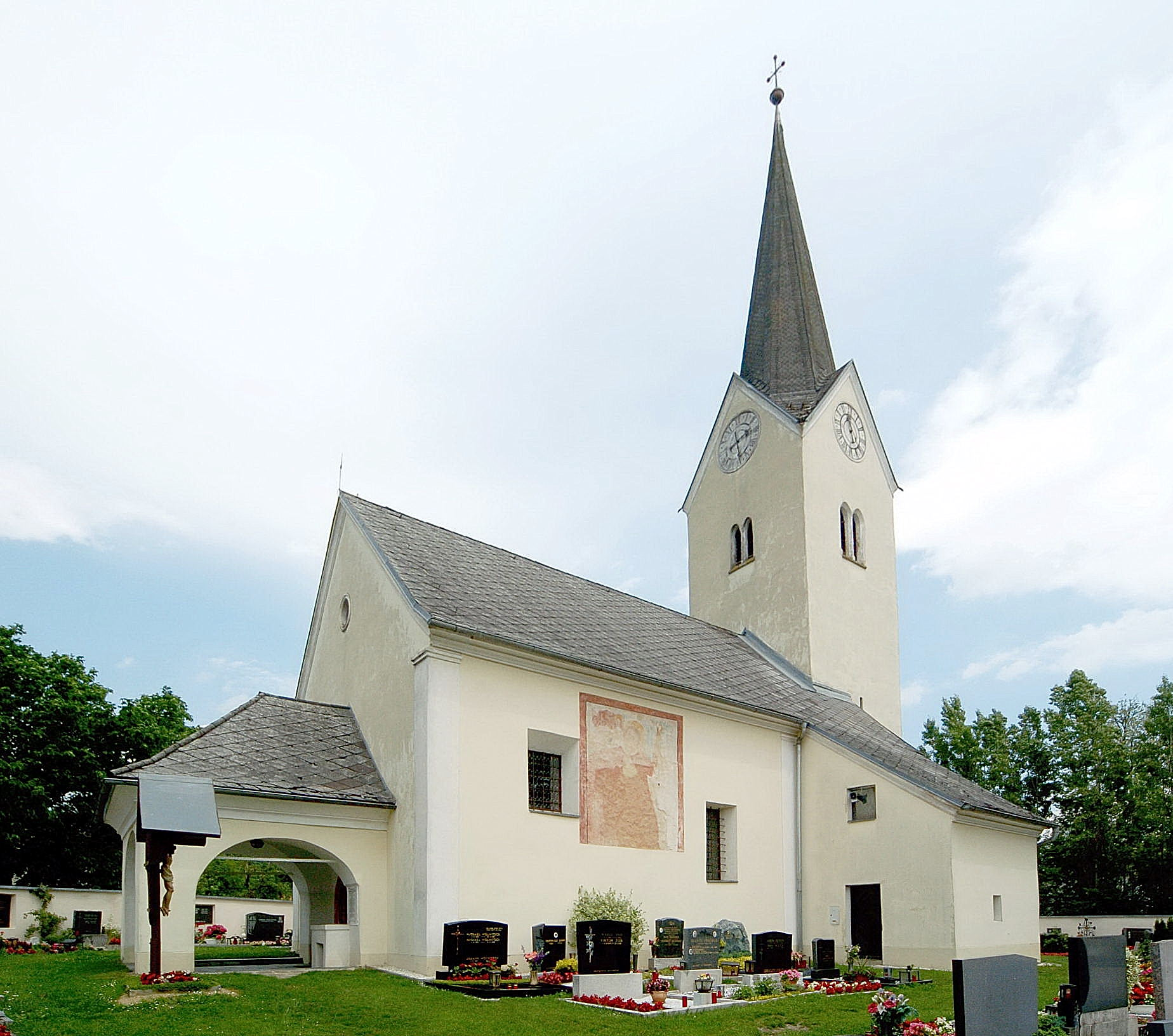
Filial Church of Saint Martin in Leibsdorf (Ličja vas)

== History ==
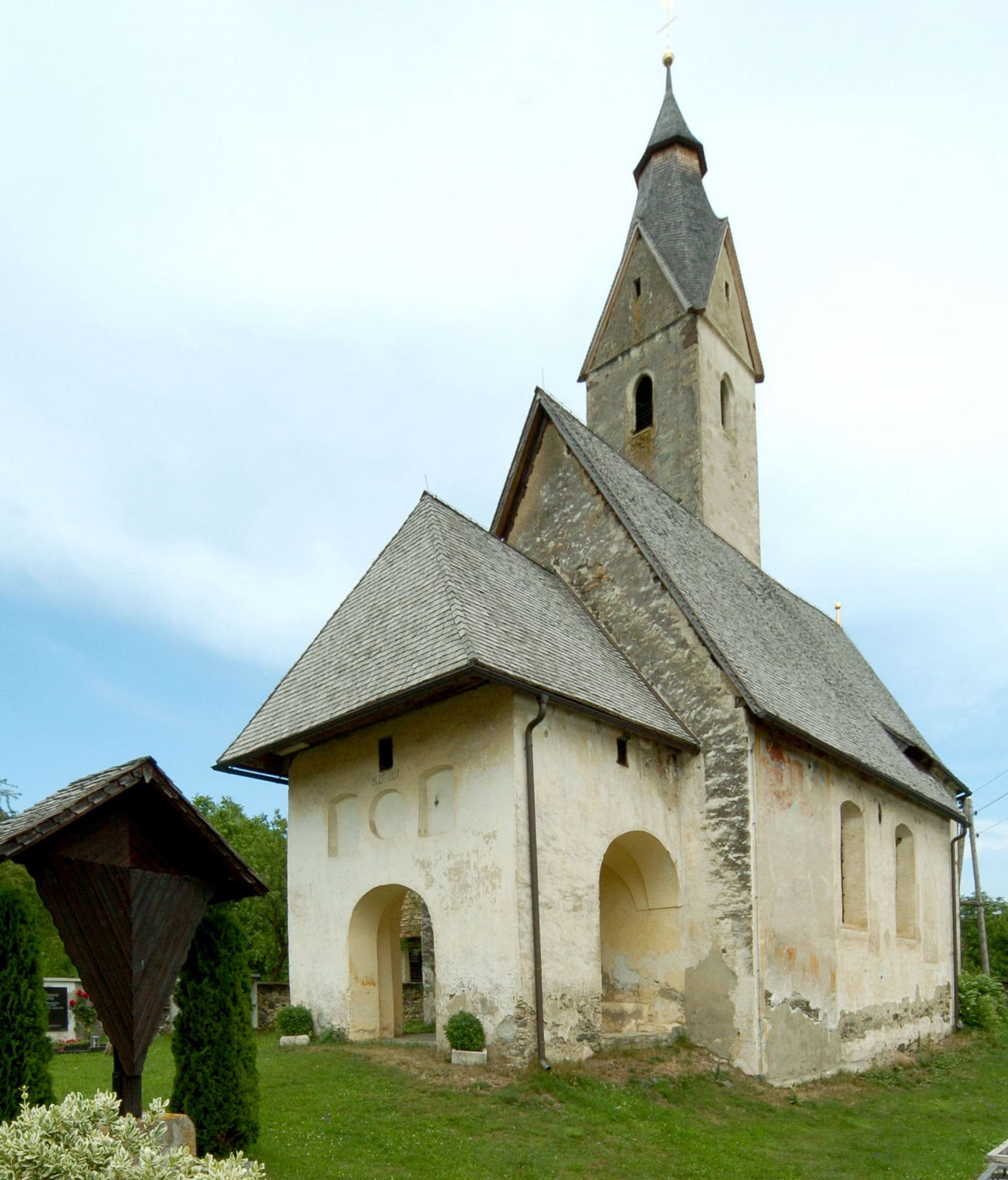
Filial Church of Saint Giles/Aegidius in Linsenberg (Lečja gora)

The eastern part of the Klagenfurt Plain (Klagenfurter Feld / Celovško polje) belonged during history to different centers of power. Until an advanced period of Middle Ages, the ancient Carantanian social group of Slavs respectively Slovenians called the “Edlinger” (in Slovenian “kosezi “) had specific social privileges. It was situated between feudality and farmers and had its own autonomous justice. It is in this tradition that developed for example the lower aristocratic domains of Eibelhof (Ovčjak) or Wutschein (Bučinja vas) which gave their names to the respective cadastral land register units.

The territory of the municipality of Poggersdorf/Pokrče belonged to the higher court of Maria Saal (Gospa Sveta). In the course of the creation of the modern political municipalities in 1850, the municipality of “Windisch St. Michael” (Slovenji Šmihel) was created. For ethnopolitical reasons – the municipality and the whole region were considered as being Slovenian – the municipality was renamed in 1896 and its administrative center was transferred to the village of Poggersdorf/Pokrče that was also nearer to the main regional road. In the course of the administrative reform of 1973, a part of the former municipality of Hörtendorf (Trdnja vas) was attached to it.

In the last population census of the Austro-Hungarian Empire in 1910, about 59% of the population of the municipality of Pokrče (Poggersdorf) declared Slovenian being their language of every day public use, which leads to the conclusion that even a higher part had or considered Slovenian being its mother tongue.

During centuries, the municipality was characterized by agriculture and it is only in the last decades that the phenomenon of commuters to the regional capital city became more and more important. In 2013, the municipality was given the specific status of a “Market Municipality” (German: “Marktgemeinde”).

== Population ==
According to the census of 2001, the population of Poggersdorf is 2.850, 97,8 % have the Austrian nationality and 87,5 % are Catholics, 2,9 % Protestants, 0,7 % Muslims and 6,2 % without religious confession. The Jehovah's Witnesses have a worship center in Leibsdorf (Ličja vas).

The parish church of Poggersdorf ( Pokrče ) as well as its filial churches of Wutschein (Bučinja vas), Wabelsdorf (Vabnja vas) and Eiersdorf (Virnja vas) are formally bilingual (German / Slovenian).

=== Slovenian Dialect and Cultural History ===
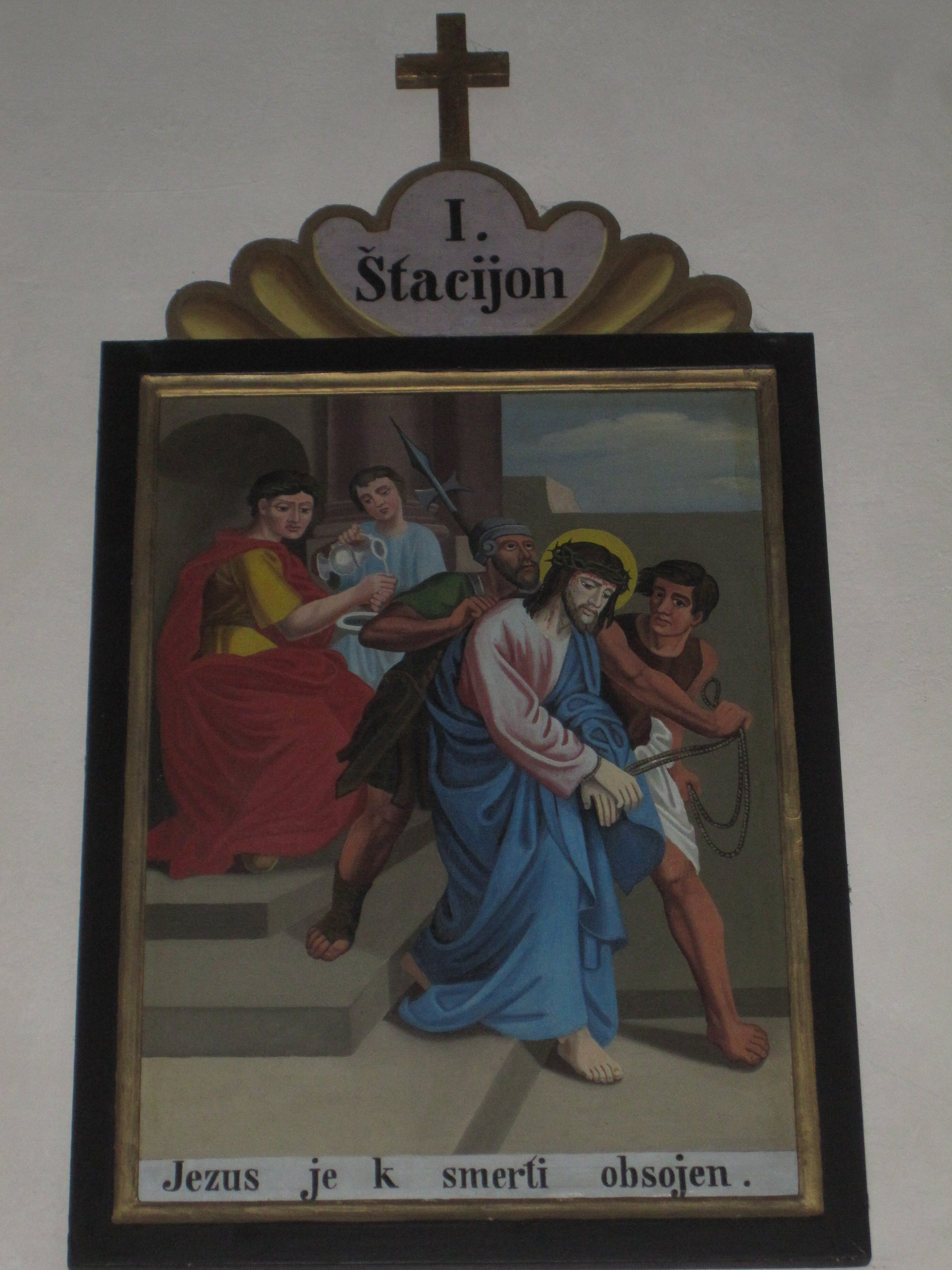
1st Station of the Way of the Cross in Dolina

The Municipality of Poggersdorf/Pokrče is still bilingual with German dominance. Historically however, it belonged to the linguistic area of the autochthonous Slovenian language or dialect of the plain of Klagenfurt (called poljanski govor or poljanščina Celovškega Polja), which is a central dialect respectively of transition of the so-called Slovenian dialect of the valley of Rosental (Rož) (the latter being formally called rožanščina, in German Rosentaler Dialekt) and the dialect of the valley of Jauntal (Podjuna) (respectively the so-called podjunščina, in German Jauntaler Dialekt). The dialect was initially identified and described by Johann Scheinigg in 1882. This was confirmed by on site studies by Katja Sturm-Schnabl in 1973

At the beginning of the 20th century, numerous Slovenian associations under the patronage of the church as well as private were created in order to promote the Slovenian culture and to ensure its respect and legal rights, such as the Cyril and Method-Association. The Association called “Edinost” (“Unity”) of the neighbouring parish of Saint Thomas (see Magdalensberg) also developed their activities.

During the ethnic cleansing of the Nazis and even before the beginning of WW II, any Slovenian activities as well as the use of the language were forbidden and persecuted and people who would speak it were put into camps at the latest in April 1942. After WW II, collective traumatisation and ongoing discriminations made a renewal of the Slovenian culture almost impossible.

== Culture and Sites of Cultural Interest ==
=== Monuments ===
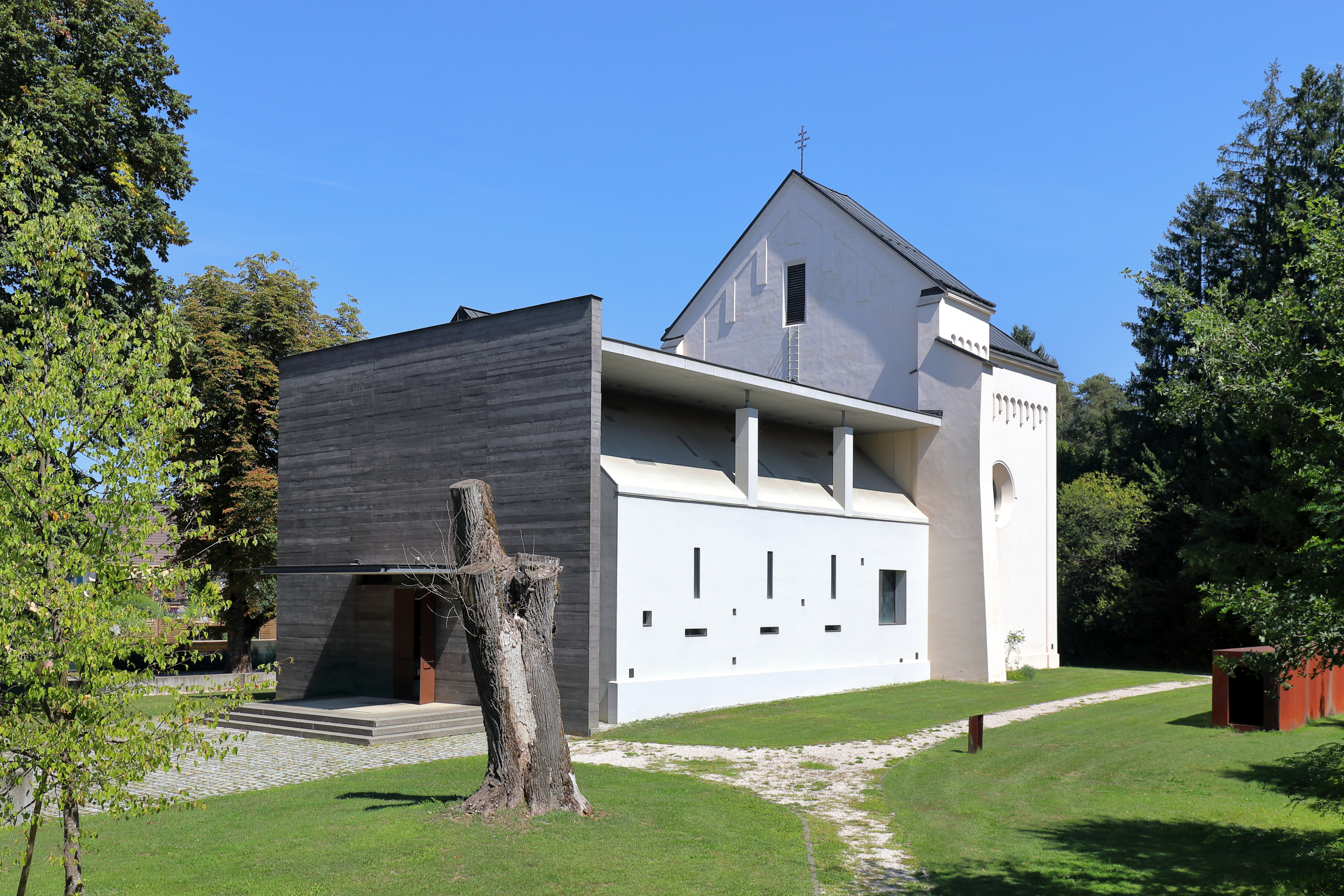
Dolina

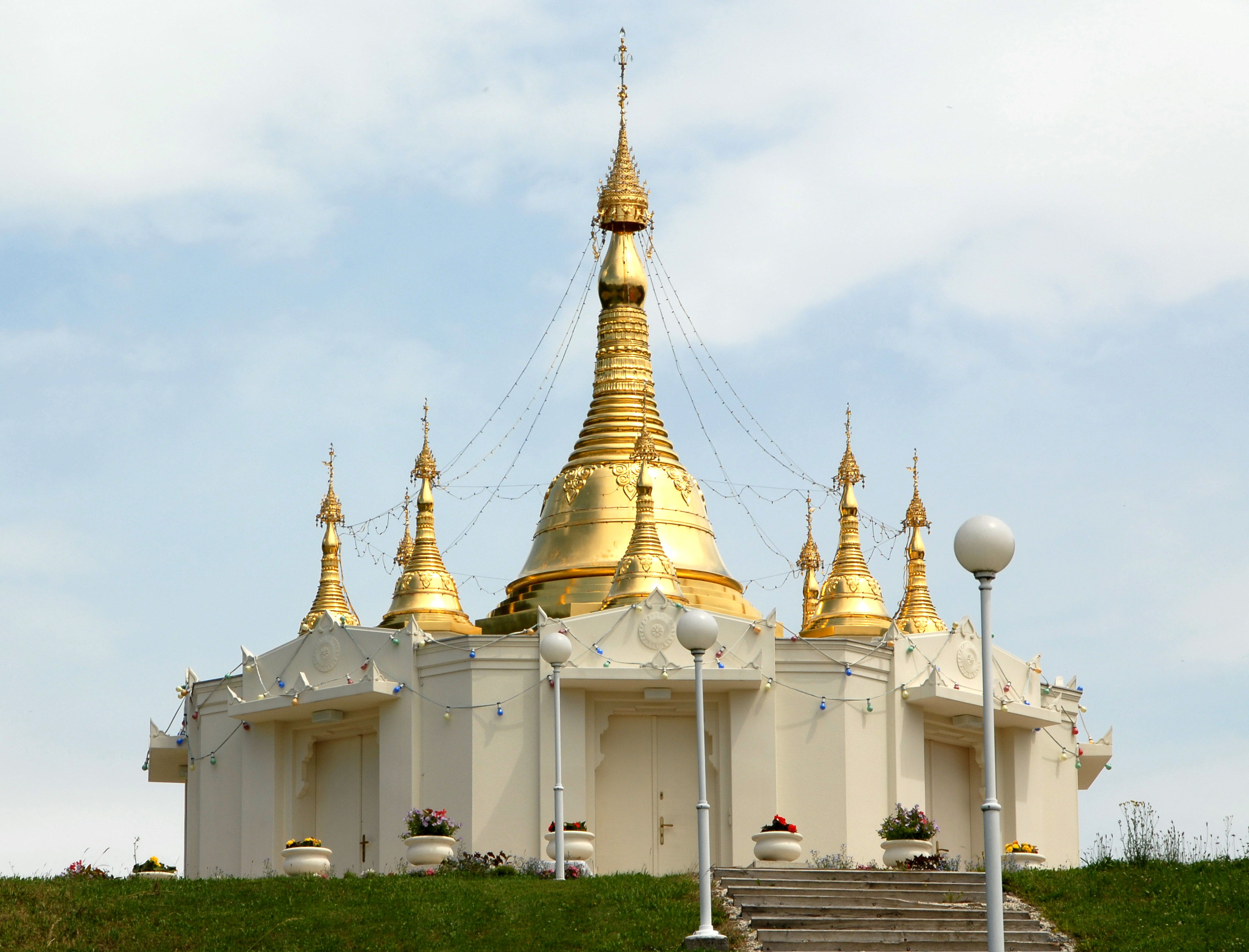
International Meditation Center in Austria in Sankt Michael ob der Gurk (Slovenski Šmihel)

- Mannor Rain
- Parish church of Sankt Michael ob der Gurk (Slovenji Šmihel)
- Parish church of Poggersdorf (Pokrče) (bilingual), (with a Way of the Cross (via crucis) with Slovenian inscriptions)
  - The parish of Poggerdorf/Pokrče encloses also the filial church of Dolina (in Slovenian also Dolina which means precisely in Slovenian (valley) in the neighboring municipality of Grafenstein (Grabštanj). It is a regional bilingual center of pilgrimage to Saint Mary with characteristics very similar to Fátima in Portugal, but anterior to it. In 1849, five young girls which spoke exclusively Slovenian (in Fatima there were 3 children) had a vision of Saint Mary on a tree respectively on a stump (in Fatima it was on a tree) in the forest of Dolina. This was the origin of the veneration of Saint Mary that was promoted with enthusiasm by local and regional Slovenian inhabitants that gained a new dynamics with the construction of the church in 1860/61. After the reconstruction in the year 2000 during the construction of the highway A2, the present situation is a synthesis of the ancient apse and the chancel with the most modern nave that kept its Way of the Cross (via crucis) with Slovenian inscriptions as well as with multilingual inscriptions, including Slovenian ones, which can be seen as a positive sign of change in regards to the inter-ethnic dialogue in the region.
- Filial church of Wutschein (Bučinja vas) (bilingual)
- Filial church of Wabelsdorf (Vabnja vas) (bilingual)
- Filial church of Eiersdorf (Virnja vas) (bilingual)
- Filial church of Linsenberg (Lečja gora) (with a Way of the Cross (via crucis) with Slovenian inscriptions) as well as with a commemorating plaque for the fallen of WW I in Slovenian)
- Filial church of Leibsdorf (Ličja vas)
- Hydroelectric power station of Rain (Breg) (neo-classicism)
- International Meditation Center in Austria in Sankt Michael ob der Gurk (Slovenski Šmihel)
- Kreuzerhof
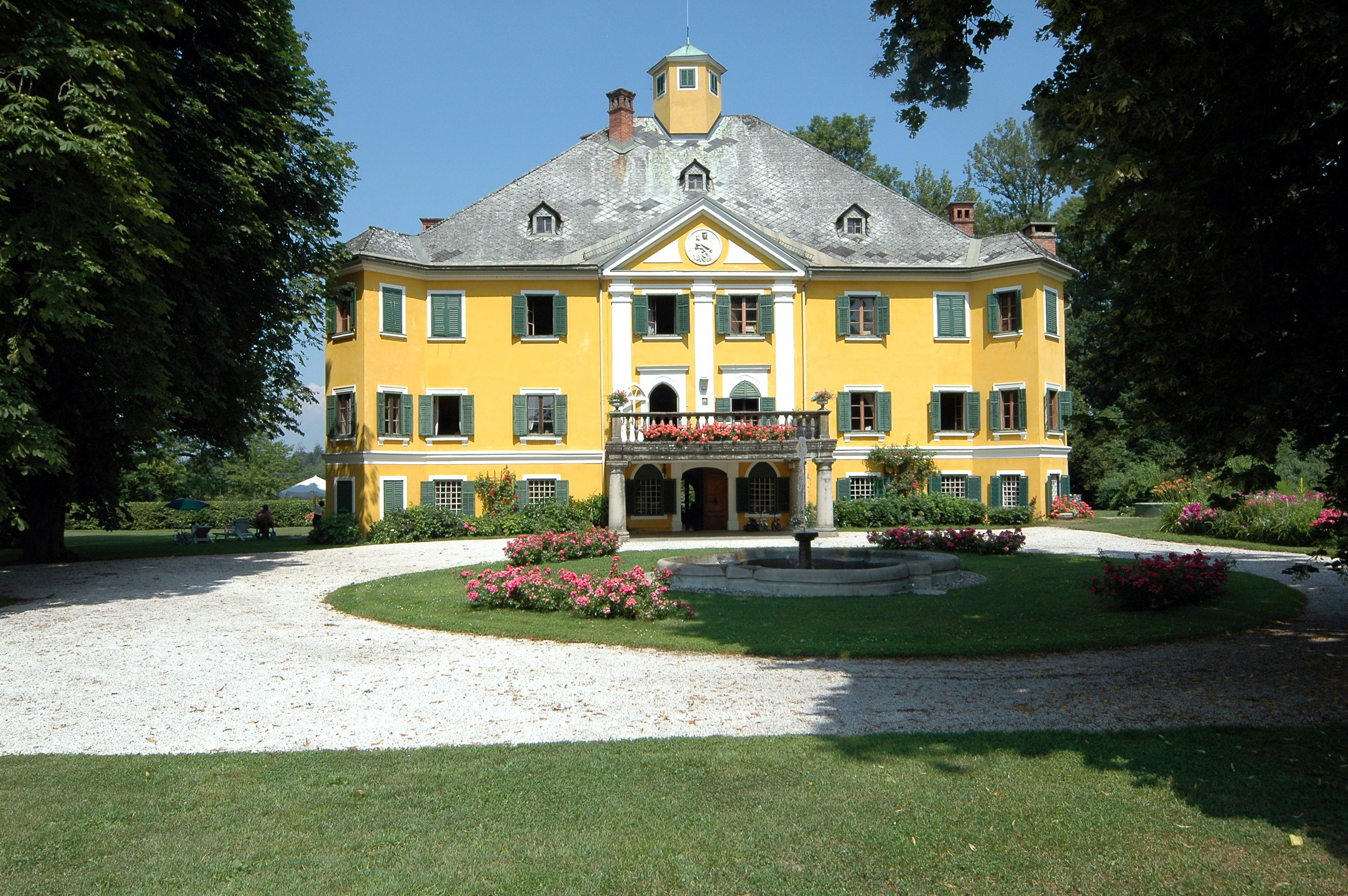
Mannor Rain (Breg)

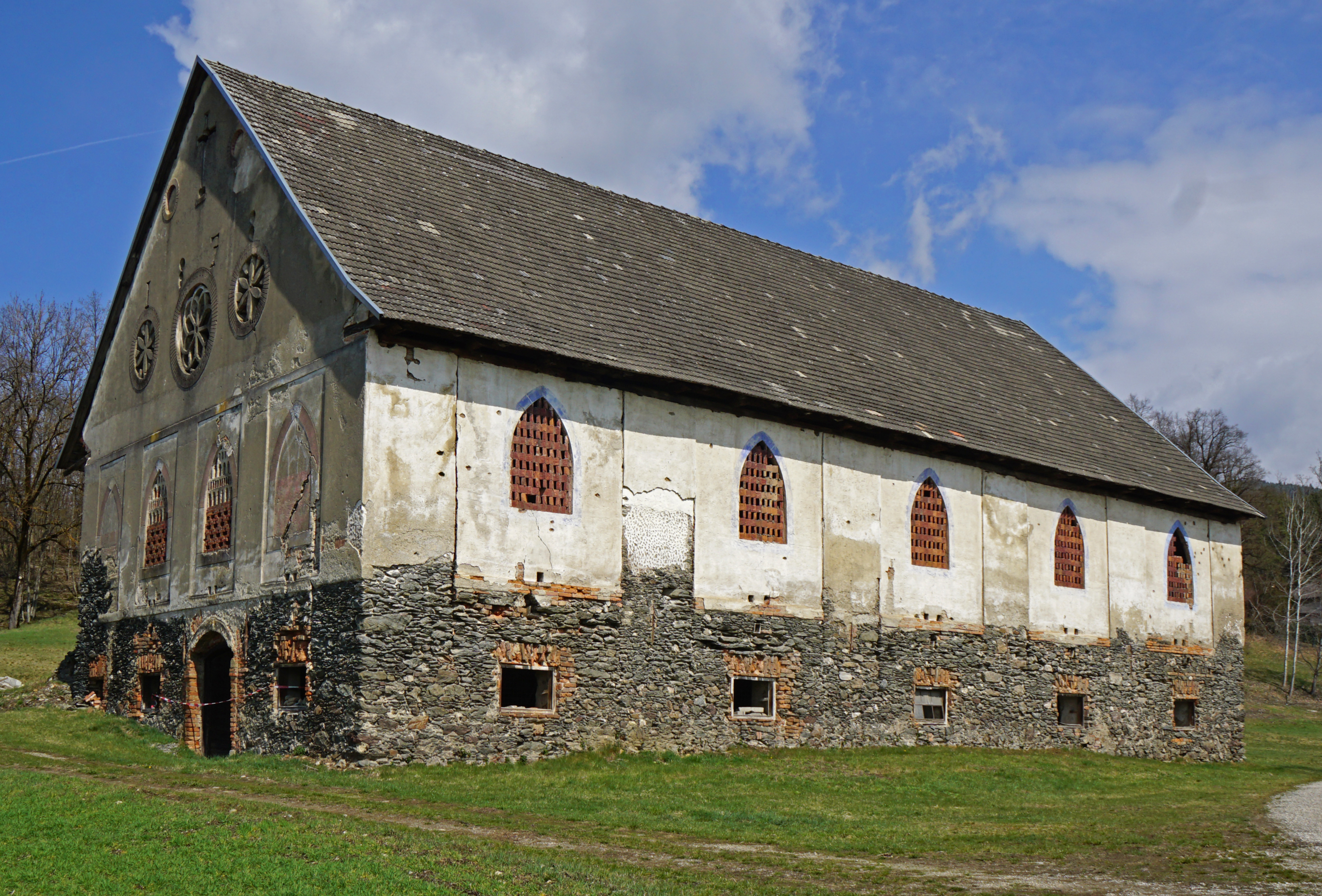
Kreuzerhof, view from south-west

=== Primary school ===
Poggersdorf/Pokrče has a primary school center and pre-elementary education in the municipal center as well as an elementary school in Waberlsdorf (Vabnja vas) which is categorized as being bilingual in respect of the ethnic minority rights.

=== Coat of Arms ===
The coat of arms of Poggersdorf/Pokrče has the form of an escutcheon with green background as a symbol of the agricultural nature of the municipality. The black peak is heads down symbolizing the local industry (Notburgahütte) as well the extraction of peat (turf) in the location of Raunachmoss (Blato). The religious monument, a wayside shrine, is characteristic for the whole region and can be found in Wabelsdorf (Vabnja vas), Eisersdorf (Virnja vas) in Linsenberg (Lečja gora) as well as in Raunachmoos (Blato). The lance and the shepherds’ stick symbolize the right of possession of arms and the rural culture of the so-called “Edlinger” (“kosezi”) of the times of medieval Carantania, which have kept their privileges much longer. The pincer symbolizes the mining activity in the Notburgahütte.

The blazon and the flag were conferred on 13. February 1996. The flag is green and yellow and contains the blazon.

== Politics ==
=== Municipal Council and Mayor ===
The municipal council (Gemeinderat) consists of 23 members. Following the 2021 Carinthian local elections, the seat distribution is as follows:

- Social Democratic Party of Austria (SPÖ): 14 seats
- Austrian People's Party (ÖVP): 9 seats

The mayor of Poggersdorf, Arnold Marbek (SPÖ), was re-elected in 2021.

== Literature ==
- Chronik der Marktgemeinde Poggersdorf, ed. par: Marktgemeinde Poggerdsorf, réd. Renate Jernej. Klagenfurt, Johannes Heyn éd., 2014, ISBN 978-3-7084-0539-1.
- Johann Scheinigg, Die Assimilation im Rosenthaler Dialekt, Ein Beitrag zur Kärntner-Slovenischen Dialektforschung. Erschienen in XXXII Programm des k.k. Staatsgymnasium zu Klagenfurt 1882.
- Katja Sturm-Schnabl: Kulturno življenje v fari Št. Tomaž od začetka 20. stoletja do nemške okupacije. V: Koroški koledar 2009, Drava, Klagenfurt/Celovec 2008, S. 139-156.
- Katja Sturm-Schnabl, Slovensko narečje v funkciji komunikacijskega sredstva za tuje prisilne delavce v letih 1938 – 1945 v političnem okraju Celovec. Dokumentacija o slovenskem življu do druge svetovne vojne. V: Obdobja 26 – Metode in zvrsti. Slovenska narečja med sistemom in rabo. Ljubljana 2009, p. 371 – 391.
- M. Mitrović: Geschichte der slowenischen Literatur, Von den Anfängen bis zur Gegenwart, Aus dem Serbokroatischen übersetzt, redaktionell bearbeitet und mit ausgewählten Lemmata und Anmerkungen ergänzt von Katja Sturm-Schnabl, Hermagoras, Klagenfurt / Celovec 2001.
- K. Sturm-Schnabl, Die slovenischen Mundarten und Mundartreste im Klagenfurter Becken : Phil. Diss. Wien : [S. K. Sturm-Schnabl], 1973, 287 p.
- Pavel Zdovc, Slovenska krajevna imena na avstrijskem Koroškem, razširjena izdaja. Sie slowenischen Ortsnamen in Kärnten, erweiterte Auflage, Slovenska akademija znanosti in umetnosti, Razred za filološke in literarne vede, Ljubljana 2010, ISSN 0560-2920.
