= Ferlach =

Ferlach Borovlje
- Municipality
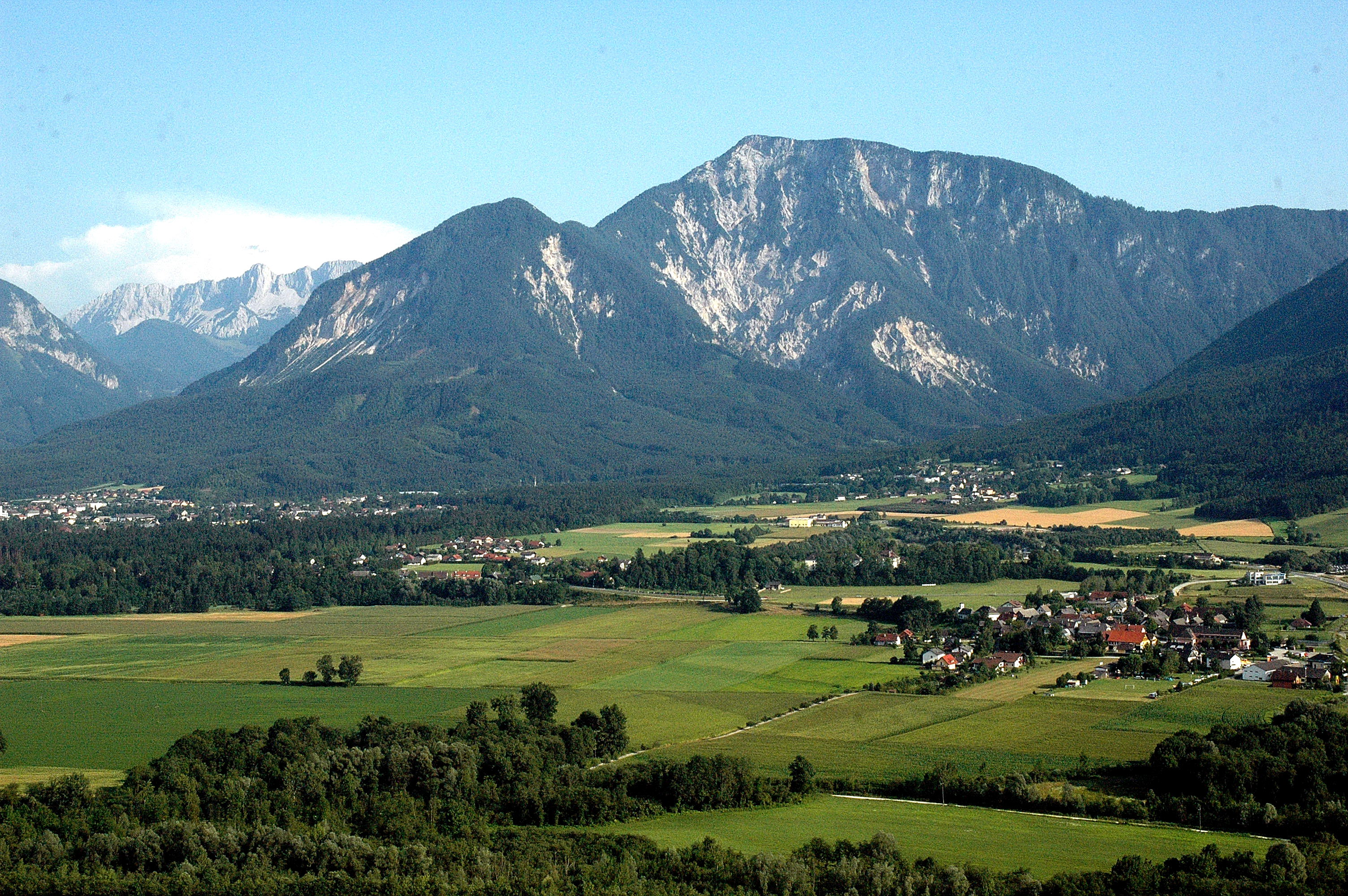

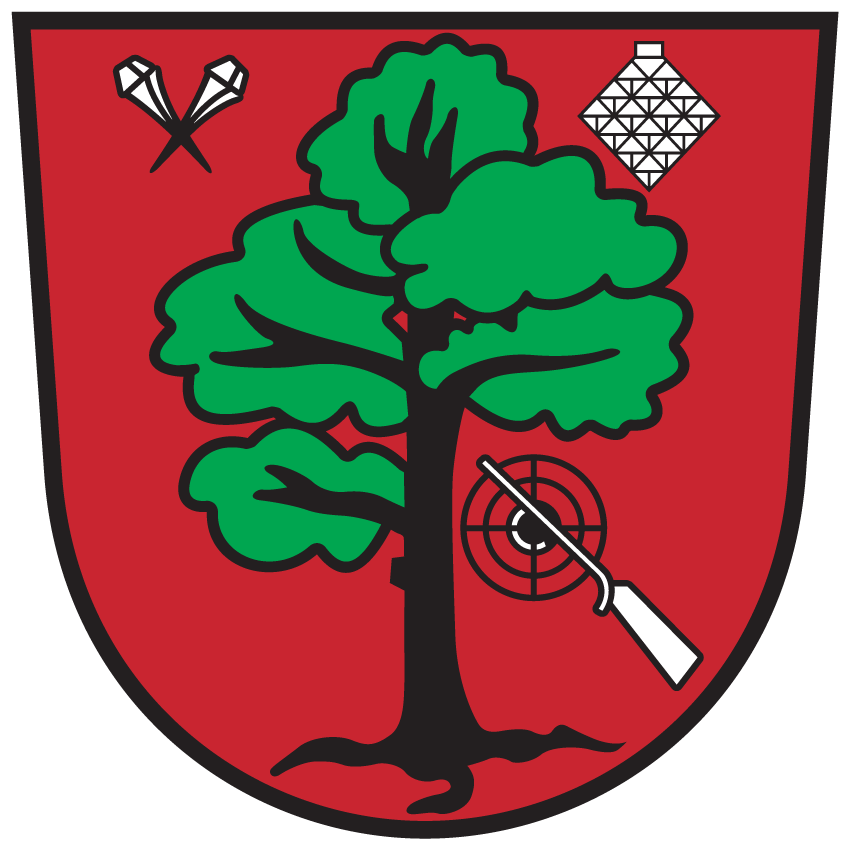
- Coat of arms

- Location within Austria Ferlach (Austria)
- Coordinates: 46°32′N 14°18′E
- Country: Austria
- State: Carinthia
- District: Klagenfurt-Land

Government
  - Mayor: Ingo Appé (SPÖ)

Area
  - Total: 117.21 km^{2} (45.26 sq mi)
- Elevation: 466 m (1,529 ft)

Population (2018-01-01)
  - Total: 7,141
  - Density: 60.92/km^{2} (157.8/sq mi)
- Time zone: UTC+1 (CET)
  - Summer (DST): UTC+2 (CEST)
- Postal code: 9170
- Area code: 04227
- Website: www.ferlach.at

Ferlach (Slovene: Borovlje) in the district of Klagenfurt-Land in Carinthia is the southernmost town in Austria. It is known for its centuries-old gunsmith tradition, part of the Austrian intangible cultural heritage since 2010.

== Geography ==
It is situated in the Rosental/Rož Valley of the Drava River, about 17 kilometres (11 mi) south of the Carinthian state capital Klagenfurt. In the south, the crest of the Karawanks mountain range forms the border with Slovenia. The municipal area comprises the cadastral communities of Ferlach (Borovlje), Kappel an der Drau (Kapla ob Dravi), Kirschentheuer (Kožentavra), Unterloibl (Podljubelj), Waidisch (Bajdiše), Unterferlach (Medborovnica), Glainach (Glinje), Seidolach (Ždovlje), and Windisch Bleiberg (Slovenji Plajberg).

The town centre lies at the junction of the Rosental Straße (B85) highway with Loiblpass Straße (B91), part of the European route E652, running from Klagenfurt to Tržič in Slovenia via Loibl Pass. The Ferlach Railway line from Weizelsdorf went out of service in 1951, but on summer weekends and special occasions a heritage railway service, the Rosentaler Dampfzug runs as far as Weizelsdorf, operated by the preservation group Nostalgiebahnen in Kärnten.

== History ==
Ferlach was first mentioned as Vörelach in a 1246 deed, named after the surrounding pine (Föhre, bor in Slovene) forests. The mountainous area is the site of large iron ore deposits, ironworks and forging is documented since the 15th century.

The relocation of the capital of the Duchy of Carinthia to nearby Klagenfurt under the rule of King Maximilian I about 1518 decisively promoted the development of Ferlach as a centre of firearm manufacturing. Under Empress Maria Theresa, its gunsmiths became the main armorers of the Habsburg monarchy. Ferlach firearms were also used by the Spanish, French and Turkish armies.

The present-day municipality was established as Oberferlach in 1850. Ferlach received town privileges in 1930 and today is a centre for the production of hunting rifles. The history of the town is depicted in its coat of arms: it features a pine tree with a cone, two crossed silver nails, and a rifle.

== Population ==
According to the 2011 census has Ferlach 7.272 inhabitants. 8.0% of the population are Carinthian Slovenes.

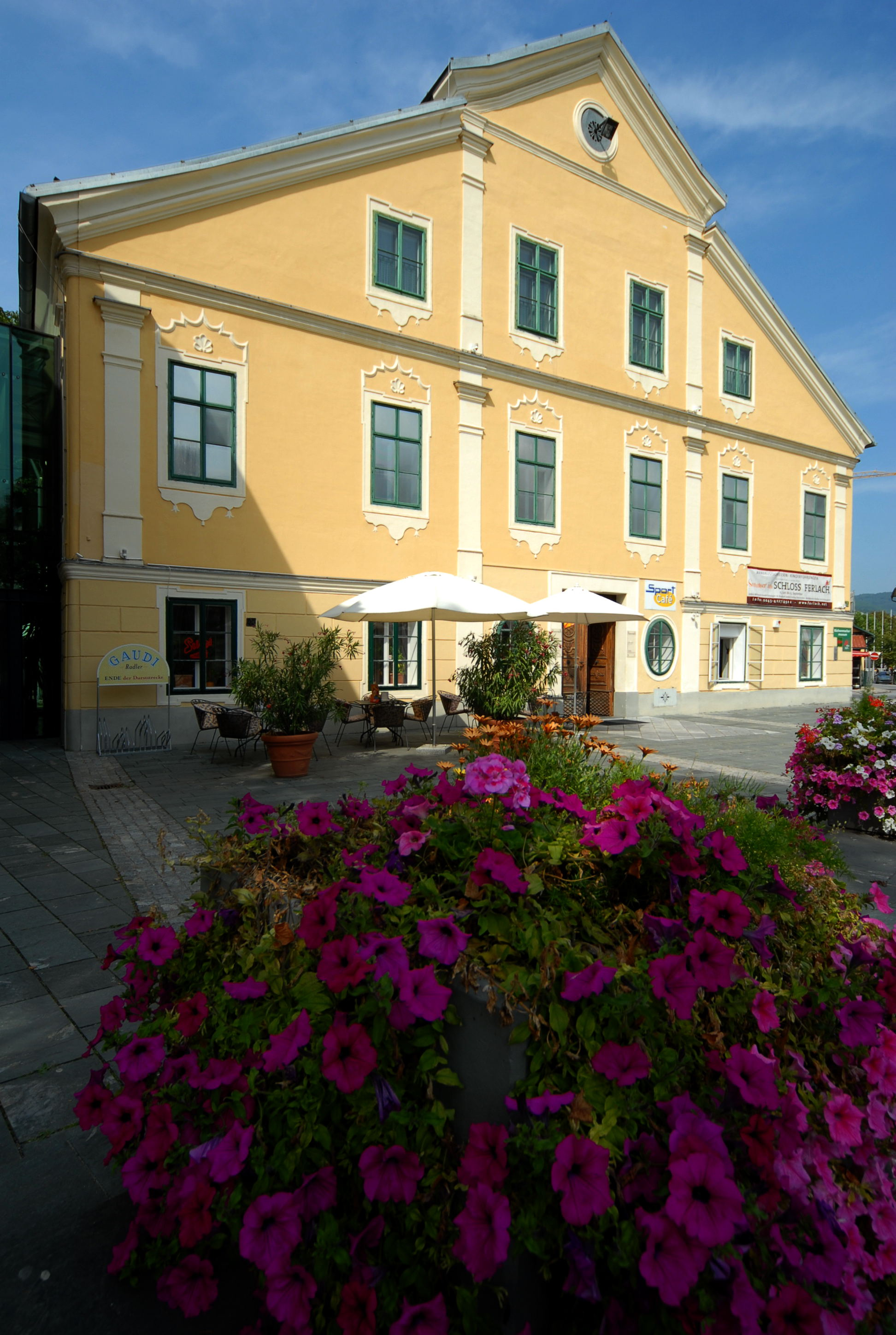
Ferlach Castle

Village	Number of people 1991	Percent of Slovenes 1991	Percent of Slovenes 1951
Bodental/Poden	115	53.9%	83.3%
Loibltal/Brodi	70	51.4%	68.2%
Strugarjach/Strugarje	18	61.6%	94.1%
W.Bleiberg/Slovenji Plajberk	124	66.9%	87.3%
Waidisch/Bajdiše	93	37.6%	44.5%
Glainach/Glinje	114	12.3%	84.7%
Kappel a.D./Kapla ob Dravi	262	6.5%	30.3%
Tratten/Trata	82	15.9%	41.4%
Unterglainach/Vesca	32	37.5%	100%
Laak/Loka	41	14.6%	100%
Seidolach/Ždovlje	87	18.4%	74.5%
Dörfl/Kajže	18	55.6%	79.4%
Singerberg/Žingarica	9	11.1%	100%
Rauth/Rute	11	9.1%	100%
Görtschach/Goriče	230	8.8%	13.7%
Reßnig/Resnica	212	7.1%	44.8%
Kirschentheuer/Kožentavra	252	7.9%	45.6%
Otrouza/Otrovca	71	5.6%	41.0%
Strau/Struga	222	5.0%	28.5%
Unterloibl/Podljubelj	240	8.3%	22.1%

== Climate ==
Climate data for Ferlach
Month	Jan	Feb	Mar	Apr	May	Jun	Jul	Aug	Sep	Oct	Nov	Dec	Year
Record high °C (°F)	13.8 (56.8)	21.8 (71.2)	24.8 (76.6)	27.0 (80.6)	31.4 (88.5)	32.8 (91.0)	36.5 (97.7)	36.0 (96.8)	31.0 (87.8)	26.2 (79.2)	18.8 (65.8)	17.8 (64.0)	36.5 (97.7)
Mean daily maximum °C (°F)	0.9 (33.6)	5.0 (41.0)	10.8 (51.4)	15.3 (59.5)	20.6 (69.1)	23.7 (74.7)	25.9 (78.6)	25.6 (78.1)	20.9 (69.6)	14.6 (58.3)	6.3 (43.3)	1.3 (34.3)	14.2 (57.6)
Daily mean °C (°F)	−4.0 (24.8)	−1.4 (29.5)	3.5 (38.3)	8.2 (46.8)	13.5 (56.3)	16.7 (62.1)	18.6 (65.5)	18.1 (64.6)	13.7 (56.7)	8.2 (46.8)	1.7 (35.1)	−2.7 (27.1)	7.8 (46.0)
Mean daily minimum °C (°F)	−7.1 (19.2)	−5.4 (22.3)	−1.4 (29.5)	2.5 (36.5)	7.2 (45.0)	10.7 (51.3)	12.5 (54.5)	12.3 (54.1)	8.6 (47.5)	4.3 (39.7)	−1.1 (30.0)	−5.2 (22.6)	3.2 (37.7)
Record low °C (°F)	−24.3 (−11.7)	−24.1 (−11.4)	−16.7 (1.9)	−6.0 (21.2)	−2.6 (27.3)	2.0 (35.6)	3.7 (38.7)	3.5 (38.3)	−1.4 (29.5)	−10.6 (12.9)	−15.0 (5.0)	−19.6 (−3.3)	−24.3 (−11.7)
Average rainfall mm (inches)	51.9 (2.04)	50.4 (1.98)	70.3 (2.77)	99.1 (3.90)	104.0 (4.09)	134.0 (5.28)	137.0 (5.39)	120.1 (4.73)	122.6 (4.83)	118.0 (4.65)	114.7 (4.52)	80.0 (3.15)	1,202.1 (47.33)
Average snowfall cm (inches)	28.9 (11.4)	33.7 (13.3)	19.1 (7.5)	10.8 (4.3)	0.2 (0.1)	0.0 (0.0)	0.0 (0.0)	0.0 (0.0)	0.0 (0.0)	0.8 (0.3)	13.8 (5.4)	29.2 (11.5)	136.5 (53.7)
Average rainy days (≥ 1.0 mm)	5.8	5.1	7.5	9.3	11.4	12.0	11.4	9.8	8.5	8.3	7.8	6.8	103.7
Average snowy days (≥ 1.0 cm)	26.1	21.4	12.9	1.8	0.2	0.0	0.0	0.0	0.0	0.2	5.9	19.8	88.3
Mean monthly sunshine hours	78.8	123.0	158.3	175.2	212.5	217.5	241.2	233.0	180.5	125.6	66.0	57.4	1,869

== Politics ==
Seats in the municipal assembly (Gemeinderat) as of 2021 local elections:

- Social Democratic Party of Austria (SPÖ): 16
- Austrian People's Party (ÖVP): 4
- Enotna lista/Volilna skupnost: 3
- Freedom Party of Austria (FPÖ): 3
- The Greens – The Green Alternative: 1

== Notable people ==
- Odo Josef Struger (1931–1998), engineer
- Wolfgang Petritsch (born 1947), diplomat, honorary citizen
