= Burgruine Greifenfels =

Castle ruin in Austria

Coordinates: 46.5983°N 14.3722°E

- Carinthia, Austria
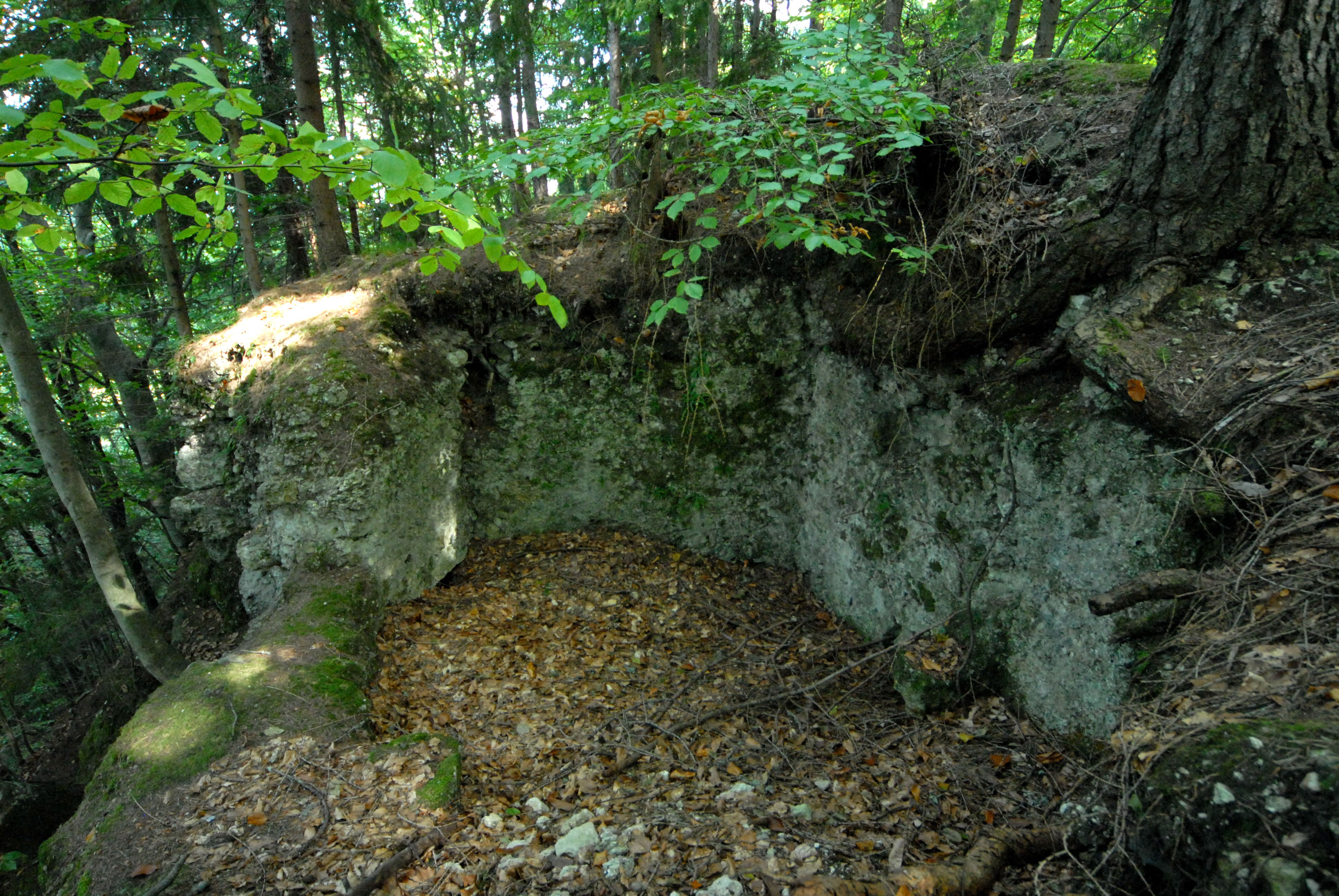
- Greifenfels Castle ruins near Ebenthal

Site information
- Type: Castle

Burgruine Greifenfels is a castle in Carinthia, Austria near Ebenthal.

== See also ==
- List of castles in Austria
