= Maria Rain =

- Municipality
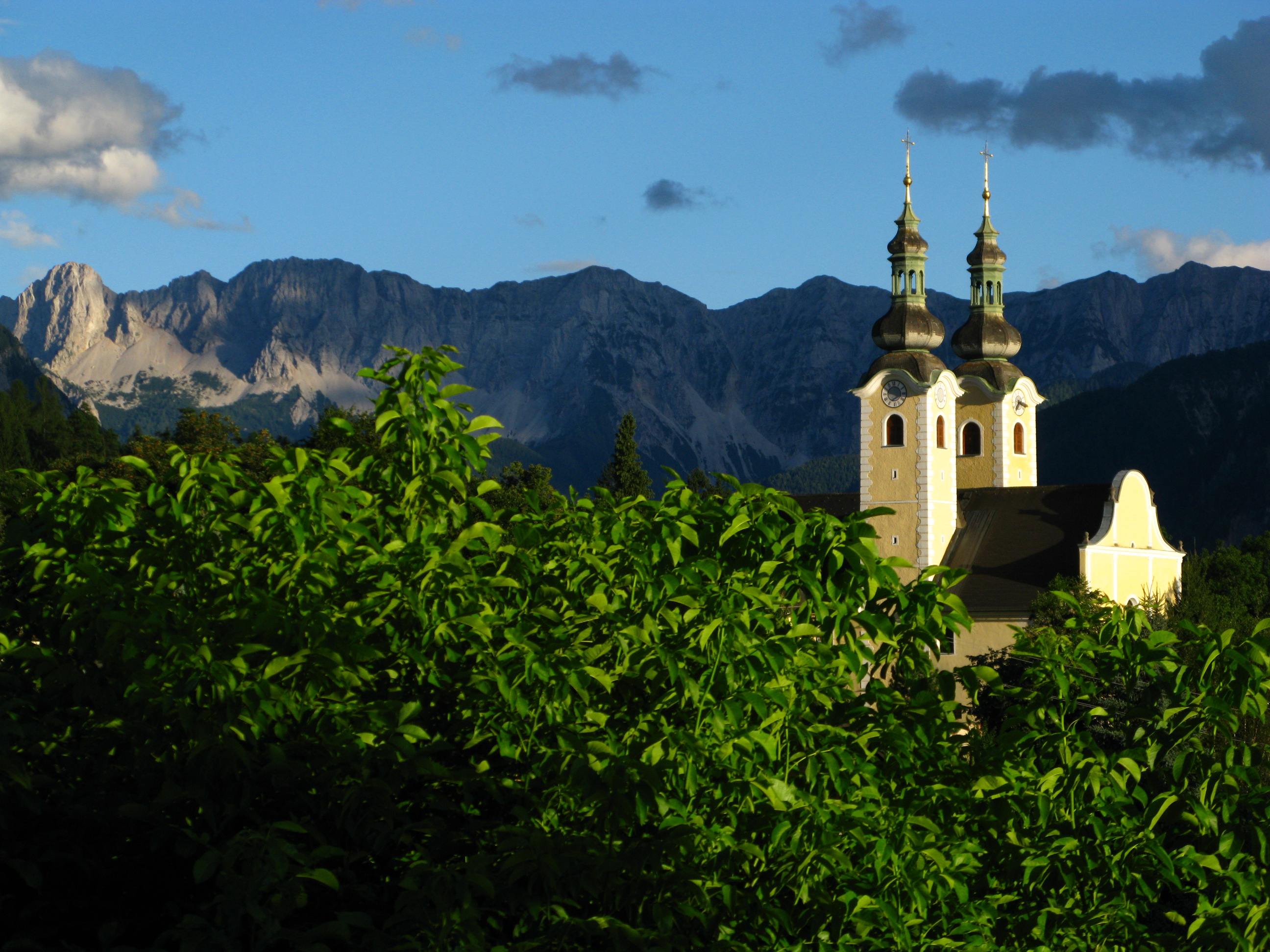
- View with parish church

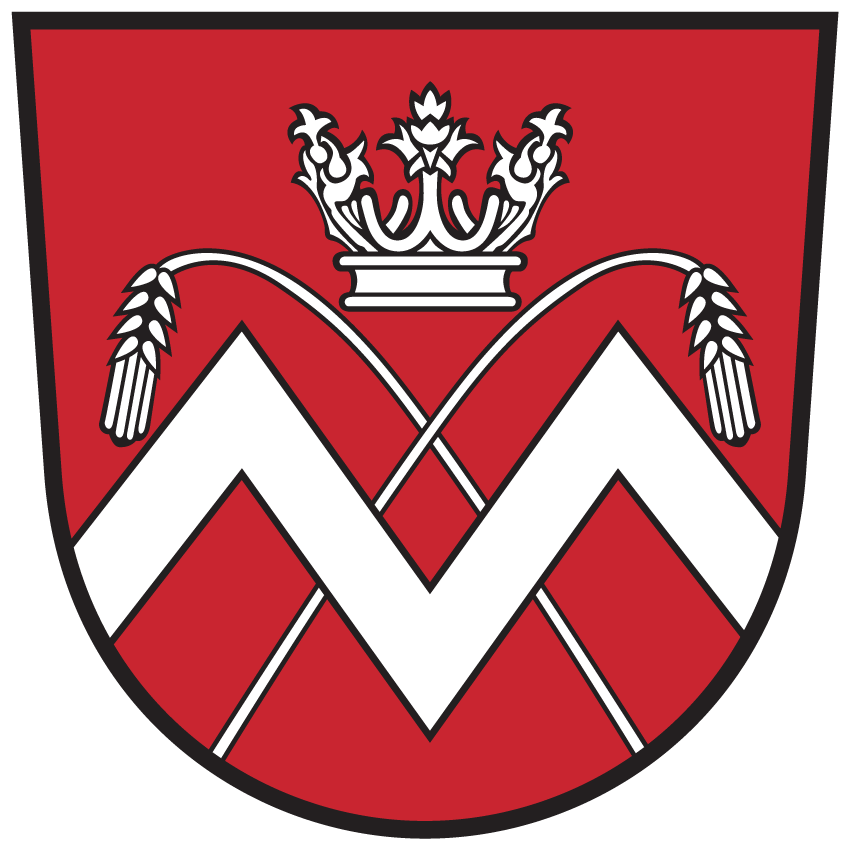
- Coat of arms

- Location within Austria
- Coordinates: 46°33′N 14°18′E
- Country: Austria
- State: Carinthia
- District: Klagenfurt-Land

Government
  - Mayor: Prof . Franz Ragger

Area
  - Total: 25.5 km^{2} (9.8 sq mi)
- Elevation: 552 m (1,811 ft)

Population (2018-01-01)
  - Total: 2,584
  - Density: 101/km^{2} (262/sq mi)
- Time zone: UTC+1 (CET)
  - Summer (DST): UTC+2 (CEST)
- Postal code: 9161
- Area code: 04227

Maria Rain (Slovene: Žihpolje) is a town in the district of Klagenfurt-Land in the Austrian state of Carinthia, known for its Baroque parish and pilgrimage church (rebuilt between 1700 and 1729).

== Geography ==
Maria Rain lies in the Rosental, 8 km south of Klagenfurt between the Sattnitz massif and the Drau, which is dammed here to form the Ferlach Reservoir.

== Population ==
According to the 2001 census 3.9% of the population are Carinthian Slovenes.

Village	Number of people 1991	Percent of Slovenes 1991	Percent of Slovenes 1951
Saberda/Zabrda	37	10.8%	4.2%
Obertöllern / Zgornje Dole	20	15.0%	42.4%
Stemeritsch/Smeriče	29	3.4%	0%
Oberguntschach / Zg. Humče	23	0%	14.3%
St. Ulrich / Šenturh	81	2.5%	8.0%
Toppelsdorf / Dolča vas	65	0%	23.3%
