= Köttmannsdorf =

Köttmannsdorf Kotmara vas
- Municipality
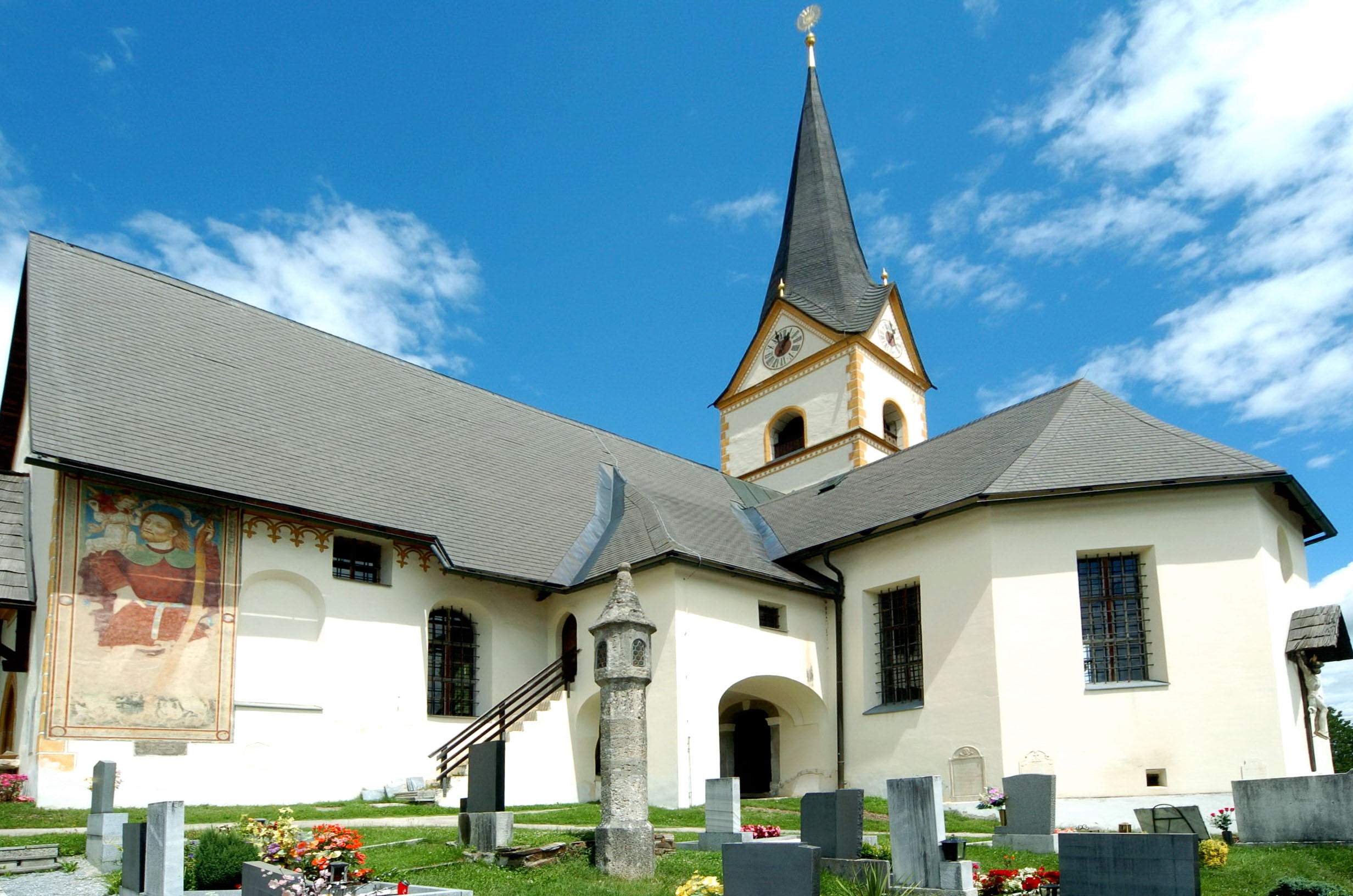
- Saint George parish church

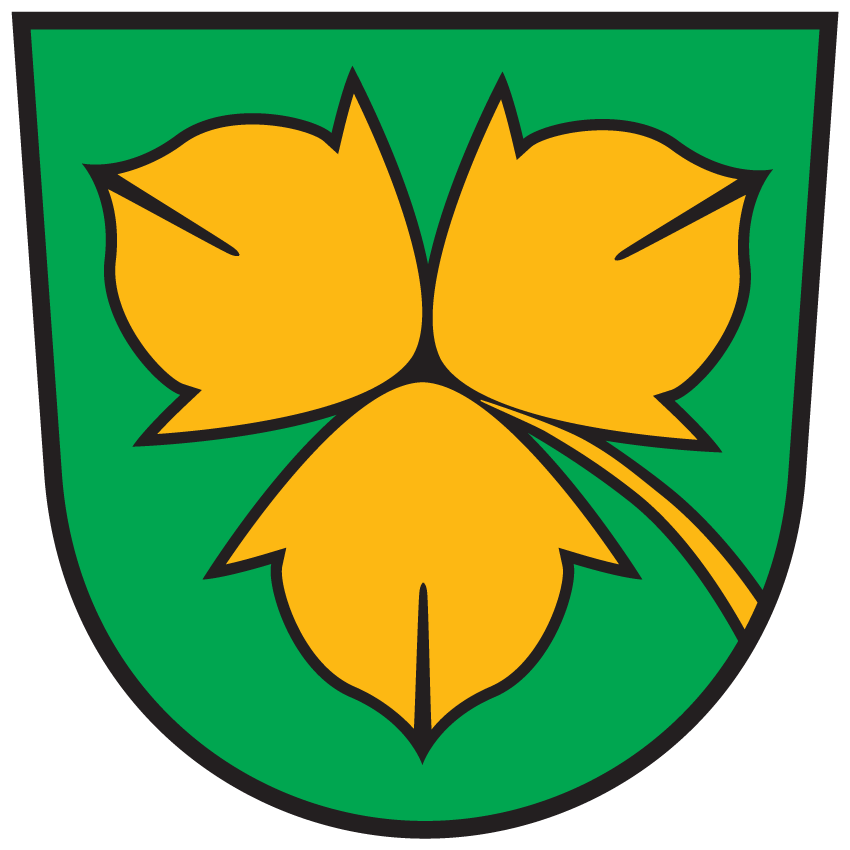
- Coat of arms

- Location within Austria Köttmannsdorf (Austria)
- Coordinates: 46°34′N 14°14′E
- Country: Austria
- State: Carinthia
- District: Klagenfurt-Land

Government
  - Mayor: Ing. Josef (Seppi) Lindl

Area
  - Total: 28.16 km^{2} (10.87 sq mi)
- Elevation: 558 m (1,831 ft)

Population (2018-01-01)
  - Total: 3,004
  - Density: 106.7/km^{2} (276.3/sq mi)
- Time zone: UTC+1 (CET)
  - Summer (DST): UTC+2 (CEST)
- Postal code: 9071
- Area code: 04220
- Website: www.koettmannsdorf.at

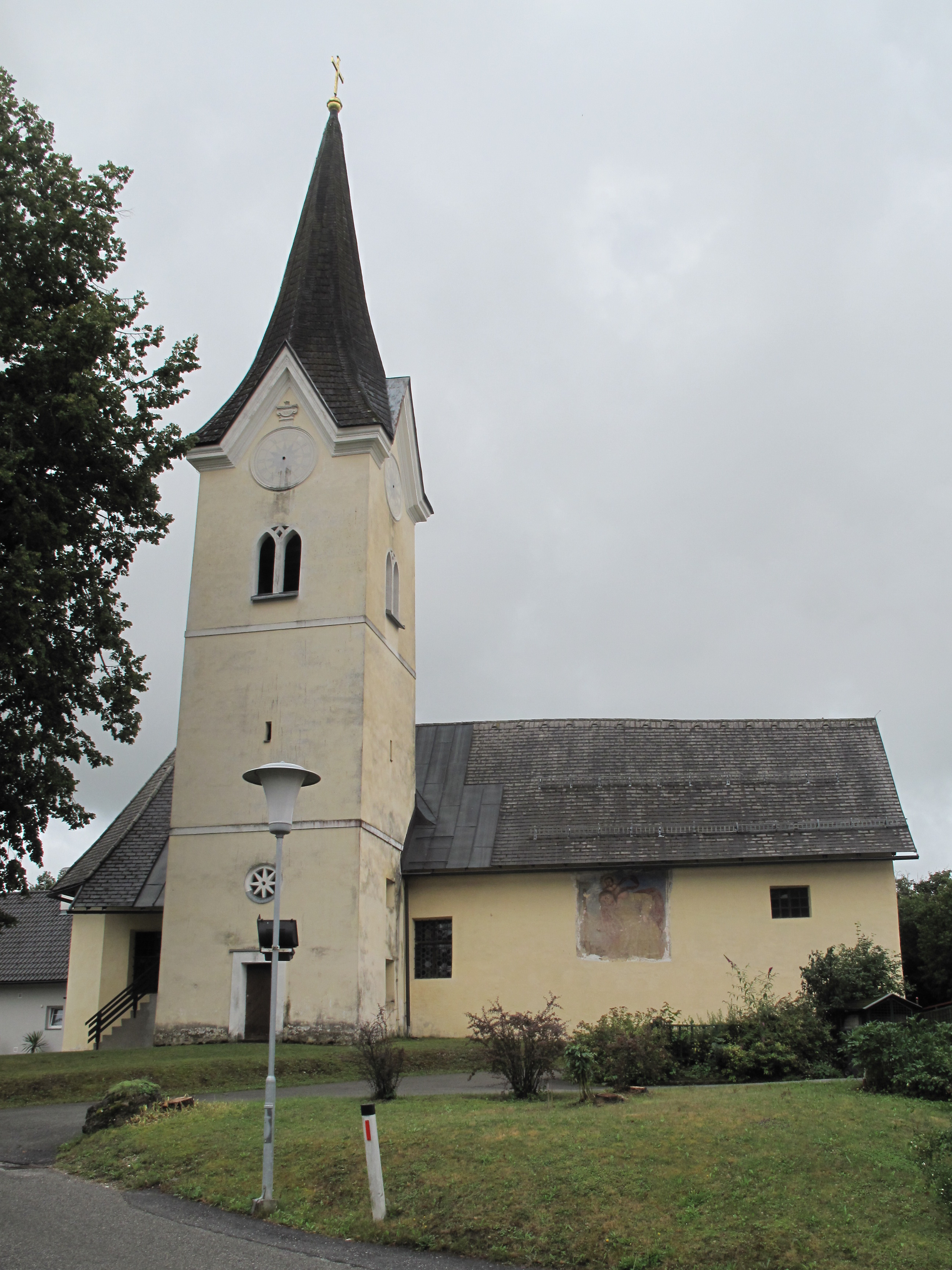
Sankt Gandolf, church

Köttmannsdorf (Slovene: Kotmara vas) is a town in the district of Klagenfurt-Land in the Austrian state of Carinthia.

== Geography ==
Köttmannsdorf lies southwest of Klagenfurt in the heights of the Sattnitz Mountains. The highest point in the municipality at 921 m is the Sabalahöhe in the west, and the lowest point the Ferlach Reservoir at 441 m. The Rekabach flows from west to east through the municipality, its name coming from the Slovene name for river, reka.

== Population ==
According to the 2001 census 6.4% of the population are Carinthian Slovenes.

Village (German)	Village (Slovenian)	Number of people 1991	Percent of Slovenes 1991	Percent of Slovenes 1951
Neusaß	Vesava	48	45.8%	100%
Plöschenberg	Plešivec	34	47.1%	81.2%
St.Gandolf	Šentkandolf	77	6.5%	85.4%
Trabesing	Trabesinje	188	14.4%	65.9%
Tschachoritsch	Čahorče	251	16.7%	91.7%
Gaisach	Čežava	49	10.2%	20.0%
Hollenburg	Humberk	8	12.5%	15.4%
St.Margarethen	Šmarjeta	60	21.7%	100%
Wurdach	Vrdi	118	12.7%	63.0%
Preliebl	Preblje	64	9.4%	46.5%
Göriach	Gorje	76	6.6%	28.6%
Tschrestal	Črezdol	52	9.6%	62.2%
Köttmannsdorf	Kotmara vas	709	6.3%	50.1%
