= Feistritz im Rosental =

Town in Carinthia, Austria

Feistritz im Rosental Bistrica v Rožu
- Municipality
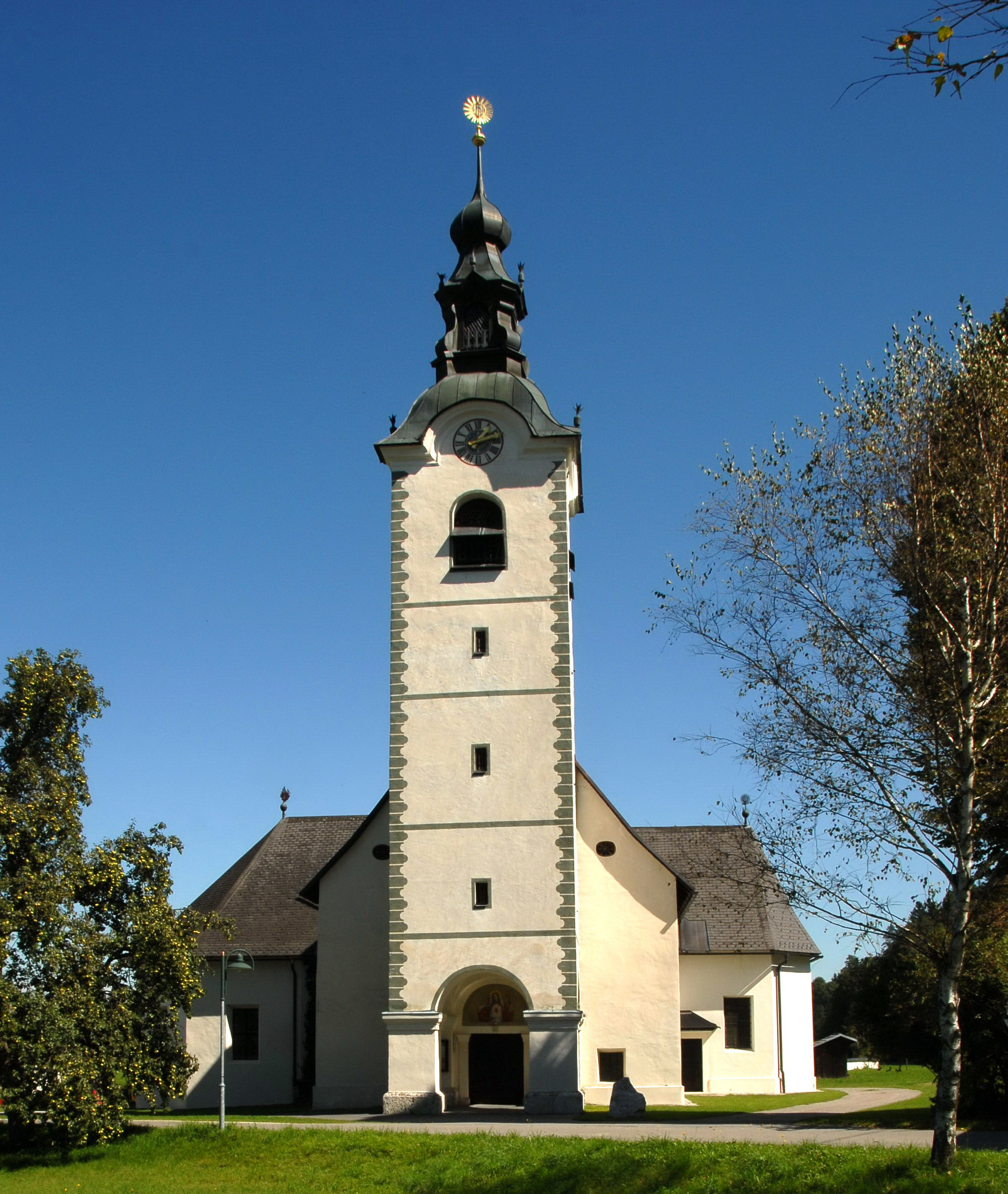
- St John parish church

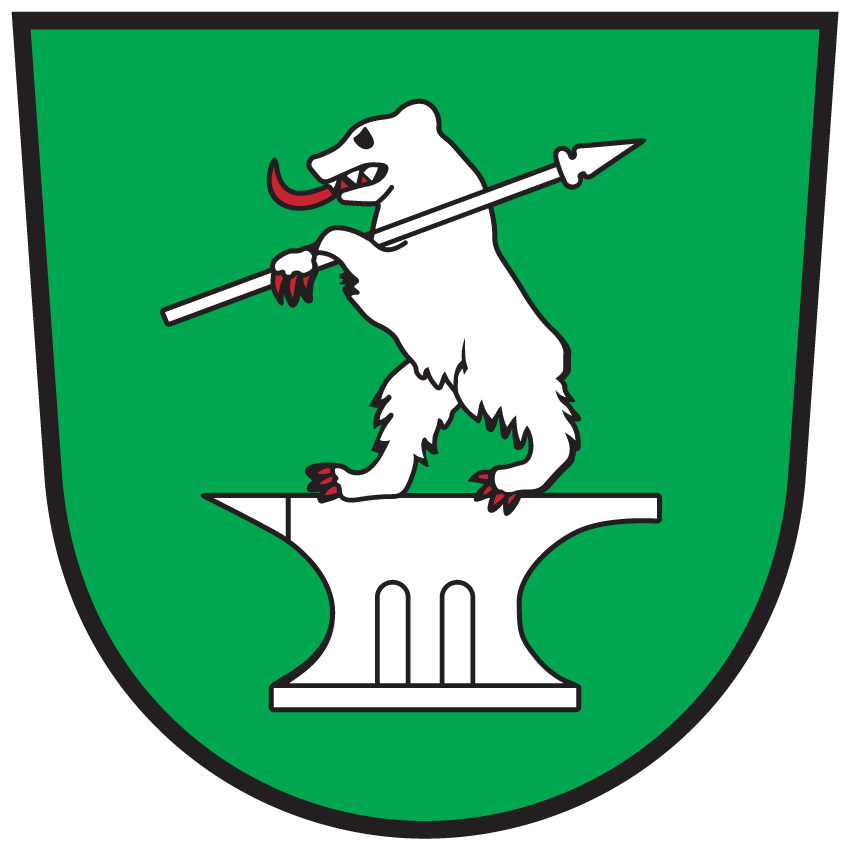
- Coat of arms

- Location within Austria
- Coordinates: 46°31′N 14°10′E
- Country: Austria
- State: Carinthia
- District: Klagenfurt-Land

Government
  - Mayor: Sonya Feinig (SPÖ)

Area
  - Total: 71.73 km^{2} (27.70 sq mi)
- Elevation: 549 m (1,801 ft)

Population (2018-01-01)
  - Total: 2,506
  - Density: 34.94/km^{2} (90.49/sq mi)
- Time zone: UTC+1 (CET)
  - Summer (DST): UTC+2 (CEST)
- Postal code: 9181
- Area code: 04228
- Website: www.rosengemeinde.at

Feistritz im Rosental (Slovene: Bistrica v Rožu), often referred to as simply Feistritz (Austrian German: [ˈfaɪstrɪts]), is a market town in the district of Klagenfurt-Land in the Austrian state of Carinthia.

== Geography ==
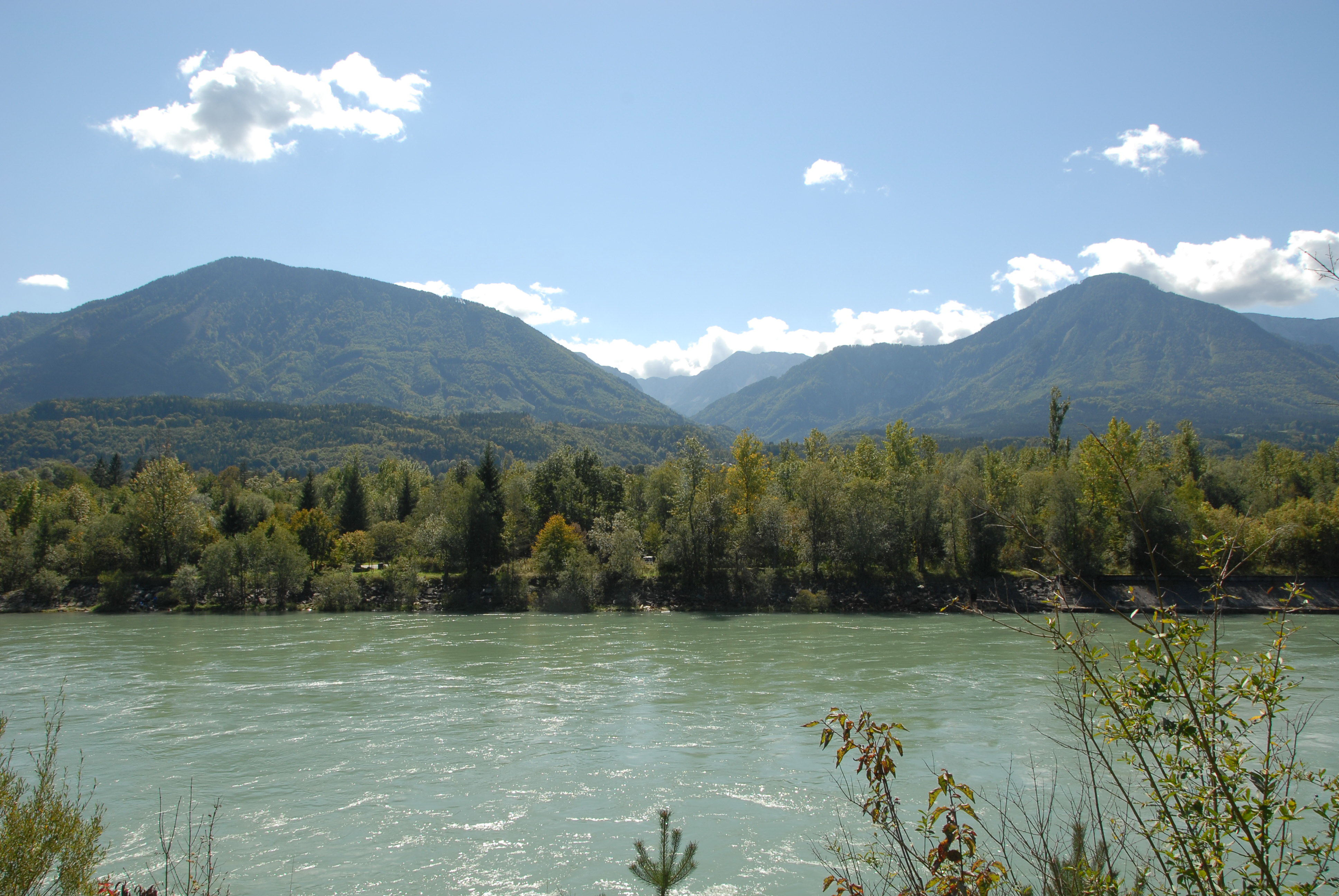
View from the Drava to the Karawanks

It is located in the Rosental, the U-shaped valley of the Drava river north of the Karawanks mountain range along the Periadriatic Seam. The valley is named after the Carinthian noble house of Ras, who had Rosegg Castle built around 1200. It is a traditional settlement area of Carinthian Slovenes. The Karawanks in the south form the border with Upper Carniola.

The municipal area stretches from the Drava and neighbouring Ludmannsdorf beyond the river up to Mt. Stol (Hochstuhl), the highest peak of the Karawanks range at 2,236 m (7,336 ft) which can be reached via the Bärental (Rute) high valley. It comprises the cadastral communities of Feistritz (Bistrica), Gansdorf, Hundsdorf (Podsinja vas), Matschach (Mače), Suetschach (Sveče), and Weizelsdorf (Svetna vas).

== History ==
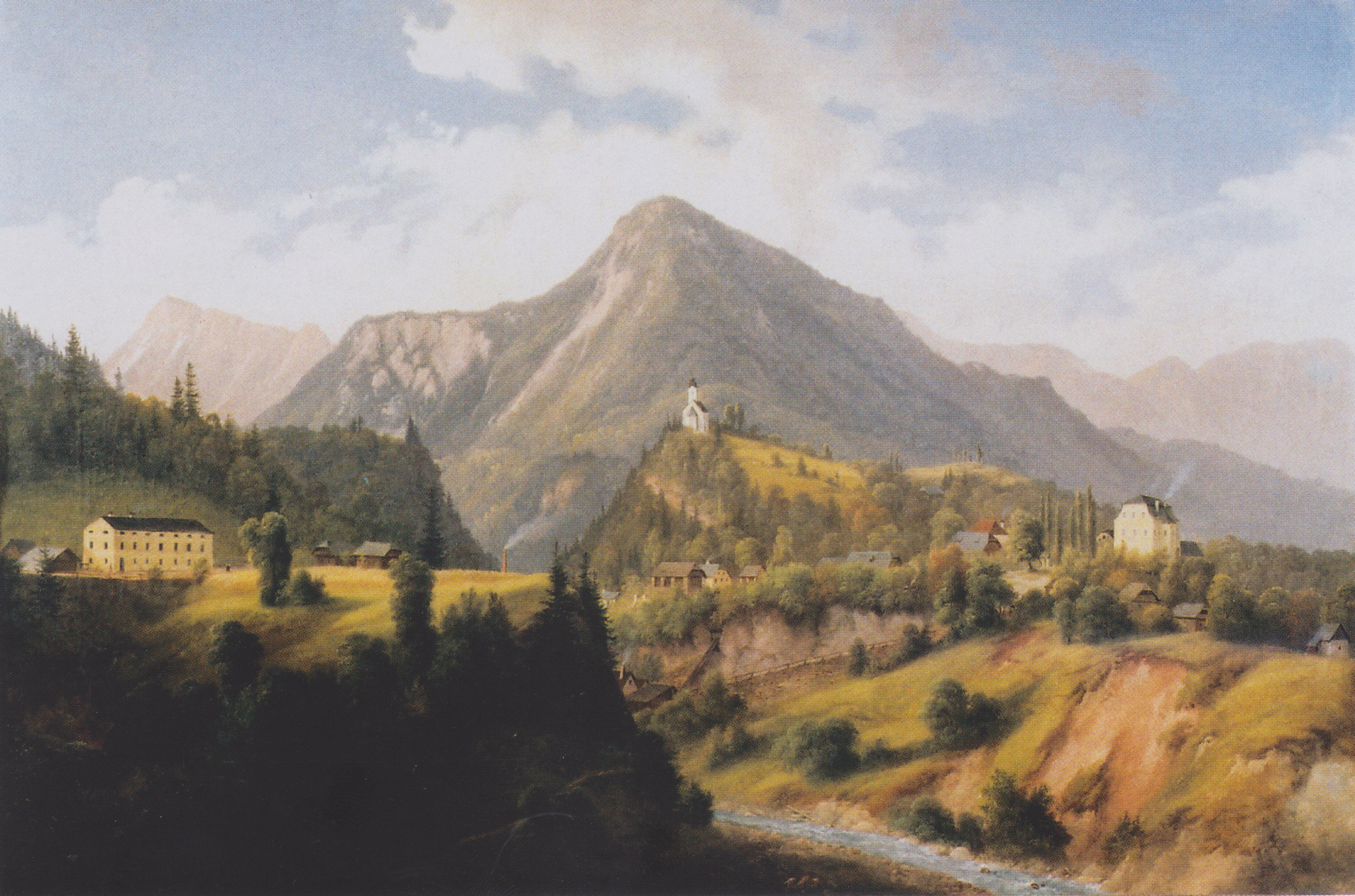
Feistritz im Rosental, painting by Markus Pernhart (1824–1871)

Feistritz was a historic site of iron ore processing at least since the 16th century. The Bärental mines later supplied the raw material for the production of steel wire used for telegraphy. During the early stages of industrialisation, a large rolling mill was founded in 1840. It was replaced as main employer by a battery manufacturing site (Bären-Batterie) in 1938, until the production was shut down in 1998.

The present-day municipality was established in 1850, at first called Suetschach. It merged with neighbouring Weizelsdorf in 1973 and received the status of a market town in 1996.

In the Carinthian Plebiscite of 1920, Feistritz was one of the 17 Carinthian municipalities where the majority of the population (55%) voted for the annexation to the Kingdom of Serbs, Croats and Slovenes (Yugoslavia).

== Population ==
According to the 2001 census 13.3% of the population are Carinthian Slovenes. Until the early 20th century, the local Slovene dialect was spoken by almost the totality of the population, and remained predominant up to the post-WWII years, when a process of language shift intensified. The municipality is made up of eight villages:

Village	Number of people 1991	Percent of Slovenes 1991	Percent of Slovenes 1951
Hundsdorf / Podsinja vas	157	14.6%	81.5%
St. Johann i.R. / Šentjanž v R.	279	42.3%	84.5%
Matschach/Mače	114	16.7%	77.5%
Suetschach/Sveče	574	13.4%	57.7%
Rabenberg / Šentjanške Rute	24	45.8%	92.5%
Feistritz i R. / Bistrica v Rožu	1054	6.7%	16.4%
Bärental/Zavrh	21	0%	77.3%
Weizelsdorf / Svetna vas	323	5.3%	45.4%

== Politics ==
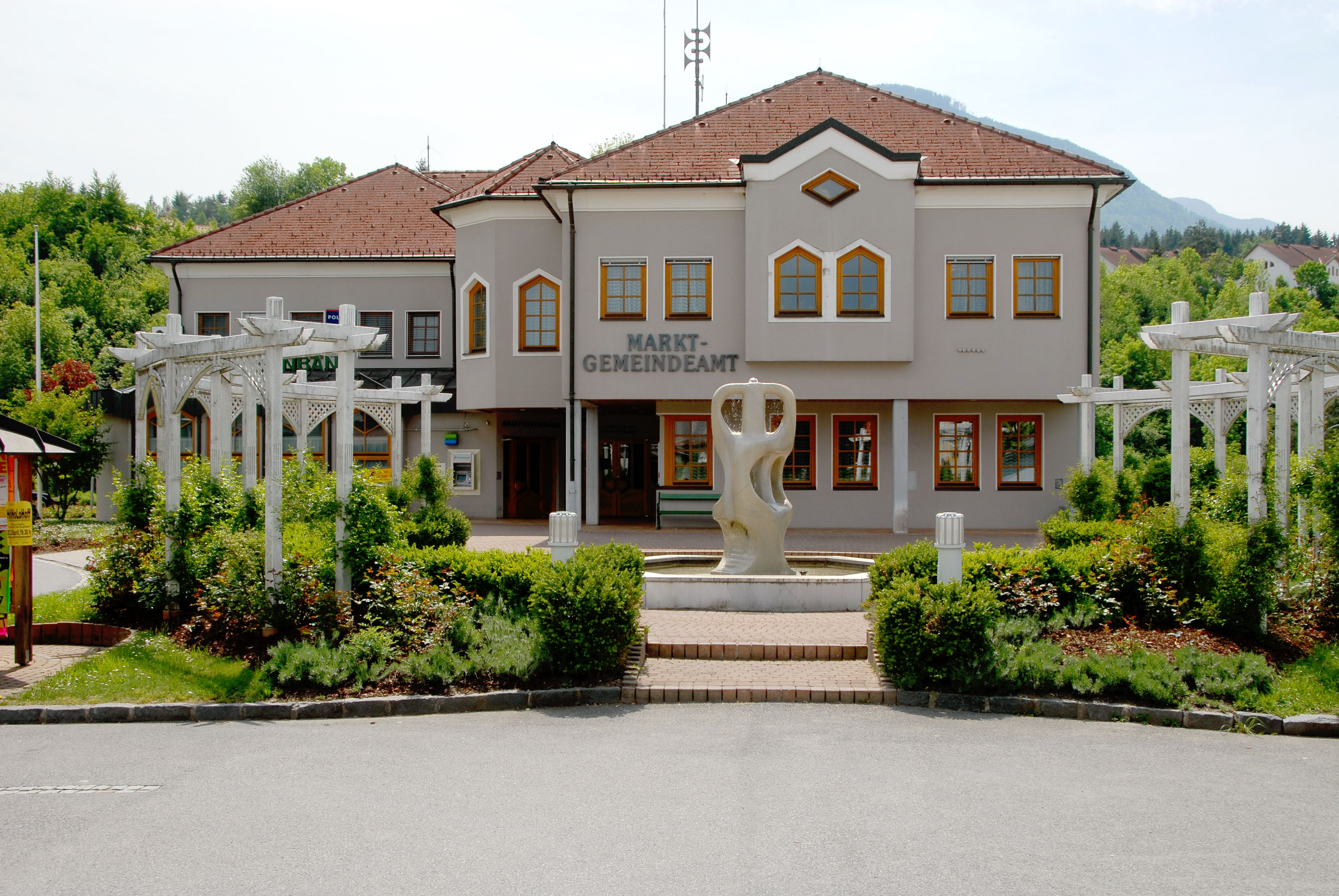
Town hall

Seats in the municipal assembly (Gemeinderat) as of 2015 local elections:

- Social Democratic Party of Austria (SPÖ): 12
- Freedom Party of Austria (FPÖ): 3
- Unity List (Enotna lista): 2
- Austrian People's Party (ÖVP): 2

== Notable people ==
Notable natives of Feistritz include the Slovene politician and editor Andrej Einspieler (1813–1888) and the diplomat Valentin Inzko (born 1949), who was born in Suetschach, where he lives with his wife Bernarda Fink (b. 1955). The Nordic skier Tomaz Druml (b. 1988) was also born in Feistritz.

The sculptor France Gorše (1897–1986), a native from Zamostec, lived in the village of Suetschach, where he established an artist's studio in 1974, now open to the public. Also the politician and former Carinthian governor Jörg Haider (1950–2008) lived in Bärental.
