= Ludmannsdorf =

Ludmannsdorf Bilčovs
- Municipality
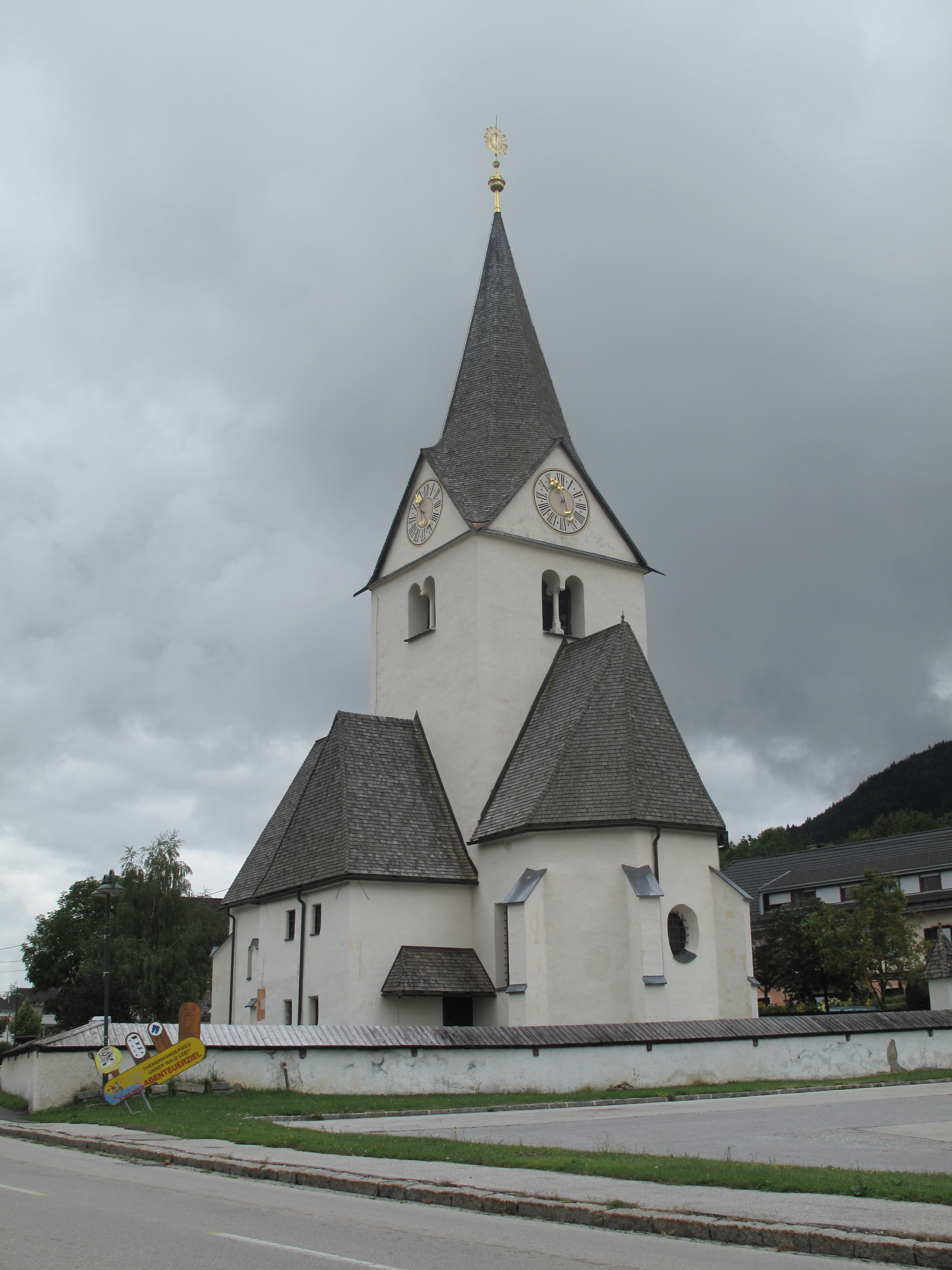

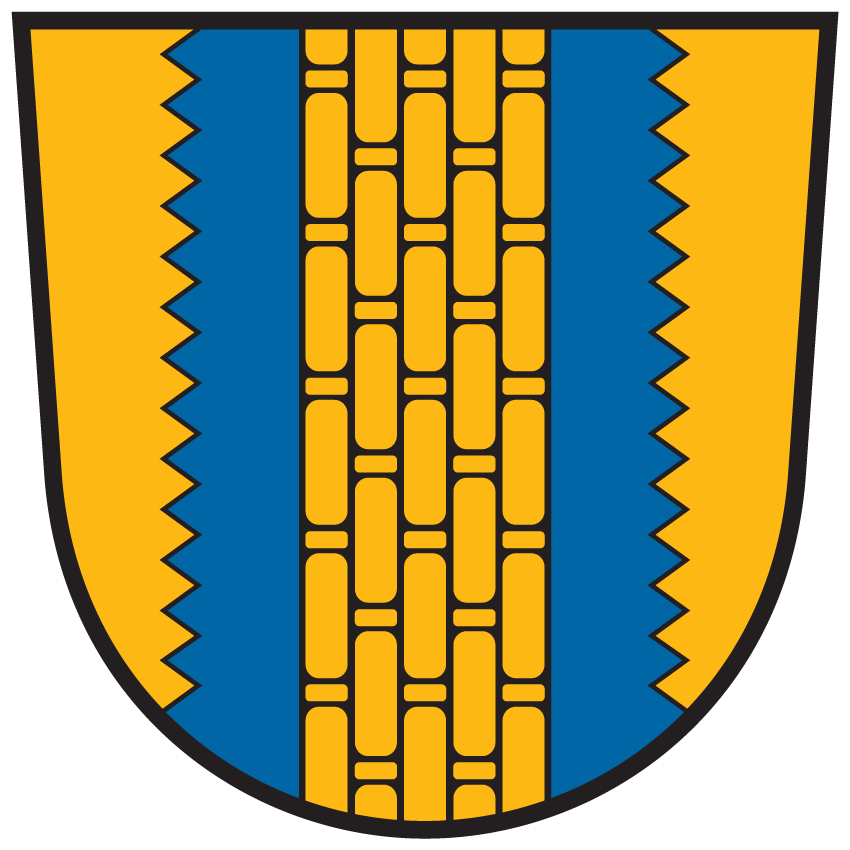
- Coat of arms

- Location within Austria
- Coordinates: 46°32′N 14°8′E
- Country: Austria
- State: Carinthia
- District: Klagenfurt-Land

Government
  - Mayor: Stefanie Quantschnig

Area
  - Total: 26.2 km^{2} (10.1 sq mi)
- Elevation: 564 m (1,850 ft)

Population (2018-01-01)
  - Total: 1,780
  - Density: 67.9/km^{2} (176/sq mi)
- Time zone: UTC+1 (CET)
  - Summer (DST): UTC+2 (CEST)
- Postal code: 9072
- Area code: 04228
- Website: www.ludmannsdorf.at

Ludmannsdorf (Slovene: Bilčovs) is a town in the district of Klagenfurt-Land in the Austrian state of Carinthia.

== Geography ==
It is located on the left bank of the Drava river.

== Population ==
According to the 2001 census, 28.3% of the population are Carinthian Slovenes. In the Carinthian Plebiscite of 1920, Sankt Jakob was one of the 17 Carinthian municipalities, where the majority of the population (79%) voted for the annexation to the Kingdom of Serbs, Croats and Slovenes (Yugoslavia).

Village (German)	Village (Slovene)	Number of people 1991	Percent of Slovenes 1991	Percent of Slovenes 1951
Bach	Potok	104	15.4%	98.6%
Edling	Kajzaze	191	27.2%	96.3%
Fellersdorf	Bilnjovs	52	36.5%	83.8%
Franzendorf	Branča vas	164	23.8%	63.8%
Großkleinberg	Mala gora	41	36.6%	100%
Ludmannsdorf	Bilčovs	150	50.7%	88.3%
Lukowitz	Koviče	91	12.1%	60.4%
Moschenitzen	Moščenica	50	98.0%	100%
Muschkau	Muškava	88	18.2%	94.0%
Niederdörfl	Spodnja vesca	98	13.3%	55.3%
Oberdörfl	Zgornja vesca	121	27.3%	46.5%
Pugrad	Podgrad	132	28.8%	37.8%
Rupertiberg	Na gori	57	33.3%	55.4%
Selkach	Želuče	99	57.6%	84.3%
Strein	Stranje	30	60.0%	100%
Wellersdorf	Velinja vas	115	40.0%	88.0%
Zedras	Sodraževa	16	25.0%	68.3%
