= Grafenstein =

Grafenstein Grabštajn
- Municipality
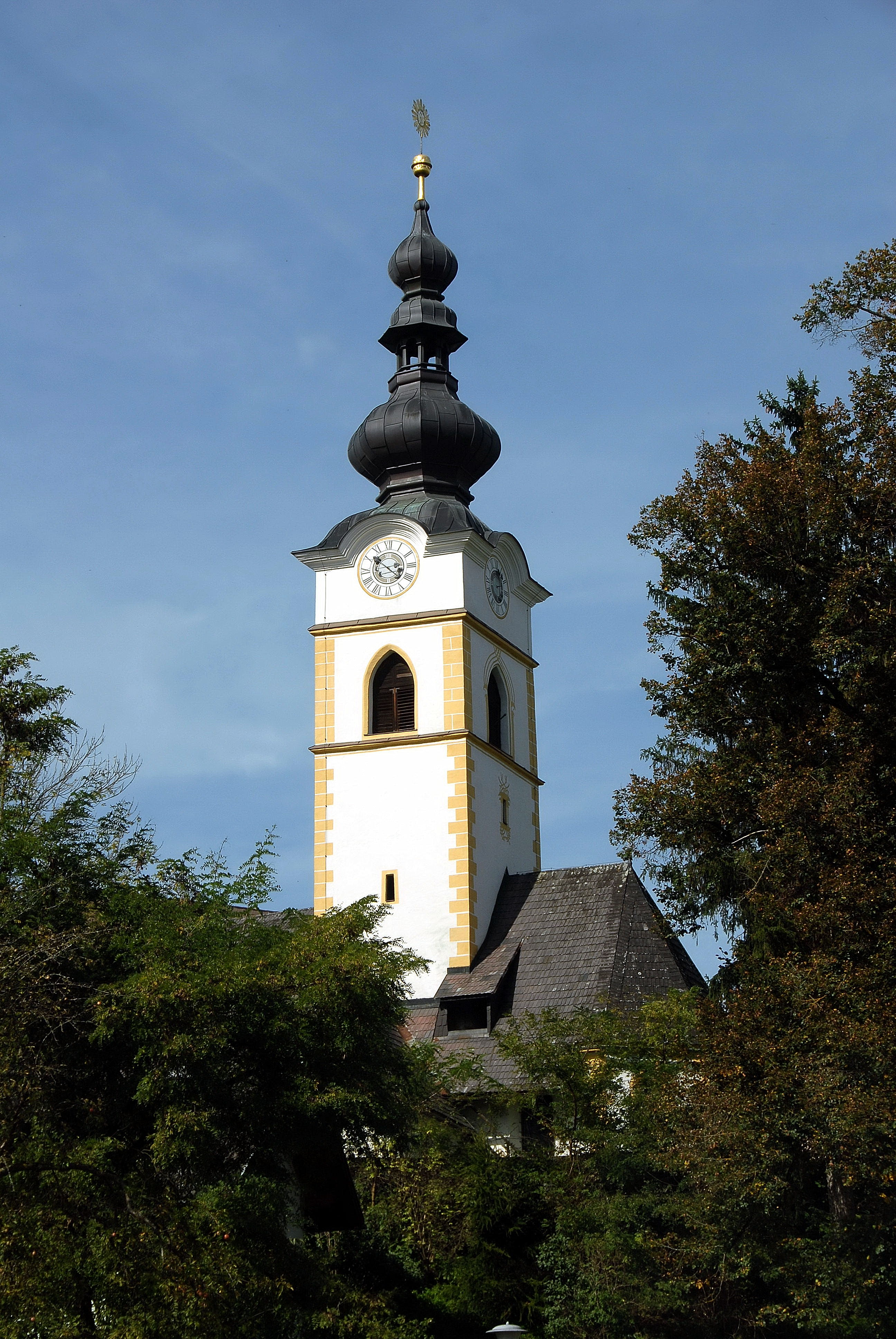
- Grafenstein parish church

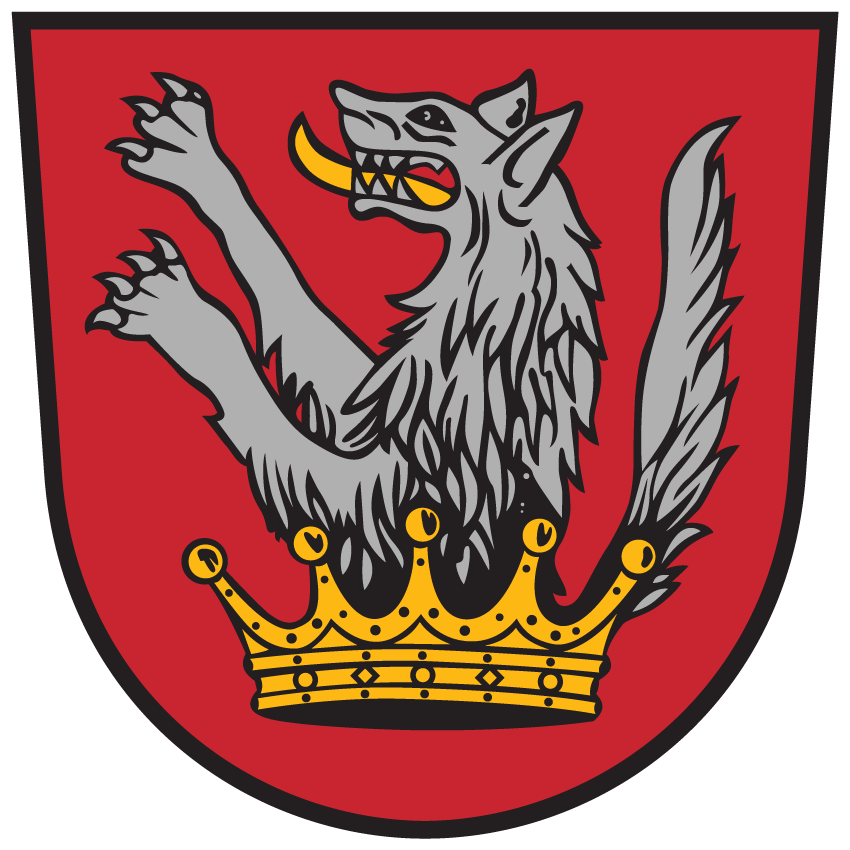
- Coat of arms

- Location within Austria
- Coordinates: 46°37′N 14°28′E
- Country: Austria
- State: Carinthia
- District: Klagenfurt-Land

Government
  - Mayor: Stefan Deutschmann (ÖVP)

Area
  - Total: 50.13 km^{2} (19.36 sq mi)
- Elevation: 418 m (1,371 ft)

Population (2018-01-01)
  - Total: 2,884
  - Density: 57.53/km^{2} (149.0/sq mi)
- Time zone: UTC+1 (CET)
  - Summer (DST): UTC+2 (CEST)
- Postal code: 9131
- Area code: 04225
- Website: www.grafenstein.co.at

Grafenstein (Slovene: Grabštajn) is a town in the district of Klagenfurt-Land in the Austrian state of Carinthia.

== Geography ==
Grafenstein lies in the basin of Klagenfurt, about 12 kilometres (7.5 mi) east of Klagenfurt on the Wörth Lake.
