= Ebenthal in Kärnten =

- Municipality
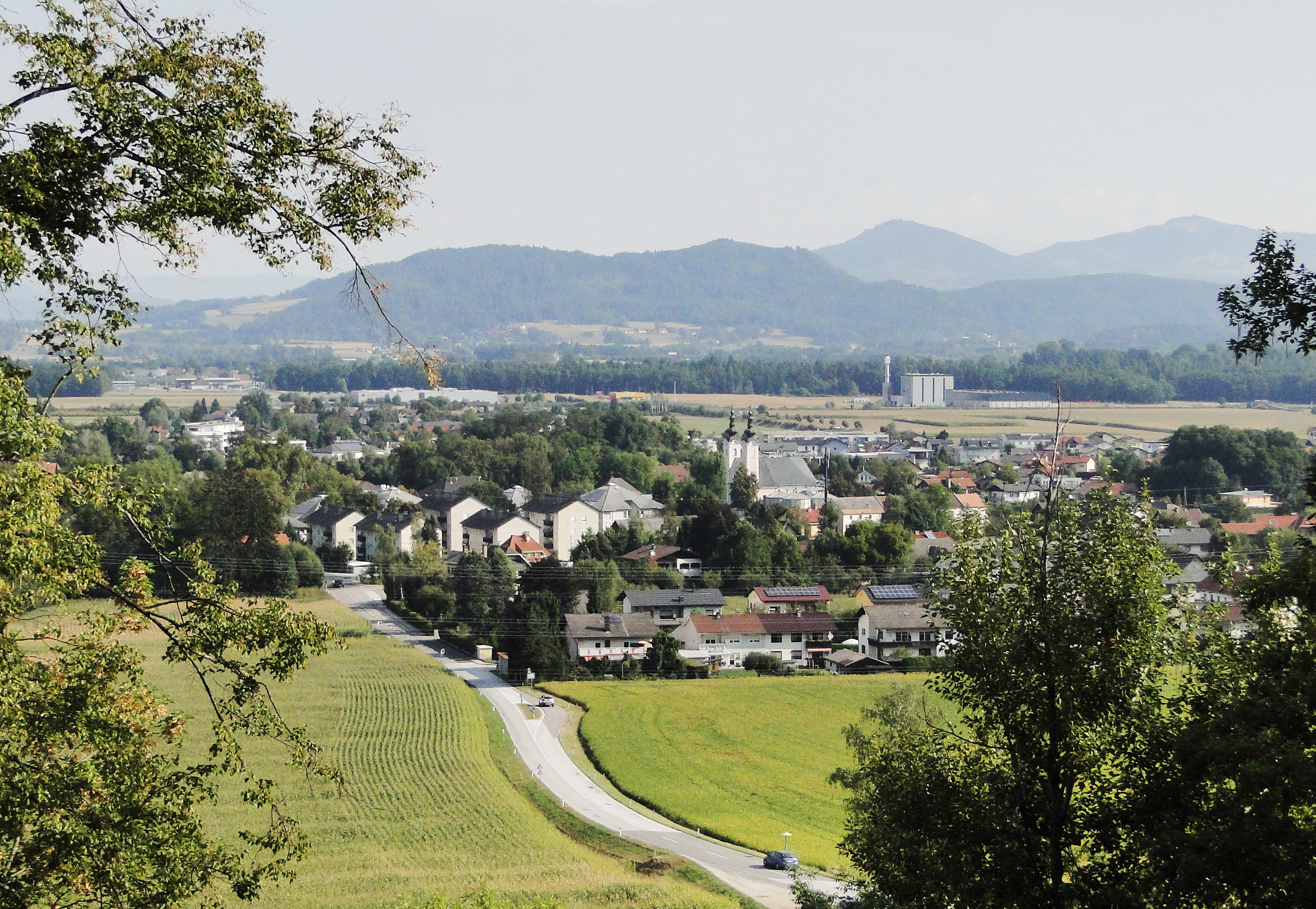
- Ebenthal

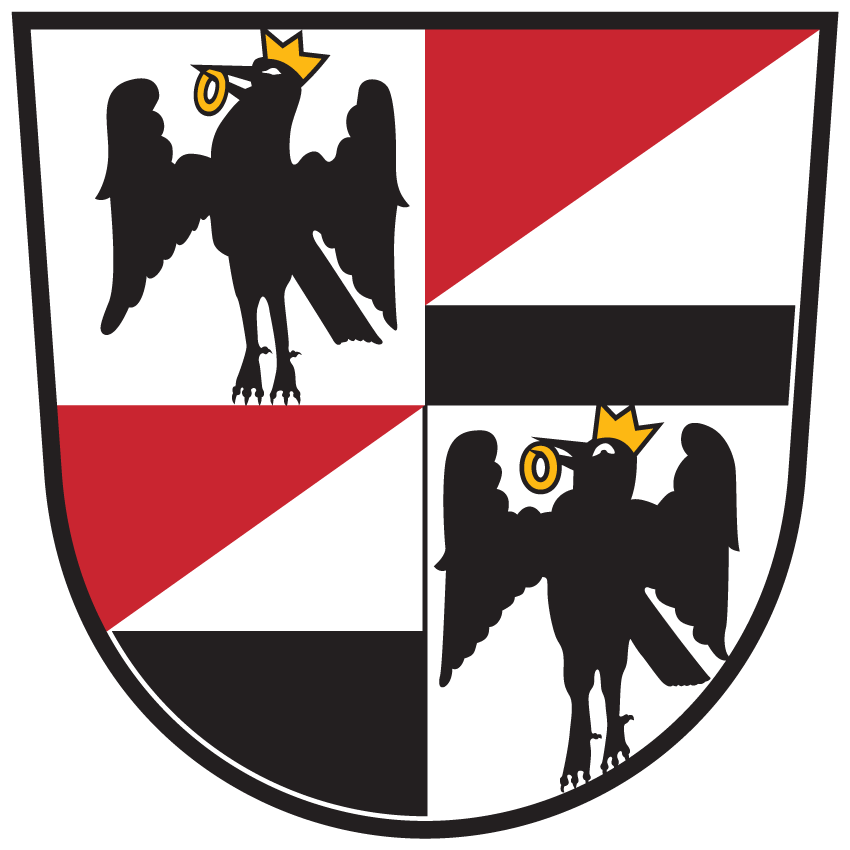
- Coat of arms

- Location within Austria
- Coordinates: 46°36′34″N 14°21′20″E
- Country: Austria
- State: Carinthia
- District: Klagenfurt-Land

Government
  - Mayor: Franz Felsberger (SPÖ)

Area
  - Total: 54.98 km^{2} (21.23 sq mi)
- Elevation: 415–855 m (1,362–2,805 ft)

Population (2018-01-01)
  - Total: 7,851
  - Density: 142.8/km^{2} (369.8/sq mi)
- Time zone: UTC+1 (CET)
  - Summer (DST): UTC+2 (CEST)
- Postal code: 9065
- Area code: 0463
- Vehicle registration: KL
- Website: www.ebenthal.co.at

Ebenthal in Kärnten (Slovene: Žrelec) is a town in the district of Klagenfurt-Land in the Austrian state of Carinthia.

== Geography ==
Ebenthal lies southeast of Klagenfurt. The Sattnitz Mountains stretch east and west and are a popular goal for outings. The Glan and the Gurk flow through the municipality and into the nearby Wörther Lake. The Glanfurt flows into the Glan near the middle of the municipality. The Radsberg forms the southern boundary of the municipality.

The nature reserve Höflein-Moor is in the municipality.

== Population ==
According to the 2001 census 4.2% of the population are Carinthian Slovenes.

Village	Number of people 1991	Percent of Slovenes 1991	Percent of Slovenes 1951
Kossiach/Kozje	60	31.7%	21.3%
Kreuth/Rute	93	72.0%	86.7%
Lipizach/Lipica	54	33.3%	3.1%
Radsberg/Radiše	88	75.0%	100%
Schwarz/Dvorec	143	12.6%	29.4%
Tutzach/Tuce	134	31.3%	69.4%
Werouzach/Verovce	35	60.0%	100%
Kosasmojach/Kozasmoje	35	0%	95.0%
Moosberg/Kajže	14	35.7%	75.0%
Berg/Rute pri Medgorjah	91	17.6%	76.9%
Mieger/Medgorje	2	0%	33.3%
Hinterberg/Zagorje	10	0%	35.7%
Sabuatach/Zablate	21	0%	96.2%
Kohldorf/Vogle	85	0%	95.7%
Obermieger/Zg. Medgorje	94	2.2%	87.7%
Obitschach/Običe	139	1.4%	91.3%
Haber/Gaber	38	0%	92.4%
Rottenstein/Podgrad	148	8.8%	91.3%
Saager/Zagorje	20	0%	89.3%
