= Lesce-Bled railway station =

Railway station in Upper Carniola, Slovenia

Lesce-Bled
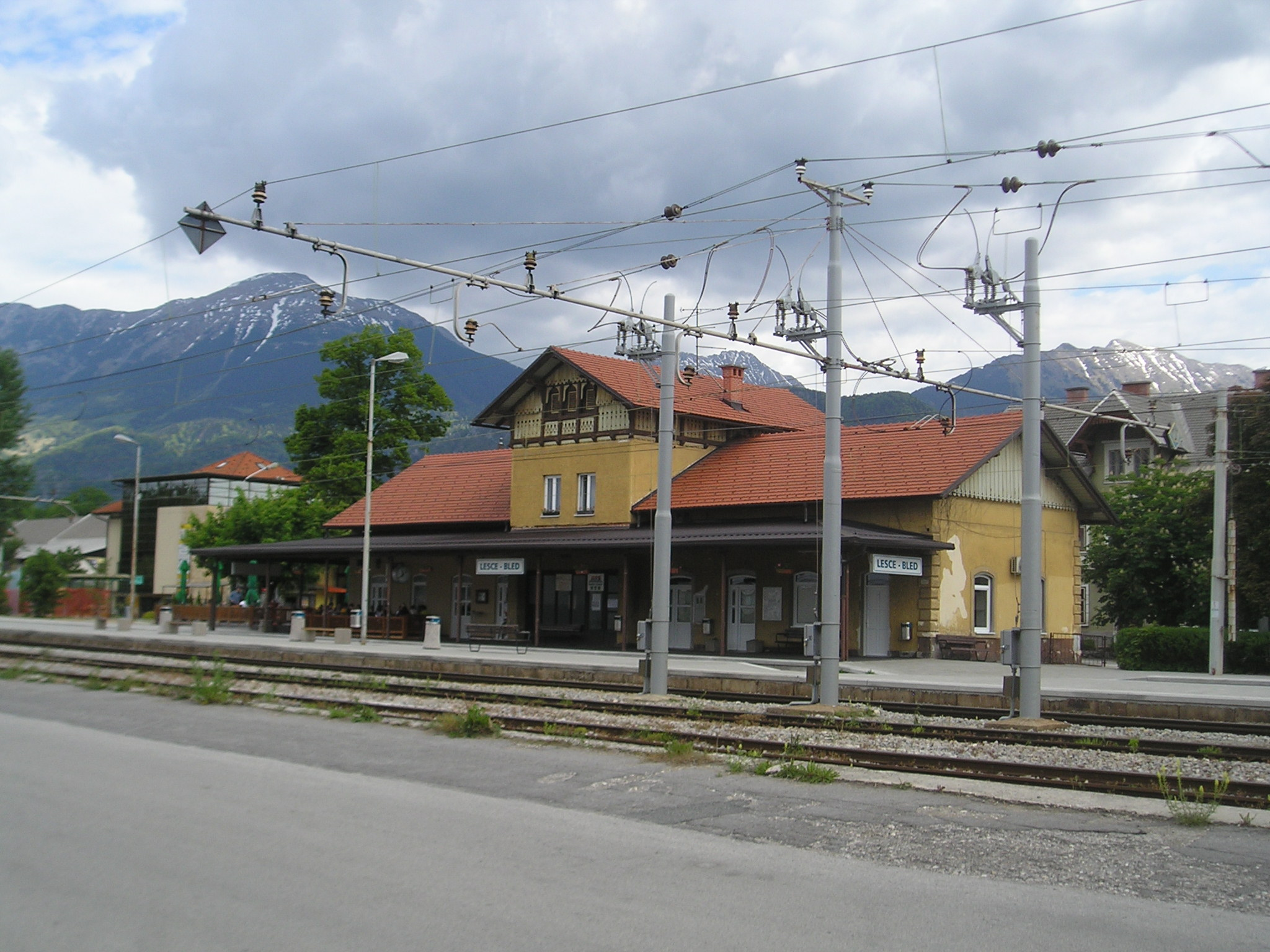
- Lesce-Bled railway station

General information
- Location: Železniška ulica, 4248 Lesce, Upper Carniola; Slovenia
- Coordinates: 46°21′37″N 14°09′29″E
- Owner: Slovenske železnice
- Operator: Slovenske železnice

Services
Preceding station	Croatian Railways	Following station
Jesenice towards Zürich HB or Stuttgart Hbf	EuroNight	Kranj towards Zagreb
Location
- Location within Slovenia

Lesce-Bled railway station (Slovene: Železniška postaja Lesce Bled) is a railway station in the town of Lesce in the Upper Carniola region of northwestern Slovenia. It also serves the nearby town of Bled about 4 km away. It is operated by Slovenian Railways (SŽ).

== Description ==
Lesce-Bled station is situated on the Tarvisio–Ljubljana Railway which opened in 1870, although the section of line between Jesenice and Tarvisio closed in the 1960s. It is served by regional trains between Ljubljana and Jesenice, as well as international trains between Zagreb Glavni kolodvor and (via the Karawanks Tunnel) Villach Hauptbahnhof, many of which continue to Salzburg Hauptbahnhof, Munich Hauptbahnhof and Frankfurt Hauptbahnhof.
