= Rosenbach, Austria =

Rosenbach Rosenbach
- Village
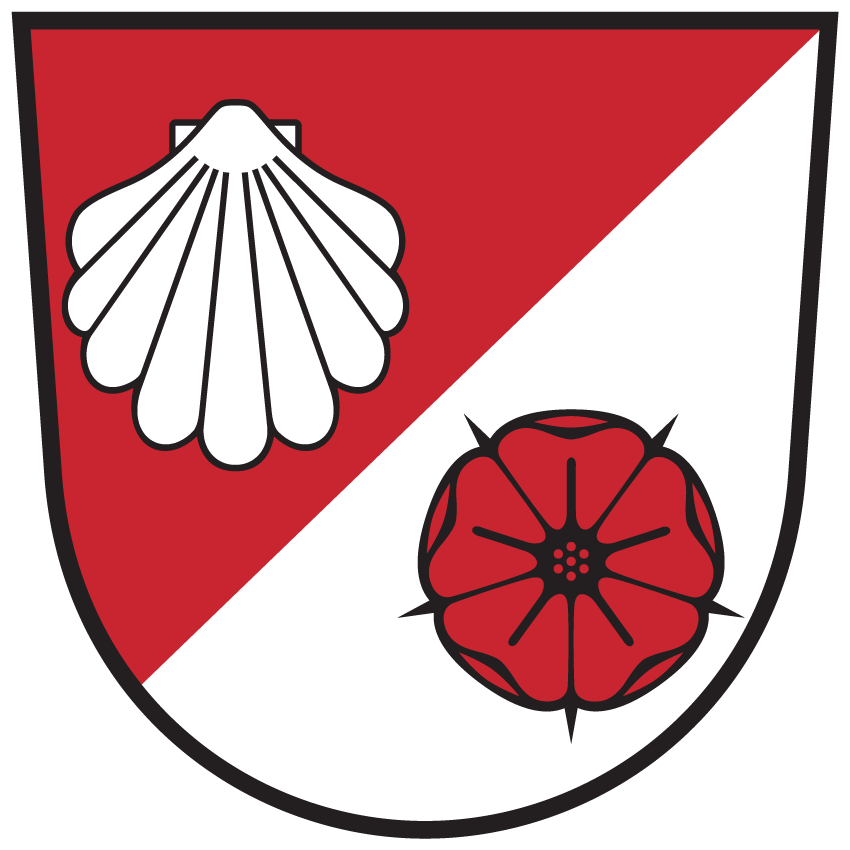
- Seal

- Location within Austria
- Coordinates: 46.531353°N 14.037684°E

Government
  - Mayor: Henry Kattnig
- Elevation: 480 m (1,570 ft)

Population (2012)
  - Total: 4,323
- Postal code: 9184
- Area code: 0 42 53
- Website: Official website

Rosenbach is a village in central Carinthia, Austria, an Ortsteil of Sankt Jakob im Rosental located a few kilometers southwest of the center of Sankt Jakob, and just northeast of the northern entrance to the Karawanken Tunnel. The Rosenbach railway station is the final Austrian station of the Rosental Railway (Rosentalbahn), connecting Sankt Veit an der Glan via Klagenfurt Central Station to the tunnel towards Slovenia, and it also has a connection to the Villach Central Station.

== Gallery ==
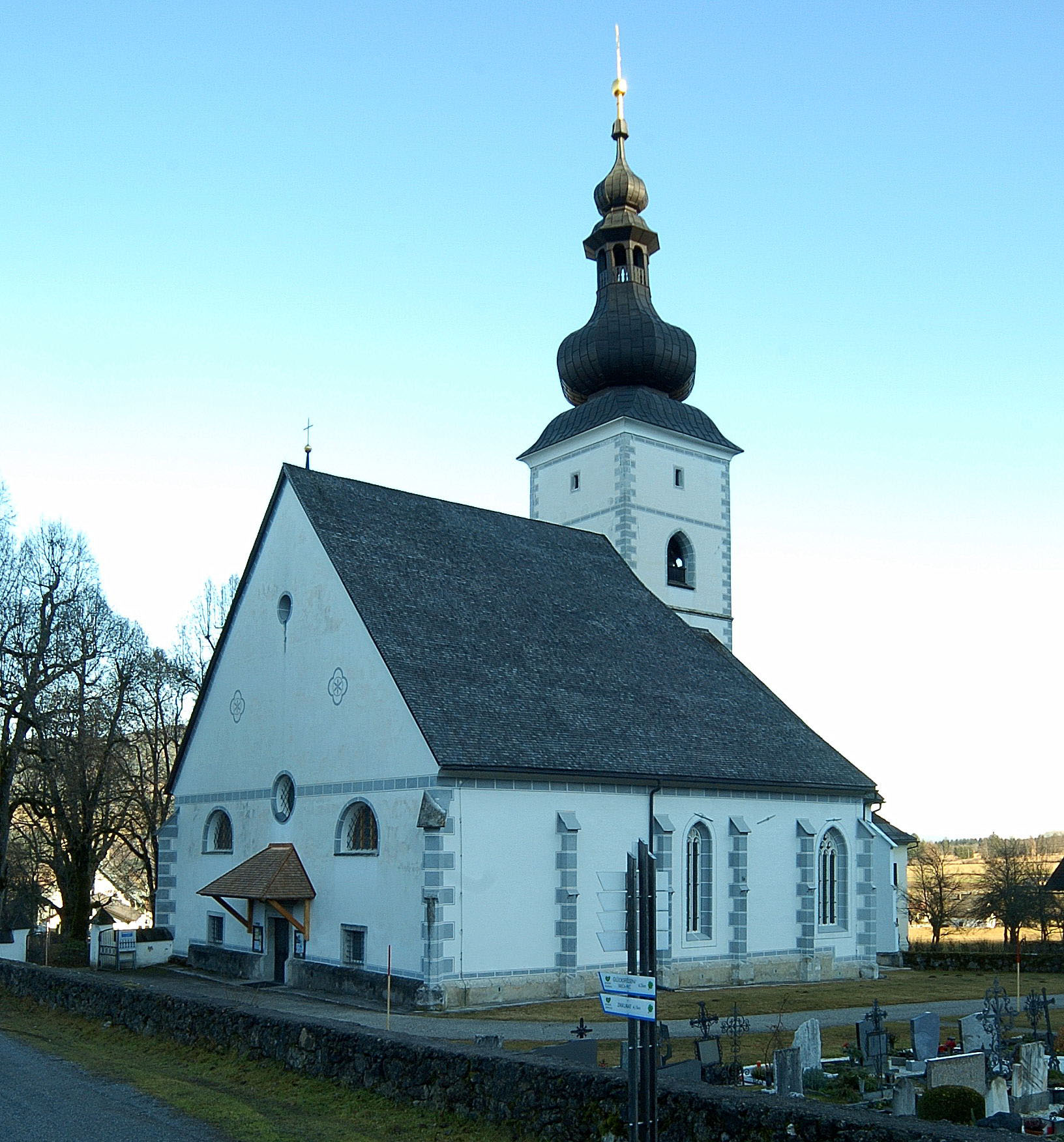
Parish and pilgrimage church Mary Misery in Maria Elend

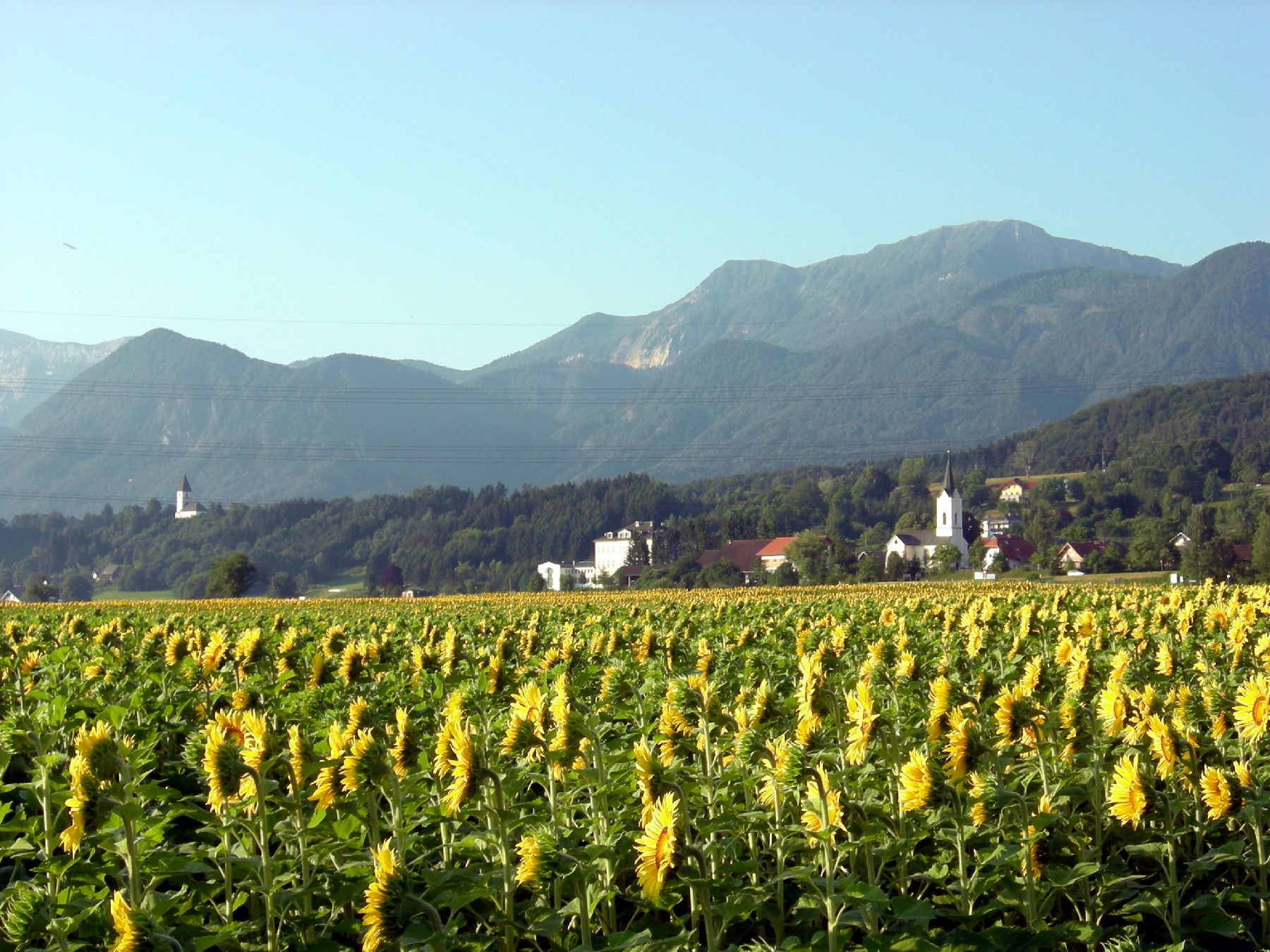
St. Peter's (the district of St. Jakob im Rosental) with mountain in the background

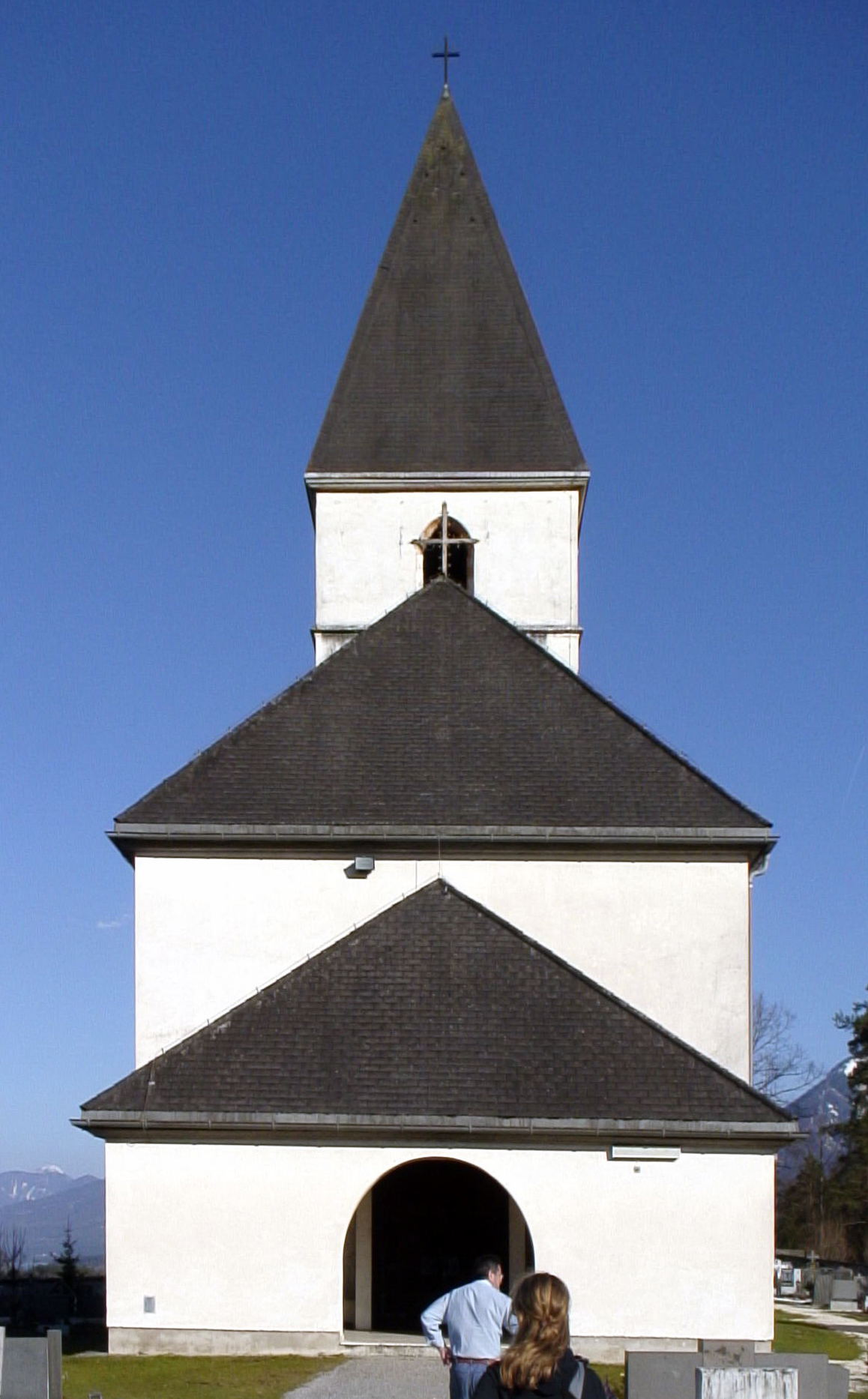
Parish church Holy Jakob

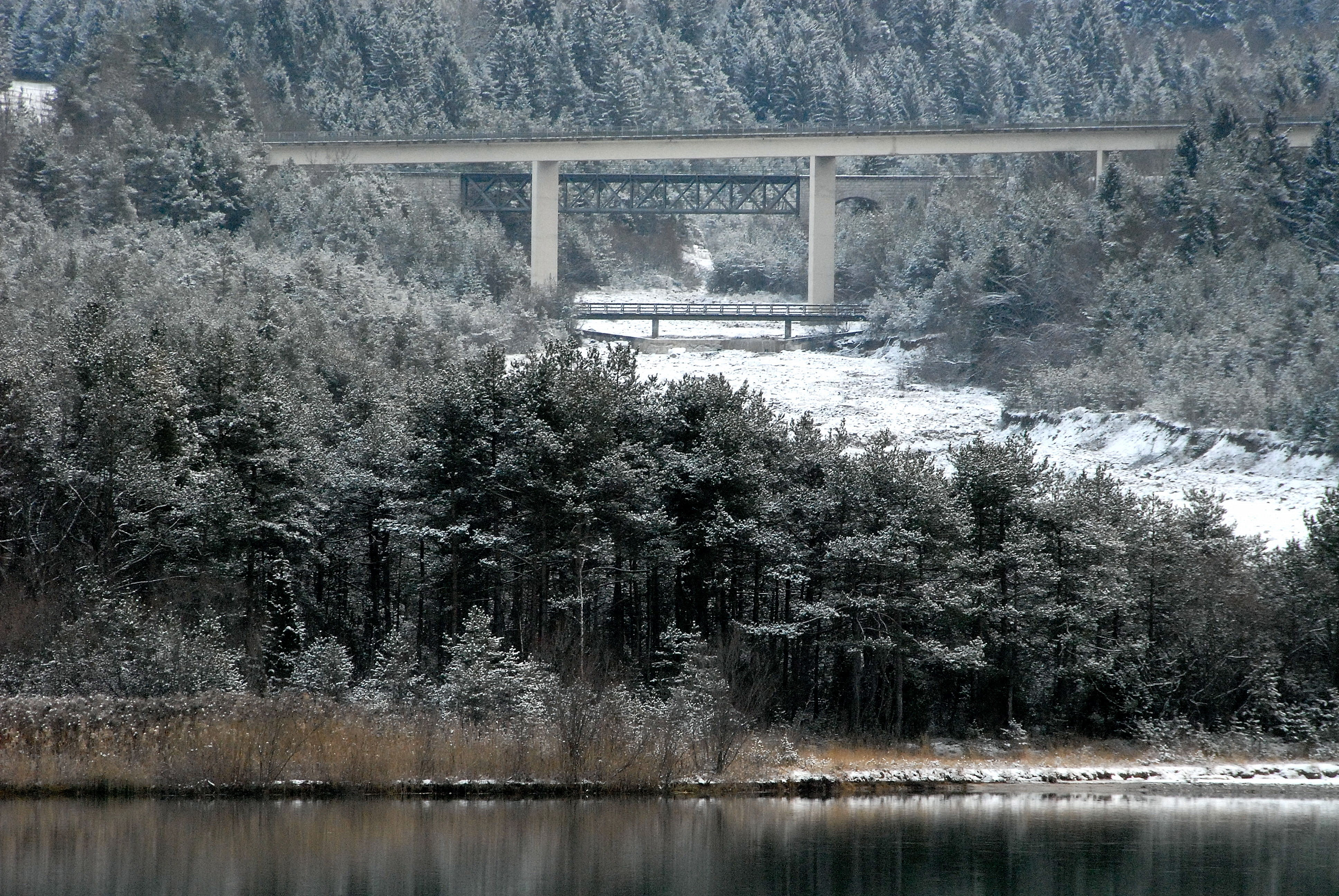
"Sucher" ditch with the three bridges across the river (railroad bridge, road bridge and pedestrian bridge) at Maria Elend

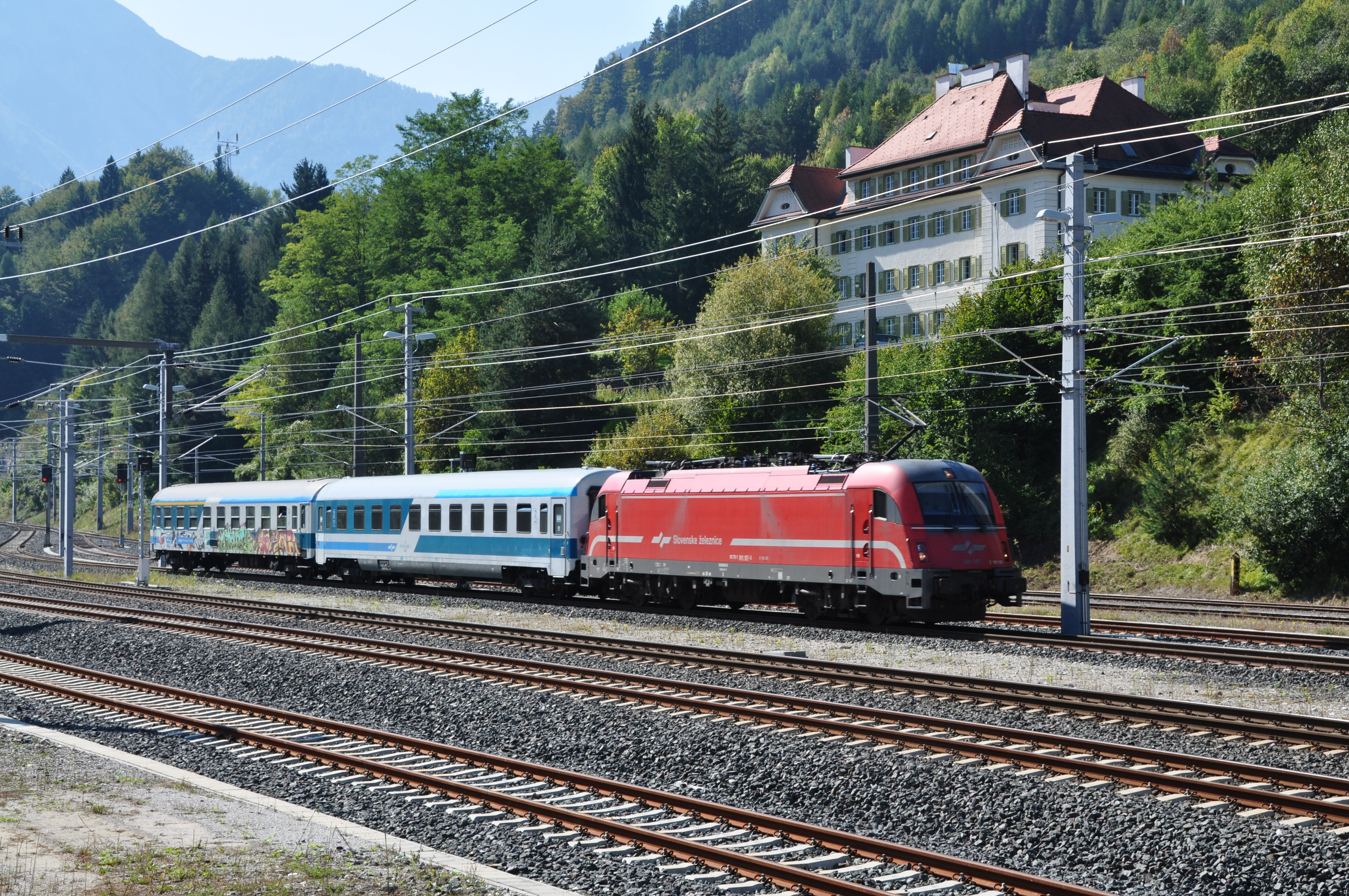
Slovenian train passing through the Rosenbach train station

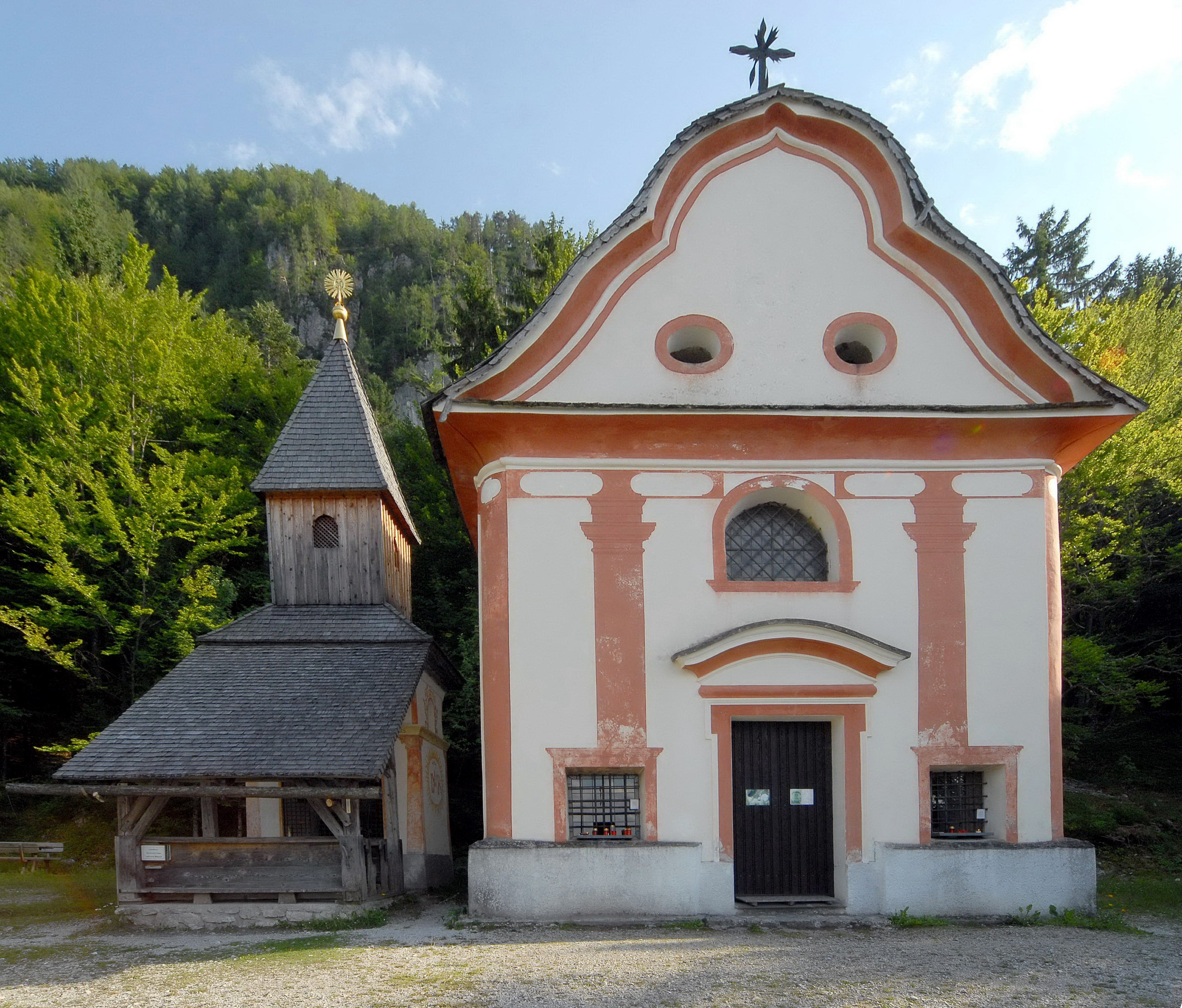
Chapels on the "chapel mountain"

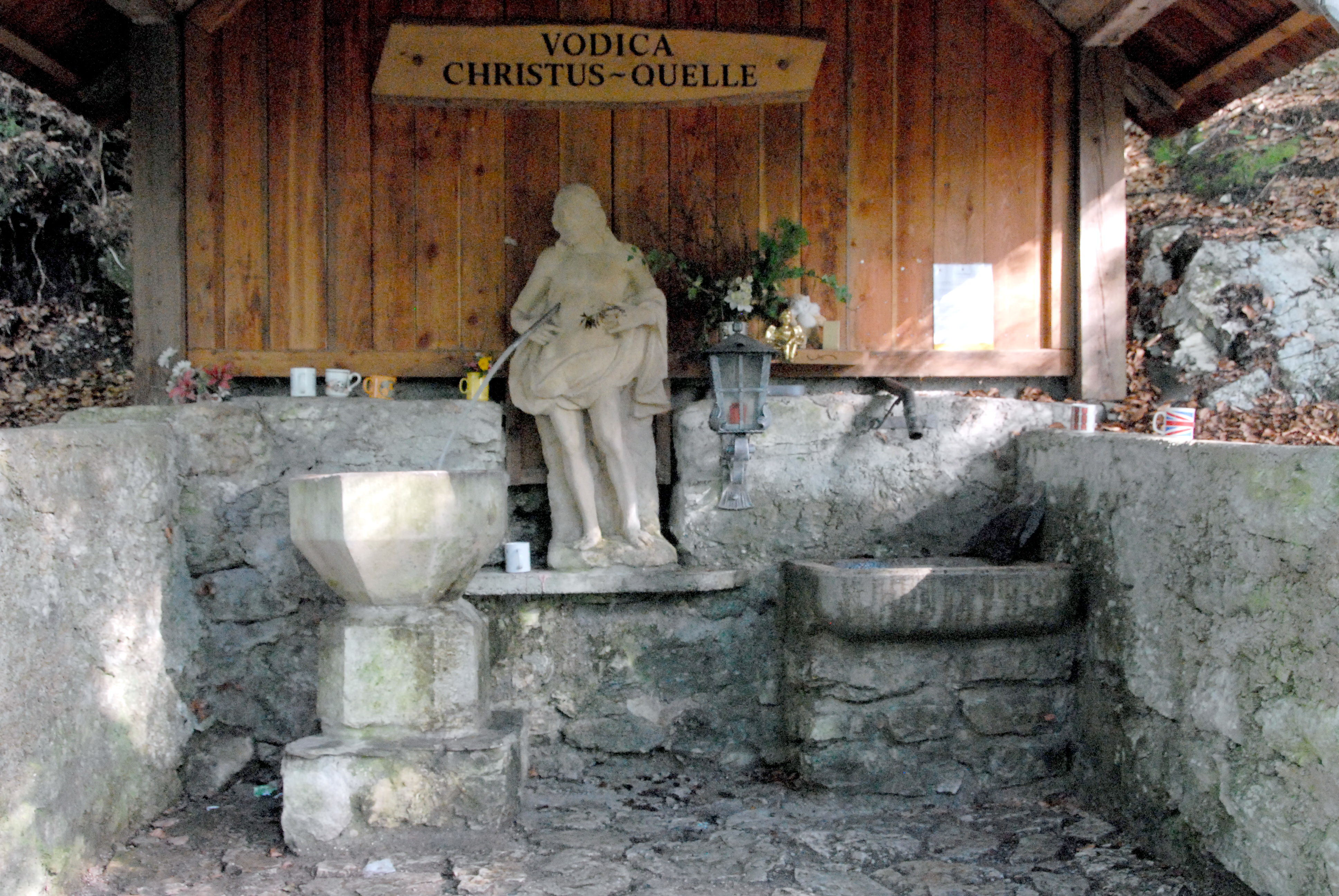
Water well "Vodica" on the chapel mountain
