= Rosen Valley Railway =

Overview
- Native name: Rosentalbahn
- Line number: 413 01 Sankt Veit an der Glan–Klagenfurt Hbf; 409 01 Klagenfurt Hbf–Rosenbach; 222 02 Rosenbach–national border

Service
- Route number: 221 (Villach Hbf–Jesenice); 601 (Friesach–Spittal-Millstättersee); 660 (Klagenfurt Hbf–Rosenbach)

History
- Opened: 1906

Technical
- Line length: 62.812 km (39.030 mi)
- Number of tracks: St. Veit a. d. Glan–Klagenfurt and Rosenbach–Jesenice: 2
- Track gauge: 1,435 mm (4 ft 8 1/2 in) standard gauge
- Minimum radius: 266 m (873 ft)
- Electrification: St. Veit a. d. Glan–Klagenfurt Hbf and Rosenbach–Jesenice: 15 kV 16.7 Hz AC
- Operating speed: 160 km/h (99 mph) (max)
- Maximum incline: 2.6%

The Rosen Valley Railway (German: Rosentalbahn) is a mainly Austrian railway that runs from Sankt Veit an der Glan via Klagenfurt and Rosenbach to Jesenice in Slovenia. The section between Rosenbach and Jesenice through the Karawanks Tunnel is part of Pan-European Corridor X, an international long-distance route between Salzburg and Zagreb. The railway line is operated by the ÖBB (Austrian Federal Railways). Traffic between Weizelsdorf and Rosenbach was suspended at the commencement 2016/17 timetable change. The line was sold to the state of Carinthia. NBIK heritage trains have been running between Weizelsdorf and Feistritz since the summer of 2020.

== History ==
Iron was worked from the 16th century in the agricultural Rosen Valley (Rosental, part of the valley of the Drava), in the area of Feistritz im Rosental and there were iron works in Ferlach as well. When the Austrian Southern Railway Company (Südbahn-Gesellschaft) connected Carinthia to the railway network with the Carinthian Railway (Kärntner Bahn) in 1863, the Rosen valley was bypassed. The iron produced here still had to be transported over the Loibl Pass in horse-drawn vehicles. As early as 1896, a consortium of local business people promoted a local railway from Klagenfurt to Ferlach. However, these attempts were unsuccessful.

The pricing policy of the private Southern Railway Company, which had an effective monopoly on north–south traffic in Austria-Hungary, led the Imperial Council to make several attempts to authorise a second rail link to Trieste, all of which were unsuccessful. Only the Alpine Railway Act (Alpenbahngesetz), passed on 6 June 1901, enabled the construction of the so-called Neue Alpenbahnen (new Alpine railways). In the same year, construction began on the 7,976 m-long Karawanks Tunnel. From 1903, up to 4,500 people worked on the line from Villach (Villach–Rosenbach railway) and Klagenfurt. Overcoming the Sattnitz range and the rugged slopes of the Karawanks required the construction of several large bridges. In early May 1906, the Klagenfurt-Feistritz section was finally opened, and the rest of the line opened on September 30 of the same year. Ferlach was connected by the Ferlach Railway to the Rosen Valley Railway in the same year.

The new rail connection from the Rosen Valley led to growth in the local steel industry. In the year the railway opened, the Krainische Industriegesellschaft (Carniolan industrial company) took over the Feistritz works and expanded it over the next few years. The ironworks in Waidisch, Unterloibl and Ferlach combined to form the Kärntner Eisen- und Stahlwerksgesellschaft (Carinthian Iron and Steel Works company; KESTAG). The Rosen Valley Railway developed into an important north–south connection. In the summer of 1914, five pairs of express trains ran there every day.

After the end of the First World War and the 1920 Carinthian plebiscite, border changes led to changed traffic flows and the decline of the Rosen Valley Railway began. In October 1931, the last scheduled express train ran through the Rosen Valley, in 1933 the Krainische Industriegesellschaft closed its Feistritz works as a result of the Great Depression. During the Second World War, arms production at the Jungfer battery factory, which opened in Feistritz in 1939, led to a temporary traffic increase.

In the 1970s, the construction of the Ferlach reservoir led to initial considerations of closing the railway, because the bridge over the Drava would have been flooded at its planned capacity. Finally the bridge was raised and is now only 80 cm above the water level. With the closure of the Ferlach steelworks in the wake of the steel crisis and the closure of the Ferlach Railway in 1996, the railway lost a large part of its freight traffic. The freight loading points in Weizelsdorf and Feistritz im Rosental were closed in 2012. Since then, freight has only been loaded at Viktring goods yard.

The condition of the line between Klagenfurt and Rosenbach deteriorated increasingly. Until 2009, there were nine kilometres of low-speed track between Rosenbach and Klagenfurt, where the maximum speed was only 10 to 30 km/h. The travel time from Klagenfurt to Rosenbach was correspondingly long at over an hour. Without the speed limits, diverted long-distance passenger trains would only have needed around 25 to 30 minutes for the Klagenfurt–Rosenbach section, regional trains a good 40 minutes. In July 2009, however, this line was renovated and all 10 km/h speed limits were removed. Almost all sets of points and signals along the line were also dismantled.

From 1 August 2011 up to and including 9 December 2016, passenger traffic was limited to a single train, which only ran over the whole Rosenbach–Klagenfurt line on weekdays. The train left Rosenbach at 6:24 a.m. and arrived at Klagenfurt Hbf at 7:15 a.m.

The last remaining train on the Weizelsdorf–Rosenbach section was discontinued in December 2016. This step was justified by the low passenger traffic on the line and the need for investment to keep the line open. The closed section became the property of the state of Carinthia. The line between Weizeldorf and Feistritz was reopened for NBIK heritage trains In August 2020.

The Klagenfurt–Weizelsdorf section has been used by S-Bahn line S3 of the S-Bahn Kärnten (Carinthian S-Bahn) since the summer of 2011. Buses have been running from Weizelsdorf to Ferlach and parallel to the Rosen Valley Railway to Rosenbach or Ledenitzen (connecting to the S2) since then. For this purpose, Weizelsdorf station was modernised and a park and ride facility was built. Klagenfurt-Süd (south) station was opened and passenger traffic at Viktring station was discontinued in 2015.

== Operations ==
Since the 2008/09 timetable change, only Desiro (class 5022) railcars have been running on the line. The modest freight traffic was hauled by class 2068 or class 2016 locomotives.

During construction work or operational disruptions on the Villach–Rosenbach railway, the Rosen Valley Railway was also used as a diversion route at times, although rarely for international traffic. The line between St. Veit an der Glan and Klagenfurt is mainly used by passenger trains on the Vienna–Villach route.

On 9 December 2016, the last scheduled passenger train ran the entire length between Rosenbach via the Rosen Valley to Klagenfurt. Since then, all train traffic on the line between Rosenbach and Weizelsdorf has been suspended, and it is no longer included in the ÖBB rail network. In August 2020, the section between Weizelsdorf and Feistritz was reopened for tourist trains of the Nostalgiebahnen in Kärnten (Nostalgia Railways of Carinthia; NBIK). S-Bahn line 3 has been running on the section between Klagenfurt and Weizelsdorf every hour since 1 August 2011. Line S3 was extended to Völkermarkt-Kühnsdorf at the 2016/17 timetable change.

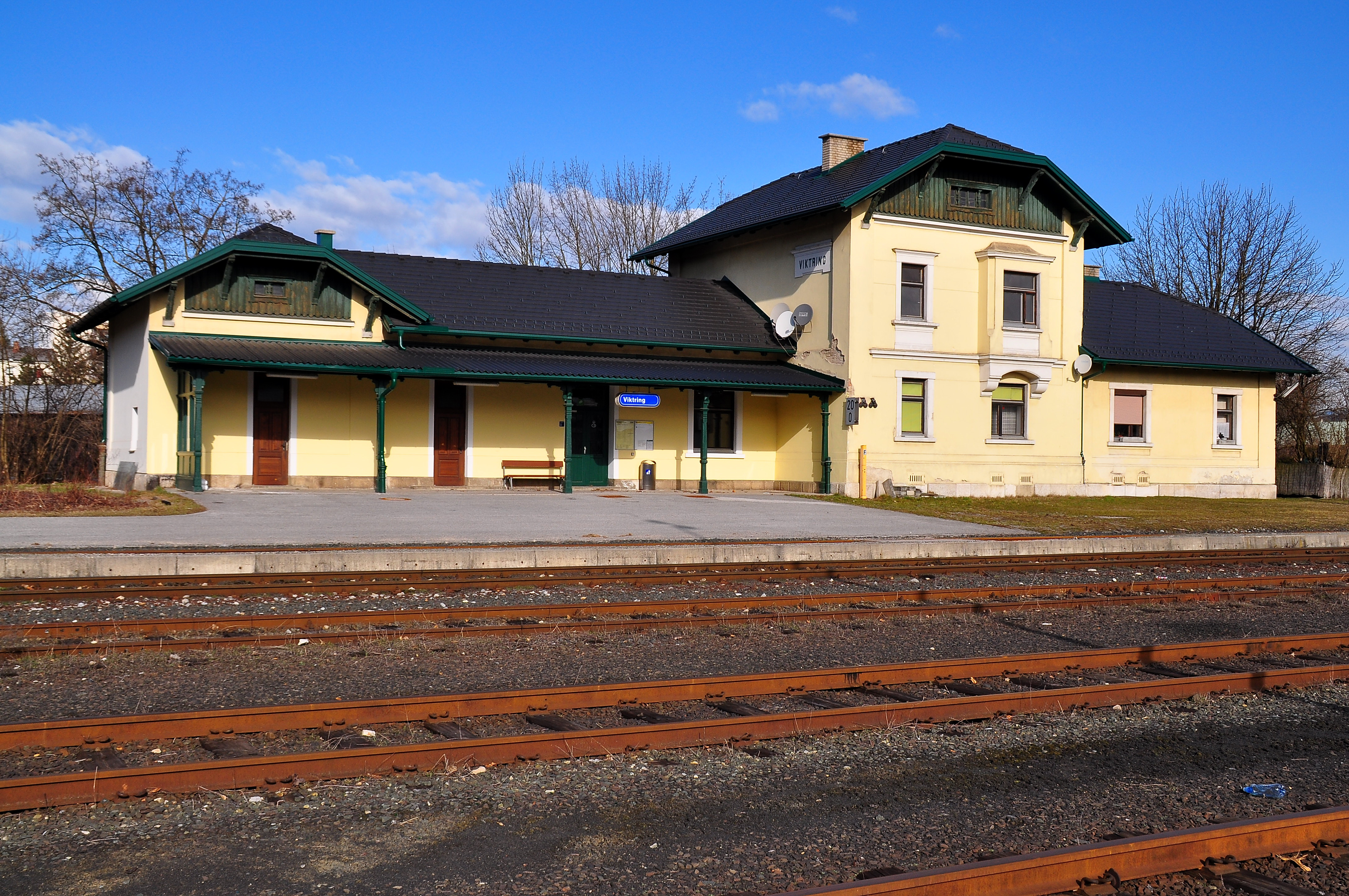
Viktring station in suburban Klagenfurt

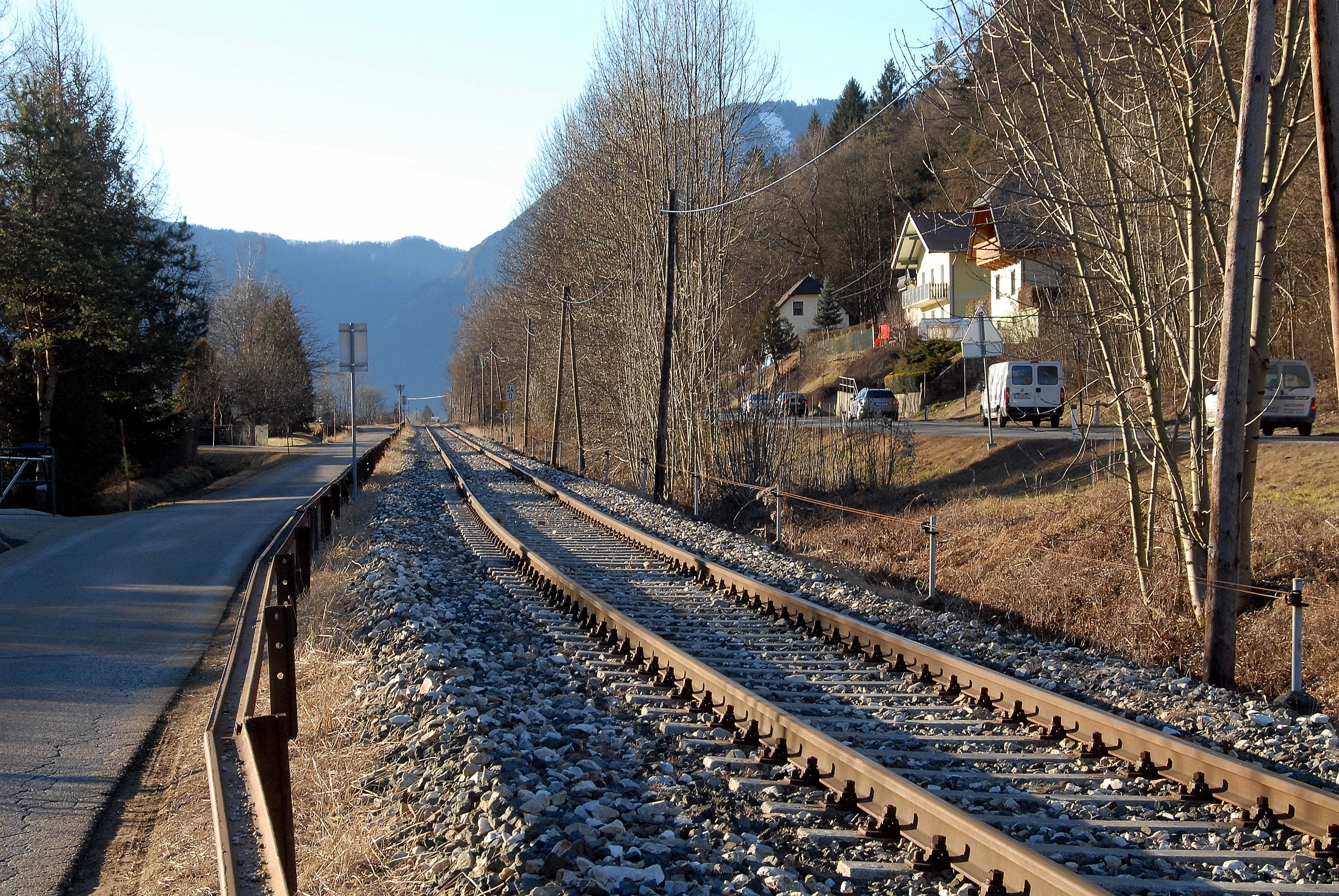
Railway line in Lambichl

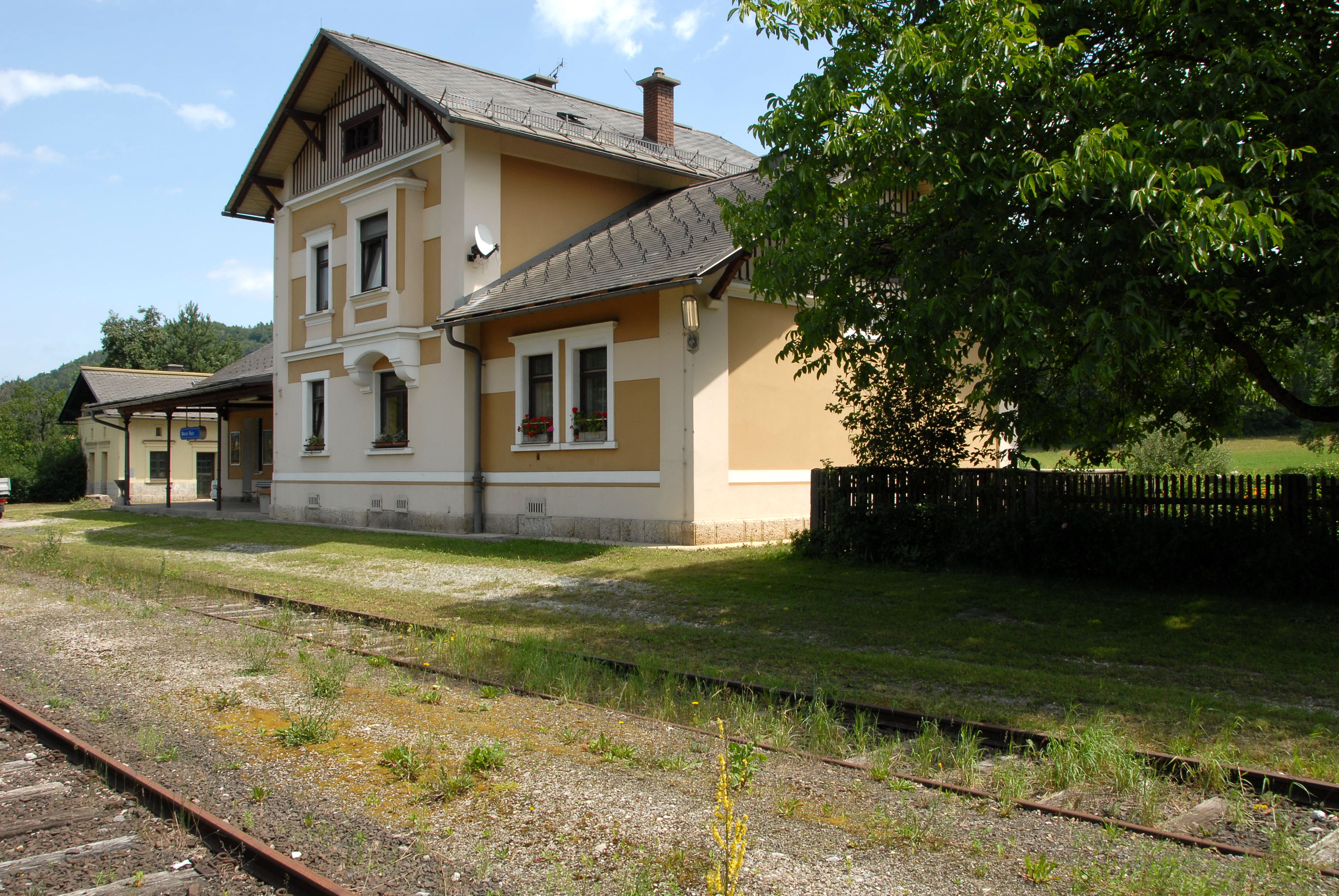
Maria Rain station

== Route description, freight traffic and electrification ==
The stations between Klagenfurt and Weizelsdorf are Mössingerstraße and Maria Rain, where all but one of the tracks were made unusable in the course of the work to adapt it for the S-Bahn line.

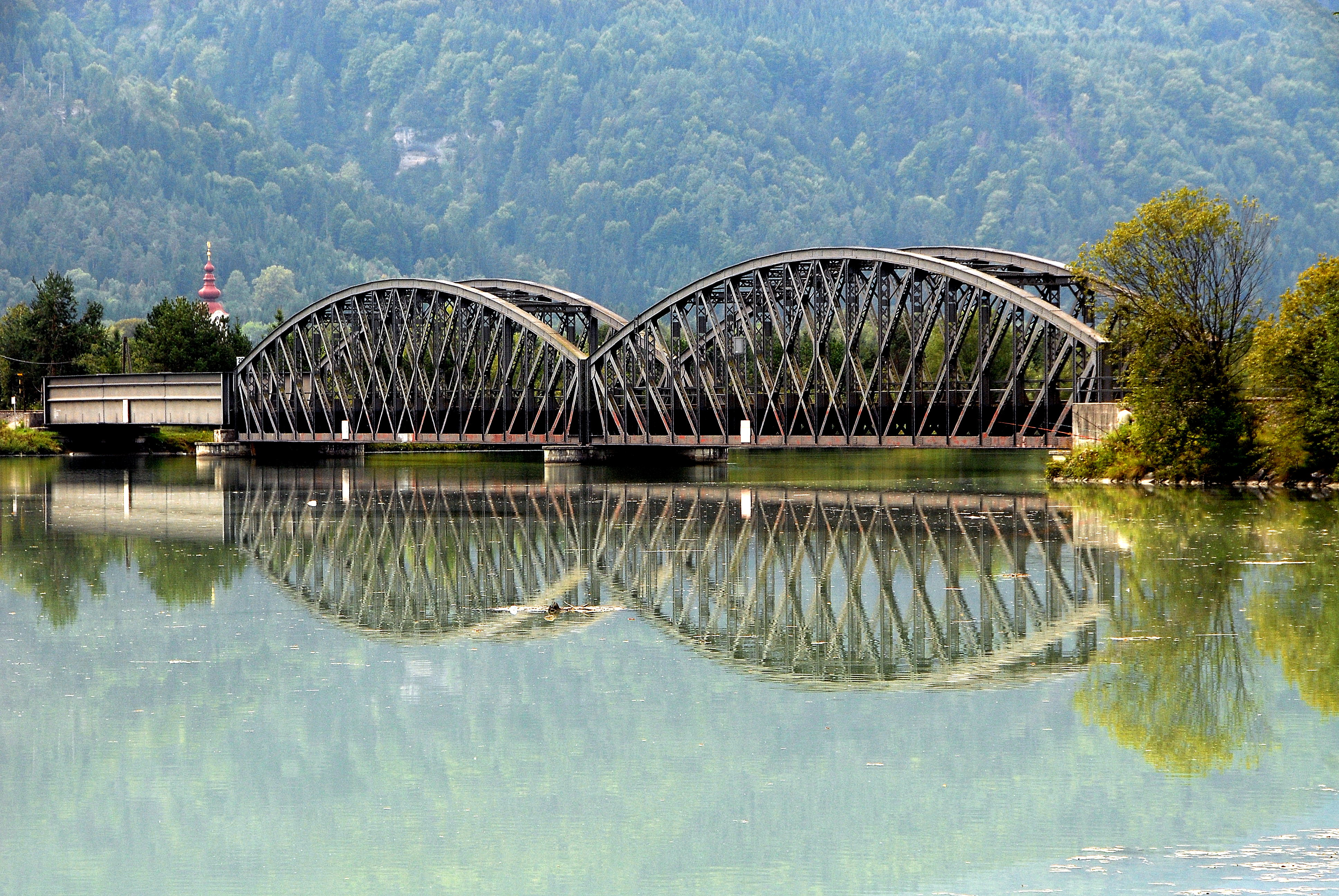
Railway bridge over Ferlach reservoir near Weizelsdorf

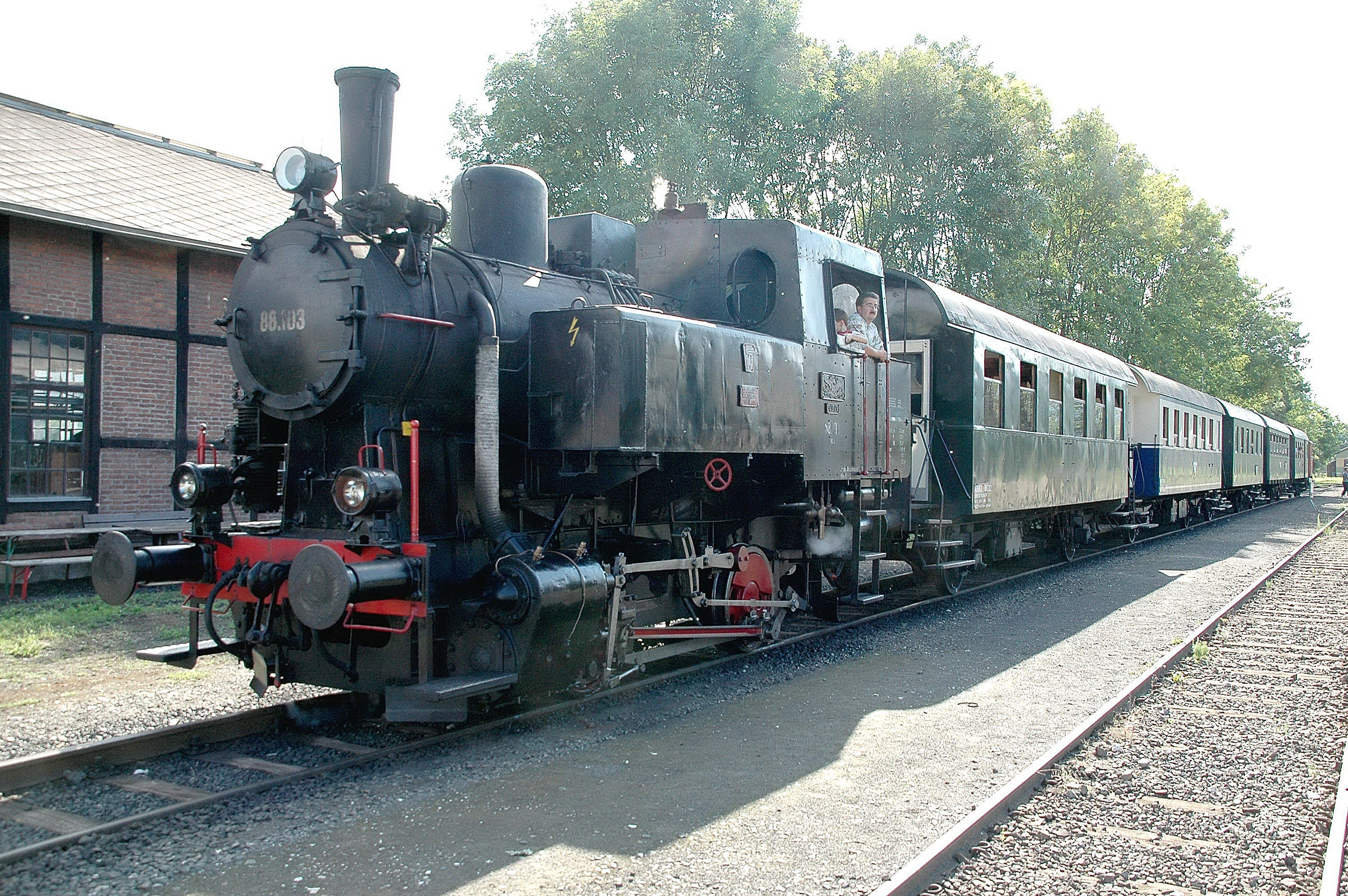
Rosen Valley railway steam train in Weizelsdorf station

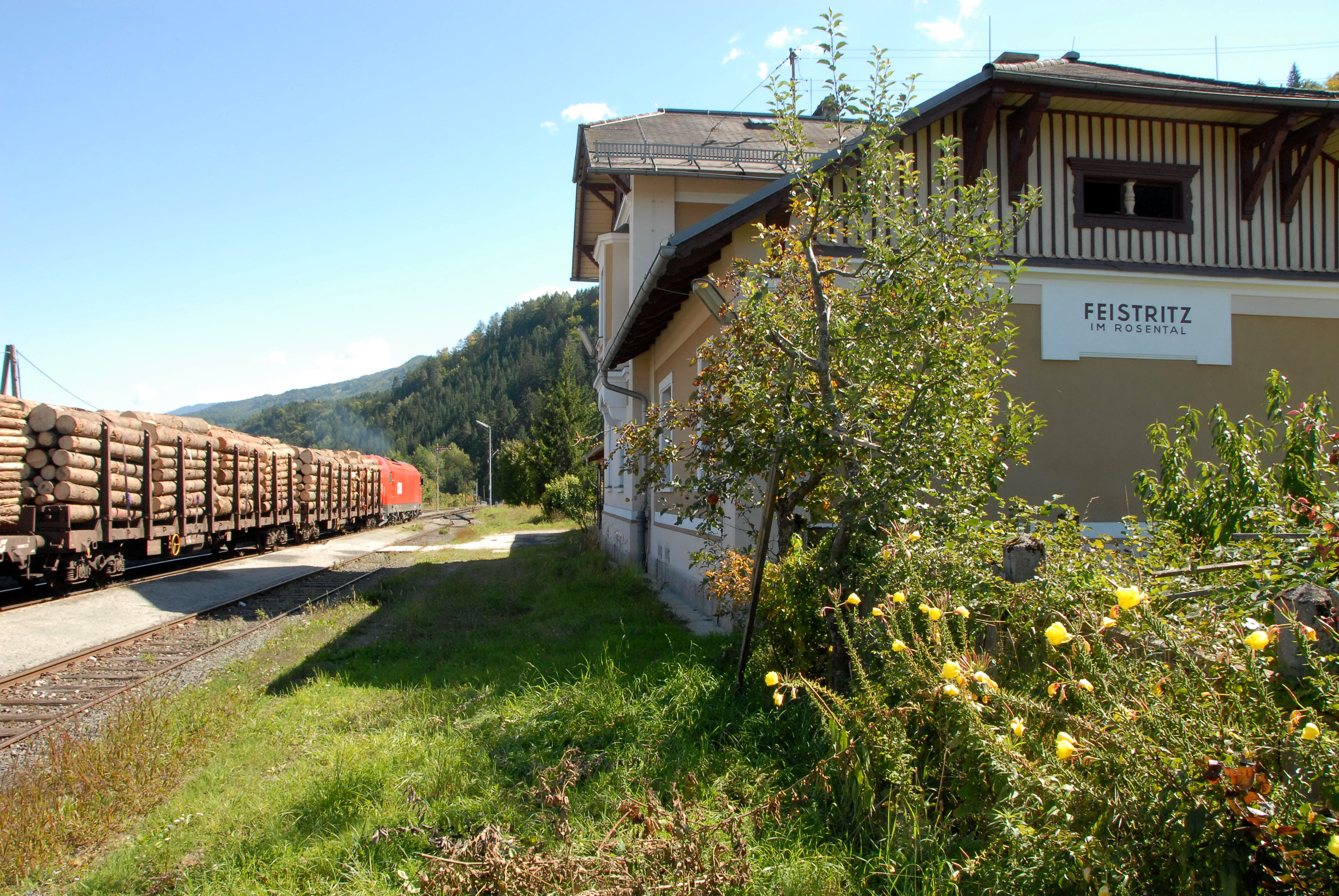
Feistritz im Rosental station

In the area of Feistritz im Rosental station there are industrial plants that once required a connection to the rail network. The journeys were scheduled to take place at lunchtime on weekdays (except Saturday). In addition to Feistritz station, Weizelsdorf station also played an important role for timber loading until a few years ago, when this work was taken only completely by road transport.

The overhead line electrified at 15 kV, 16.7 Hz extends from Rosenbach through the Karawanks tunnel to Jesenice station. The design of the overhead contact line in Slovenia corresponds to the Italian standard, since Italy had electrified the line when it held this part of Slovenia under the Treaty of Rapallo of 1920. The section from Klagenfurt to Rosenbach is not electrified. However, the ÖBB is planning to upgrade the Klagenfurt–Weizelsdorf line in the coming years. On 11 December 2016, at the 2016/2017 timetable change, all traffic between Rosenbach and Weizelsdorf was suspended, but the main tracks are to be retained for the time being. Tourist trains of the Nostalgiebahnen in Kärnten have been running between Weizelsdorf and Feistritz since August 2020.
