= Carinthia S-Bahn =

Rail transport system in Austria

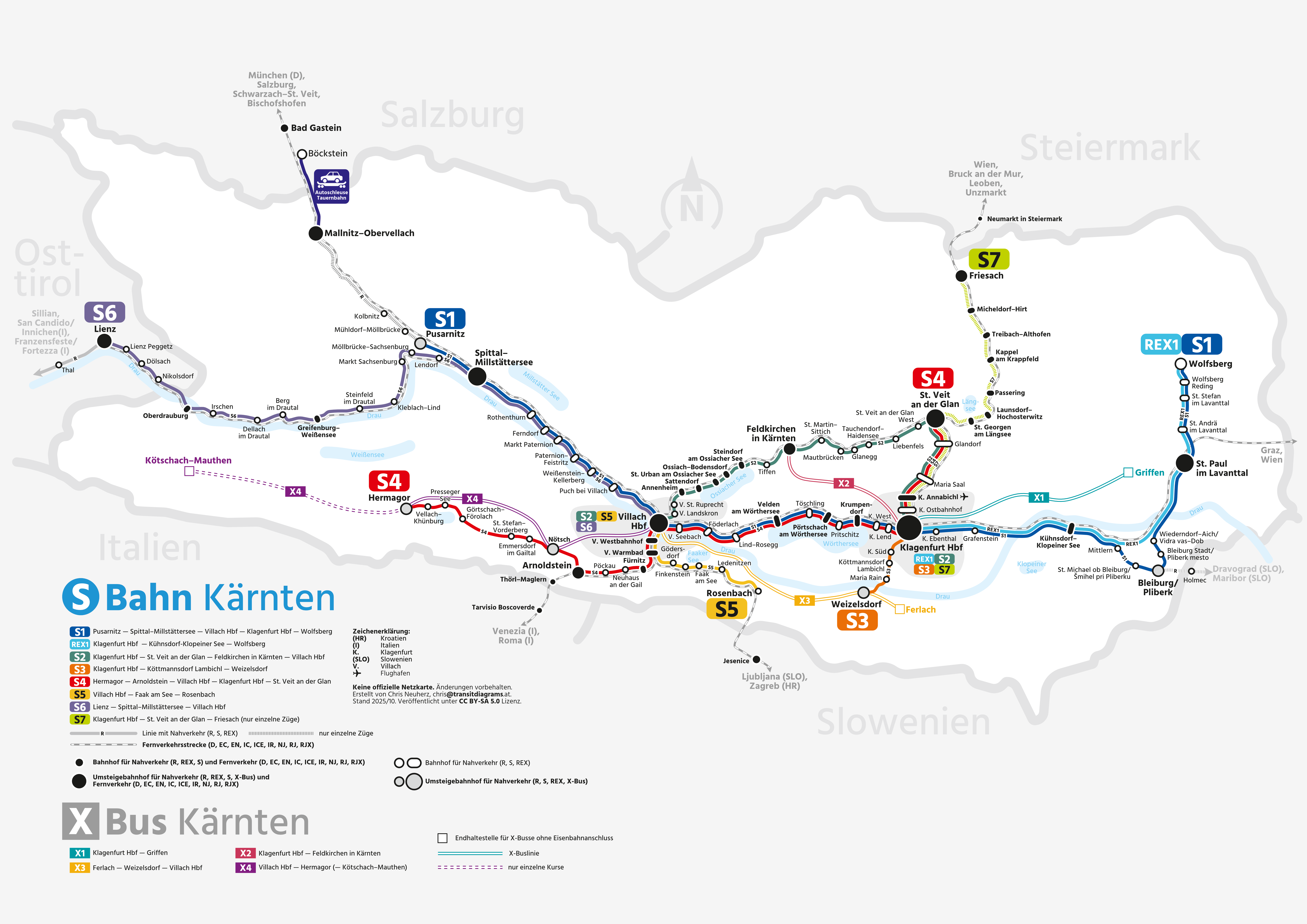
- Route map as of December 2022

Overview
- Locale: Carinthia
- Transit type: S-Bahn
- Number of lines: 5

Operation
- Began operation: 12 December 2010
- Operator: ÖBB

The Carinthia S-Bahn (German: S-Bahn Kärnten) is a regional transport system in the Austrian state of Carinthia and East Tyrol. The system is operated by the ÖBB, the national railway company.

== History ==
The Carinthia S-Bahn network was launched on 12 December 2010. The first line in operation was the S1, running hourly between Spittal-Millstättersee and Friesach via Klagenfurt, with a half-hourly frequency between Villach and St. Veit an der Glan. Two other lines were planned for 2011: the S2, running hourly between Rosenbach and St. Veit an der Glan via Feldkirchen; and the S3, running hourly between Feistritz im Rosental and Klagenfurt. Further expansion from Klagenfurt to Bleiburg depended on the construction of the Koralm Railway. The S3 began operation on 1 August 2011 between Klagenfurt and Weizelsdorf, with connecting bus service to Feistritz im Rosental and other destinations. The S2 began operating on 11 December 2011, with hourly service between Villach and Feldkirchen and service every two hours between Feldkirchen and St. Veit an der Glan.

The operation of the S2 south of Villach was delayed by the reconstruction of the drawbridge that carries the Rudolf railway line over the Drava river in Villach. The S2 began operating to Rosenbach on 10 June 2012. The S1 was extended west to Lienz on 13 December 2015. On 11 December 2016, ÖBB began running the S4 on an hourly schedule (every two hours on weekends) between Villach and Hermagor. The introduction of the S4 coincided with the closure of the Gail Valley railway line beyond Hermagor.

Three major changes occurred with the 9 December 2018 timetable. The S3 was formally extended east from Klagenfurt to Wolfsberg via Bleiburg, and two new weekend-only services were added: the S21, running from Villach to Jesenice (in Slovenia), and the S41, running from Villach to Tarvisio Boscoverde (in Italy). The two international services operated between June and September. On 12 December 2021, the section of the S2 south of Villach became the S5.

== Lines ==
As of the December 2022 timetable change, the Carinthia S-Bahn has five services. These are numbered S1 through S5, which is typical of S-Bahn networks. ÖBB operates all five services.

#	Route	Frequency
Carinthia S-Bahn	Lienz–Spittal-Millstättersee–Villach–Klagenfurt–St. Veit an der Glan–Freisach	Hourly, with additional services between Klagenfurt and St. Veit an der Glan
Carinthia S-Bahn	Villach–Feldkirchen in Kärnten (–St. Veit an der Glan)	Hourly between Villach and Feldkirchen and every two hours between Feldkirchen and St. Veit an der Glan
Carinthia S-Bahn	Klagenfurt–Weizelsdorf	Weekday-only hourly service
Carinthia S-Bahn	Klagenfurt–Wolfsberg	Service suspended because of construction work
Carinthia S-Bahn	Hermagor–Arnoldstein–Villach	Hourly service
Carinthia S-Bahn	Villach–Rosenbach	Hourly service
