= Klagenfurt Hauptbahnhof =

Railway station in Carinthia, Austria

Klagenfurt Hbf
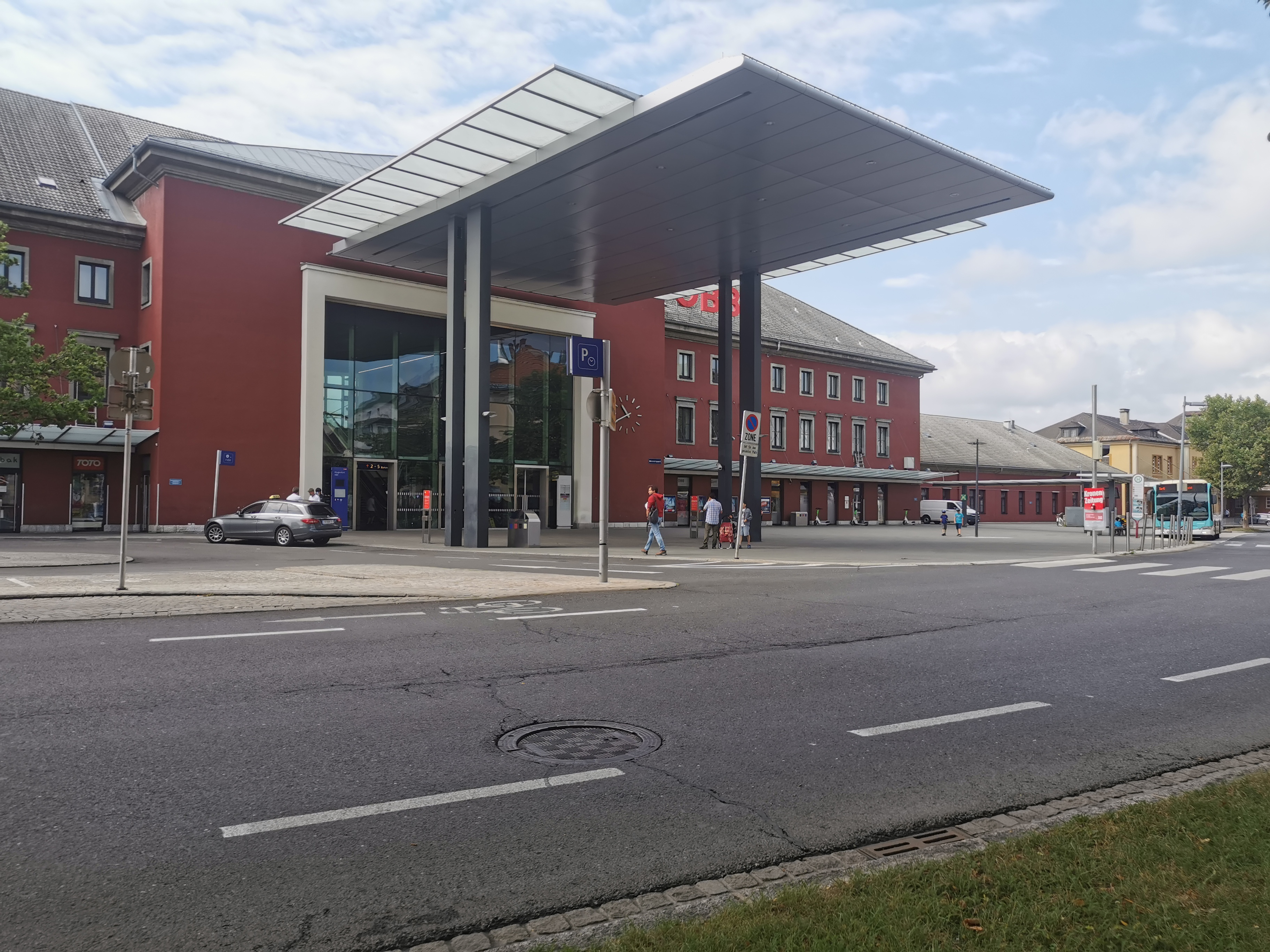
- Station building after renovation

General information
- Location: Walter-von-der-Vogelweide-Platz 1; 9020 Klagenfurt; Austria
- Coordinates: 46°36′57″N 14°18′48″E
- Owner: Austrian Federal Railways (ÖBB)
- Operator: Austrian Federal Railways (ÖBB)
- Lines: Rosen Valley Railway; Drava Valley Railway
- Platforms: 6
- Connections: Airport: Train: IR to Bruck/Mur or Graz Hbf, S2 to Villach Hbf, S4 to St. Veit/Glan – "Klagenfurt Annabichl"; Bus: Line 4 – "Flughafen/Airport"; S-Bahn: S1, S2, S3, S4, S7; Bus: Klagenfurt Mobil GmbH Lines A, C, 4, 6, 7

Other information
- IATA code: KGV

Services
Preceding station	ÖBB	Following station
Krumpendorf/Wörthersee towards München Hbf	Railjet	Terminus
Velden am Wörther See towards Venezia Santa Lucia	Railjet	St. Veit an der Glan towards Wien Hbf
Villach Hbf Terminus	Railjet	St. Veit an der Glan towards Wien Hbf
Pörtschach am Wörther See towards Vienna Airport	Railjet	Terminus
Krumpendorf/Wörthersee towards Frankfurt (Main) Hbf	EuroCity	Terminus
Pörtschach am Wörther See towards Lienz	InterCity	St. Veit an der Glan towards Wien Hbf
Pörtschach am Wörther See towards Villach Hbf	InterCity	St. Veit an der Glan towards Wien Hbf
Pörtschach am Wörther See towards Salzburg Hbf	InterCity	Terminus
Villach Hbf towards Roma Termini or La Spezia Centrale	Nightjet	St. Veit an der Glan towards Wien Hbf
Preceding station	DB Fernverkehr	Following station
Pörtschach am Wörther See towards Frankfurt (Main) Hbf or Münster Hbf	ICE 62	Graz Hbf Terminus
Pörtschach am Wörther See towards München Hbf	EC 62	Terminus
Preceding station	Carinthia S-Bahn	Following station
Klagenfurt West towards Lienz	S1	Klagenfurt Ost towards Friesach
Klagenfurt Süd towards Weizelsdorf	S3	Klagenfurt Ebenthal towards Wolfsberg
Location
- Location within Austria Location within Europe

Klagenfurt Hauptbahnhof (German for Klagenfurt Main station; occasionally translated as Klagenfurt Central Station) is the main railway station in Klagenfurt, capital of the Austrian state of Carinthia. It is an important railway junction in southern Austria.

== History ==
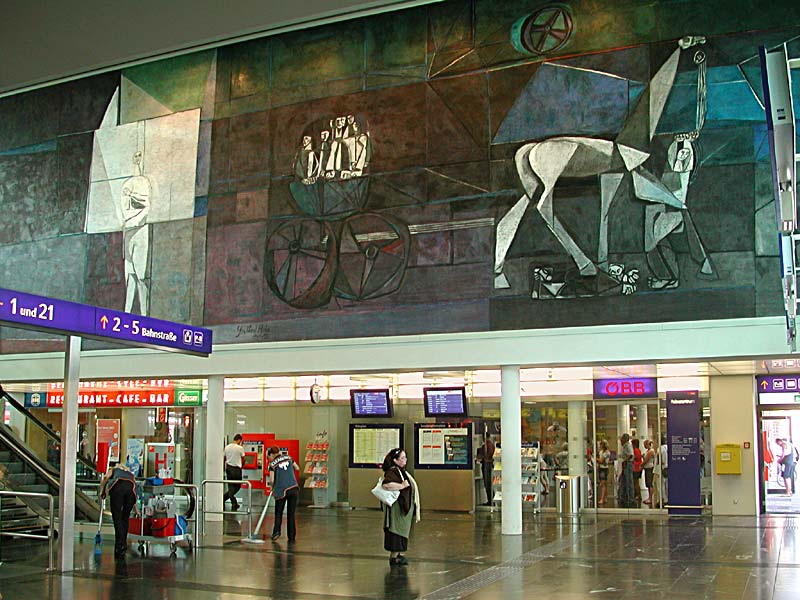
Interior

The station opened on 1 June 1863, when Klagenfurt received connection to the Southern Railway, one of the main train routes within the Austrian Empire, via the Carinthian branch line to Marburg, Styria (now part of the Drava Valley Railway). One year later, the line was extended to Villach Hauptbahnhof, which quickly superseded Klagenfurt as major Carinthian transportation hub with rail connections to the Brenner Railway at Franzensfeste and the Tarvisio–Udine railway (Pontebbana line) at Tarvisio. In 1906, Klagenfurt received access to the Rosen Valley Railway running from Sankt Veit an der Glan via the Karawanks Tunnel to Assling (Jesenice) in Carniola (present-day Slovenia).

The railway premises located in the present-day district of Sankt Ruprecht south of the city centre were not incorporated into Klagenfurt until 1938. Severely damaged by strategic bombing during World War II the station had to be demolished and completely rebuilt. The reception hall was adorned with a large fresco, created by the (local) artist Giselbert Hoke (1927–2015) in the style of Pablo Picasso and completed in 1956. The station was extensively renovated from 2002 until November 2015.

== Train services ==
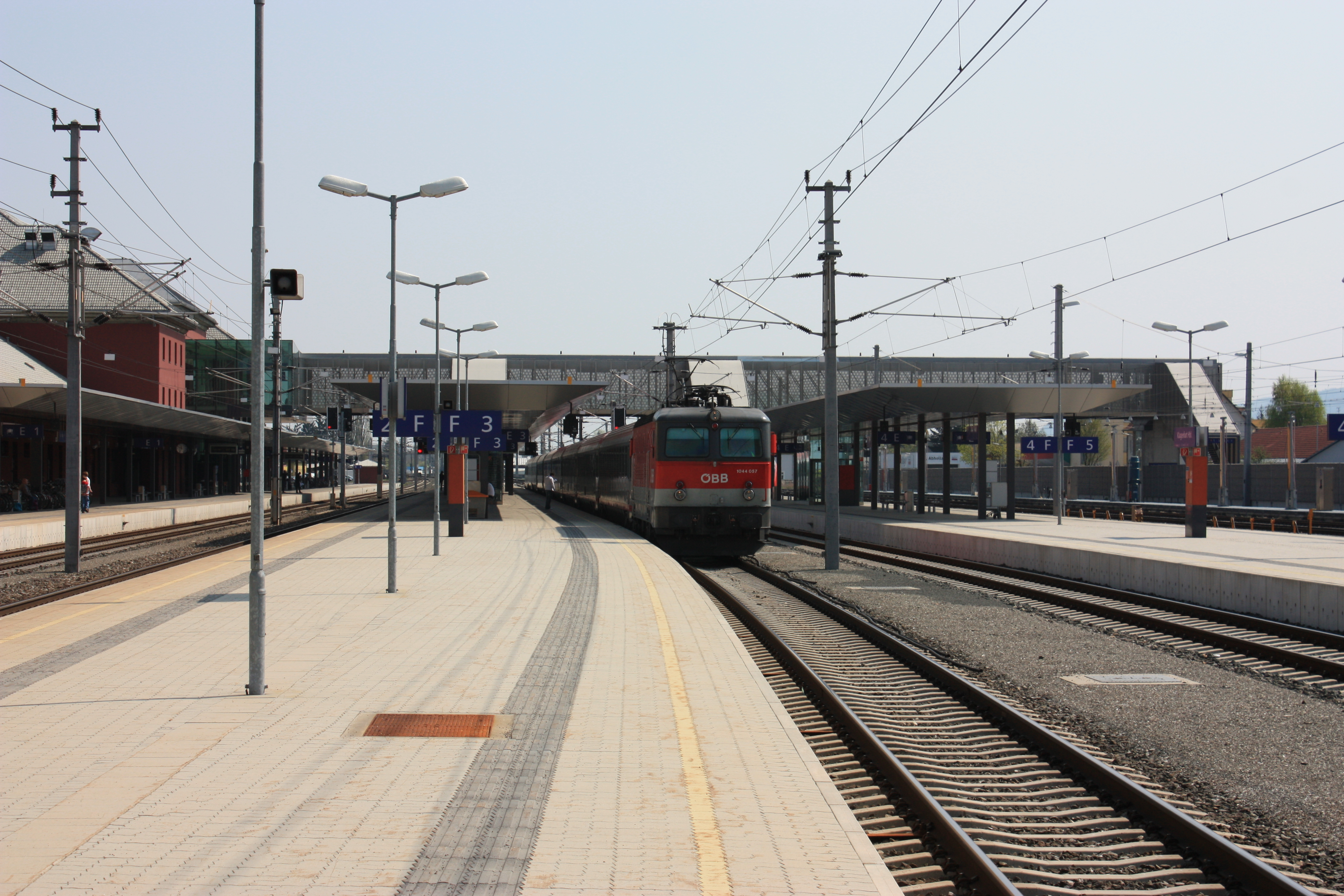
ÖBB Class 1044 at the platform (2009)

Operated by the Austrian Federal Railways (ÖBB), Klagenfurt station connects to the Drautal (Drava Valley) and Rosental Railway lines. The Koralm Railway, a direct high-speed connection to the Styrian capital Graz via the 32.9 km (20.4 mi) long Koralm Tunnel is currently under construction. Part of the Pan-European Baltic-Adriatic Corridor, it is scheduled to be operational in 2026.

The station is currently served by the following train connections:

- Railjet services Lienz – Villach – Klagenfurt – Vienna
- InterCity services Klagenfurt – Salzburg – Linz – Vienna
- Intercity-Express services Frankfurt/Münster – Munich – Salzburg – Villach – Klagenfurt
- EuroCity services Munich – Salzburg – Villach – Klagenfurt
- Railjet services Klagenfurt – Villach – Tarvisio – Udine – Venice
- EuroNight services Rome/Livorno – Florence – Bologna – Venice – Villach – Klagenfurt – Vienna

Beside long-distance traffic, Klagenfurt is served by ÖBB Regional-Express and Regionalbahn trains. It is also a railway hub of the Carinthian S-Bahn network.

== See also ==
- Rail transport in Austria
- History of rail transport in Austria
