= Kranj railway station =

Railway station in City Municipality of Kranj, Slovenia

Kranj
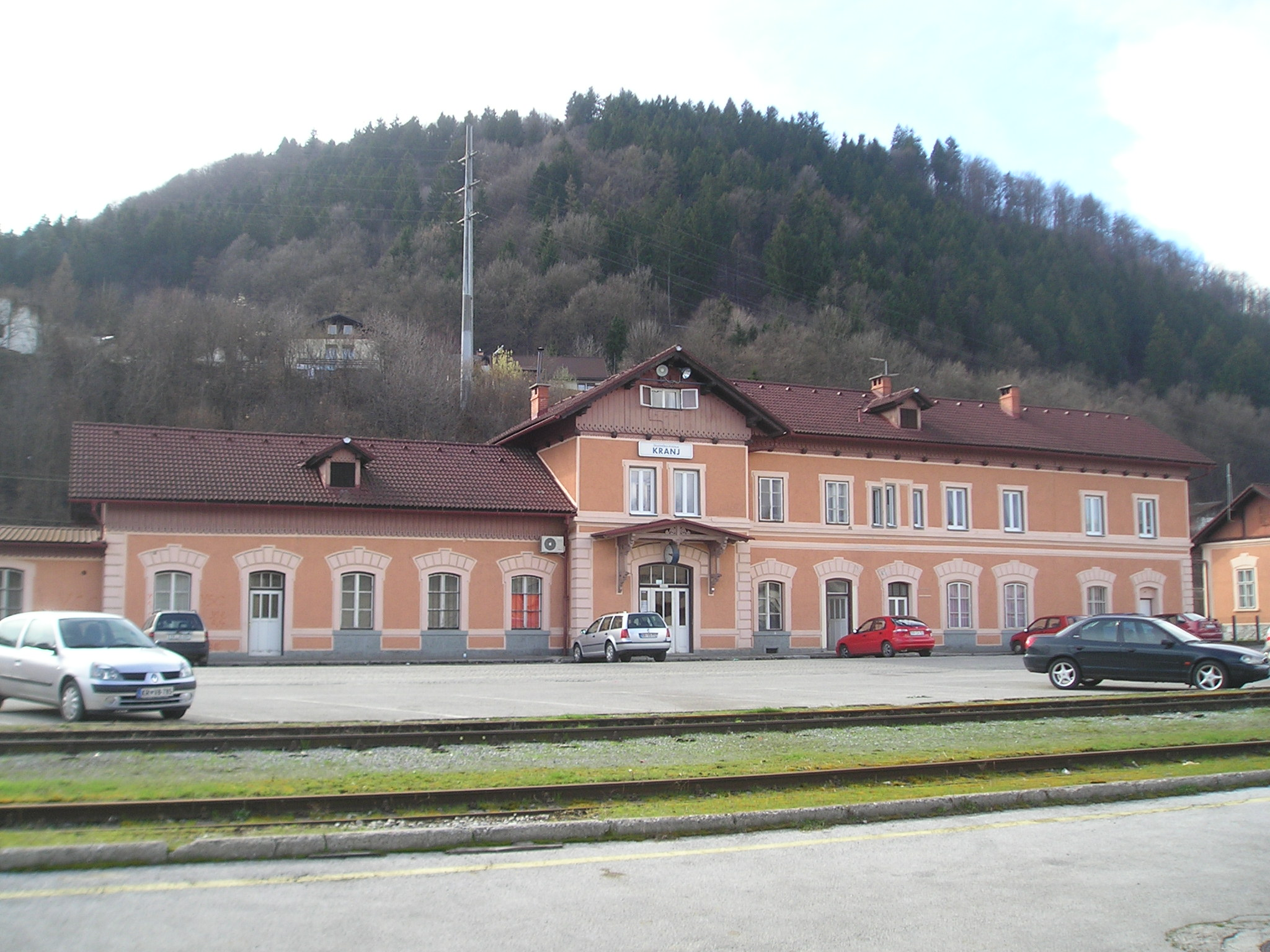

General information
- Location: Kolodvorska Cesta; 4000 Kranj; Slovenia
- Coordinates: 46°14′20″N 14°20′54″E
- Owner: Slovenske železnice
- Operator: Slovenske železnice

Services
Preceding station	Croatian Railways	Following station
Lesce-Bled towards Zürich HB or Stuttgart Hbf	EuroNight	Ljubljana towards Zagreb
Location
- Location within Slovenia

Kranj railway station (Slovene: Železniška postaja Kranj) is the railway station in Kranj, the third largest municipality and fourth largest city in Slovenia. The station is located on the railway line between Ljubljana, the capital city of Slovenia, and Villach, Austria.
