= Jesenice railway station =

Railway station in Jesenice, Slovenia

Jesenice
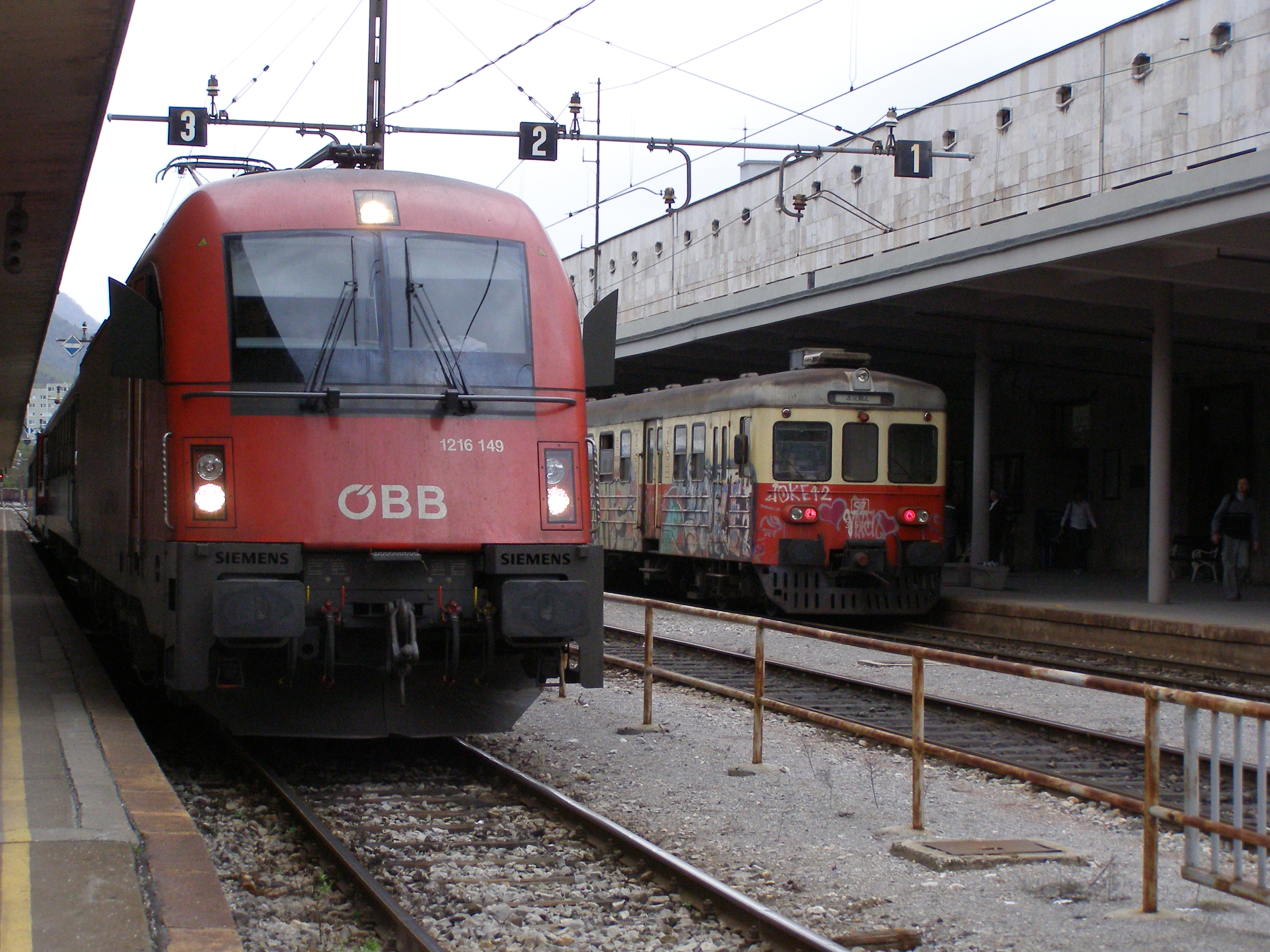
- ÖBB and SŽ trains at the Jesenice railway station

General information
- Location: 19 Marshal Tito Street (Cesta Maršala Tita 19); 4270 Jesenice, Upper Carniola; Slovenia
- Coordinates: 46°26′11″N 14°03′17″E
- Owner: Slovenske železnice
- Operator: Slovenske železnice

History
- Rebuilt: 1953-1955

Services
Preceding station	Croatian Railways	Following station
Villach Hbf towards Zürich HB or Stuttgart Hbf	EuroNight	Lesce-Bled towards Zagreb
Location
- Location within Slovenia

The Jesenice railway station (Slovene: Železniška postaja Jesenice) is a railway station in the town of Jesenice, in northwestern Slovenia. It is operated by Slovenian Railways (SŽ).

== Characteristics ==
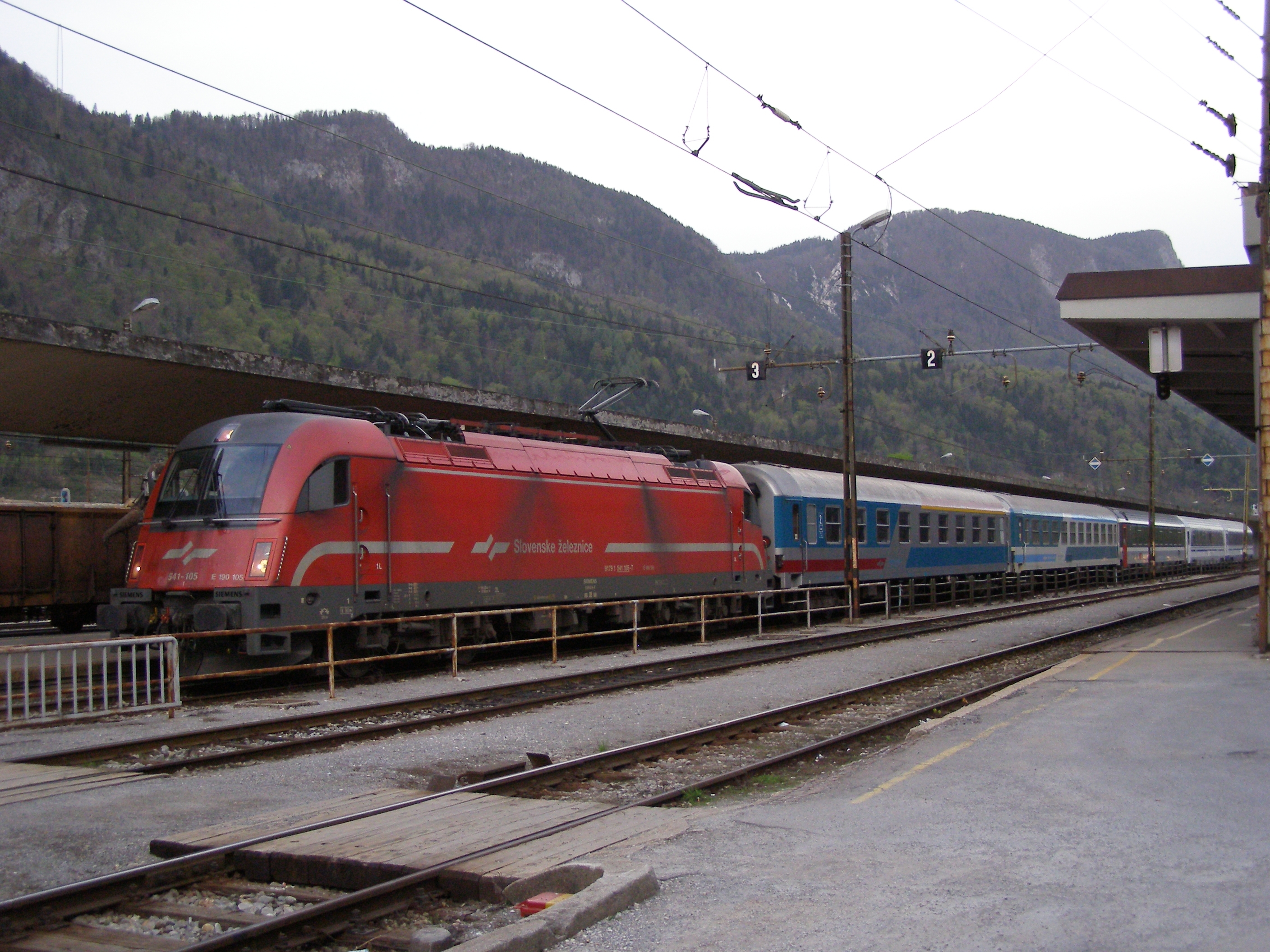
SŽ Taurus passenger train

The station is located in the Sava Dolinka valley, close to the borders with Austria in the north and with Italy in the west. It is the current northern terminus of the Bohinj Railway from Trieste, and also of the Tarvisio–Ljubljana Railway after the section to Tarvisio has been closed in 1967/69. From Jesenice, the Karawanks Railway line runs northwards, across the Austrian border in the Karawanks Tunnel opened in 1906, to Villach Hauptbahnhof.

In addition to the station facilities, the building contains a bar, shops, and a restaurant. The two boarding platforms are connected by an underground pedestrian tunnel.

== Destinations ==
Destinations served from the station are:

- Rosenbach (Slovene: Podrožca) and Villach (Slovene: Beljak) on the mainline to the north (both in Austria, via Karawanks Tunnel)
- Kranj and Ljubljana on the Tarvisio-Ljubljana Railway line to the south-east
- Bohinj and Nova Gorica on the Bohinj line to the south-west

== History ==
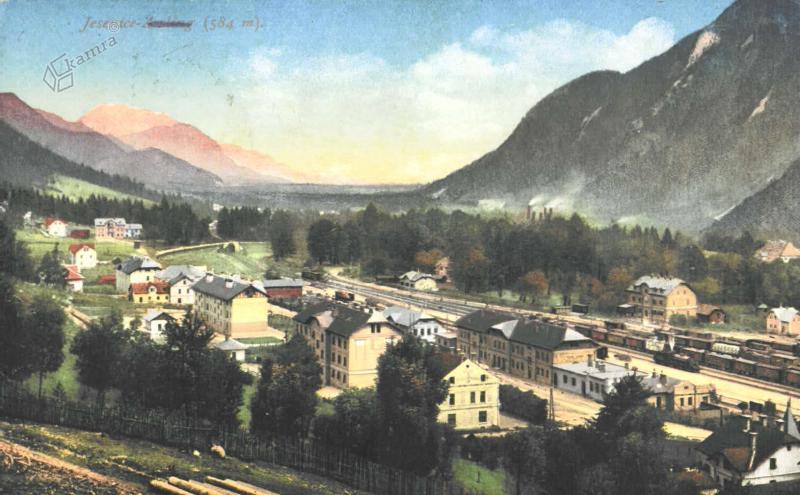
Jesenice station, c. 1910

The station opened in 1870 as a stop on the Tarvisio-Ljubljana Railway. In 1906, it became a junction when two main lines of the Cisleithanian "New Alpine Railways" project were completed: the Bohinj Railway (Wocheinerbahn) to Trieste and the Karawanks Tunnel to Villach and the present-day Austrian Rosental line to Sankt Veit.

The station was rebuilt between 1953 and 1955 upon plans designed by Stanislav Rohrman to replace a prewar structure destroyed by Allied air raids in early 1945, when the Upper Carniola region was occupied by German Wehrmacht forces. Architecturally, the new building is unusually distinctive for a train station in the area, being a stark modernist box faced in white marble and featuring hexagonal windows.

== See also ==
- Rail transport in Slovenia
