= Tarvisio–Ljubljana Railway =

International railway line between Italy and Slovenia

Coordinates: 46.4791°N 13.8706°E

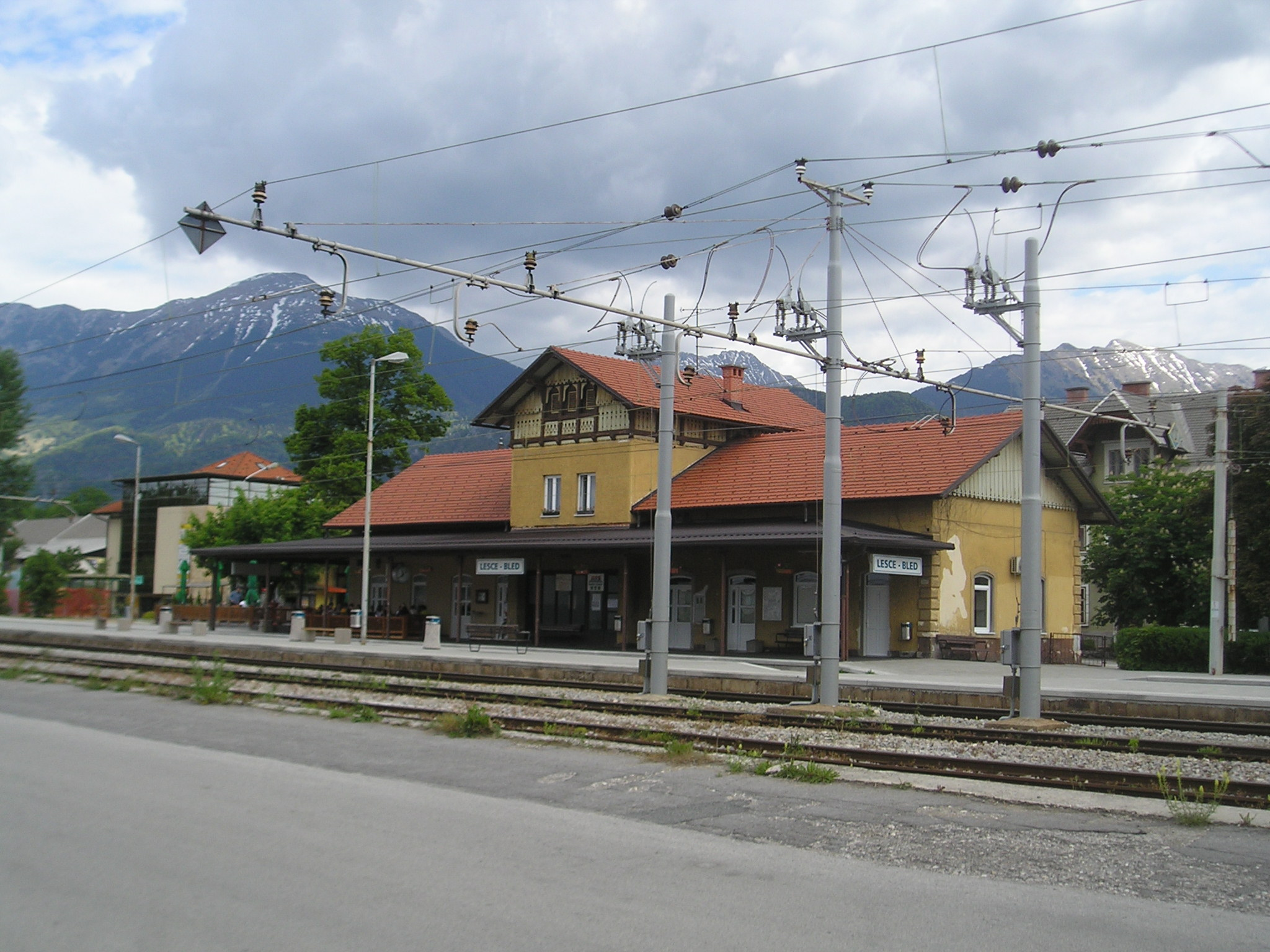
- The Lesce-Bled train station

Overview
- Native name: Železniška proga Ljubljana-Jesenice
- Status: partly opened to traffic
- Locale: Slovenia, formerly Italy

Service
- Route number: 20
- Operator: Slovenian Railways

History
- Opened: 14 December 1870

Technical
- Line length: 64.5 km (originally 103.7 km)
- Track gauge: 1,435 mm (4 ft 8 1/2 in)
- Electrification: 3 kV DC
- Operating speed: 100 km/h (62 mph)

The Tarvisio–Ljubljana Railway (Slovene: Železniška proga Ljubljana - Jesenice) is a partially closed to traffic international railway line between Italy and Slovenia. It was opened in 1870 as part of the Austro-Hungarian Rudolfsbahn railway network. Today, only the Slovenian section between Jesenice and Ljubljana is still open to traffic, as part of the main line between Ljubljana and Villach in Austria; the cross-border section between Jesenice and Tarvisio has been closed to traffic since 1967 (Italian part) and 1969 (Slovenian part).

== History ==
=== Construction and first years ===
In 1869, the Kaiserlich-königliche privilegierte Kronprinz Rudolf-Bahn Gesellschaft (KRB, Imperial and Royal privileged company of the Crown Prince Rudolf railway), that had been formed for the construction and operation of the Rudolfsbahn railway line from St. Valentin to Tarvisio, received the concession to build a railway line linking Tarvisio and Ljubljana. The projected railway would follow the Sava valley from Ljubljana to Assling (now Jesenice) and Kronau (Kranjska Gora), then reach Tarvisio through Fusine in Valromana.

The railway line was opened on 14 December 1870.

In the first years of service, the end station in Tarvisio was located in an area south-west of the current Tarvisio Boscoverde station. A new station, the current Tarvisio Centrale, was opened when the railway line from Villach was inaugurated in 1873, and the Ljubljana line was connected to it, leading to disaffection of the first station, who was then known as Alt Tarvis (Old Tarvisio).

In 1884, following financial crisis of the KRB, the railway was nationalised. It was therefore operated by the Imperial Royal Austrian State Railways, who proceeded to modernise the line.

In 1906, the station of Jesenice became a junction when two segments of the New Alpine Railways met there: the Bohinj Railway to Trieste and the Karawanks Railway to Villach. As the latter opened two months later, during a brief period, the trans-alpine trains from Villach to Trieste used the Tarvisio–Ljubljana line between Tarvisio and Jesenice.

=== Between the two World Wars ===
Following the Treaty of Saint-Germain-en-Laye, the railway was divided between Italy and the new Kingdom of Serbs, Croats and Slovenes (Yugoslavia from 1929). The lined crossed the border near the station of Fusine Laghi. The end station of Tarvis, rebaptised Tarvisio Sobborghi, then Tarvisio Centrale by its new owner, the Italian State Railways (FS), became an international border station. Both passenger and goods traffic between Tarvisio and the border was operated by the National Railways of the Kingdom of Serbs, Croats and Slovenes, that would become the Yugoslav Railways (JDŽ), but the infrastructure were owned and managed by the FS. Beyond the border, the JDŽ had both ownership and operation of the line.

=== After World War II ===
After World War II, and following the consequent closing of the Yugoslav border, traffic strongly decreased on the Italian segment of the line, and stopped completely in 1965. A presidential decree officially closed the line on 14 August 1967. The tracks were removed in the 1980s. The Yugoslav segment between Jesenice and the border was officially closed in 1969. In recent years, part of the path in the Slovenian Upper Sava Valley has been reclaimed as a bicycle trail.

== Characteristics and operation ==
The line was originally 103.7 km, from the railway station of Tarvisio Centrale to that of Ljubljana. The remaining part from Jesenice to Ljubljana is 64.5 km long. It is a single-track line, electrified with 3 kV DC. Only the short section between the Ljubljana Šiška marshalling yards and the Ljubljana railway station is double-track.

It is exploited by Slovenian Railways, the national railway operator of Slovenia. National passenger trains use the line between Ljubljana and Jesenice, while international services carry on to Villach and Vienna Meidling railway station.

== Sources ==
- Denis Carlutti, La ferrovia Tarvisio-Fusine-Jesenice.
- Ignaz Konta (1898). Geschichte der Eisenbahn Oesterreichs vom Jahre 1867 bis zur Gegenwart. Geschichte der Eisenbahnen der Oesterreichisch-Ungarischen Monarchie (in German). Vol. 1. Wien / Teschen / Leipzig: Karl Prochaska. pp. 1–426.
- Dietmar Rauter; Herwig Rainer (1998). Ein Verkehrsweg erschließt die Alpen, 2, Die Nebenbahnen der k.k.priv.Kronprinz Rudolf-Bahn (in German). Santk Peter ob Judenburg: Verlag Mlakar.
