= Villach Hauptbahnhof =

Railway station in Carinthia, Austria

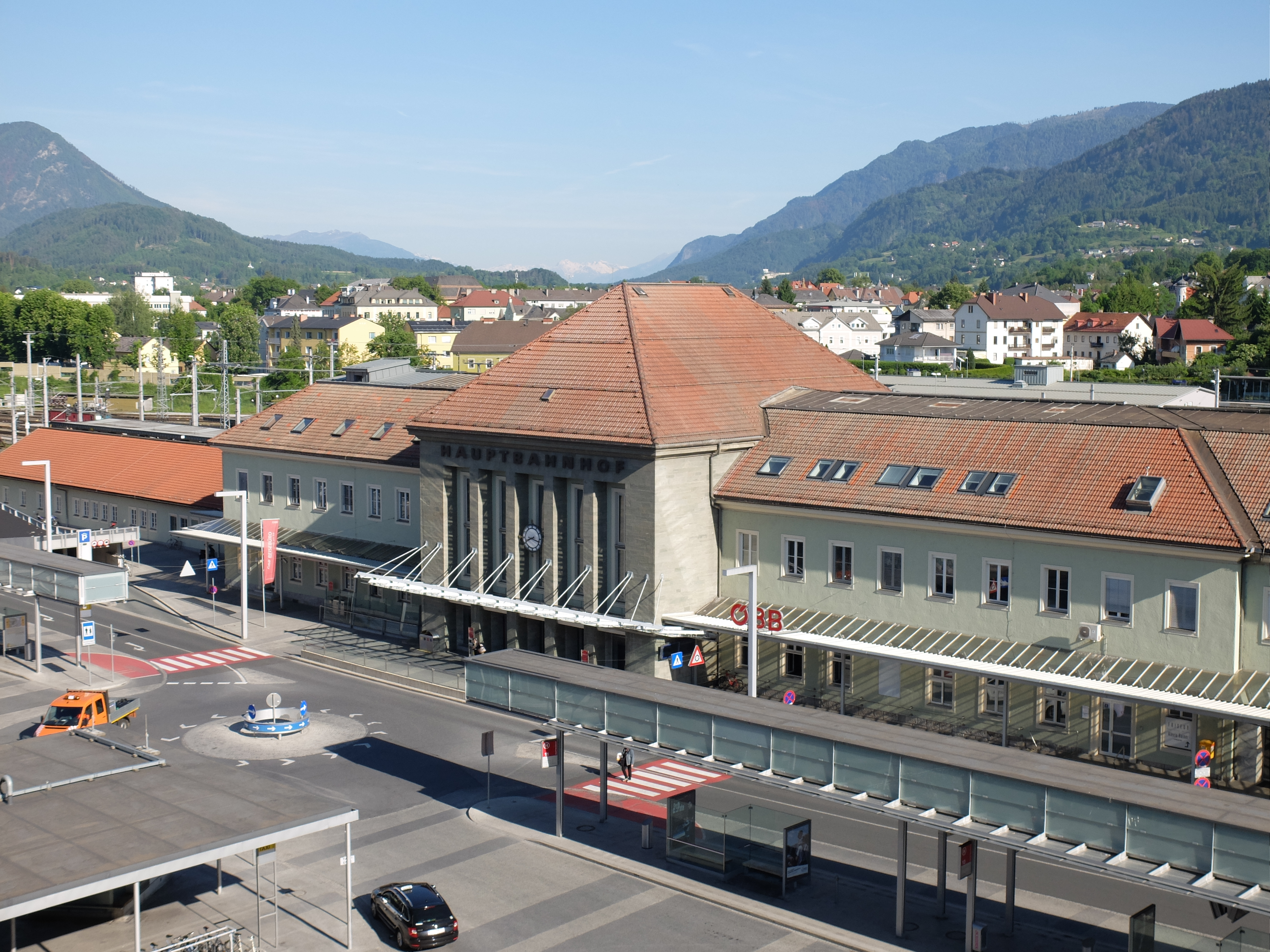
- Station building

General information
- Location: Bahnhofplatz; 9500 Villach; Austria
- Coordinates: 46°37′6″N 13°50′54″E
- Owner: Austrian Federal Railways (ÖBB)
- Operator: Austrian Federal Railways (ÖBB)
- Lines: Rosen Valley Railway; Drava Valley Railway
- Platforms: 12
Location
- Location within Austria

Villach Hauptbahnhof ('Villach Central Station') is the main railway station in Villach, the second largest city in the Austrian state of Carinthia. It primarily serves as a passenger station and is an important junction within the Austrian Federal Railways (ÖBB) network.

== Operational usage ==
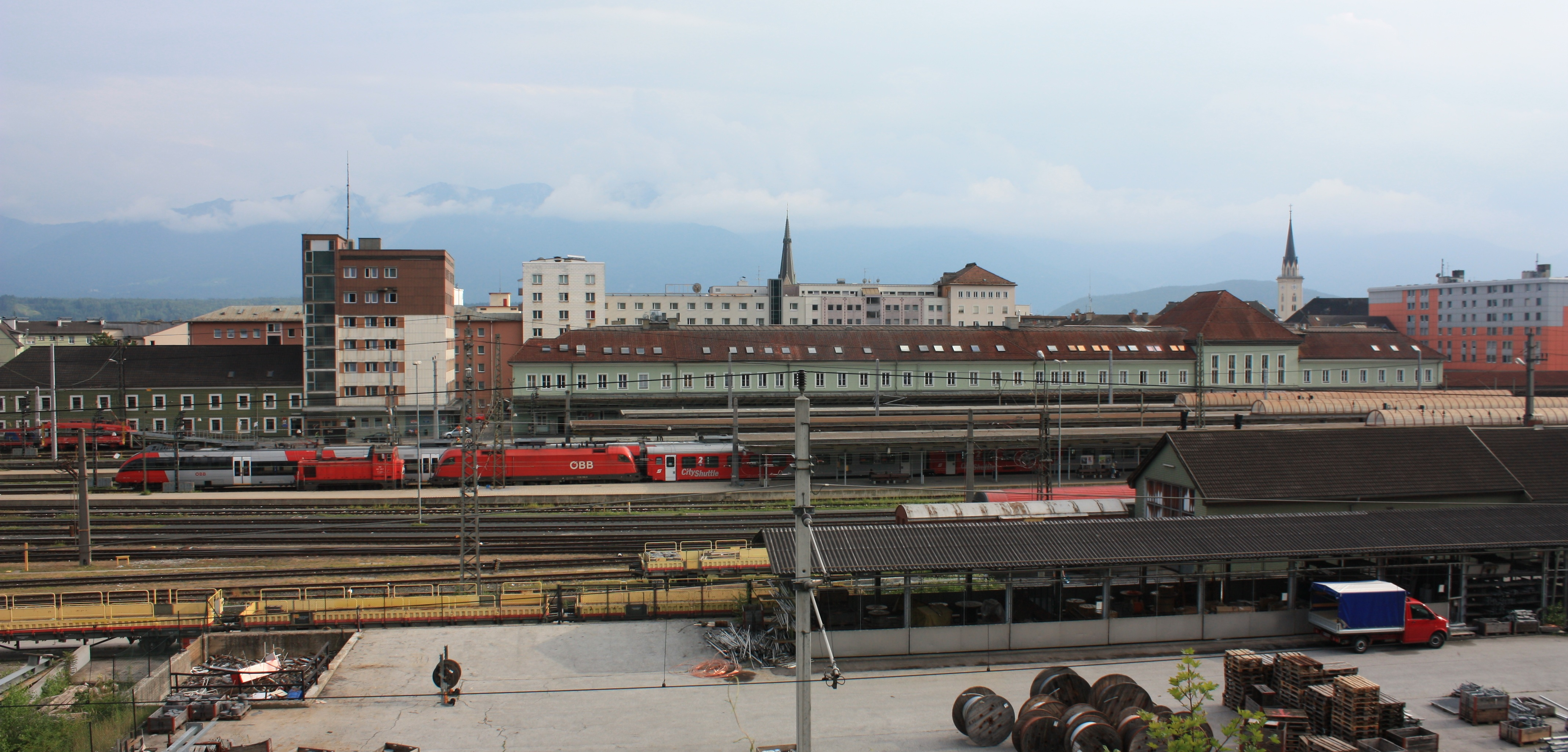
Railway tracks

The station has twelve tracks, four of them sidings, and a motorail terminal. It is linked with both to the Southern Railway line to Vienna and the Tauern Railway line towards Salzburg.

Villach is served by Austrian Railjet, InterCity and Regional-Express trains, as well as by the Carinthian S-Bahn rapid transit system. The station also hosts international EuroCity and EuroNight trains leading to destinations like Munich, Ljubljana and Zagreb, or to Venezia Santa Lucia via Tarvisio Boscoverde and Udine.

== Train services ==
The station is served by the following services:

- RailJet services (Lienz -) Villach - Klagenfurt - Vienna
- Railjet services Vienna - Klagenfurt - Villach - Udine - Venice
- EuroCity services Klagenfurt - Villach - Salzburg - Munich (-Dortmund/Frankfurt)
- EuroCity services Villach - Ljubljana - Zagreb
- EuroNight services (Belgrade-) Zagreb - Ljubljana - Villach - Innsbruck - Zurich
- EuroNight services Rome - Florence - Bologna (Milan - Verona) - Venice - Villach - Klagenfurt - Vienna
- EuroNight services Zagreb - Ljubljana - Villach - Salzburg - Munich

Preceding station	ÖBB	Following station
Spittal-Millstättersee towards München Hbf	Railjet	Velden am Wörther See towards Klagenfurt Hbf
Tarvisio Boscoverde towards Venezia Santa Lucia	Railjet	Velden am Wörther See towards Wien Hbf
Terminus	Railjet	Klagenfurt Hbf towards Wien Hbf
Spittal-Millstättersee towards Vienna Airport	Railjet	Velden am Wörther See towards Klagenfurt Hbf
Spittal-Millstättersee towards Frankfurt (Main) Hbf	EuroCity	Velden am Wörther See towards Klagenfurt Hbf
Spittal-Millstättersee towards Frankfurt (Main) Hbf	EuroCity	Faak am See towards Zagreb Glavni kolodvor
Spittal-Millstättersee towards Lienz	InterCity	Pörtschach am Wörther See towards Wien Hbf
Terminus	InterCity	Velden am Wörther See towards Wien Hbf
Spittal-Millstättersee towards Salzburg Hbf	InterCity	Velden am Wörther See towards Klagenfurt Hbf
Tarvisio Boscoverde towards Roma Termini or La Spezia Centrale	Nightjet	Klagenfurt Hbf towards Wien Hbf
Tarvisio Boscoverde towards Roma Termini or La Spezia Centrale	Nightjet	Schwarzach-St. Veit towards München Hbf
Preceding station	Croatian Railways	Following station
Spittal-Millstättersee towards Zürich HB or Stuttgart Hbf	EuroNight	Jesenice towards Zagreb
Preceding station	Optima Tours	Following station
Terminus	Optima Express (de)	Dobova towards Edirne
Preceding station	Carinthia S-Bahn	Following station
Puch bei Villach towards Lienz	S1	Villach Seebach towards Friesach
Terminus	S2	Villach Landskron towards St. Veit an der Glan
Villach Westbf towards Weizelsdorf	S3	Terminus
Villach Westbf towards Rosenbach	S4	Terminus

== See also ==
- Rail transport in Austria
