= Karawanks Tunnel (railway) =

Railway tunnel in Austria and Slovenia

Coordinates: 46.521°N 14.026°E

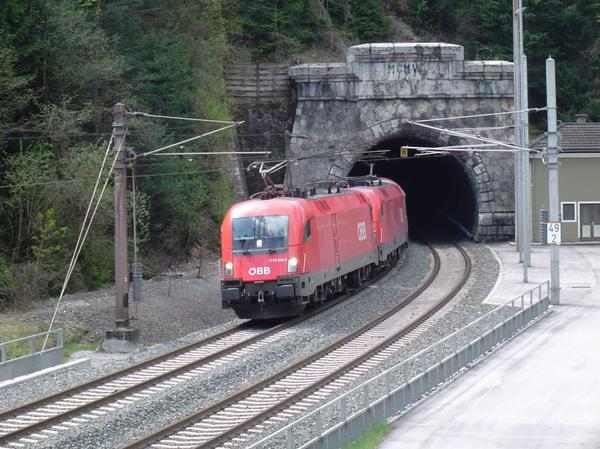
The northern entrance to the tunnel

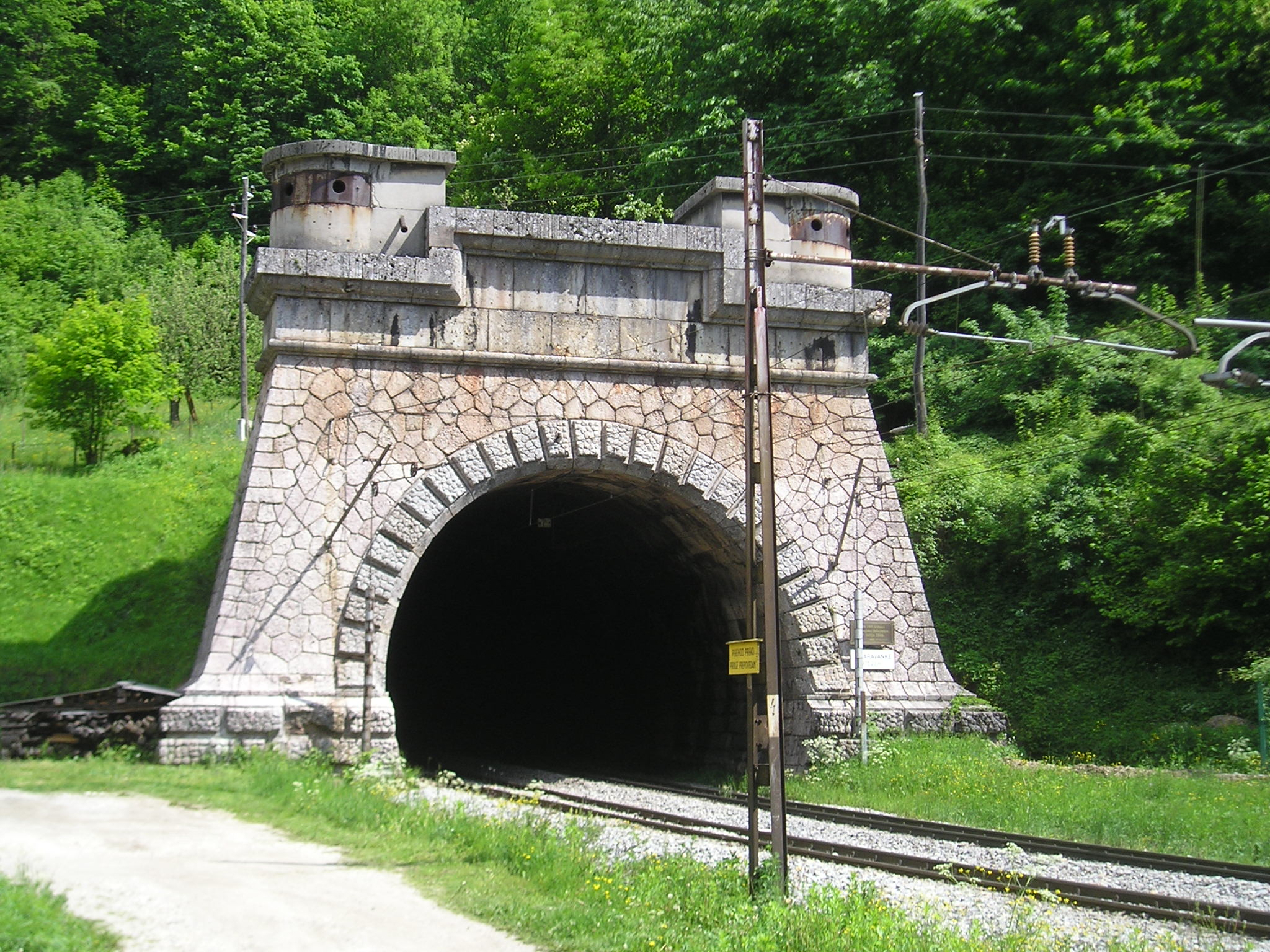
The southern entrance to the tunnel

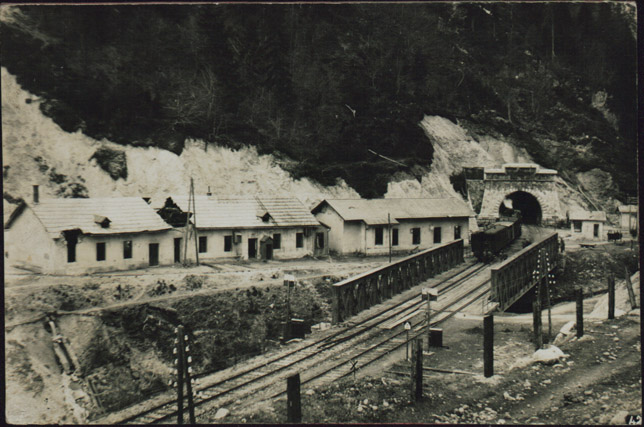
The northern entrance to the tunnel during the Austro-Slovene conflict in Carinthia, 1918 or 1919.

The Karawanks Tunnel (German: Karawankentunnel, Slovene: Predor Karavanke) is the fourth longest railway tunnel in Austria and the longest in Slovenia with a length of 8,176 metres (26,824 ft). It passes under Rožca Saddle between Rosenbach in southern Austria and Jesenice in northern Slovenia.

Upon opening in October 1906, the Karawanks Tunnel formed an important element of the Karawanken Railway, which was - together with the Bohinj Railway - constructed to connect the port of Trieste with Klagenfurt, the capital of the federal state of Carinthia in Austria. Despite the dissolution of the Austro-Hungarian Empire, which had been a driving force for its construction, the line and tunnel alike continued to be a well-trafficked route largely used by freight trains travelling between Austria and Slovenia. During the twenty-first century, the Karawanks Tunnel underwent extensive modernisation, being rationalised from a twin-track layout to a single track to comply with modern safety standards.

== History ==
Between 1867 and 1918, Trieste was a part of the Austro-Hungarian Empire. It was of considerable strategic importance, being that it was Austria's first seaport and thus naturally became the principal outlet for overseas trading by the Austro-Hungarian Empire; however, its effectiveness was undermined by the lack of an adequate railway communication with the Austrian interior. Seeking to greatly bolster international trade activity at Trieste in particular and the over-sea trade of Austria in general, it was decided in 1901 to construct a railway to connect Trieste and Klagenfurt. This line, the Karawanken Railway, was built over and through the Karawanks, Europe's longest (120 km/70 mi) mountain range; the route presently crosses the border between Austria and Slovenia.

A key feature of the railway was the Karawanks Tunnel. Its construction was particularly challenging due to the local geology being particularly unstable. Boring was accomplished by teams working at either end of the alignment, as many as 6,000 men worked in the tunnel's vicinity at the peak of activity. Electricity generated by waterfalls near to the future tunnel portals were used to power various items of equipment, from lighting to ventilation fans. Progress was made at an average rate of 13 feet per day, although complications would occasionally cause less progress to be made. In comparison to contemporary tunnels, the total cost of its construction was notably higher.

Such was the importance of the Karawanks Tunnel that, on 1 October 1906, the opening ceremony was officiated by the Austro-Hungarian head of state, Archduke Franz Ferdinand. The tunnel quickly became a heavily trafficked freight route, even after the dissolution of the Austro-Hungarian Empire during the following decade. Through to the present day, it has remained of importance to international freight traffic, being reportedly traversed by in excess of 80 trains per day.

== Twenty-first century renovations ==
In 2015, Austria and Slovenia, along with their respective railway infrastructure operating companies, signed an agreement for the renovation and improvement of the Karawanks Tunnel. The project has a total budget of 115 million euros, divided over the kilometers of each country, Slovenia contributing 50 million euros while Austria is to spend 65.3 million euros; the project is also financially supported by the European Union within the framework of the Connecting Europe Facility Program.

The construction work is scheduled to begin on August 10, 2020, and will be carried out by the Strabag in both countries. From October 5, 2020, to April 4, 2021, the tunnel is to be closed completely and completed by the end of the year.

Perhaps most noticeable amongst the changes to be made shall be the reduction of the original twin-track arrangement to a single track configuration; the resulting space freed up is to be reused as an emergency rescue passage, improving safety throughout the tunnel. In parallel with this work, various other improvements and modernisations shall be made to the 100-year-old structure, intended to bring it up to modern standards. These changes include the installation of a ceiling busbar, drainage renewal, a new floor, as well as the partial renovation of the tunnel vault via the addition of new anchors, reinforcement measures and concrete. The portals from the imperial era are also to be renovated and shine in new splendor. The implementation of new safety standards shall enable a higher operating speed inside the tunnel and make the tunnel RoLa - suitable. Despite the fact that the tunnel will only be operated with only the one track in the future, this is unlikely to particularly inhibit traffic as the rest of the line is a single-track as well; to reinstate the second track in compliance with modern safety regulation shall necessitate the boring of a second tunnel, which would involve considerable investment.

In the long term, it is being considered to build a second tube, just like the road tunnel, so that there should be one tunnel with one track per direction of travel. Therefore, as of summer 2020, a study is currently in preparation, which should already determine the best position for a possible second tube. Geology in particular should play a major role here, since it is very unfavorable in the Slovenian area of the current tunnel and has caused many problems in the construction of the first tube. In a historical building documentation, for example, it was described how a drilling rig was regularly crushed by the yielding rock mass and had to be freed again and again. Mine gases and mountain water also caused massive problems. The same was true for the construction of the first road tunnel, which lies in the same geology and runs practically parallel to the railway tunnel. The current solution with only one tunnel and one track should last until 2040, after which the construction of a second tube could be pending.
