= List of municipalities of the Province of Gorizia =

This is a list of the 25 municipalities (comuni) of the former Province of Gorizia in the autonomous region of Friuli-Venezia Giulia in Italy.

== List ==
Municipality	Population (2026)	Area (km^{2})	Density
Capriva del Friuli	1,566	6.32	247.8
Cormons	7,001	35.09	199.5
Doberdò del Lago	1,293	27.05	47.8
Dolegna del Collio	285	12.88	22.1
Farra d'Isonzo	1,681	10.25	164.0
Fogliano Redipuglia	2,966	7.92	374.5
Gorizia	33,679	41.26	816.3
Gradisca d'Isonzo	6,394	11.22	569.9
Grado	7,454	111.33	67.0
Mariano del Friuli	1,478	8.59	172.1
Medea	956	7.36	129.9
Monfalcone	30,767	19.73	1,559.4
Moraro	722	3.57	202.2
Mossa	1,512	6.21	243.5
Romans d'Isonzo	3,556	15.50	229.4
Ronchi dei Legionari	11,859	17.11	693.1
Sagrado	2,132	13.94	152.9
San Canzian d'Isonzo	6,048	33.89	178.5
San Floriano del Collio	718	10.63	67.5
San Lorenzo Isontino	1,479	4.40	336.1
San Pier d'Isonzo	1,914	9.03	212.0
Savogna d'Isonzo	1,678	16.98	98.8
Staranzano	7,130	19.66	362.7
Turriaco	2,784	5.18	537.5
Villesse	1,665	12.05	138.2

== See also ==
- List of municipalities of Friuli-Venezia Giulia
- List of municipalities of Italy
