= Grotta Regina del Carso =

Grotta Regina del Carso (Queen of Karst cave)
- Jama Kraljica Krasa
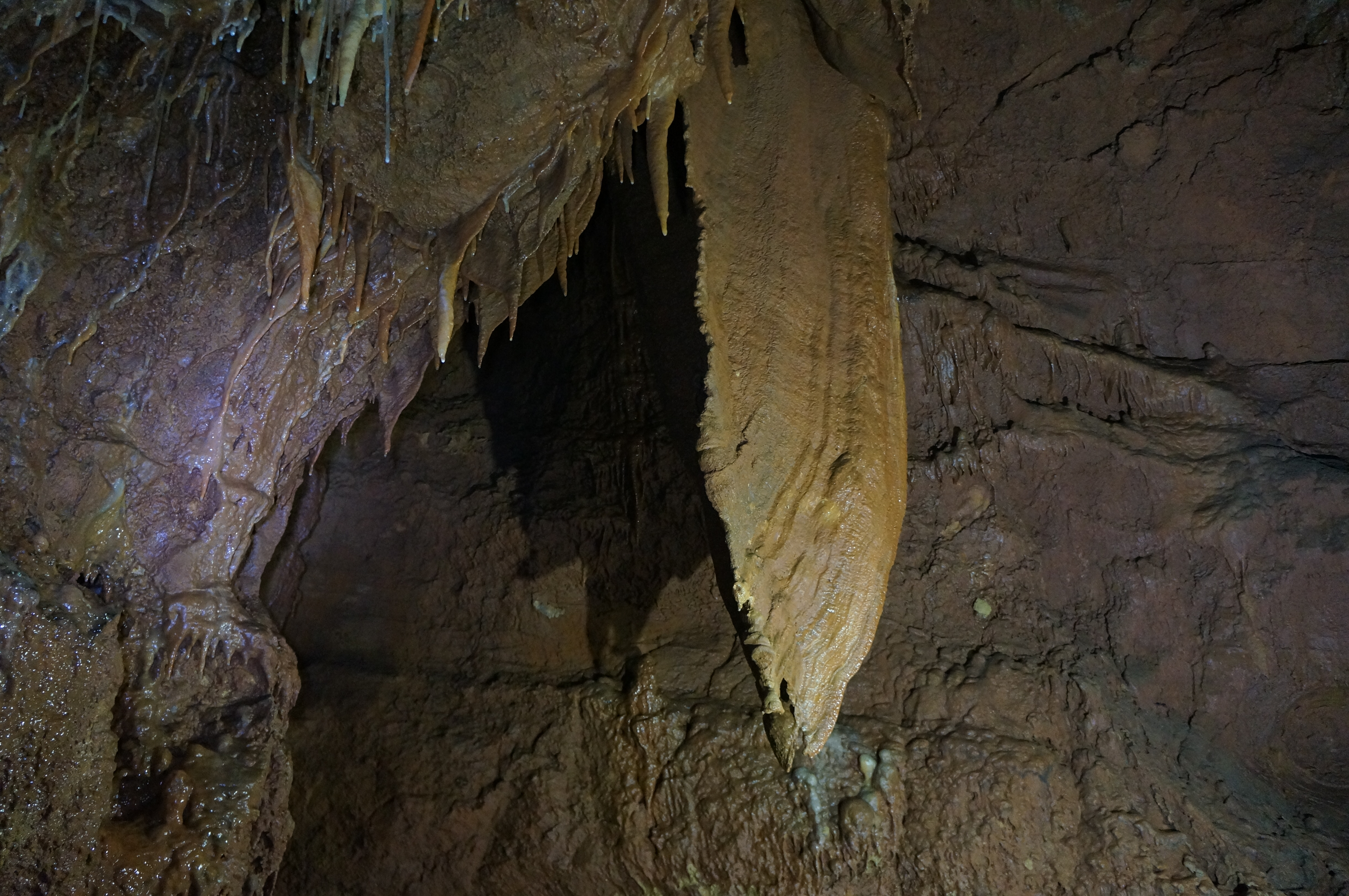
- 3 m (9.8 ft) high stalactite in the Hall of San Michele

- Location within Italy
- Location: Savogna d'Isonzo (GO, Friuli-Venezia Giulia, Italy)
- Coordinates: 45°52′54.14″N 13°34′02.82″E
- Depth: 57.4 m (188 ft)
- Length: 320 m (1,050 ft)
- Elevation: 194 m (636 ft)
- Discovery: 1972
- Geology: Karst cave
- Entrances: 1
- Difficulty: Speleological
- Lighting: No
- Features: Subhorizontal

Grotta Regina del Carso ("Queen of Karst cave", Slovene: Jama Kraljica Krasa) is a Karst cave in the village of San Michele del Carso (Slovene: Vrh) in the municipality of Savogna d'Isonzo (Gorizia, Friuli-Venezia Giulia, Italy). The cave is not open to public, and the access is managed by Talpe del Carso/Kraški Krti speleological group, headquartered in the vicinity of the entrance.

== Morphology ==
Grotta Regina opens 194 m (636 ft) above sea level. Overall, it is 320 m (1,050 ft) long and 57.4 m (188 ft) deep. The cave contains two main rooms, called respectively the Hall of the Council (Italian: Sala delle Riunioni), due to the presence of a number of stalagmites that seem to be the members of a municipality council, and the Hall of San Michele (Italian: Sala del San Michele), named after the main upland in the area. Two galleries connect the entrance with the Hall of the Council and this room with the Hall of San Michele. Rooms and galleries are full of cave formations (stalactites, stalagmites, columns, etc.), including a 3 m (9.8 ft) high stalactite in the Hall of San Michele. Next to the second room, a 30 m (98 ft) deep pit leads to a small lake in its bottom part. There are other small lakes, dropping bowls and gours into the cave. The innermost part of Grotta Regina consists of a meandering and muddy gallery, ending with a 5 m (16 ft) deep pit, after that the farthest point from the entrance is reached. A secondary branch leads to the Queen's Idol (Italian: Idolo della Regina), a 2 m (6 ft 7 in) high stalagmite that's the most important limestone formation and the symbol of the cavity.

== The exploration ==
The cave was discovered on 2 January 1972 by Dominik Grillo. Immediately, with some difficulties, cavers began to unblock the entrance and explore the cavity, discovering the most extended and beautiful cave in the Gorizia Karst. In the same year, cavers realised the survey of the cave, named Grotta Regina del Carso (Slovene: Jama Kraljica Krasa). The discover of the cave persuaded cavers to found a new group, called Gruppo Speleologico Talpe del Carso ("Karst Moles speleological group", Slovene: Jamarski Klub Kraški Krti), in the following year. The group has its headquarter, called baita ("lodge"), few meters far from the entrance of Grotta Regina.

In the following years, cavers widened the sides of the cave and discovered new branches, leading the total extension to 320 m (1,050 ft). In 1973, some glass slabs were set in particular spots in the cave, in order to verify the solidity of subterranean space. The slabs resisted to 1976 Friuli earthquake, showing Karst region was avoided the quake. Later, geologists and biologists achieved studies and researches on cave geomorphology and animal species living in the cavity.

== Fauna ==
Grotta Regina hosts some of the most common Karst cave dwelling species. Troglophiles include the spiders Meta menardi and Nesticus eremita, the cave cricket Troglophilus neglectus, the cricket Gryllomorpha dalmatina, the moths Scoliopteryx libatrix and Triphosa dubitata, and the fly Limonia nubeculosa. Troglobites include the woodlouse Androniscus stygius, the spiders Stalita taenaria and Mesostalita nocturna, the ground beetles Orotrechus muellerianus and Laemostenus cavicola, and the round fungus beetle Bathysciotes khevenhulleri tergestinus. Moreover, small lakes, dropping bowls and gours host many stygobites species belonging to roundworms, worms, copepods, Bathynellacea and amphipods.

The cave is the type locality (the place where the specimens were originally collected) of the diplurian Metajapyx peanoi (Pagés, 1980), a troglobite species known only living in this cavity and Grotta delle Radici in the Trieste Karst.

Vertebrates include some bats belonging to genus Rhinolophus, that use the cave mainly in summer. Moreover, between the 70ths and the 80ths, some specimens of the cave salamander Speleomantes strinatii from Grotte di Bossea (in Piedmont) were released in the cavity. A specimen was photographed in 2004, and, since then, any other one has been observed.

== Gallery ==
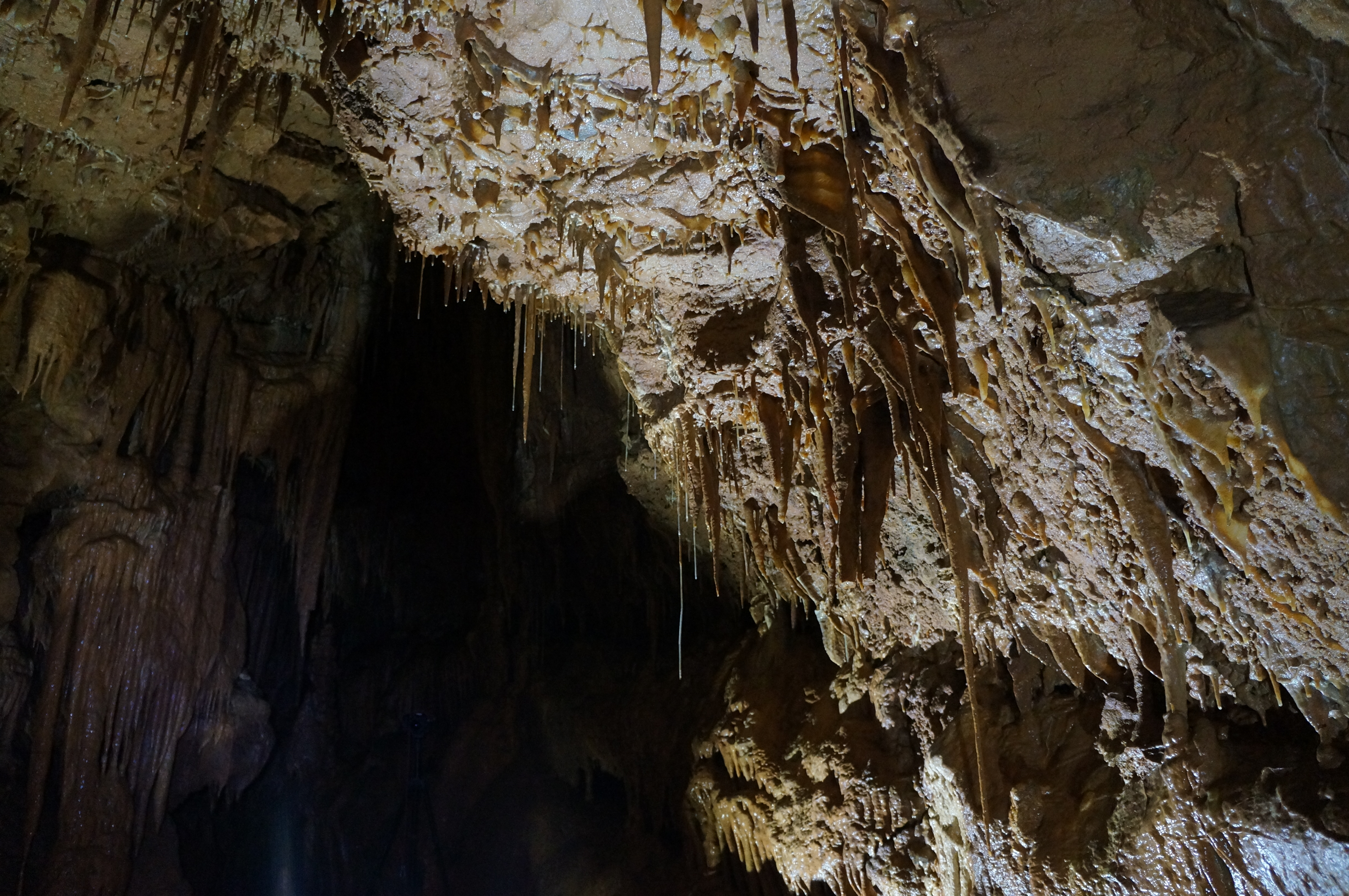
Hall of the Council

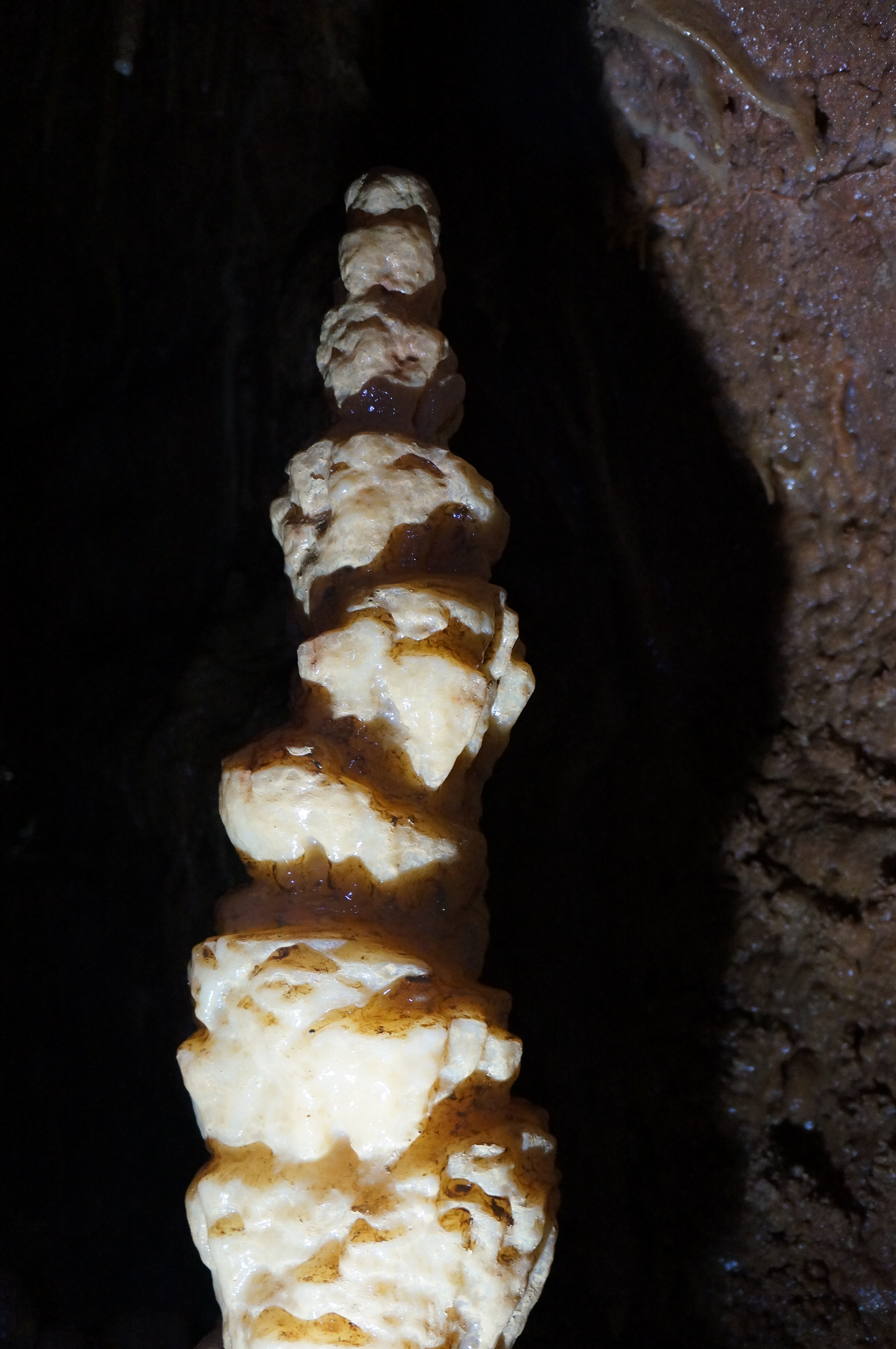
The Queen's Idole

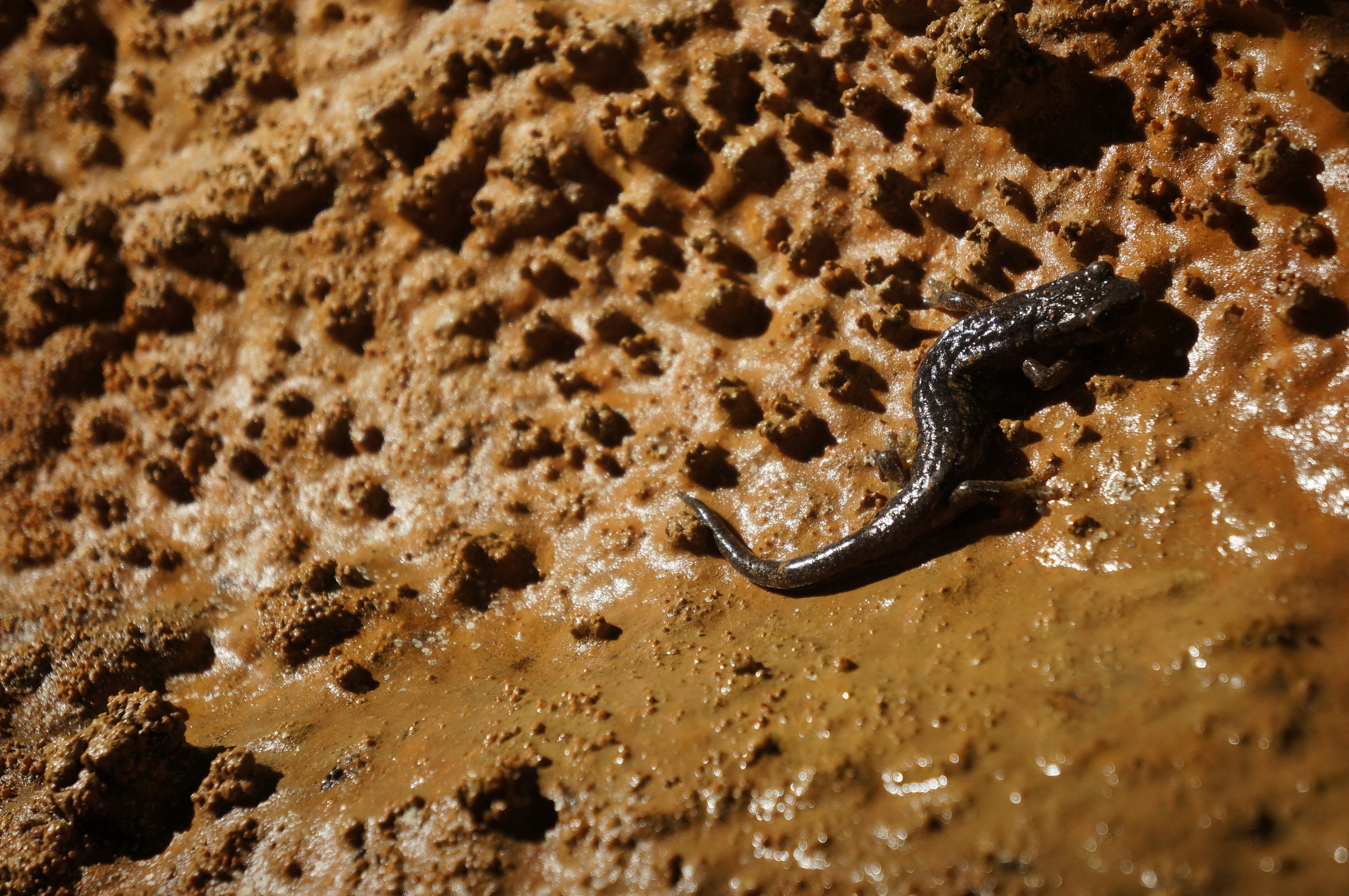
Salamander at the entrance of the cave

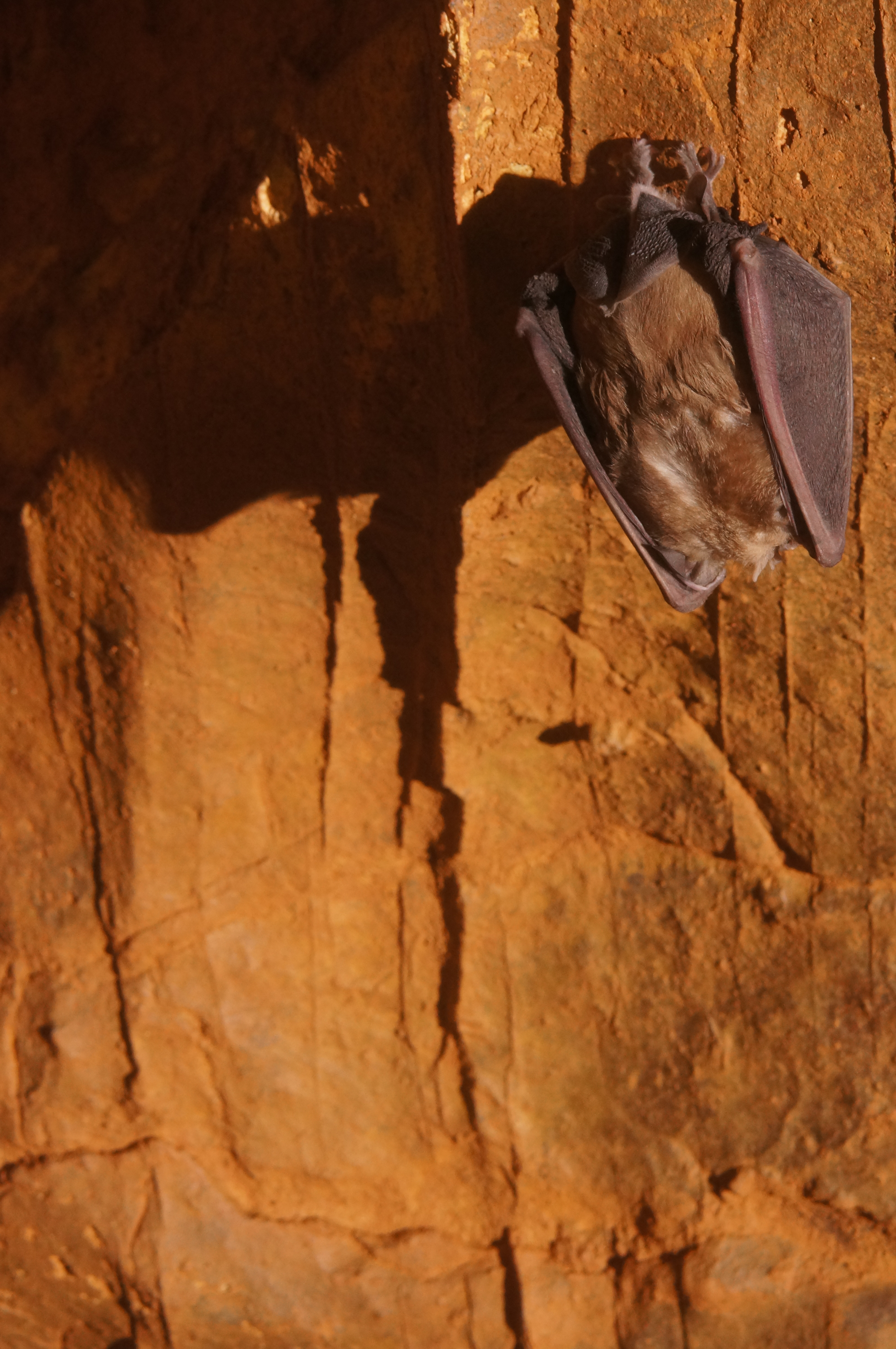
Rhinolophus sp. in hibernation

== See also ==
- List of deepest Dinaric caves
- List of longest Dinaric caves
