= Moraro =

- Comune
- Comune di Moraro
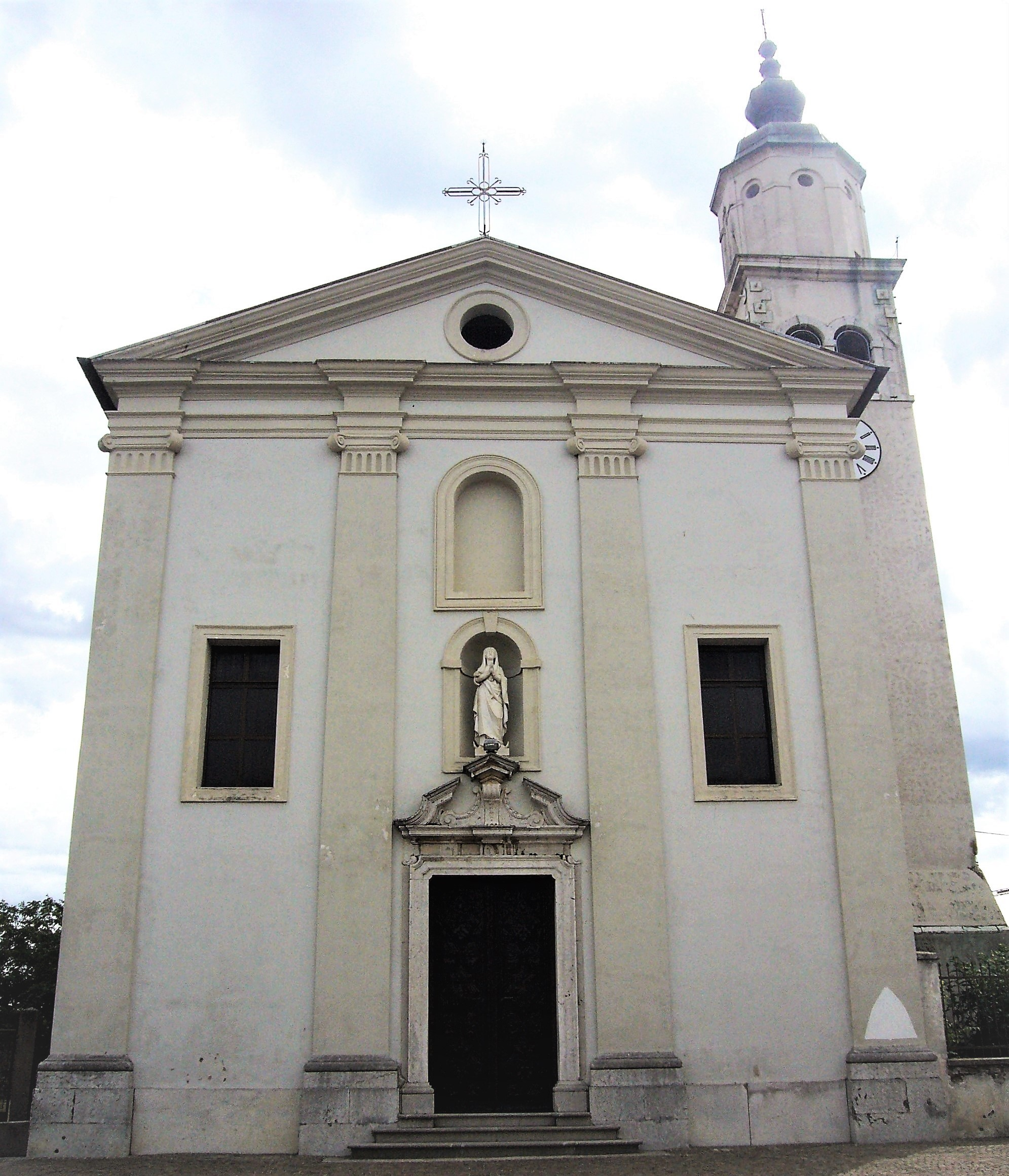

- Location within Italy Location within Friuli-Venezia Giulia
- Coordinates: 45°56′N 13°30′E
- Country: Italy
- Region: Friuli-Venezia Giulia
- Province: Gorizia (GO)

Government
  - Mayor: Lorenzo Donda

Area
  - Total: 3.5 km^{2} (1.4 sq mi)
- Elevation: 44 m (144 ft)

Population (Dec. 2004)
  - Total: 712
  - Density: 200/km^{2} (530/sq mi)
- Demonym: Moraresi
- Time zone: UTC+1 (CET)
  - Summer (DST): UTC+2 (CEST)
- Postal code: 34070
- Dialing code: 0481
- Website: Official website

Moraro (Slovene: Morar; Friulian: Morâr) is a comune (municipality) in the Regional decentralization entity of Gorizia in the Italian region of Friuli-Venezia Giulia, located about 40 kilometres (25 mi) northwest of Trieste and about 9 kilometres (6 mi) west of Gorizia.

Moraro borders the following municipalities: Capriva del Friuli, Cormons, Farra d'Isonzo, Gradisca d'Isonzo, Mariano del Friuli, San Lorenzo Isontino.
