= San Giovanni al Natisone =

San Giovanni al Natisone San Zuan dal Nadison (Friulian)
- Comune
- Comune di San Giovanni al Natisone
- Coat of arms

- Location within Italy Location within Friuli-Venezia Giulia
- Coordinates: 45°59′N 13°24′E
- Country: Italy
- Region: Friuli-Venezia Giulia
- Province: Udine (UD)
- Frazioni: Bolzano, Dolegnano, Medeuzza, Villanova del Judrio

Government
  - Mayor: Carlo Pali

Area
  - Total: 23.9 km^{2} (9.2 sq mi)
- Elevation: 66 m (217 ft)

Population (30 April 2017)
  - Total: 6,127
  - Density: 256/km^{2} (664/sq mi)
- Demonym: San Giovannesi
- Time zone: UTC+1 (CET)
  - Summer (DST): UTC+2 (CEST)
- Postal code: 33048
- Dialing code: 0432
- Patron saint: St. John the Baptist
- Saint day: June 24
- Website: Official website

San Giovanni al Natisone (Friulian: San Zuan dal Nadison) is a comune (municipality) in the Regional decentralization entity of Udine in the Italian region of Friuli-Venezia Giulia, located about 50 kilometres (31 mi) northwest of Trieste and about 15 kilometres (9 mi) southeast of Udine.

San Giovanni al Natisone borders the following municipalities: Chiopris-Viscone, Cormons, Corno di Rosazzo, Manzano, Trivignano Udinese.

== Twin towns ==
- Francavilla Fontana, Italy
- Kuchl, Austria
