= Koprivno =

Koprivno may refer to:

- Koprivno, the Slovene name of Capriva del Friuli, a commune in Italy
- Koprivno, Croatia, a village near Dugopolje
- Koprivno, Bosnia and Herzegovina, a village near Milići, Republika Srpska, Bosnia and Herzegovina
