= Church of the Immaculate Conception (Farra d'Isonzo) =

Church in Farra d'Isonzo, Italy

Chiesa dell'Immacolata Concezione English: Church of the Immaculate Conception

Religion
- Affiliation: Roman Catholic
- Year consecrated: 1669

Location
- Location: (Italy) Farra d'Isonzo
- Interactive map of Chiesa dell'Immacolata Concezione; English: Church of the Immaculate Conception
- Coordinates: 45°54′16.89″N 13°30′53.69″E

Architecture
- Type: Church
- Groundbreaking: 1665
- Completed: 1669

Website
- http://www.comune.farra.go.it/

The Church of the Immaculate Conception is an Italian church located in Borgo Zuppini, a district of Farra d'Isonzo. The church dates back to the 17th century. It belonged to the Gradiscan family of the Zuppini counts. In November 1665, Emperor Leopold confirmed the noble title to brothers Giovanni Battista, Antonio and Filippo. The church was erected on land owned by the Zuppini family by Count Giovanni Battista to fulfill a vow, following his recovery from an illness. The church was once private property of the Zuppini family, but it belongs to the Parish of Farra d'Isonzo since 1924. A descendant of the founder, died in 1778, was buried in the chapel. It was dedicated to the Immaculate Conception, to which the count had turned to beg for grace. It is the oldest church in the diocese named after the Immaculate Conception.

== History ==
The Church of the Immaculate Conception of Borgo Zuppini in Farra is the oldest in the archdiocese with this name. It was erected as a fulfillment of a vow by Count Giovanni Battista Zuppini, following his recovery from a severe illness. It was built between 1665 (the year in which the noble title of the Zuppini was confirmed) and 1669, the year in which the church was consecrated. The building was restored in the second half of the 19th century. Further maintenance interventions were carried out over time. However, there are no sources that confirm them with certainty and provide their extent and details. After World War I it was probably repaired from the damage suffered during the conflict, and later consecrated again. Currently the building is in a state of structural precariousness. It is closed to the public and needs urgent intervention.
