= Manzano, Friuli Venezia Giulia =

Manzano Manzan (Friulian)
- Comune
- Comune di Manzano
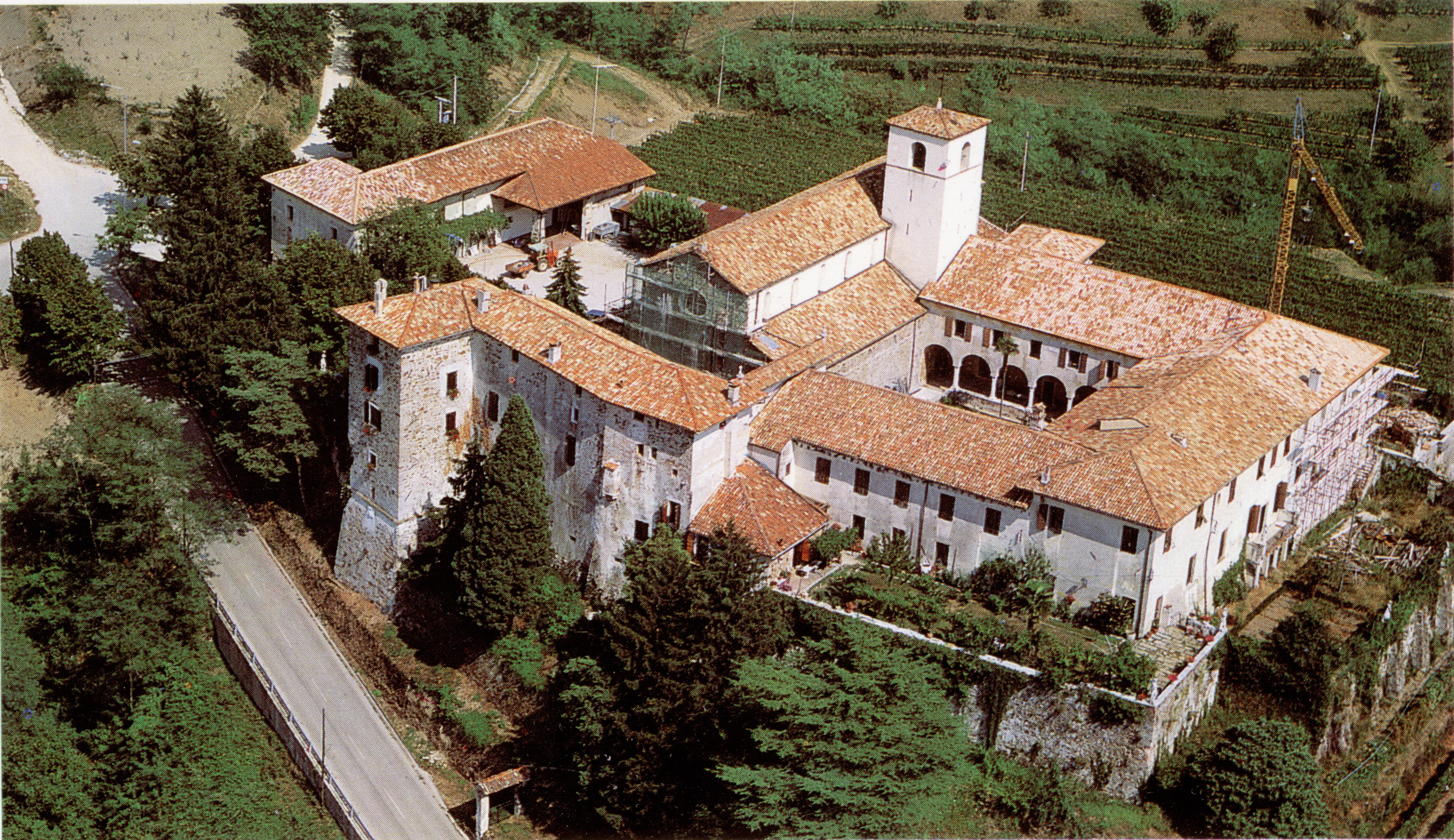
- Rosazzo Abbey

- Location within Italy Location within Friuli-Venezia Giulia
- Coordinates: 45°59′N 13°23′E
- Country: Italy
- Region: Friuli-Venezia Giulia
- Province: Udine (UD)
- Frazioni: Manzinello, Oleis, Rosazzo, San Lorenzo, San Nicolò, Soleschiano

Government
  - Mayor: Piero Furlani

Area
  - Total: 30.9 km^{2} (11.9 sq mi)
- Elevation: 71 m (233 ft)

Population (Dec. 2004)
  - Total: 6,845
  - Density: 222/km^{2} (574/sq mi)
- Demonym: Manzanesi
- Time zone: UTC+1 (CET)
  - Summer (DST): UTC+2 (CEST)
- Postal code: 33044
- Dialing code: 0432
- Website: Official website

Manzano (Friulian: Manzan) is a comune (municipality) in the Regional decentralization entity of Udine in the Italian region of Friuli-Venezia Giulia. It is chiefly known for Rosazzo Abbey, a well preserved medieval monastery complex.

Situated in the eastern hills of the historic Friuli region on the Natisone river, Manzano is located about 50 kilometres (31 mi) northwest of Trieste and about 15 kilometres (9 mi) southeast of Udine.

Manzano borders the following municipalities: Buttrio, Corno di Rosazzo, Pavia di Udine, Premariacco, San Giovanni al Natisone, and Trivignano Udinese.

== History ==
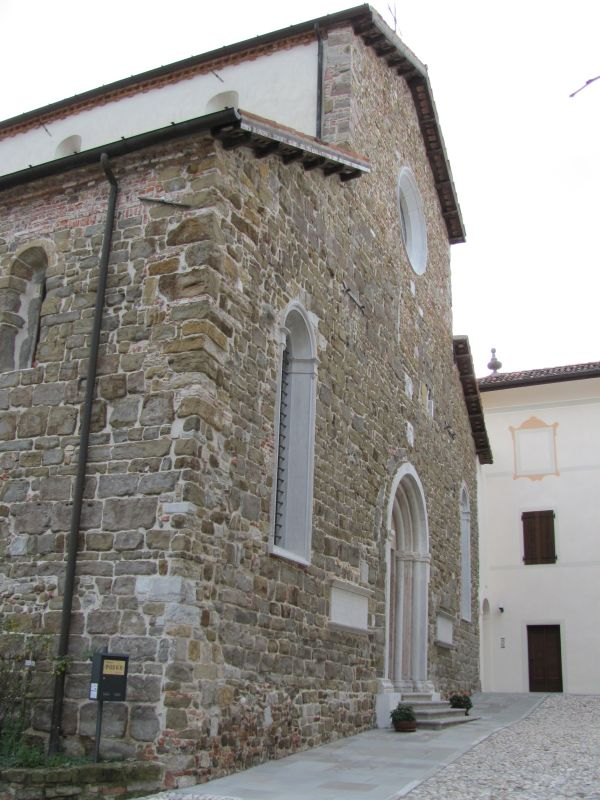
St Peter's Church

According to legend, a first chapel at Rosazzo was built about 800 by a hermit called Alemanno. A convent of Augustinian canons (monasterium rosarum) was probably established around 960, when the area became part of the Imperial March of Verona. The monastery church dedicated to Saint Peter was consecrated in 1070; it was elevated to the rank of an abbey by the Aquileia patriarch Ulrich of Eppenstein about 1090. At the time, the premises were settled with Benedictine monks descending from Millstatt Abbey in Carinthia, where Ulrich's brother Liutold was duke.

Under Benedictine rule the abbey prospered and held large estates in the Gorizia Hills, as well as in Istria and around Tarvisio. In 1245 the monastery was even put under immediate papal authority by Pope Innocent IV. However, the autonomy of Rosazzo ended in 1391, when the convent was transferred in commendam of the Archdiocese of Ravenna. By 1420, the Friuli region was occupied by the Republic of Venice and later incorporated into the Domini di Terraferma. Devastated by a blaze in 1509, the premises were abandoned and re-settled by Dominican brothers from 1522 onwards. From 1823 Rosazzo served as a summer residence of the Bishops of Udine.

Part of the Kingdom of Italy from 1866, Manzano was the site where during World War I, from 29 July 1917, the first Arditi units of the Royal Italian Army were formed and trained. The event is still celebrated on the last Sunday in July. Rosazzo Abbey was heavily damaged by the 1976 Friuli earthquake, but restored under the auspices of the Udine archbishop Alfredo Battisti.

== Twin towns ==
Manzano is twinned with:

- Labin, Croatia
- Wolfratshausen, Germany (since 1983)
