= San Vito al Torre =

San Vito al Torre Šentvid na Teru (Slovene) San Vît de Tor (Friulian)
- Comune
- Comune di San Vito al Torre
- Location within Italy Location within Friuli-Venezia Giulia
- Coordinates: 45°54′N 13°22′E
- Country: Italy
- Region: Friuli-Venezia Giulia
- Province: Udine (UD)
- Frazioni: Crauglio, Nogaredo

Government
  - Mayor: Doretto Cettolo

Area
  - Total: 11.6 km^{2} (4.5 sq mi)
- Elevation: 17 m (56 ft)

Population (31 December 2021)
  - Total: 1,202
  - Density: 104/km^{2} (268/sq mi)
- Demonym: Sanvitesi
- Time zone: UTC+1 (CET)
  - Summer (DST): UTC+2 (CEST)
- Postal code: 33050
- Dialing code: 0432
- Website: Official website

San Vito al Torre (Slovene: Šentvid na Teru; Friulian: San Vît de Tor) is a comune (municipality) in the Regional decentralization entity of Udine in the Italian region Friuli-Venezia Giulia, located about 45 kilometres (28 mi) northwest of Trieste and about 20 kilometres (12 mi) southeast of Udine.

San Vito al Torre borders the following municipalities: Aiello del Friuli, Campolongo Tapogliano, Chiopris-Viscone, Medea, Palmanova, Romans d'Isonzo, Trivignano Udinese, Visco.

== Notable people from San Vito al Torre ==
- Ruggero Salar, football player and coach
