= Chiopris-Viscone =

Chiopris-Viscone Cjopris e Viscon (Friulian)
- Comune
- Comune di Chiopris-Viscone
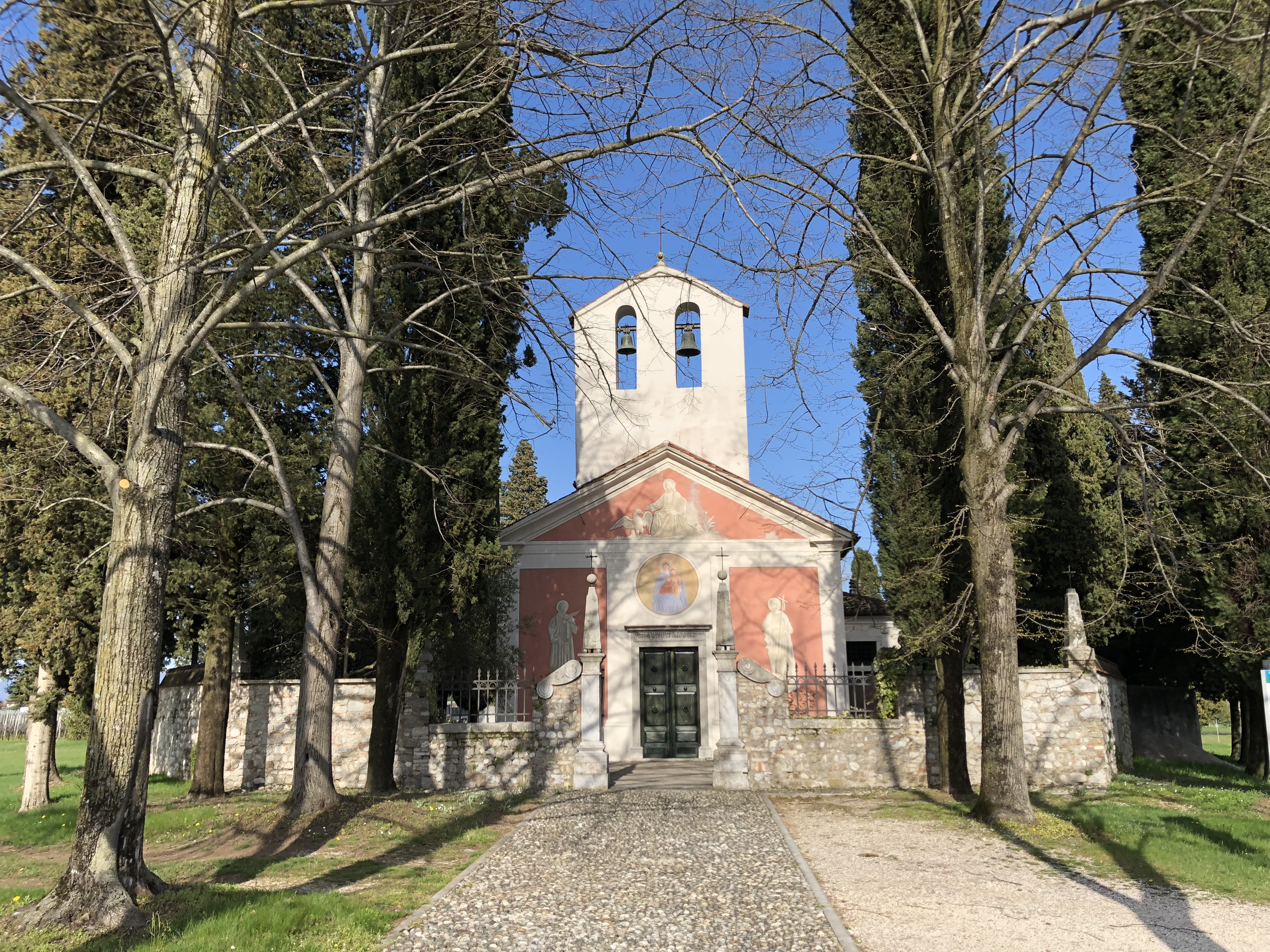
- Church of Madonna della Strada at Viscone.

- Location within Italy Location within Friuli-Venezia Giulia
- Coordinates: 45°56′N 13°23′E
- Country: Italy
- Region: Friuli-Venezia Giulia
- Province: Udine (UD)
- Frazioni: Chiopris, Viscone

Government
  - Mayor: Raffaella Perusin

Area
  - Total: 9.0 km^{2} (3.5 sq mi)
- Elevation: 33 m (108 ft)

Population (30 June 2017)
  - Total: 639
  - Density: 71/km^{2} (180/sq mi)
- Demonym(s): Chioprisani and Visconesi
- Time zone: UTC+1 (CET)
  - Summer (DST): UTC+2 (CEST)
- Postal code: 33040
- Dialing code: 0432
- Website: Official website

Chiopris-Viscone (Friulian: Cjopris e Viscon) is a comune (municipality) in the Regional decentralization entity of Udine in the Italian region of Friuli-Venezia Giulia, located about 45 kilometres (28 mi) northwest of Trieste and about 20 kilometres (12 mi) southeast of Udine. It is formed by the two frazioni (boroughs) of Chiopris, which is the municipal seat, and Viscone.

Chiopris-Viscone borders the following municipalities: Cormons, Medea, San Giovanni al Natisone, San Vito al Torre, Trivignano Udinese.

Until 1918, Chiopris-Viscone was part of the Austria-Hungary, until it was given to Italy. However, in 1923 it was detached from the province of Gorizia and assigned to the province of Udine.
