= Ruggero Salar =

Italian footballer and coach

Personal information
- Date of birth: 4 October 1918
- Place of birth: San Vito al Torre, Austria Hungary (now in Italy)
- Height: 1.80 m (5 ft 11 in)
- Position: Midfielder

Senior career*
Years	Team	Apps	(Gls)
1935–1938	Taranto	38	(1)
1938–1944	Triestina	122	(10)
1945–1947	Roma	61	(1)
1947–1948	Lucchese	29	(0)
1948–1949	Venezia	40	(0)
1949–1950	Prato	21	(0)

Managerial career
- 1962–1964: Treviso
- 1964–1966: Mestre
- 1966–1967: Lucchese
- 1967–1969: Matera
- 1969–1970: Turris
- 1970–1971: Lucchese
- 1973–1974: Viareggio
- 1974–1975: Matera
- * Club domestic league appearances and goals

Ruggero Salar (born 4 October 1918) was an Italian professional football player and coach.

Salar played for 7 seasons (166 games, 7 goals) in the Serie A for U.S. Triestina Calcio, A.S. Roma and A.S. Lucchese Libertas 1905.
