= Medea, Friuli Venezia Giulia =

Medea
- Comune
- Comune di Medea
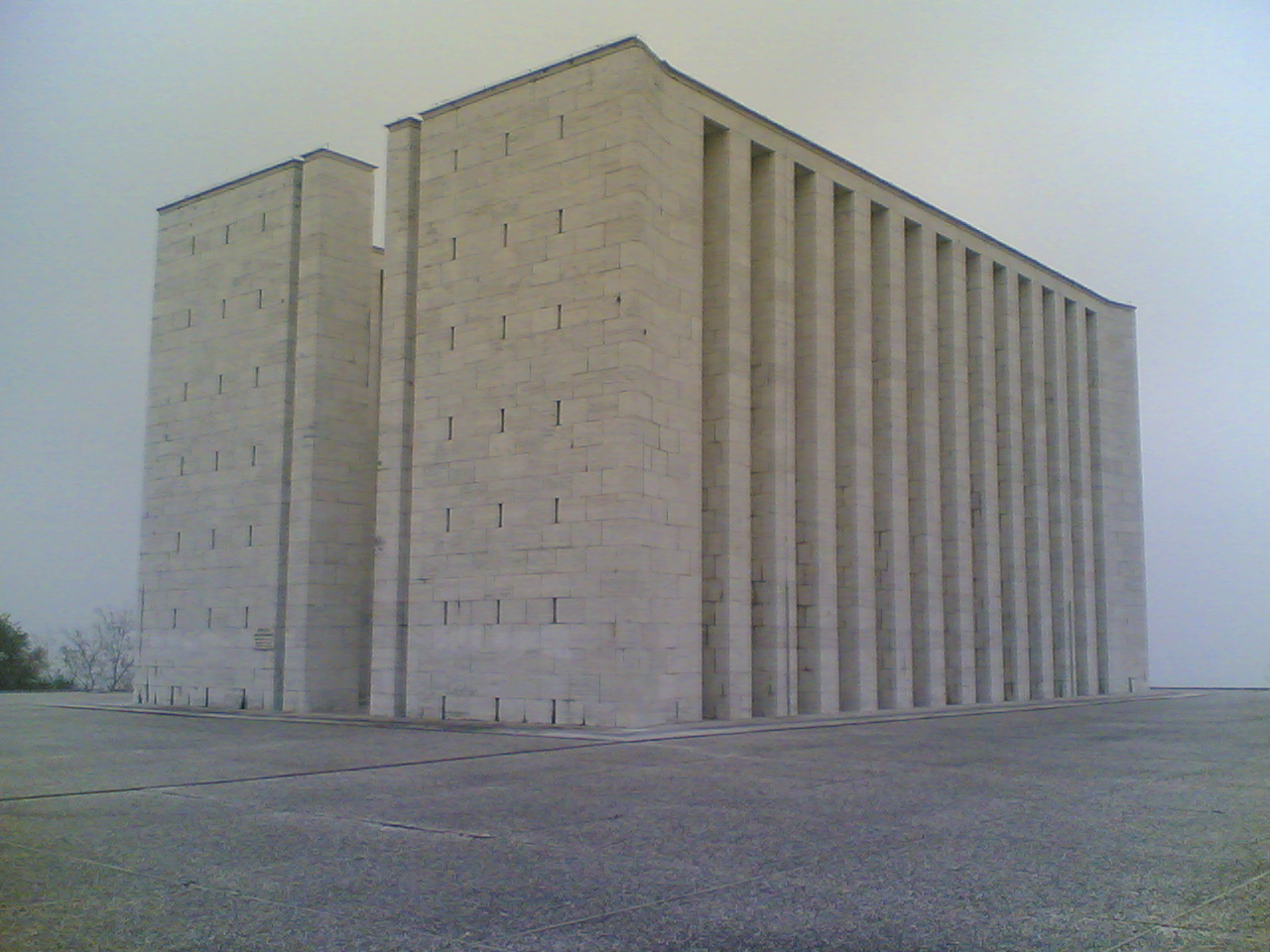

- Location within Italy Location within Friuli-Venezia Giulia
- Coordinates: 45°55′N 13°25′E
- Country: Italy
- Region: Friuli-Venezia Giulia
- Province: Gorizia (GO)
- Frazioni: Ara Pacis, Monte di Medea, Sant’Antonio

Government
  - Mayor: Alberto Bergamin

Area
  - Total: 7.3 km^{2} (2.8 sq mi)
- Elevation: 132 m (433 ft)

Population (Dec. 2004)
  - Total: 918
  - Density: 130/km^{2} (330/sq mi)
- Demonym: Medeensi o medeotti
- Time zone: UTC+1 (CET)
  - Summer (DST): UTC+2 (CEST)
- Postal code: 34070
- Dialing code: 0481

Medea (Slovene: Medeja; Friulian: Migjea or Migjee; German: Mödan) is a comune (municipality) in the Regional decentralization entity of Gorizia in the Italian region of Friuli-Venezia Giulia, located about 45 kilometres (28 mi) northwest of Trieste and about 15 kilometres (9 mi) west of Gorizia. As of 31 December 2004, it had a population of 918 and an area of 7.3 square kilometres (2.8 mi^{2}).

The municipality of Medea contains the frazioni (boroughs) Ara Pacis, Monte di Medea, and Sant’Antonio.

Medea borders the following municipalities: Chiopris-Viscone, Cormons, Mariano del Friuli, Romans d'Isonzo, San Vito al Torre.

== Demographic evolution ==
Historical population

Year	Pop.	±%
1861	?	—
1871	?	—
1881	?	—
1901	?	—
1911	?	—

Year	Pop.	±%
1921	1,253	—
1931	1,043	−16.8%
1936	977	−6.3%
1951	1,048	+7.3%
1961	1,013	−3.3%

Year	Pop.	±%
1971	887	−12.4%
1981	871	−1.8%
1991	839	−3.7%
2001	937	+11.7%

Source: Data from ISTAT
