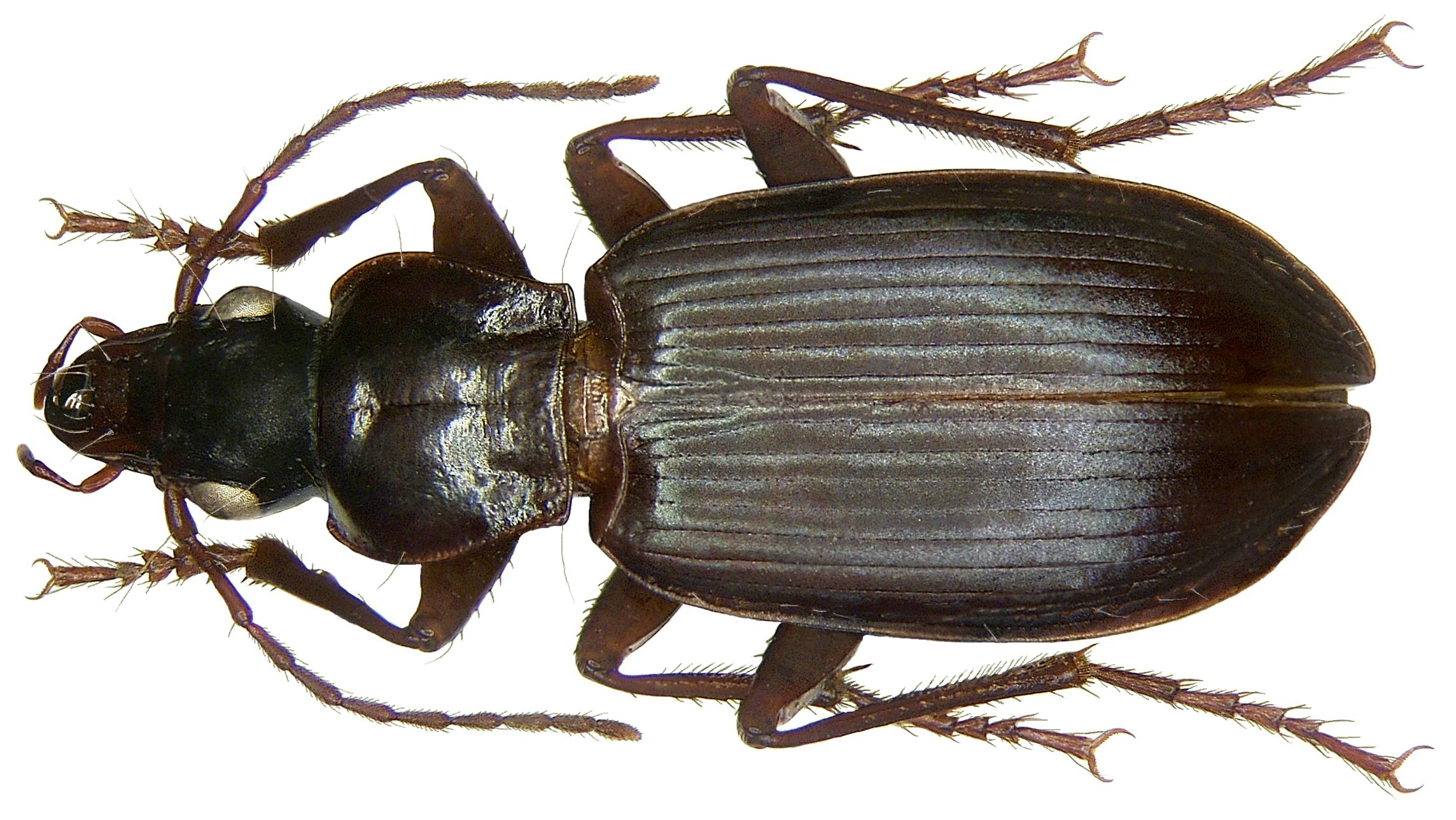

Scientific classification
- Kingdom: Animalia
- Phylum: Arthropoda
- Class: Insecta
- Order: Coleoptera
- Suborder: Adephaga
- Family: Carabidae
- Genus: Laemostenus
- Species: L. complanatus

Binomial name
- Laemostenus complanatus (Dejean, 1828)

= Laemostenus complanatus =

Species of beetle

Laemostenus complanatus is a species of ground beetle native to Europe.
