= Cormons =

- Comune
- Città di Cormons
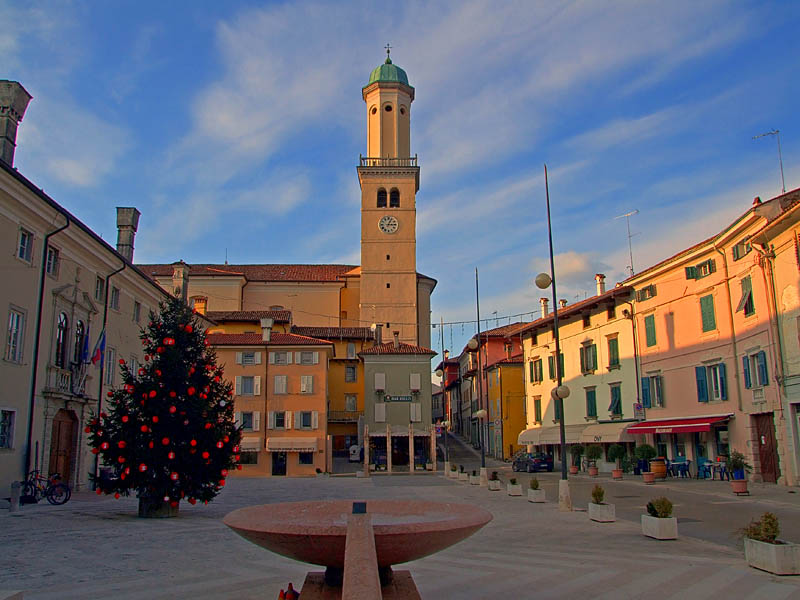
- Main square in Cormons, renovated by the architect Boris Podrecca

- Location within Italy Location within Friuli-Venezia Giulia
- Coordinates: 45°57′N 13°28′E
- Country: Italy
- Region: Friuli-Venezia Giulia
- Province: Gorizia (GO)
- Frazioni: Angoris, Borgnano, Brazzano, Giassico, San Rocco di Brazzano, Novali, Castelletto, Plessiva, Povia, Fornaci, Roncada, Monticello di Cormons

Government
  - Mayor: Roberto Felcaro (Lista civica)

Area
  - Total: 34.6 km^{2} (13.4 sq mi)
- Elevation: 56 m (184 ft)

Population (July 2025)
  - Total: 7,014
  - Density: 203/km^{2} (525/sq mi)
- Demonym: Cormonesi
- Time zone: UTC+1 (CET)
  - Summer (DST): UTC+2 (CEST)
- Postal code: 34071
- Dialing code: 0481
- Website: Official website

Cormons or Cormòns (Slovene: Krmin; German: Kremaun) is a comune (municipality) in the Regional decentralization entity of Gorizia in the Italian region of Friuli-Venezia Giulia, located about 45 kilometres (28 mi) northwest of Trieste and about 12 kilometres (7 mi) west of Gorizia, on the border with Slovenia.

Cormons borders the following municipalities: Brda (Slovenia), Capriva del Friuli, Chiopris-Viscone, Corno di Rosazzo, Dolegna del Collio, Mariano del Friuli, Medea, Moraro, San Floriano del Collio, San Giovanni al Natisone.

== Physical geography ==
Located at the foot of Mount Quarin (274 m above sea level) north of the Gorizia Karst, in the Collio plain, it is approximately 3 kilometers from the Slovenian border, approximately 40 kilometers from the regional capital Trieste, 10 kilometers from the provincial capital Gorizia, approximately 25 kilometers from Udine, and approximately 90 kilometers from Pordenone.

== Origins of the Name ==
The name Cormons has a pre-Latin linguistic substratum: it probably derives from a personal or popular name (Carmo), which also gave rise to the name of a tribe, the Galli Carmones or Carmonenses. The tribe owed its name to a weasel or an ermine (carmùn in Rhaeto-Romance and harmo in Old German, respectively), which it had made its totem.

== History ==
During the 11th and 12th centuries, Cormons was disputed between the patriarchs of Aquileia and the counts of Gorizia, who took possession of it in 1277. After a brief Venetian occupation in 1308, it returned to the counts of Gorizia. In 1497, Count Leonardo of Gorizia was forced by Maximilian I of Habsburg to sign a legacy in his favour to avoid war. Upon Leonardo's death, Cormons, like the entire county of Gorizia, passed to the Habsburg Empire which, except for a brief period of occupation by the Republic of Venice (1508-1509) and the brief Napoleonic interlude, maintained it until the First World War. From 1563 to 1570, political-military meetings between Venice and the Empire were held there, which however yielded little result.

Following the conclusion of the Napoleonic Wars and the redefined borders of European states at the Congress of Vienna, in 1816 Cormons and the Gorizia area became part of the Kingdom of Austria. In 1849, by order of Emperor Franz Joseph, the territory of Gorizia obtained the status of Land and took the name of Princely County of Gorizia and Gradisca, thus becoming one of the 17 countries represented in the Imperial Council.

At the conclusion of the third war of independence, on 12 August 1866, the general of the army corps Petitti di Roreto and the Austrian plenipotentiary, general Moring, signed the armistice between the Kingdom of Italy and the Austrian Empire in Cormons, at Villa Tomadoni.

With the papal bull of August 4, 1910, Franz Joseph I of Austria granted Cormons the title of city. He thus recognized its significant economic growth, due to the Südbahn railway that had connected Cormons to Vienna since 1860 and to the Italian railway network, and which from 1866 became the customs post on the border between the Austro-Hungarian Empire and Italy.

During the First World War, it immediately passed into Italian hands (May 25, 1915), was then reconquered by the Austrians (October 28, 1917, XII Battle of the Isonzo), and finally returned to Italy at the end of the First World War; however, it was partially damaged during the war.

During World War II, Cormons was invaded by the Germans after the armistice. During the Nazi-Fascist occupation, partisan groups emerged in Cormons, such as the Garibaldi and Mazzini Battalions, which for two years carried out sabotage and ambushes against the Nazi-Fascists throughout the Cormons area. Only on 3 May 1945 was Cormons liberated by the simultaneous intervention of Italian partisan formations, those of the IX Slovenian Korpus and units of the 2nd New Zealand Division.

The history of the recreation center on Via Pozzetto began immediately after the end of World War II, thanks to the vision and determination of the then parish priest, Monsignor Angelo Magrini. The area was occupied by the old Habsburg barracks, which after the war had lost much of its function, with the new one built in the late 1930s being sufficient. Cormons, like Gorizia and Trieste, was under the protection of the Allied military government until September 1947, with the entry into force of the peace treaty signed in Paris in February of that same year. It was between 1945 and 1947 that the fate of that vast area was decided, also under American pressure. With the council resolution of July 5, 1947, the area of the current recreation center was provisionally assigned to the parish by the Army Corps of Engineers.

== Symbols ==
=== Coat of Arms ===
The municipal coat of arms was granted by Emperor Franz Joseph on March 16, 1869, and was then officially recognized by the Italian State with the Decree of 7 August 1936.

=== Gonfalon ===
The gonfalon was adopted by resolution of the municipal council on November 16, 1953.

== Honours ==
On August 4, 1910 Emperor Franz Joseph granted Cormons the title of city (Stadt).

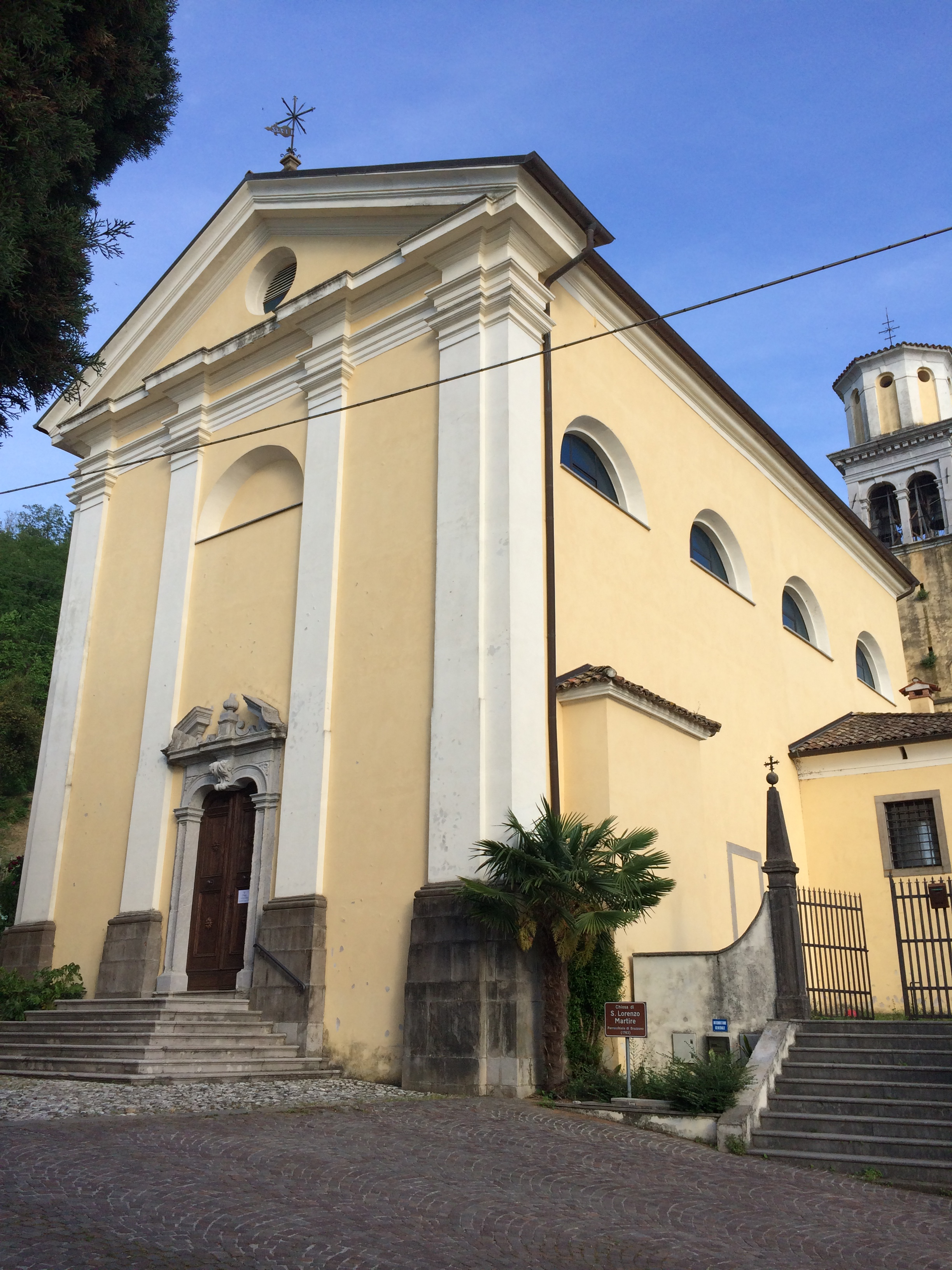
Church of San Lorenzo (Brazzano)

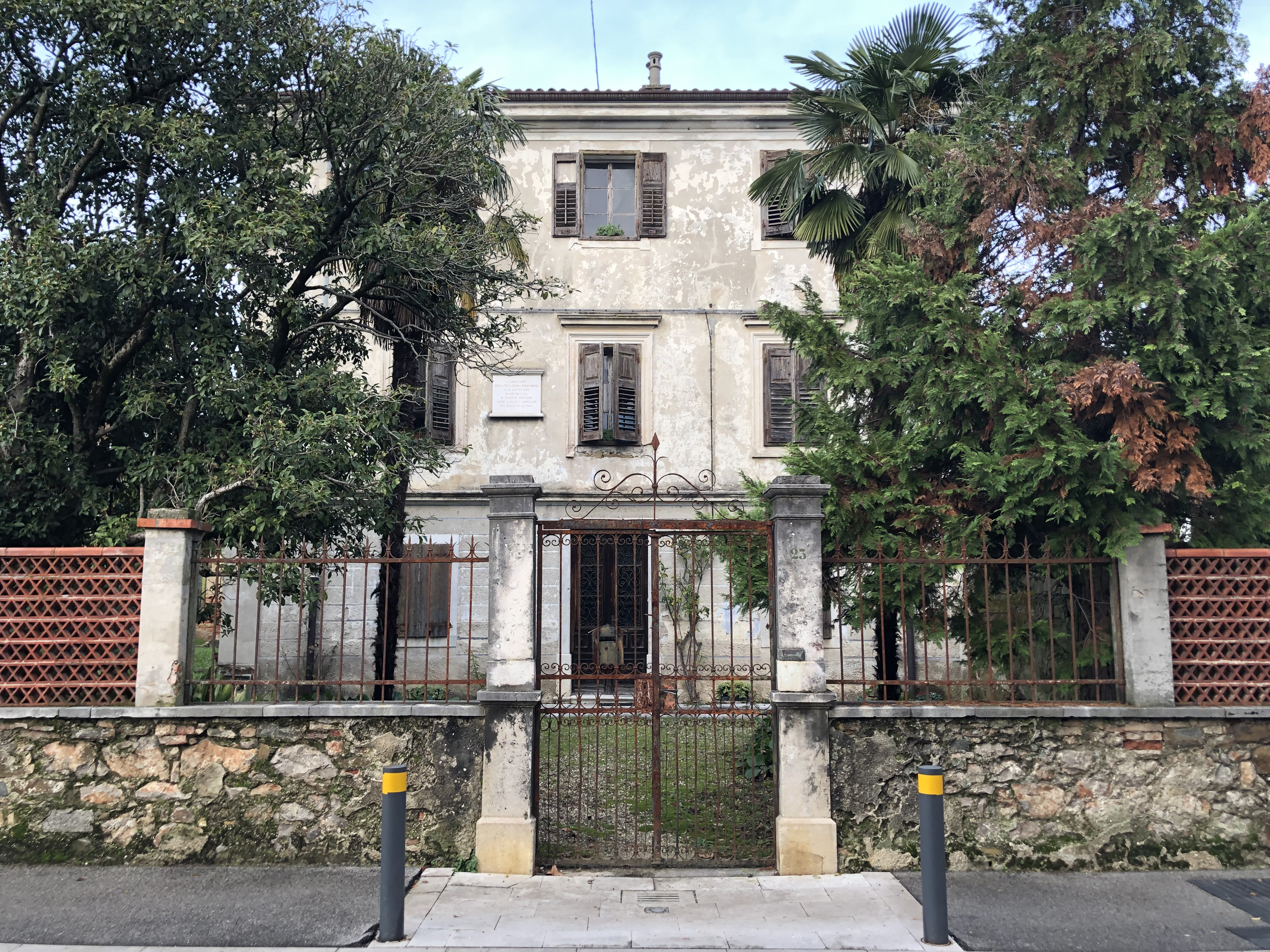
Villa Tomadoni

== Monuments and Places of Interest ==
=== Religious Architecture ===
- Cathedral of Sant'Adalbert, which houses the Cathedral Museum
- Church of San Leopoldo
- Church of Santa Caterina, also known as the Sanctuary of the Mystical Rose.
- Church of the Blessed Virgin of Help, on the slopes of Mount Quarin.
- Church of San Giovanni Battista, also known as the Church of Santa Lucia.
- Church of Santa Maria, also known as the Church of Santa Apollonia.
- Church of San Giorgio, built on the ruins of a castle destroyed in the 13th century.
- Church of Santo Stefano in Giassico.
- Church of San Lorenzo in the hamlet of Brazzano.
- Church of San Rocco in the hamlet of Brazzano.

=== Civil Architecture ===
- Palazzo Locatelli, the seat of the town hall and, since 2002, the seat of the local civic museum and the municipal wine shop.
- Villa Tomadoni, located on Via Piave, where the Armistice of Cormons was signed.
- Palazzo Taccò-Aita.
- Piazza Libertà with the statue of Emperor Maximilian I of Habsburg.

=== Military Architecture ===
- Cormons Castle

== Demographics ==
According to the Italian census of 1971, 4.4% of the population was of Slovene ethnicity.

Historical population

Year	Pop.	±%
1861	?	—
1871	?	—
1881	?	—
1901	?	—
1911	?	—
1921	7,484	—

Year	Pop.	±%
1931	7,684	+2.7%
1936	7,327	−4.6%
1951	7,927	+8.2%
1961	7,766	−2.0%
1971	7,631	−1.7%
1981	7,835	+2.7%

Year	Pop.	±%
1991	7,553	−3.6%
2001	7,449	−1.4%
2011	7,543	+1.3%
2021	7,198	−4.6%

Source: Data from ISTAT

=== Ethnic groups and foreign minorities ===
As of December 31, 2024, there were 420 foreigners residing in the municipality, or 5.7% of the population.: The largest groups are listed below:

- Romania, 64
- Slovenia, 53
- China, 43
- Morocco, 33
- Serbia, 23

== Languages and dialects ==
In Cormons, alongside Italian, the population speaks Friulian. Pursuant to Resolution No. 2680 of August 3, 2001, issued by the Regional Council of Friuli-Venezia Giulia, the municipality is included in the territorial protection of the Friulian language for the purposes of Law 482/99, Regional Law 15/96, and Regional Law 29/2007.

The Slovenian language is also officially protected. It has historically been spoken in the hamlets of Plessiva and Zegla, formerly part of the municipality of Medana, as well as in small towns such as Novali.

== Human geography ==
Borgnano (Borgnan in Friulian, Bornjan in Slovenian) and Brazzano (Breçan in standard Friulian, Brezan in local Friulian, Bračan in Slovenian) are only considered hamlets.

== Economy ==
Cormons is a lively agritourism center in eastern Friuli, known for its production of internationally renowned wines, prosciutto, and cheeses.

== Transport ==
Cormons railway station: the station is located on the Udine–Trieste railway. The train services are operated by Trenitalia to Trieste, Udine, Treviso and Venice.

== Administration ==
Period		Office holder	Party	Title	Notes
9 giugno 2024	in carica	Roberto Felcaro	lista civica Direzione Cormons, Start	Mayor	

== Notable peoples ==
- Denis Godeas
- Sergio Marcon
- Valentino Pittoni

== Twin towns ==
- Friesach, Austria 1984
- Brda, Slovenia
- Tokaj, Hungary
