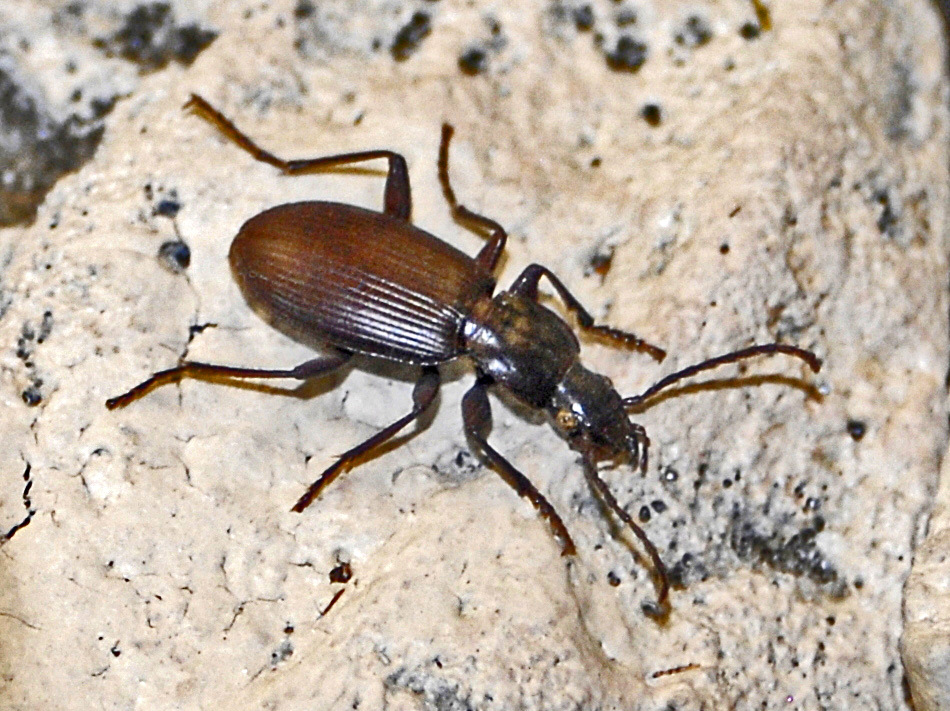
- Laemostenus janthinus

Scientific classification
- Domain: Eukaryota
- Kingdom: Animalia
- Phylum: Arthropoda
- Class: Insecta
- Order: Coleoptera
- Suborder: Adephaga
- Superfamily: Caraboidea
- Family: Carabidae
- Subfamily: Platyninae
- Tribe: Sphodrini
- Genus: Laemostenus
- Species: L. janthinus

Binomial name
- Laemostenus janthinus (Duftschmid, 1812)

= Laemostenus janthinus =

Species of beetle

Laemostenus janthinus is a species in the beetle family Carabidae.

== Subspecies ==
- Laemostenus janthinus coeruleus (Dejean, 1828)
- Laemostenus janthinus janthinus (Duftschmid, 1812)

== Description ==
Laemostenus janthinus can reach a length of about 14–17.5 millimetres (0.55–0.69 in). It is a nocturnal predator of other small arthropods.

== Distribution ==
This species can be found in Austria, Bosnia, Croatia, France, Italy, Poland, Slovenia and Switzerland.

== Habitat ==
This species inhabits forests and Alpine prairies at an elevation of 2000–2400 meters above sea level.
