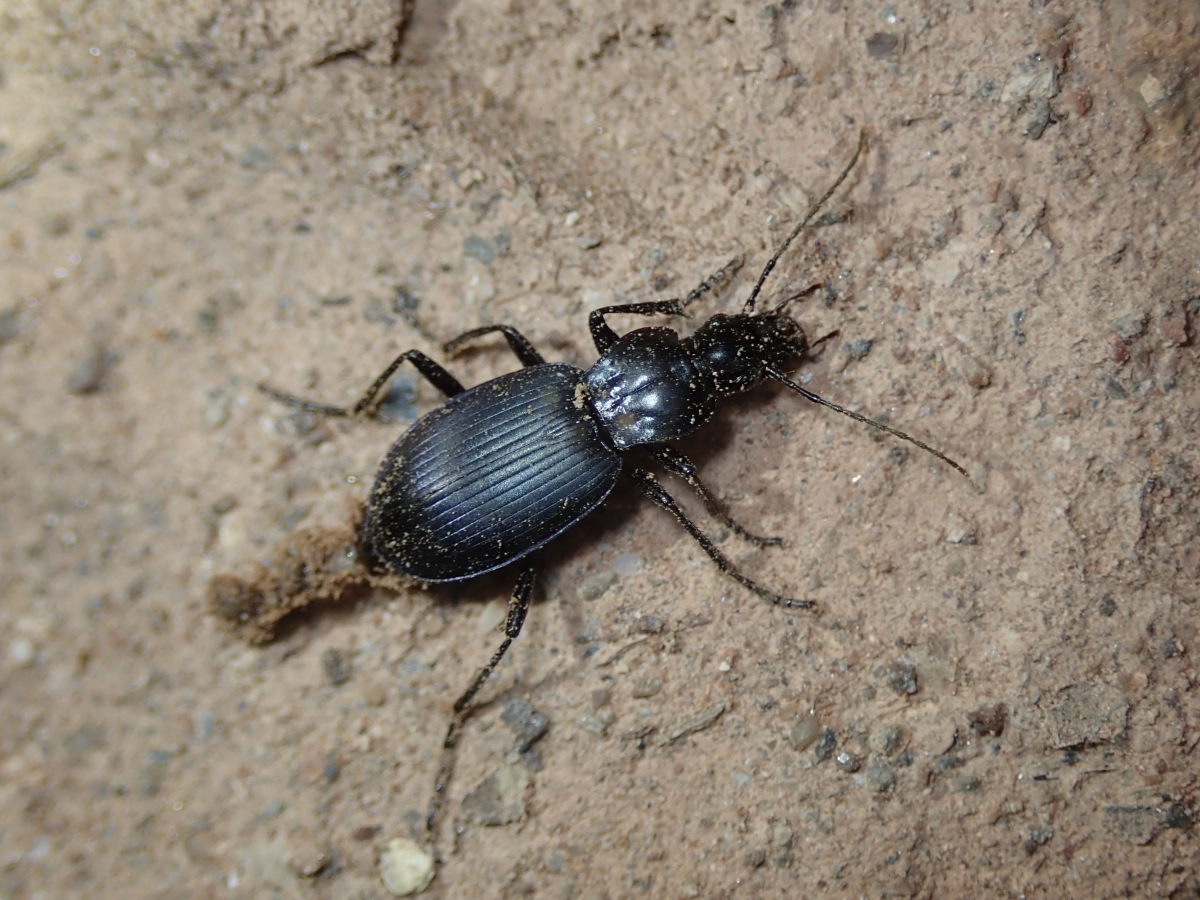

Scientific classification
- Kingdom: Animalia
- Phylum: Arthropoda
- Clade: Pancrustacea
- Class: Insecta
- Order: Coleoptera
- Suborder: Adephaga
- Family: Carabidae
- Genus: Laemostenus
- Species: L. terricola

Binomial name
- Laemostenus terricola (Herbst, 1784)

= Laemostenus terricola =

Species of beetle

Laemostenus terricola is a species of ground beetle native to Europe.
