= Zuppini family =

Italian noble family

The Zuppini were an Italian noble family. The Zuppini possibly originated from Gradisca. According to some sources they moved to Gradisca in the early 16th century, together with other patrician families. They became part of the nobility of the Holy Roman Empire as hereditary peers in the early 16th century. In the 17th century, they became Counts of Farra d'Isonzo, where they built a chapel between 1665 and 1669.

== History ==
The Zuppini retreated from occupied Gradisca to Farra in the 17th century, during the War of Gradisca. They had been elevated to the Austrian peerage 34 years earlier. The Zuppini had been declared noble in perpetuo by Ferdinand II, Archduke of Austria, the younger brother of Emperor Maximilian II, for the merits of Agostino, his son Giammaria (both Doctors of Law) and his other son Giambattista, and for the loyal services they had rendered to the Crown.

Giovanni Maria Zuppini, a member of the Zuppini family, was Podestà of Rovereto from September 27, 1578 to December 11, 1580.

In 1665, Emperor Leopold I confirmed the noble title of the Zuppini to the three brothers Giovanni Battista, Antonio and Filippo. Between 1665 and 1669, Count Giovanni Battista Zuppini built a chapel dedicated to the Immaculate Conception, fulfilling the vow he had made to build it should he heal from an illness. It is the oldest church in the archdiocese named after the Immaculate Conception.

== Origin of the family name ==
The Zuppini originated from Gradisca. The name might be related to terms zupano, zuppan, Italian spellings of Župan, a Slavic noble and administrative title. Further, "zupano" was once used by Italians of Friuli to refer to the head of a maso.
