= San Lorenzo Isontino =

- Comune
- Comune di San Lorenzo Isontino
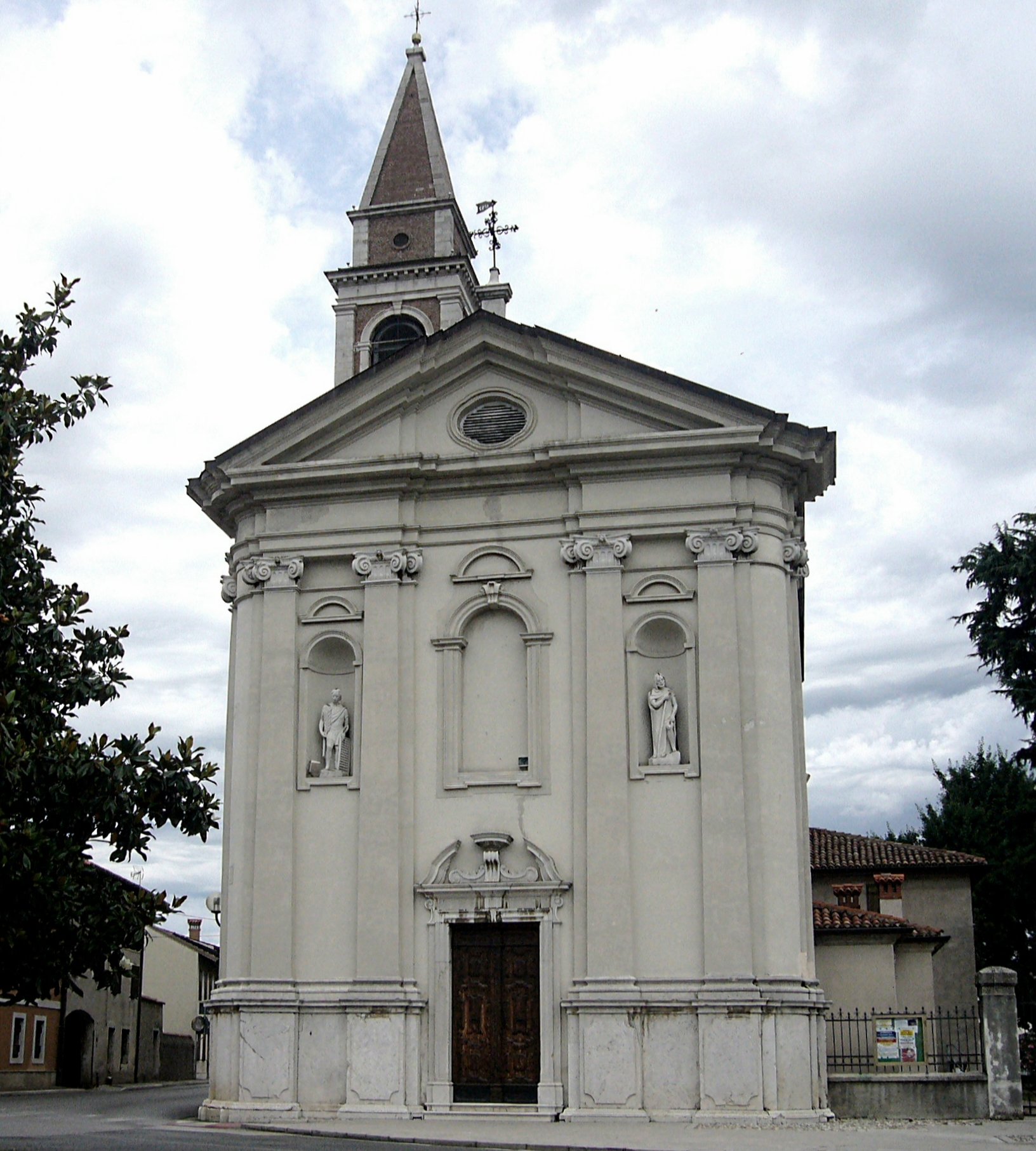

- Location within Italy Location within Friuli-Venezia Giulia
- Coordinates: 45°56′N 13°32′E
- Country: Italy
- Region: Friuli-Venezia Giulia
- Province: Gorizia (GO)

Government
  - Mayor: Ezio Clocchiatti

Area
  - Total: 4.4 km^{2} (1.7 sq mi)
- Elevation: 54 m (177 ft)

Population (Dec. 2004)
  - Total: 1,454
  - Density: 330/km^{2} (860/sq mi)
- Demonym: Sanlorenzini
- Time zone: UTC+1 (CET)
  - Summer (DST): UTC+2 (CEST)
- Postal code: 34070
- Dialing code: 0481
- Website: Official website

San Lorenzo Isontino (Friulian: San Lurinz; Slovene: Šlovrenc ob Soči) is a comune (municipality) in the Regional decentralization entity of Gorizia in the Italian region of Friuli-Venezia Giulia, located about 40 kilometres (25 mi) northwest of Trieste and about 6 kilometres (4 mi) west of Gorizia.

San Lorenzo Isontino borders the following municipalities: Capriva del Friuli, Farra d'Isonzo, Moraro, Mossa.
