= Mossa, Friuli Venezia Giulia =

Mossa
- Comune
- Comune di Mossa
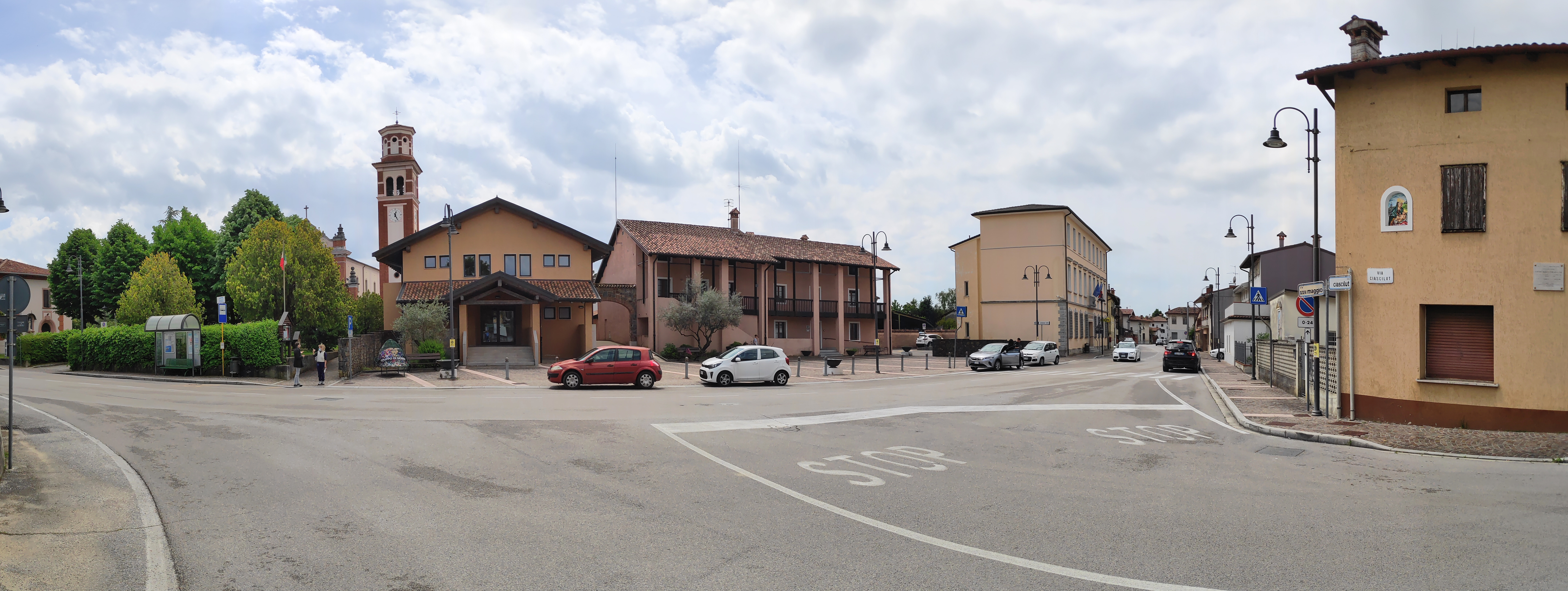

- Location within Italy Location within Friuli-Venezia Giulia
- Coordinates: 45°56′N 13°33′E
- Country: Italy
- Region: Friuli-Venezia Giulia
- Province: Gorizia (GO)
- Frazioni: Villa Blanchis, Valisella

Government
  - Mayor: Emanuela Russian

Area
  - Total: 6.1 km^{2} (2.4 sq mi)
- Elevation: 59 m (194 ft)

Population (Dec. 2004)
  - Total: 1,689
  - Density: 280/km^{2} (720/sq mi)
- Time zone: UTC+1 (CET)
  - Summer (DST): UTC+2 (CEST)
- Postal code: 34070
- Dialing code: 0481
- Website: Official website

Mossa (Slovene: Moš; Friulian: Mosse) is a comune (municipality) in the Regional decentralization entity of Gorizia in the Italian region of Friuli-Venezia Giulia, located about 40 kilometres (25 mi) northwest of Trieste and about 5 kilometres (3 mi) west of Gorizia.

The name is derived from the Old German Moos Au.

Mossa borders the following municipalities: Capriva del Friuli, Farra d'Isonzo, Gorizia, San Floriano del Collio, San Lorenzo Isontino.
