= Romans d'Isonzo =

- Comune
- Comune di Romans d'Isonzo
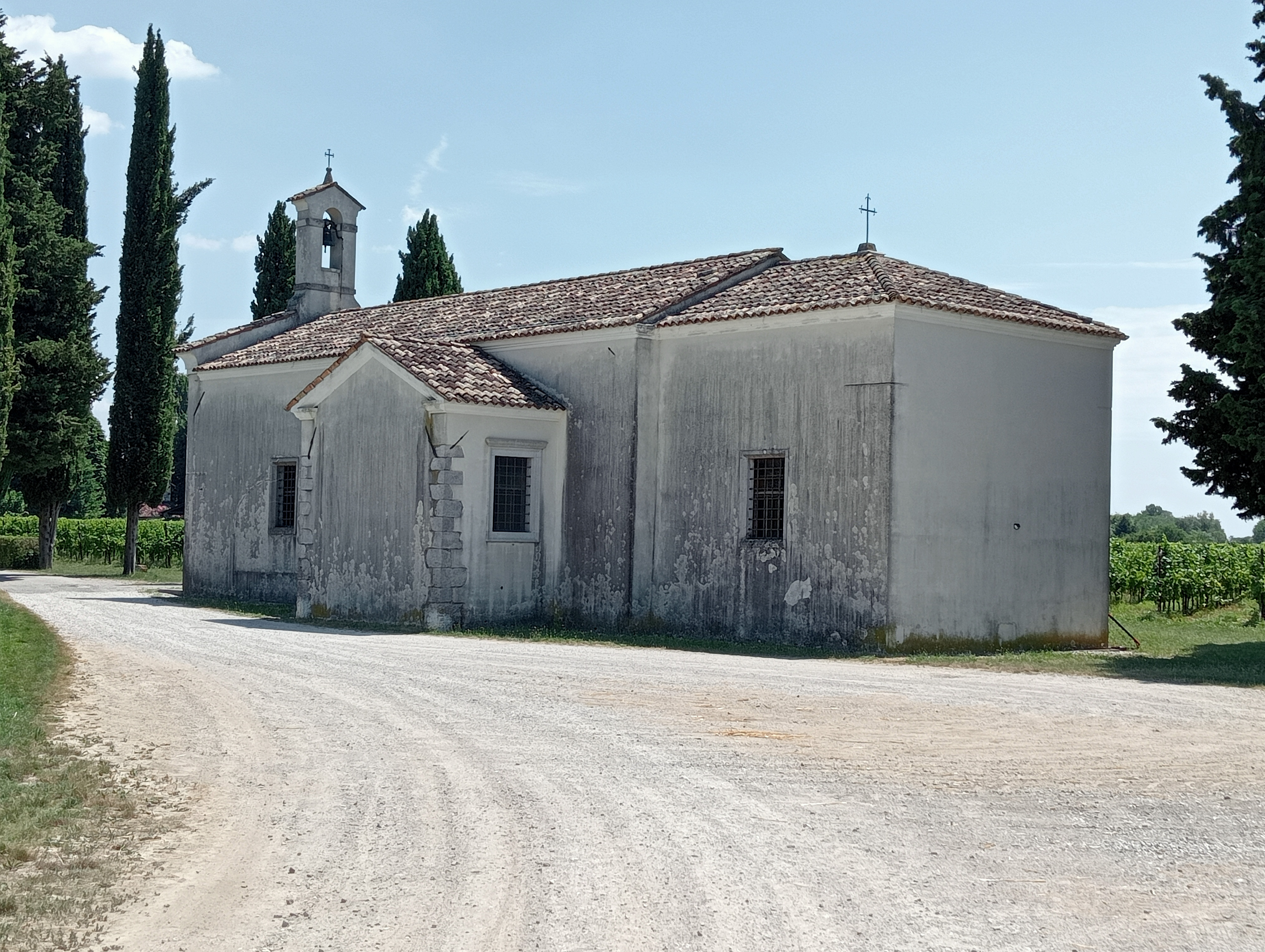
- Church of Beata Vergine Lauretana

- Location within Italy Location within Friuli-Venezia Giulia
- Coordinates: 45°53′N 13°26′E
- Country: Italy
- Region: Friuli-Venezia Giulia
- Province: Gorizia (GO)
- Frazioni: Fratta, Versa

Government
  - Mayor: Michele Calligaris

Area
  - Total: 15.4 km^{2} (5.9 sq mi)
- Elevation: 23 m (75 ft)

Population (Dec. 2004)
  - Total: 3,611
  - Density: 234/km^{2} (607/sq mi)
- Demonym: Romanesi
- Time zone: UTC+1 (CET)
  - Summer (DST): UTC+2 (CEST)
- Postal code: 34076
- Dialing code: 0481
- Website: Official website

Romans d'Isonzo (Friulian: Romans dal Lusinç; Slovene: Romanž na Soči) is a comune (municipality) in the Regional decentralization entity of Gorizia in the Italian region of Friuli-Venezia Giulia, located about 40 kilometres (25 mi) northwest of Trieste and about 15 kilometres (9 mi) southwest of Gorizia.

Romans d'Isonzo borders the following municipalities: Gradisca d'Isonzo, Mariano del Friuli, Medea, San Vito al Torre, Tapogliano, Villesse.
