= List of Podestà of Rovereto =

Podestà of Rovereto
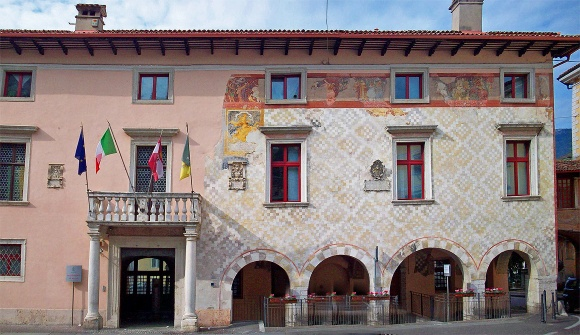
- Palazzo Pretorio on Piazza del Podestà was the residence of the podestà
- Style: His Serenity
- Residence: Palazzo Pretorio
- Appointer: Serenissima Signoria; Holy Roman Emperor
- Formation: 1417
- First holder: Andrea Valiero

The following is a list of the Podestà of Rovereto from 1417 until 1752, ordered by the dates of their assignments which are put in parentheses.

For about a century (from 1416 until 1509) Rovereto belonged to the Serenissima. The Palazzo Pretorio, or Palazzo Podestà, was the abode of the podestà. The palace is typically Venetian, and was built by Andrea Valier, Rovereto's first podestà, upon the Venetians' arrival in 1416. While the city was under Venetian sway for almost a century, today the Palazzo dei Podestà and the Castle are the only vestiges of Venetian rule. With the conclusion of the war against Venice conducted by the League of Cambrai and the Venetian defeat at the Battle of Agnadello, Rovereto was occupied by Imperial troops. Maximilian I confirmed the privileges and the statutes to the fedeli consoli e cittadini e alla comunità della città di Rovereto (loyal consuls and citizens and the community of Rovereto), thus confirming Rovereto's rank of city.

== 15th century ==
- Andrea Valiero (1417–1424)
- Francesco Basadonna (1424–1427)
- Ermolao Zaccaria (1427–1432)
- Paolo Foscolo (1432–1434)
- Andrea Gussoni (1434–1435)
- Leonardo Marcello (1435–1438)
- Pietro Coppo (1438–1441)
- Giacopo Dolfino (1441–1442)
- Luca Caravello (1442–1444)
- Giovanni Soranzo (1444–1447)
- Andrea Calbo (1447–1450)
- Andrea Molino (1450–1451)
- Francesco Calbo (1451–1454)
- Luca Pisani (1454–1457)
- Matteo Memo (1457–1458)
- Moisè Contarini (1458–1462)
- Natal Cornaro (1462–1464)
- Bartolomeo Pesaro (1464–1467)
- Franscesco Nani (1467–1470)
- Andrea Foscolo (1470–1473)
- Alvise Quirini (1473–1476)
- Pietro Veniero (1476–1478)
- Gabriel Pizzamano (1478–1482)
- Francesco Navagiero (1482–1485)
- Andrea Michieli (1485–1486)
- Nicolò Priuli (1486–1487)
- Tommaso Duodo (1487–1489)
- Paolo Malpiero (1489–1490)
- Girolamo Marino (1490–1493)
- Ettore Tagliapietra (1493–1494)
- Girolamo Gritti (1494–1497)
- Niccolò Pesaro (1497–1500)

== 16th century ==
- Maffeo Micheli (1500–1502)
- Girolamo Nani (1502–1504)
- Gio: Franscesco Pisani (1504–1507)
- Bartolomeo Dandolo (1507–1509)

Rovereto annexed to the Holy Roman Empire

- Niccolò Franzini (1509)
- Franscesco degli Agostini (1509–1511)
- Gio: Antonio Dorigati di Tesino (1511–1513)
- Gio: Paolo Schratemperg Trentino (1513–1516)
- Carlo Manzoni Padovano (1516–1517)
- Simon Buttalosso Trentino (1517–1518)
- Gio: Andrea Scudelli Trentino (1518–1520)
- Giulio Manzoni Padovano (1520–1522)
- Antonio Gardellino Bassanese (1522–1525)
- Gio: Andrea Scudelli Trentino (1525–1526)
- Alessandro Ghelfo Trentino (1526–1529)
- Tommaso Tabarelli da Terlago (1529–1532)
- Girolamo Thonner (1532–1536)
- Simon Guarienti da Rallo (1536–1537)
- Pietro Alessandrini Trentino (1537–1539)
- Gervasio Alberti Trentino (1539–1540)
- Domenico Calvetto (1540–1541)
- Antonio Schratemperg (1541–1543)
- Gio: Giacopo Malanotte (1543–1544)
- Francesco Scudelli (1544–1545)
- Gio: Paolo Schratemperg (1545–1547)
- Girolamo Grandi (1547–1548)
- Francesco Aliprandi Mantovano (1548–1549)
- Francesco Cazzuffi Trentino (1549–1551)
- Francesco Queta Trentino (1551–1552)
- Odorico Costeda Trentino (1552–1554)
- Gerardo Berneri di Arco (1554–1555)
- Alberto Alberti Trentino (1555–1558)
- Bernardino Malanotte (1558–1560)
- Paolo Tesino (1560–1561)
- Graziadeo Rolandini (1561–1563)
- Girolamo Pilati (1563–1565)
- Agostino Argnocco (1565–1566)
- Giambattista Calavino (1566–1569)
- Girolamo Cajano (1569–1570)
- Girolamo Pilati (1570–1572)
- Antonio Queta Trentino (1572–1573)
- Antonio Bianchi (1573–1575)
- Girolamo Pilati (1575–1576)
- Giorgio del Mestre di Gradisca (1576–1578)
- Gio: Maria Zuppini di Gradisca (1578–1580)
- Giulio Marini di Gradisca (1580–1582)
- Lauro Basilio di Trieste (1582–1584)
- Vincenzo Mainoldi Cremonese (1584–1586)
- Orazio Mainoldi Cremonese (1586–1588)
- Giorgio Savoni di Riva (1588–1590)
- Alessandro Alberti Trentino (1590–1591)
- Giorgio Savoni di Riva (1591–1593)
- Cristoforo Campi di Cles (1593–1595)
- Girolamo Pilati Trentino (1595–1597)
- Antonio Leone di Gorizia (1597–1599)
- Biagio Rith di Gradisca (1599–1601)

== 17th century ==
- Carlo Rusca di Pergine (1601–1603)
- Livio Pompeati Trentino (1603–1605)
- Giulio Maggi Cremonese (1605–1607)
- Pier Francesco Noceti Pontremolese (1607–1611)
- Gio: Paolo Dodo Pontremolese (1611–1615)
- Giambattista Codazzi di Lodi (1615–1617)
- Felice Alberti di Pergine (1617–1619)
- Andrea Pompeati Trentino (1619–1624)
- Pietro Pilati Trentino (1624–1626)
- Paolo Antonio Barboi Cremonese (1626–1629)
- Enrico Andrea Applani Milanese (1629–1633)
- Antonio Maria Novelli Pontremolese (1633–1637)
- Lorenzo Torresani di Cles (1637–1639)
- Gio. Antonio Odescalchi di Como (1639–1644)
- Mainardo Trussi Cremonese (1644–1648)
- Fulvio Gallo Pontremolese (1648–1652)
- Francesco Andreasi Mantovano (1652–1653)
- Giovanni Cataneo di Tortona (1653–1654)
- Girolamo Aroldo di Casal Maggiore (1654–1659)
- Simon Pietro Barbi di Cembra (1659–1664)
- Stefao Maraffi Pontremolese (1664–1667)
- Francesco Maria Noceti Pontremolese (1667–1670)
- Carlo Spadazza di Fusignano (1670–1672)
- Stefano Marachi Pontremolese (1672–1675)
- Francesco Maraffi Pontremolese (1675–1681)
- Zaccaria Serati Pontremolese (1681–1686)
- Giovanni Mantegazza Milanese (1686–1688)
- Zaccaria Serati Pontremolese (1688–1694)
- Gio. Carlo Salvadori di Riva (1694–1698)
- Francesco Tranquillini di Mori (1698–1701)

== 18th century ==
- Gio. Carlo Medici Modanese (1701–1705)
- Francesco Tranquillini di Mori (1705–1710)
- Francesco Ettori Imolese (1710–1714)
- Gio. Sebastiano Vespignani (1714–1719)
- Gio. Carlo Salvadori di Riva (1719–1720)
- Carlo Andrea Giovanni Mantovano (1720–1724)
- Gio. Sebastiano Vespignani Imolese (1724–1729)
- Giuseppe Finali Milanese (1729–1732)
- Cesare Tommaso dalla Porta Milanese (1732–1738)
- Antonio Loria Mantovano (1738–1745)
- Domenico Antonio Nocker dal Borgo di val Sugana (1745–1752)
- Felice Chiusole da Chiusole (1752)

== Bibliography ==
- Girolamo Tartarotti. Memorie antiche di Rovereto e de' luoghi circonvicini, raccolte, e pubblicate da Girolamo Tartarotti roveretano, 1754.
