= San Floriano del Collio =

San Floriano del Collio Števerjan (Slovene)
- Comune
- Comune di San Floriano del Collio; Občina Števerjan
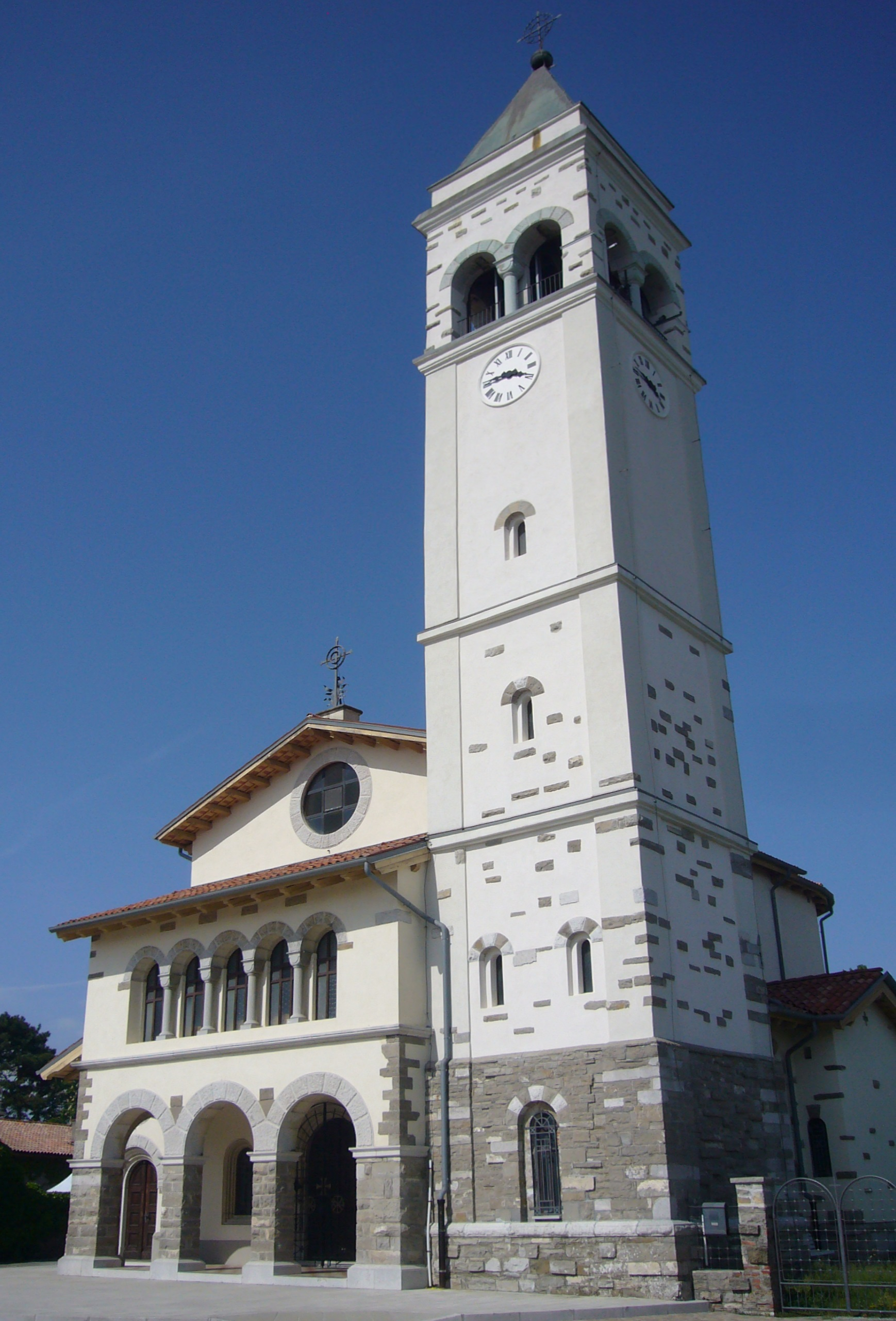

- Location within Italy Location within Friuli-Venezia Giulia
- Coordinates: 45°59′N 13°35′E
- Country: Italy
- Region: Friuli-Venezia Giulia
- Province: Gorizia (GO)
- Frazioni: Bucuie/Bukovje, Giasbana/Jazbine, Uclanzi/Klanec, Scedina/Škedenj, Valerisce/Valerišče

Government
  - Mayor: Franca Padovan

Area
  - Total: 10.6 km^{2} (4.1 sq mi)
- Elevation: 276 m (906 ft)

Population (Dec. 2004)
  - Total: 807
  - Density: 76.1/km^{2} (197/sq mi)
- Time zone: UTC+1 (CET)
  - Summer (DST): UTC+2 (CEST)
- Postal code: 34070
- Dialing code: 0481

San Floriano del Collio (Slovene: Števerjan; Friulian: San Florean dal Cuei) is a comune (municipality) in the Regional decentralization entity of Gorizia in the Italian region of Friuli-Venezia Giulia, located about 40 kilometres (25 mi) northwest of Trieste and about 6 kilometres (4 mi) northwest of Gorizia, on the border with Slovenia, and borders the following municipalities: Brda (Slovenia), Capriva del Friuli, Cormons, Gorizia, Mossa.

San Floriano del Collio localities include Grojna/Groina, Ščedno/Scedina, Bukovje/Bucuie, Valerišče/Valerisce, Jazbine/Giasbana, Aščevo/Asci, Križišče/Bivio, and Sovenca/Sovenza. As of 31 December 2004, it had a population of 807 and an area of 10.6 square kilometres (4.1 mi^{2}).

== Ethnic composition ==
91.4% of the population were Slovenes according to the 1971 census. Most of the locals speak the Brda dialect of Slovene, which is traditionally present on the whole territory of the municipality.

== Demographic evolution ==
Historical population

| Year | Pop. | ±% |
|---|---|---|
| 1861 | ? | — |
| 1871 | ? | — |
| 1881 | ? | — |
| 1901 | ? | — |
| 1911 | ? | — |

| Year | Pop. | ±% |
|---|---|---|
| 1921 | 1,199 | — |
| 1931 | 1,133 | −5.5% |
| 1936 | 1,127 | −0.5% |
| 1951 | 1,041 | −7.6% |
| 1961 | 924 | −11.2% |

| Year | Pop. | ±% |
|---|---|---|
| 1971 | 818 | −11.5% |
| 1981 | 884 | +8.1% |
| 1991 | 835 | −5.5% |
| 2001 | 821 | −1.7% |

Source: Data from ISTAT

== See also ==
- Julian March
- Gorizia and Gradisca
- Slovene Lands
