= Savogna d'Isonzo =

Savogna d'Isonzo - Sovodnje ob Soči Sovodnje ob Soči (Slovene)
- Comune
- Comune di Savogna d'Isonzo; Občina Sovodnje ob Soči
- Coat of arms

- Location within Italy Location within Friuli-Venezia Giulia
- Coordinates: 45°55′N 13°35′E
- Country: Italy
- Region: Friuli-Venezia Giulia
- Province: Gorizia (GO)
- Frazioni: Gabria-Gabrje, Peci-Peč, Rubbia-Rubije, Rupa, San Michele del Carso-Vrh sv. Mihaela

Government
  - Mayor: Luca Pisk

Area
  - Total: 16.4 km^{2} (6.3 sq mi)
- Elevation: 235 m (771 ft)

Population (2014)
  - Total: 1,744
  - Density: 106/km^{2} (275/sq mi)
- Demonym: Savognesi (Sovodenjci in Slovenian)
- Time zone: UTC+1 (CET)
  - Summer (DST): UTC+2 (CEST)
- Postal code: 34070
- Dialing code: 0481
- Website: Official website

Savogna d'Isonzo (Slovene: Sovodnje ob Soči; Friulian: Savogne di Gurize) is a comune (municipality) in the Regional decentralization entity of Gorizia in the Italian region of Friuli-Venezia Giulia, located about 35 kilometres (22 mi) northwest of Trieste and about 3 kilometres (1.9 mi) southwest of Gorizia, on the border with Slovenia. The name of the village comes from the Slovene word sovodnje 'confluence'. Near Savogna, in fact, the Vipava River flows into the Isonzo at the conjunction of the Karst Plateau and the Vipava Valley.

== Ethnic composition ==
92% of the population was of Slovene ethnicity according to the Italian census of 1971.

== Main sights ==
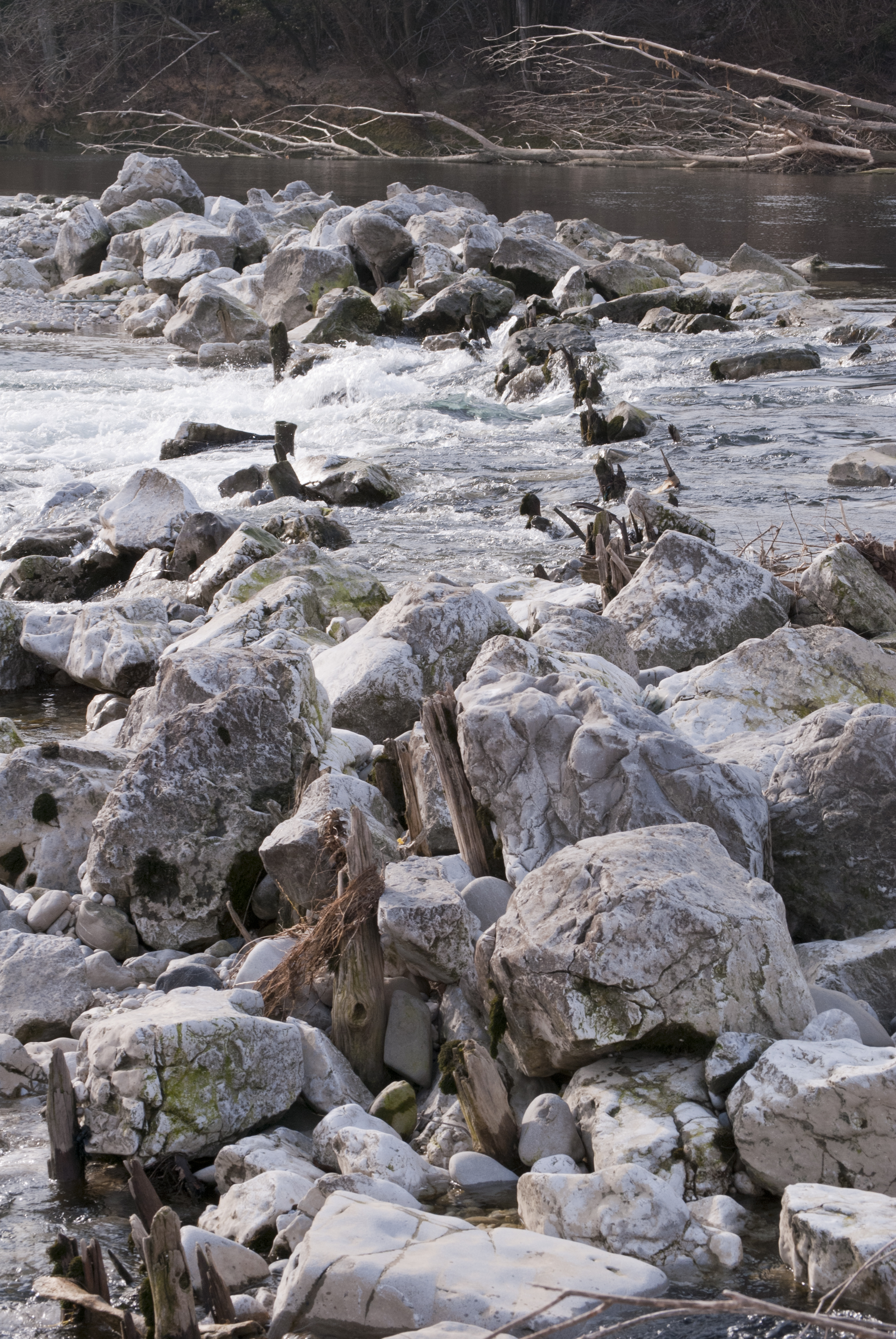
Ruins of the Roman bridge

- Church of San Martino, at Savogna/Sovodnje
- Castle of Rubbia/Rubije
- Church of San Nicolò, at Gabria/Gabrje
- Small square of Gabria/Gabrje
- Grotta Regina del Carso

== Twin towns ==
- Škofja Loka, Slovenia

== See also ==
- Julian March
- Gorizia and Gradisca
- Slovene Lands
