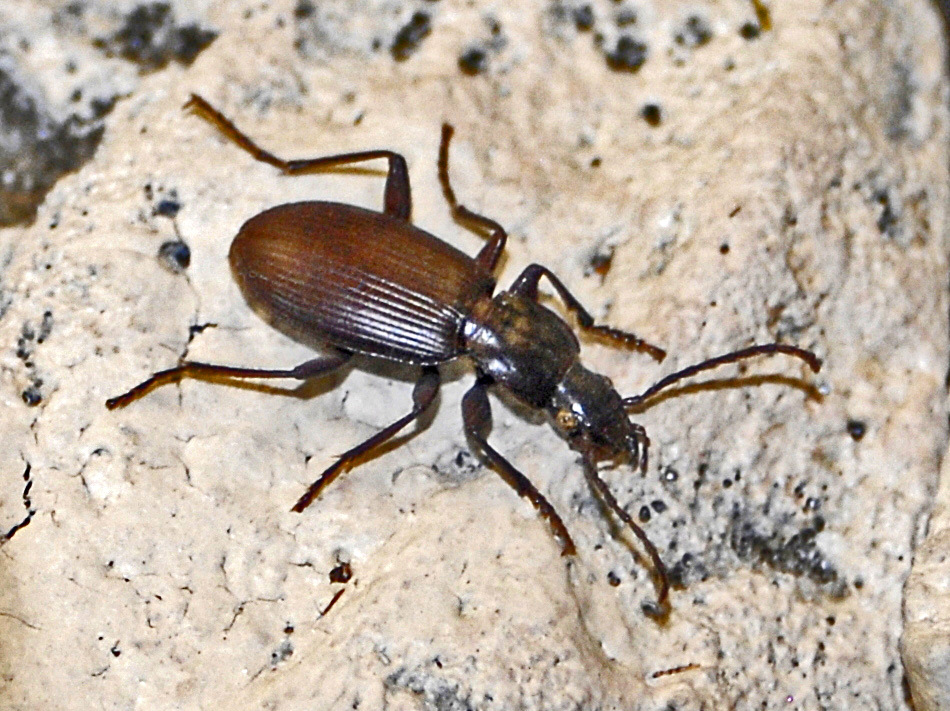
- Laemostenus janthinus

Scientific classification
- Domain: Eukaryota
- Kingdom: Animalia
- Phylum: Arthropoda
- Class: Insecta
- Order: Coleoptera
- Suborder: Adephaga
- Family: Carabidae
- Subfamily: Platyninae
- Tribe: Sphodrini
- Genus: Laemostenus; Bonelli, 1810

Subgenera and species
- See text

= Laemostenus =

Genus of beetles

Laemostenus is a genus of ground beetles present on all continents on Earth, except Antarctica.

There are nearly 200 species in the genus, divided into several subgenera. Beetles of the genus are about 8 to 28 millimeters long. Many are dark in color with a blue or purple sheen. Others, especially subterranean and cave-dwelling species, are depigmented, much lighter in color, with reduced eyes.

== Selected subgenera and species ==
- Laemostenus (Actenipus)
  - Laemostenus acutangulus
  - Laemostenus angustatus
  - Laemostenus carinatus
  - Laemostenus caussolensis
  - Laemostenus dubaulti
  - Laemostenus elegans
  - Laemostenus ginellae
  - Laemostenus gobbii
  - Laemostenus krueperi
  - Laemostenus latialis
  - Laemostenus macropus
  - Laemostenus meaillensis
  - Laemostenus oblongus
  - Laemostenus obtusus
  - Laemostenus peloponnesiacus
  - Laemostenus pippiai
  - Laemostenus plasoni
  - Laemostenus thessalicus
- Laemostenus (Antisphodrus)
  - Laemostenus andalusiacus
  - Laemostenus barrancoi
  - Laemostenus bermejae
  - Laemostenus beroni
  - Laemostenus casalei
  - Laemostenus cavicola
  - Laemostenus cazorlensis
  - Laemostenus elongatus
  - Laemostenus giachinoi
  - Laemostenus insubricus
  - Laemostenus jailensis
  - Laemostenus lassallei
  - Laemostenus ledereri
  - Laemostenus leonhardi
  - Laemostenus levantinus
  - Laemostenus monguzzii
  - Laemostenus navaricus
  - Laemostenus peleus
  - Laemostenus reissi
  - Laemostenus schreibersii
  - Laemostenus seguranus
- Laemostenus (Ceuthosthenes)
  - Laemostenus mauritanicus
- Laemostenus (Eucryptotrichus)
  - Laemostenus pinicola
- Laemostenus (Laemostenus)
  - Laemostenus alpinus
  - Laemostenus barbarus
  - Laemostenus complanatus
  - Laemostenus dalmatinus
  - Laemostenus janthinus
  - Laemostenus magellensis
  - Laemostenus quadricollis
  - Laemostenus venustus
- Laemostenus (Pristonychus)
  - Laemostenus algerinus
  - Laemostenus andreevi
  - Laemostenus baeticus
  - Laemostenus cimmerius
  - Laemostenus conspicuus
  - Laemostenus euxinicus
  - Laemostenus sericeus
  - Laemostenus stussineri
  - Laemostenus terricola
  - Laemostenus tichyi
- Laemostenus (Sphodroides)
  - Laemostenus cordicollis
  - Laemostenus picicornis
