= Orotrechus =

Scientific classification
- Kingdom: Animalia
- Phylum: Arthropoda
- Class: Insecta
- Order: Coleoptera
- Suborder: Adephaga
- Family: Carabidae
- Subfamily: Trechinae
- Genus: Orotrechus; J. Muller, 1913

Genus of beetles

Orotrechus is a genus of troglobitic beetles in the family Carabidae, containing the following species:

- Orotrechus caranthiacus Mandl, 1940
- Orotrechus cavallensis Jeannel, 1928
- Orotrechus dallarmii Daffner, 1987
- Orotrechus euganeus Pace, 1974
- Orotrechus fabianii Gestro, 1900
- Orotrechus fiorii Alzona, 1899
- Orotrechus forojulensis Busulini, 1959
- Orotrechus gigas Vigna Taglianti, 1981
- Orotrechus giordanii Agazzi, 1957
- Orotrechus globulipennis Schaum, 1860
- Orotrechus gracilis Meggioiano, 1961
- Orotrechus haraldi Daffnan, 1990
- Orotrechus holdhausi Ganglbauer, 1904
- Orotrechus jamae C. Etonti & M. Etonti, 1979
- Orotrechus lucensis Scheibel, 1935
- Orotrechus mandriolae Ganglbauer, 1911
- Orotrechus martinellii Martinelli, 1987
- Orotrechus messai J. Muller, 1913
- Orotrechus montellensis Agazzi, 1956
- Orotrechus muellerianus Schatzmayr, 1907
- Orotrechus novaki Mlejnek, J. Moravec & Udrzal, 1994
- Orotrechus pavionis Maggiolaro, 1961
- Orotrechus pominii Tamanini, 1954
- Orotrechus puchneri Lebenbauer, 1998
- Orotrechus robustus Jeannel, 1928
- Orotrechus ruffoi Tamanini, 1954
- Orotrechus sabenelloi Daffner, 1983
- Orotrechus schwienbacheri Grottolo & Martinelli, 1991
- Orotrechus slapniki Drovenik, Miejnek & J. Moravec, 1997
- Orotrechus springeri J. Muller, 1928
- Orotrechus stephani J. Muller, 1913
- Orotrechus subpannonicus Daffner, 1994
- Orotrechus targionii Della Torre, 1881
- Orotrechus theresiae Casale, M. Etonti & Giachino, 1992
- Orotrechus torretassoi J. Muller, 1928
- Orotrechus venetianus Winkler, 1911
- Orotrechus vicentinus Castro, 1907
- Orotrechus winkleri Meggiolaro, 1959
