= Capriva del Friuli =

- Comune
- Comune di Capriva del Friuli
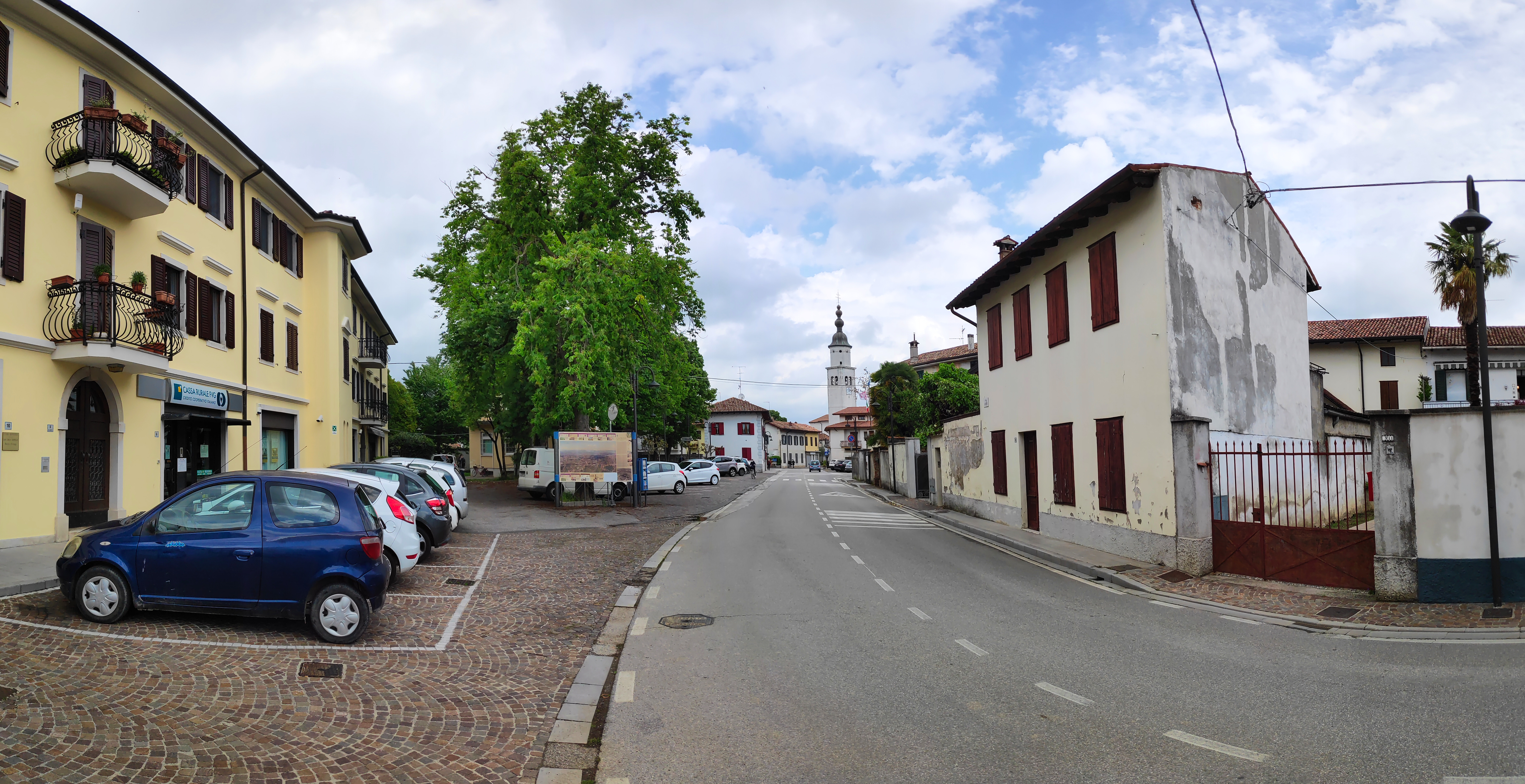

- Location within Italy Location within Friuli-Venezia Giulia
- Coordinates: 45°56′N 13°31′E
- Country: Italy
- Region: Friuli-Venezia Giulia
- Province: Gorizia (GO)
- Frazioni: Russiz, Spessa

Government
  - Mayor: Daniele Sergon

Area
  - Total: 6.2 km^{2} (2.4 sq mi)
- Elevation: 49 m (161 ft)

Population (Dec. 2004)
  - Total: 1,670
  - Density: 270/km^{2} (700/sq mi)
- Demonym: Caprivesi
- Time zone: UTC+1 (CET)
  - Summer (DST): UTC+2 (CEST)
- Postal code: 34070
- Dialing code: 0481
- Website: Official website

Capriva del Friuli (Slovene: Koprivno; Standard Friulian: Caprive; Southeastern Friulian: Capriva) is a comune (municipality) in the Regional decentralization entity of Gorizia in the Italian region of Friuli-Venezia Giulia, located about 40 kilometres (25 mi) northwest of Trieste and about 8 kilometres (5 mi) west of Gorizia.

Capriva del Friuli borders the following municipalities: Cormons, Moraro, Mossa, San Floriano del Collio, San Lorenzo Isontino.

The municipality is located in the hilly Collio region, noted for viticulture.

== History ==
The area was occupied in Roman times, after which it was subsumed into Lombardy. Around the year 1000, it came under the control of the Patriarchate of Aquileia, passing to the Venetians in 1428.

In the 16th century Capriva became part of the Habsburg territories, and continued to be ruled from Vienna until after the First World War, when it was transferred to Italy.
