= Province of Gorizia =

Coordinates: 45°56′23″N 13°37′24″E

Province of Gorizia Provincia di Gorizia (Italian) Goriška pokrajina (Slovene) Provincie di Gurize (Friulian)
- Province
- Regional Decentralization Entity of Gorizia
- Flag Coat of arms

- Location of the province of Gorizia in Italy
- Country: Italy
- Region: Friuli-Venezia Giulia
- Capital(s): Gorizia
- Municipalities: 25

Government
  - General director: Igor De Bastiani

Area
  - Total: 467.14 km^{2} (180.36 sq mi)

Population (2026)
  - Total: 138,717
  - Density: 296.95/km^{2} (769.10/sq mi)

GDP
  - Total: €3.656 billion (2015)
  - Per capita: €26,007 (2015)
- Time zone: UTC+1 (CET)
  - Summer (DST): UTC+2 (CEST)
- Postal code: 34070-34079, 34170
- Telephone prefix: 0431, 0481
- ISO 3166 code: IT-GO
- Vehicle registration: GO
- ISTAT code: 031

The province of Gorizia (Italian: provincia di Gorizia; Slovene: Goriška pokrajina; Friulian: provincie di Gurize) was a province in the autonomous region of Friuli-Venezia Giulia in Italy. Initially disbanded on 30 September 2017, it was reestablished in 2019 as the regional decentralization entity of Gorizia (Italian: ente di decentramento regionale di Gorizia; Slovene: enota deželne decentralizacije Gorica; Friulian: ent di decentrament regjonâl di Gurize), and was reactivated on 1 July 2020. Its capital is the city of Gorizia.

It has a population of 138,717 in an area of 467.14 square kilometres (180.36 sq mi) across its 25 municipalities. It has a coastal length of 47.6 kilometres (29.6 mi).

== History ==
Map of the municipalities of the province

It belonged to the province of Udine between 1924 and 1927 and the communes of Sonzia, Plezzo, Bergogna, Caporetto, Tolmino, Circhina, Santa Lucia d'Isonzo, Gracova Serravalle, Canale d'Isonzo, Cal di Canale, Idria, Montenero d'Idria, Castel Dobra, Salona d'Isonzo, Gargaro, Chiapovano, Aidussina, Santa Croce di Aidùssina, Cernizza Goriziana, Tarnova della Selva, Sambasso, Merna, Ranziano, Montespino, Opacchiasella, Temenizza, Rifembergo, Comeno, San Daniele del Carso, Zolla, Vipacco, San Martino di Quisca and San Vito di Vipacco, as well as the eastern part of Gorizia, were part of this province between 1918–1924 and 1927–1947. These communes are now part of Slovenia.

== Government ==
=== Municipalities ===
- Capriva del Friuli
- Cormons
- Doberdò del Lago
- Dolegna del Collio
- Farra d'Isonzo
- Fogliano Redipuglia
- Gorizia
- Gradisca d'Isonzo
- Grado
- Mariano del Friuli
- Medea
- Monfalcone
- Moraro
- Mossa
- Romans d'Isonzo
- Ronchi dei Legionari
- Sagrado
- San Canzian d'Isonzo
- San Floriano del Collio
- San Lorenzo Isontino
- San Pier d'Isonzo
- Savogna d'Isonzo
- Staranzano
- Turriaco
- Villesse

== Demographics ==
As of 2026, the population is 138,717, of which 49.9% are male, and 50.1% are female. Minors make up 13.6% of the population, and seniors make up 27.4%.

Around 11% of the population of the province is ethnically Slovenian. Italian legislation ensures the protection of the Slovene linguistic minority in 9 of the 25 municipalities which comprise the province. Three rural municipalities (Doberdò del Lago, Savogna d'Isonzo and San Floriano del Collio) have an ethnically Slovene majority, but the majority of native Slovene speakers in the province live in the urban area of Gorizia.

Historical population

Year	Pop.	±%
1861	-	—
1871	-	—
1881	-	—
1901	-	—
1911	-	—
1921	99,804	—
1931	114,310	+14.5%
1936	114,929	+0.5%

Year	Pop.	±%
1951	133,550	+16.2%
1961	137,745	+3.1%
1971	142,412	+3.4%
1981	144,726	+1.6%
1991	138,119	−4.6%
2001	136,491	−1.2%
2011	140,143	+2.7%
2021	137,899	−1.6%

Source: ISTAT

=== Immigration ===
As of 2025, immigrants make up 17.2% of the population. The 5 largest foreign countries of birth are Bangladesh, Romania, Slovenia, Bosnia and Herzegovina, and North Macedonia.

== See also ==
- Gorizia and Gradisca
- Julian March
- Slovene minority in Italy
