= Trivignano Udinese =

Trivignano Udinese Trivignan (Friulian)
- Comune
- Comune di Trivignano Udinese
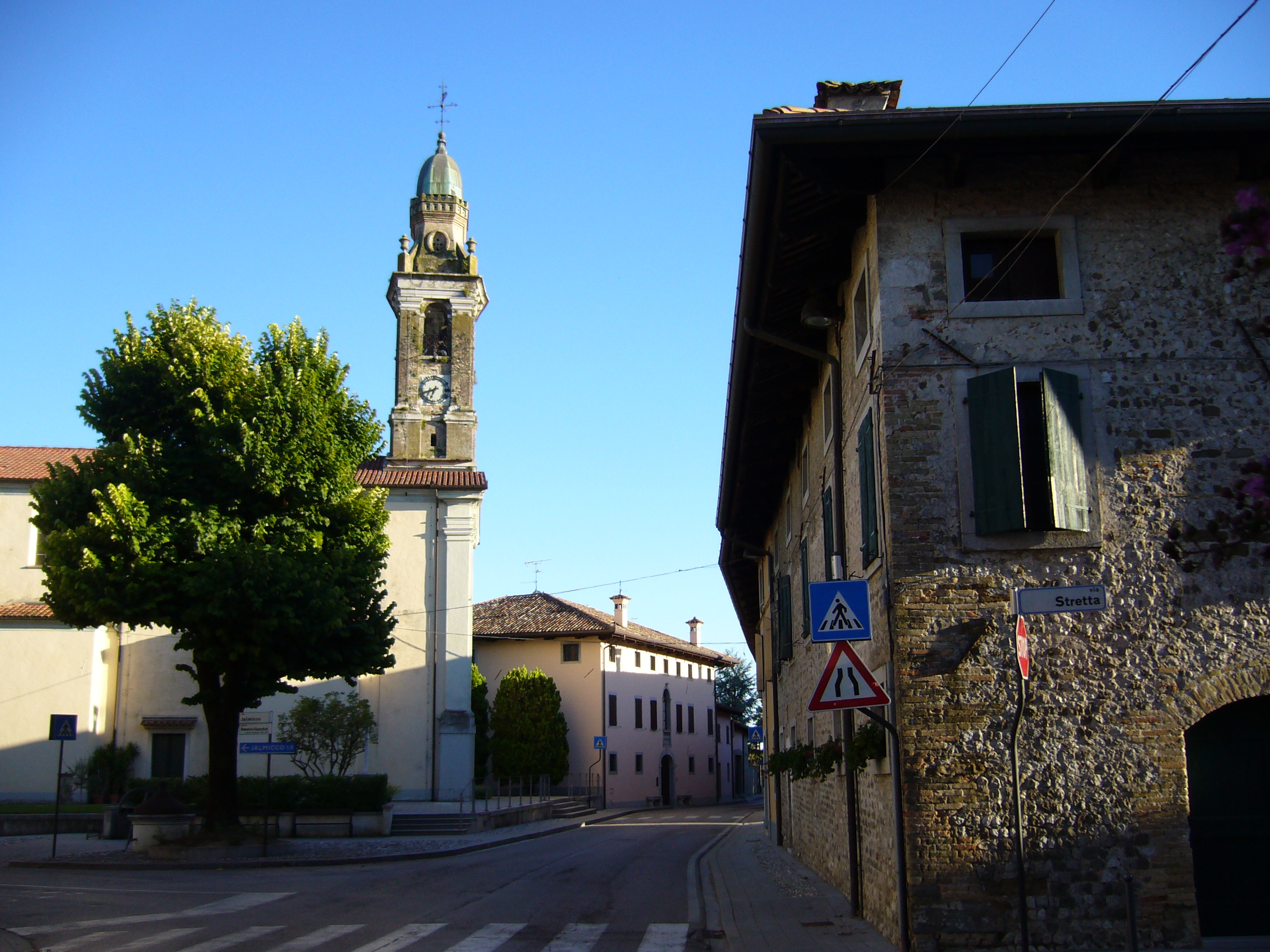
- View of Clauiano, a frazione of Trivignano

- Location within Italy Location within Friuli-Venezia Giulia
- Coordinates: 45°57′N 13°20′E
- Country: Italy
- Region: Friuli-Venezia Giulia
- Province: Udine (UD)

Government
  - Mayor: Roberto Fedele

Area
  - Total: 18.3 km^{2} (7.1 sq mi)
- Elevation: 43 m (141 ft)

Population (30 April 2017)
  - Total: 1,632
  - Density: 89.2/km^{2} (231/sq mi)
- Demonym: Trivignanesi
- Time zone: UTC+1 (CET)
  - Summer (DST): UTC+2 (CEST)
- Postal code: 33050
- Dialing code: 0432
- Website: Official website

Trivignano Udinese (Friulian: Trivignan) is a comune (municipality) in the Regional decentralization entity of Udine in the Italian region of Friuli-Venezia Giulia, located about 50 kilometres (31 mi) northwest of Trieste and about 15 kilometres (9 mi) southeast of Udine. Its frazione (borough) of Clauiano has been described as one of I Borghi più belli d'Italia ("The most beautiful villages of Italy").
