= Farra d'Isonzo =

- Comune
- Comune di Farra d'Isonzo
- Coat of arms

- Location within Italy Location within Friuli-Venezia Giulia
- Coordinates: 45°54′56.5″N 13°31′33.0″E
- Country: Italy
- Region: Friuli-Venezia Giulia
- Province: Gorizia (GO)
- Frazioni: Borgo Grotta, Mainizza, Villanova di Farra, Borgo dei Conventi, Monte Fortin, Borgo del Molino, Fossata

Government
  - Mayor: Stefano Turchetto

Area
  - Total: 10.25 km^{2} (3.96 sq mi)
- Elevation: 46 m (151 ft)

Population (2001)
  - Total: 1,709
  - Density: 166.7/km^{2} (431.8/sq mi)
- Demonym: Farresi
- Time zone: UTC+1 (CET)
  - Summer (DST): UTC+2 (CEST)
- Postal code: 34070
- Dialing code: 0481
- Website: Official website

Farra d'Isonzo (Italian pronunciation: [ˈfarra diˈzontso]; Slovene: Fara ob Soči; Friulian: Fare; Southeastern Friulian: Fara) is a comune (municipality) in the Regional decentralization entity of Gorizia in the Italian region of Friuli-Venezia Giulia.

== History ==
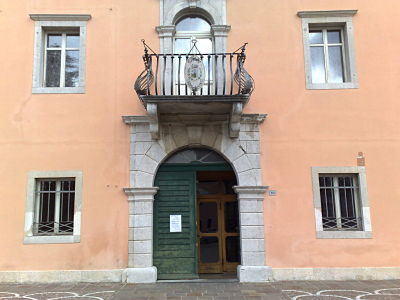
The façade of the Palazzo Municipale in Farra d'Isonzo

The name "Farra" is of Lombard origin, and derives from "Fara", meaning "a stronghold held by individual families or clans". The Romans later had a "statio"—or courier relay point—here, near which they built a bulky bridge on the Isonzo River in a place called Mainizza to improve communications with the eastern territories. It was on this strategic bridge that the Goths, the Ostrogoths, the Lombards, the Avari, the Huns, the Hungarians and the Turks would later pass to invade the empire.

== Economy ==
Today Farra is still a thriving center for the numerous vineyards that cover its vast territory. The old agricultural features of the landscape can still be seen in the urban layout of the locality, that includes numerous villages and the two smaller towns of Mainizza and Villanova.

== Main sights ==
The palace of Calice (1728) stands out next to the modern buildings that were rebuilt after the war. It is the administrative seat of the comune and housed important landowners' villas. An intense and lively cultural life has developed here, and there are numerous institutions like the centre dedicated the poet Riccardo Pitteri, who wrote about this country and chose it as a summer resort. There is also a retirement home, and in Borgo Grotta there is a museum documenting the agricultural society of the region of Friuli.

In Borgo Zuppini stands the 17th-century Church of the Immaculate Conception, built by Count Giovanni Battista Zuppini between 1665 and 1669. It is the oldest church in the archidiocese named after the Immaculate Conception.

=== Observatory ===
The Farra d'Isonzo Observatory (Italian: Osservatorio Astronomico di Farra d'Isonzo, obs.code: 595), where minor planets have been discovered, and a town library are among the other facilities found there.

For several years there has been an established musical academy here, promoting an annual chamber music competition for young musicians of the Alpe-Adria, and various concerts are held in the chamber of the parochial oratory. Among other music is the "Gruppo Vocale", a men's choir of recent origin, but already boasting a significant series of successes with its repertory of classical, popular and religious music.
