= Mariano del Friuli =

Mariano del Friuli Marian (Friulian)
- Comune
- Comune di Mariano del Friuli
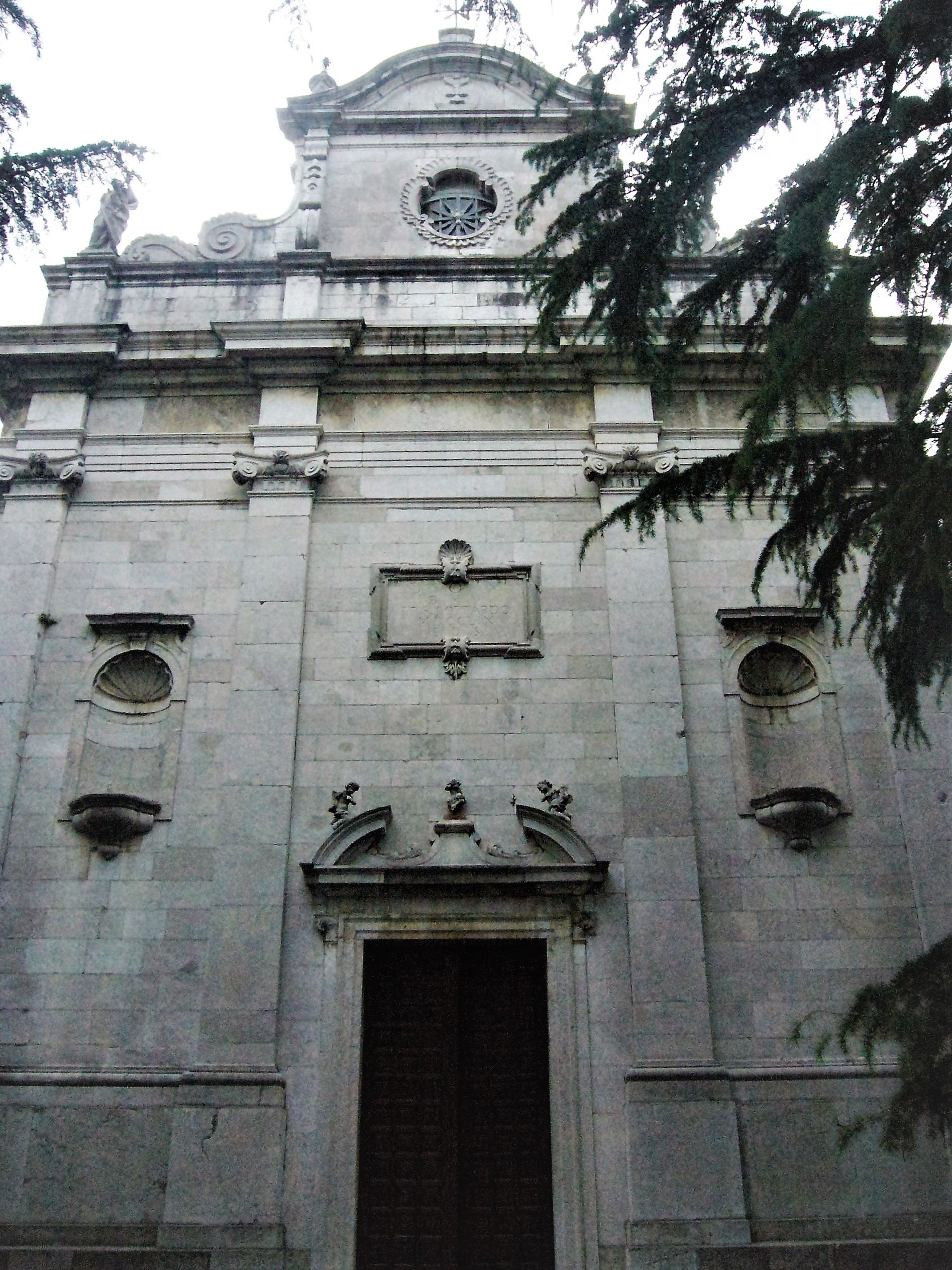
- Church of San Gottardo

- Coat of arms

- Location within Italy Location within Friuli-Venezia Giulia
- Coordinates: 45°55′N 13°28′E
- Country: Italy
- Region: Friuli-Venezia Giulia
- Province: Gorizia (GO)
- Frazioni: Corona

Government
  - Mayor: Cristina Visintin

Area
  - Total: 8 km^{2} (3.1 sq mi)
- Elevation: 32 m (105 ft)

Population (December 31, 2004)
  - Total: 1,538
  - Density: 190/km^{2} (500/sq mi)
- Time zone: UTC+1 (CET)
  - Summer (DST): UTC+2 (CEST)
- Postal code: 34070
- Dialing code: 0481
- Patron saint: San Gottardo
- Saint day: May 5

Mariano del Friuli (Friulian: Marian) is a town and comune (municipality) in the Regional decentralization entity of Gorizia, part of the Friuli-Venezia Giulia region of north-eastern Italy. It is the birthplace of the former Italy national football team goalkeeper Dino Zoff.

As of 2024, the mayor of Mariano del Friuli is Cristina Visintin, who previously served between 2009 and 2019.
