= La Patrie dal Friûl =

Friulian newspaper

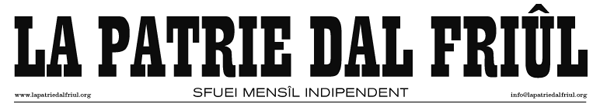
- Type: Monthly newspaper
- Format: Tabloid
- Publisher: Postal delivery and some newsstands
- Editor: Andrea Valcic
- Founded: 1946; 80 years ago
- Political alignment: Autonomism, Independentism
- Language: Friulian
- Headquarters: Gemona del Friuli, Italy

La Patrie dal Friûl (in English The Homeland of Friuli) is a Friulian monthly newspaper published in Gemona del Friuli, Italy. It is one of the few newspapers in Friulian language.
