= Pagnacco =

Pagnacco Pagnà (Friulian)
- Comune
- Comune di Pagnacco / Comun di Pagnà
- Location within Italy Location within Friuli-Venezia Giulia
- Coordinates: 46°7′N 13°11′E
- Country: Italy
- Region: Friuli-Venezia Giulia
- Province: Udine (UD)
- Frazioni: Castellerio, Fontanabona, Lazzacco, Modoletto, Plaino, Zampis

Government
  - Mayor: Laura Sandruvi (civic list)

Area
  - Total: 14.9 km^{2} (5.8 sq mi)

Population (Dec. 2004)
  - Total: 4,824
  - Density: 324/km^{2} (839/sq mi)
- Time zone: UTC+1 (CET)
  - Summer (DST): UTC+2 (CEST)
- Postal code: 33010
- Dialing code: 0432
- Website: Official website

Pagnacco (Friulian: Pagnà) is a comune (municipality) in the Regional decentralization entity of Udine in the Italian region of Friuli-Venezia Giulia, located about 70 kilometres (43 mi) northwest of Trieste and about 7 kilometres (4 mi) northwest of Udine. As of 31 December 2004, it had a population of 4,824 and an area of 14.9 square kilometres (5.8 mi^{2}).

The municipality of Pagnacco contains the frazioni (boroughs) Castellerio, Fontanabona, Lazzacco, Modoletto, Plaino, and Zampis.

Pagnacco borders the following municipalities: Colloredo di Monte Albano, Martignacco, Moruzzo, Tavagnacco, Tricesimo.

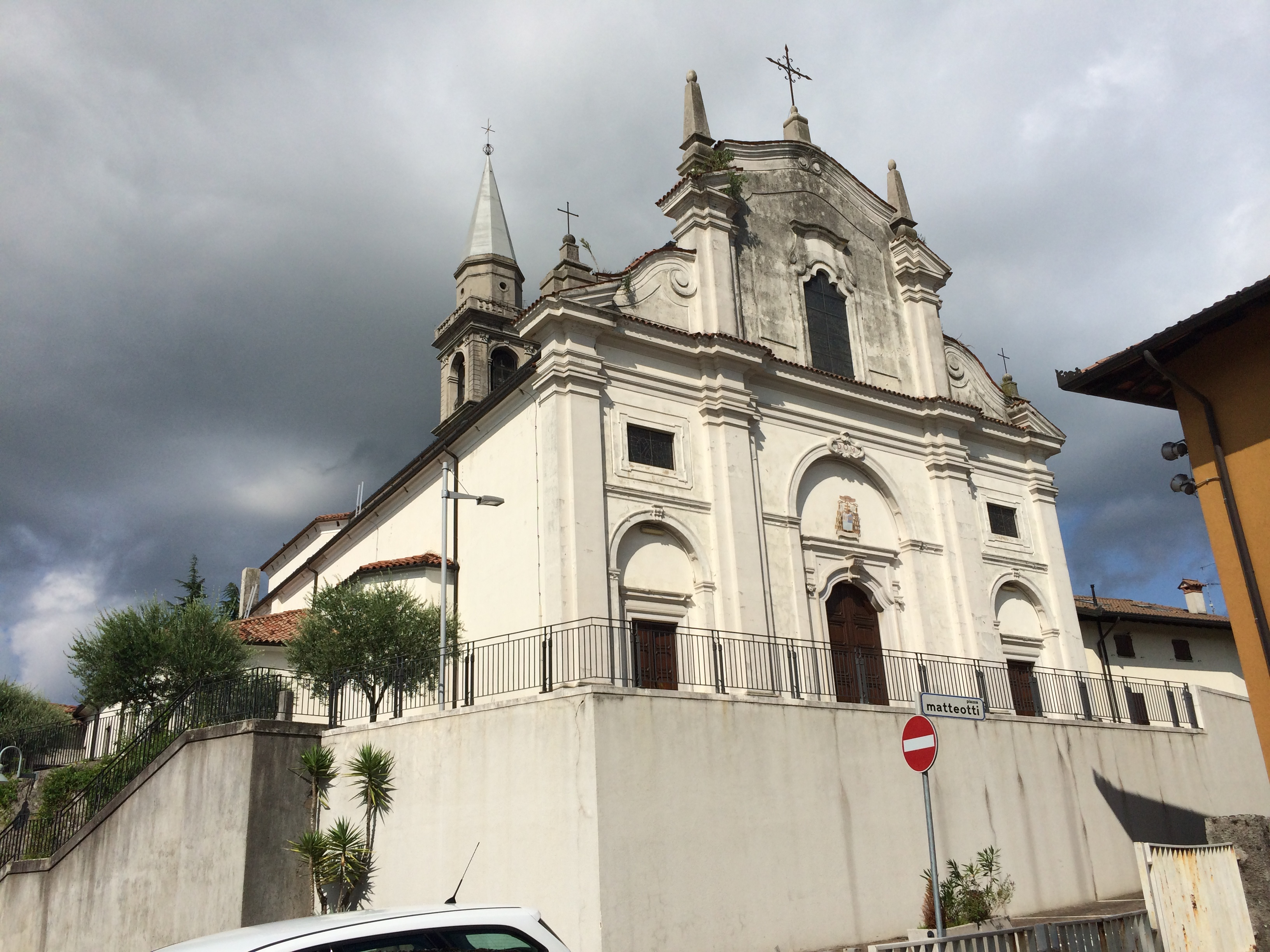
San Giorgio church

== Demographic evolution ==
Historical population

Year	Pop.	±%
1861	?	—
1871	1,879	—
1881	2,065	+9.9%
1901	2,350	+13.8%
1911	3,008	+28.0%

Year	Pop.	±%
1921	3,286	+9.2%
1931	3,006	−8.5%
1936	2,843	−5.4%
1951	3,183	+12.0%
1961	2,907	−8.7%

Year	Pop.	±%
1971	3,019	+3.9%
1981	3,744	+24.0%
1991	4,255	+13.6%
2001	4,606	+8.2%

Source: Data from ISTAT

== Twin towns ==
Pagnacco is twinned with:

- Celldömölk, Hungary
