= Buja =

Buja Buie (Friulian)
- Comune
- Comune di Buja
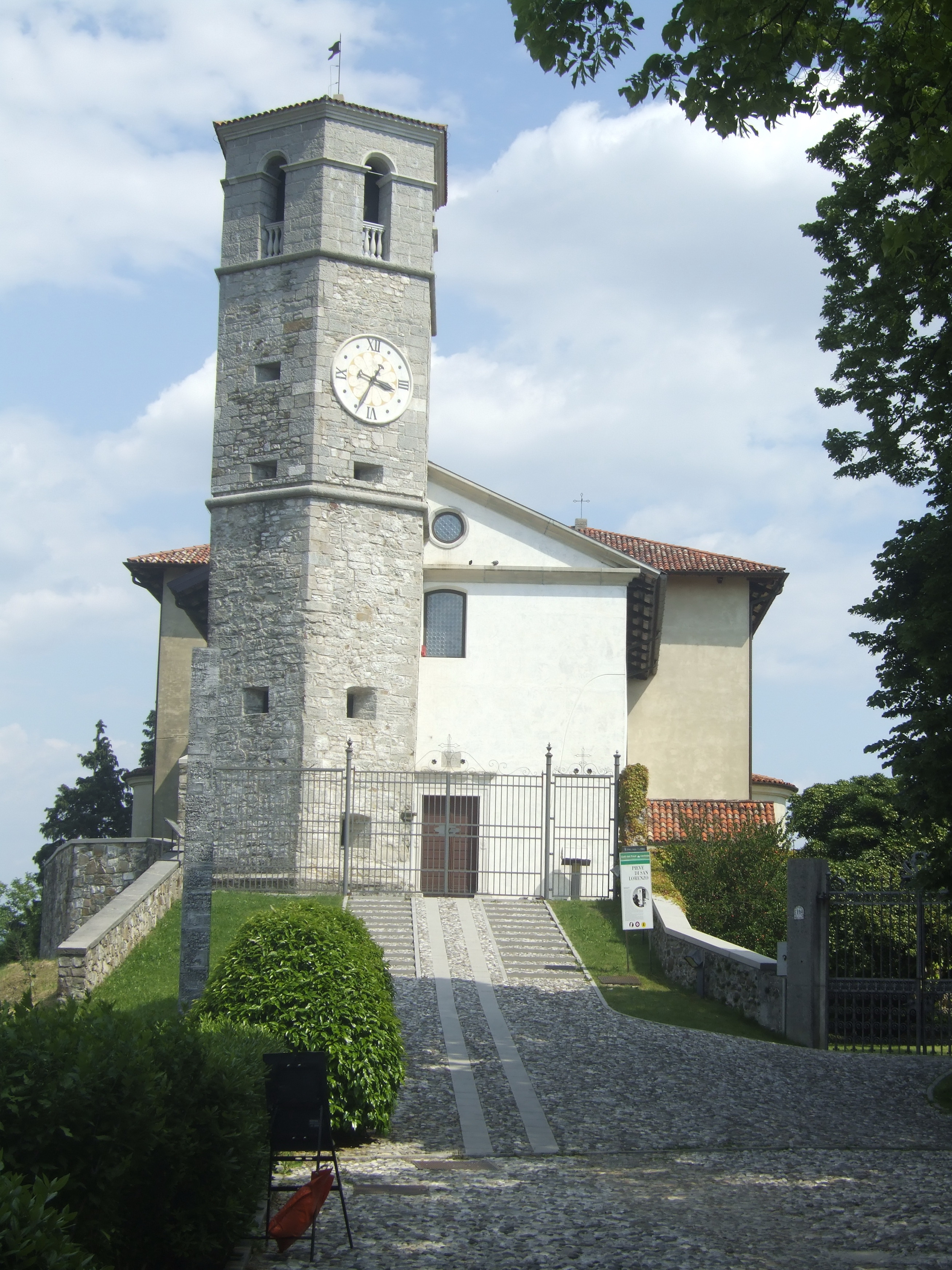
- The ancient archpriestal parish church of San Lorenzo

- Location of the municipality of Buja in the former province of Udine

- Location within Italy Location within Friuli-Venezia Giulia
- Coordinates: 46°13′N 13°8′E
- Country: Italy
- Region: Friuli-Venezia Giulia
- Province: Udine (UD)
- Frazioni: Avilla, San Floreano, Sopramonte, Solaris, Madonna, Urbignacco, Santo Stefano, Collosomano, Sottocostoia, Ursinins Grande, Ursinins Piccolo, Monte, Arba, Caspigello, Campo Garzolino, Saletti, Tomba, Sala, Sottocolle, Ca' Martino

Government
  - Mayor: Silvia Maria Pezzetta

Area
  - Total: 27.9 km^{2} (10.8 sq mi)
- Elevation: 215 m (705 ft)

Population (30 November 2025)
  - Total: 6,338
  - Density: 227/km^{2} (588/sq mi)
- Demonym: Buiesi
- Time zone: UTC+1 (CET)
  - Summer (DST): UTC+2 (CEST)
- Postal code: 33030
- Dialing code: 0432
- Patron saint: Saints Ermacora and Fortunato
- Saint day: 12 July
- Website: Official website

Buja (Friulian: Buje or Buie) is a comune (municipality) in the Regional decentralization entity of Udine in the Italian region of Friuli-Venezia Giulia, located about 80 kilometres (50 mi) northwest of Trieste and about 20 kilometres (12 mi) northwest of Udine.

Buja borders the following municipalities: Artegna, Colloredo di Monte Albano, Gemona del Friuli, Majano, Osoppo, Treppo Grande.

== History ==
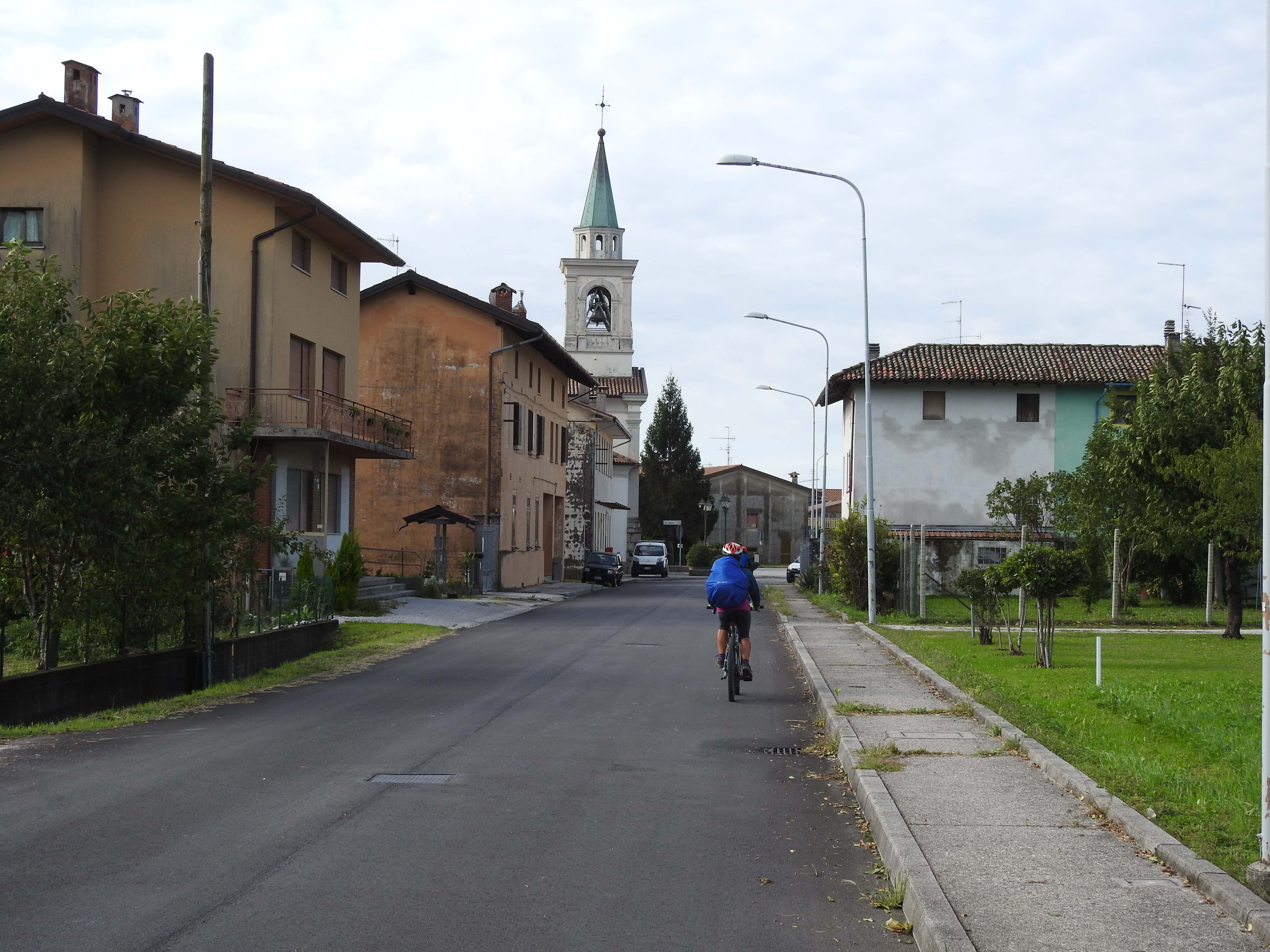
Via Tomba in 2017

According to a 12th-century copy of a document dated August 4th, 792, Buja (Boga) was donated to Patriarch Paulinus II of Aquileia by Charlemagne. In 1371, Patriarch Marquard of Randeck granted Buia its own communal status, establishing a Council of Twenty-Four which annually elected a mayor from its membership.

=== Symbols ===
The coat of arms and the banner were recognized by decree of the Prime Minister on May 16, 1929.

"Azure, an ox passant, au naturel, on three necks vert, holding in its dexter paw a purplish pennant, charged with a cross argent. The shield shall be adorned with the crown of the Municipality." The banner is a purple cloth.

== Monuments and places of interest ==
- St. Stephen's Cathedral: The ordinary church of Santo Stefano arose in the 13th century; in the 16th century this building was demolished and replaced by a larger one, which was then remodelled two centuries later.
- Parish Church of San Lorenzo Martire: the parish church stands atop the highest of Buja's seven hills. In 1980, during restoration and renovation work following the 1976 earthquake, traces of an ancient early Christian basilica, typical of the 5th-century Aquileian area, were discovered.
- Church of the Blessed Virgin ad Melotum in Madonna: rebuilt after the 1976 earthquake based on a design by architect Tondolo di Buja. Inside is the famous wooden statue of the Madonna and Child, created by sculptor Domenico da Tolmezzo in 1481.

=== Civil architecture ===
- Municipal Library "6 of Mai from '76"
- Youth House "Casa della gioventù"
- Museum of Medal Art and the Municipality of Buja: the facility aims to represent the region through archaeological evidence and historical-artistic works.

== Society ==
=== Demographic evolution ===
Historical population

Year	Pop.	±%
1861	?	—
1871	5,606	—
1881	6,184	+10.3%
1901	8,581	+38.8%
1911	10,415	+21.4%
1921	11,373	+9.2%

Year	Pop.	±%
1931	9,320	−18.1%
1936	7,826	−16.0%
1951	8,254	+5.5%
1961	7,383	−10.6%
1971	6,436	−12.8%
1981	6,568	+2.1%

Year	Pop.	±%
1991	6,608	+0.6%
2001	6,674	+1.0%
2011	6,627	−0.7%
2021	6,637	+0.2%

Source: Data from ISTAT

=== Languages and Dialects ===
In Buja, alongside Italian, the population uses the Friulian language. Pursuant to Resolution No. 2680 of August 3, 2001, of the Regional Council of the Autonomous Region of Friuli-Venezia Giulia, the municipality is included in the territorial protection of the Friulian language for the purposes of the application of Law 482/99, Regional Law 15/96, and Regional Law 29/2007.

== Administration ==
=== Mayors since 1995 ===
Period		Mayor	Party	Role	Note
1994	1998	Aldo Calligaro	Lega Nord.	Mayor	
1998	2002	Aldo Calligaro	Lega Nord.	Mayor	
2002	2007	Luca Marcuzzo	Center-right	Mayor	
2007	2012	Mario Pezzetta	Center-right	Mayor	
2012	2017	Stefano Bergagna	Lega Nord.	Mayor	
2017	2022	Stefano Bergagna	Lega per Salvini Premier	Mayor	
2022	in carica	Silvia Maria Pezzetta	Coalition FdI, Lega per Salvini Premier	Mayor	

== Twin towns ==
Buja is twinned with:

- Aprilia, Italy, since 1997
- Vilsbiburg, Germany, since 2001
- Domont, France, since 2008

== Sports ==
The A.S.D. Bujese Calcio soccer club, which has competed in regional amateur championships, is based in the town. Numerous other sports associations and clubs are also present. Of particular note are the two cycling clubs, Ciclistica Bujese and Jam's Bike, which have produced and continue to produce top athletes, both male and female, including Asia Zontone, Alessandro De Marchi and Jonathan Milan.
