= Artegna =

Artegna Dartigne (Friulian)
- Comune
- Comune di Artegna
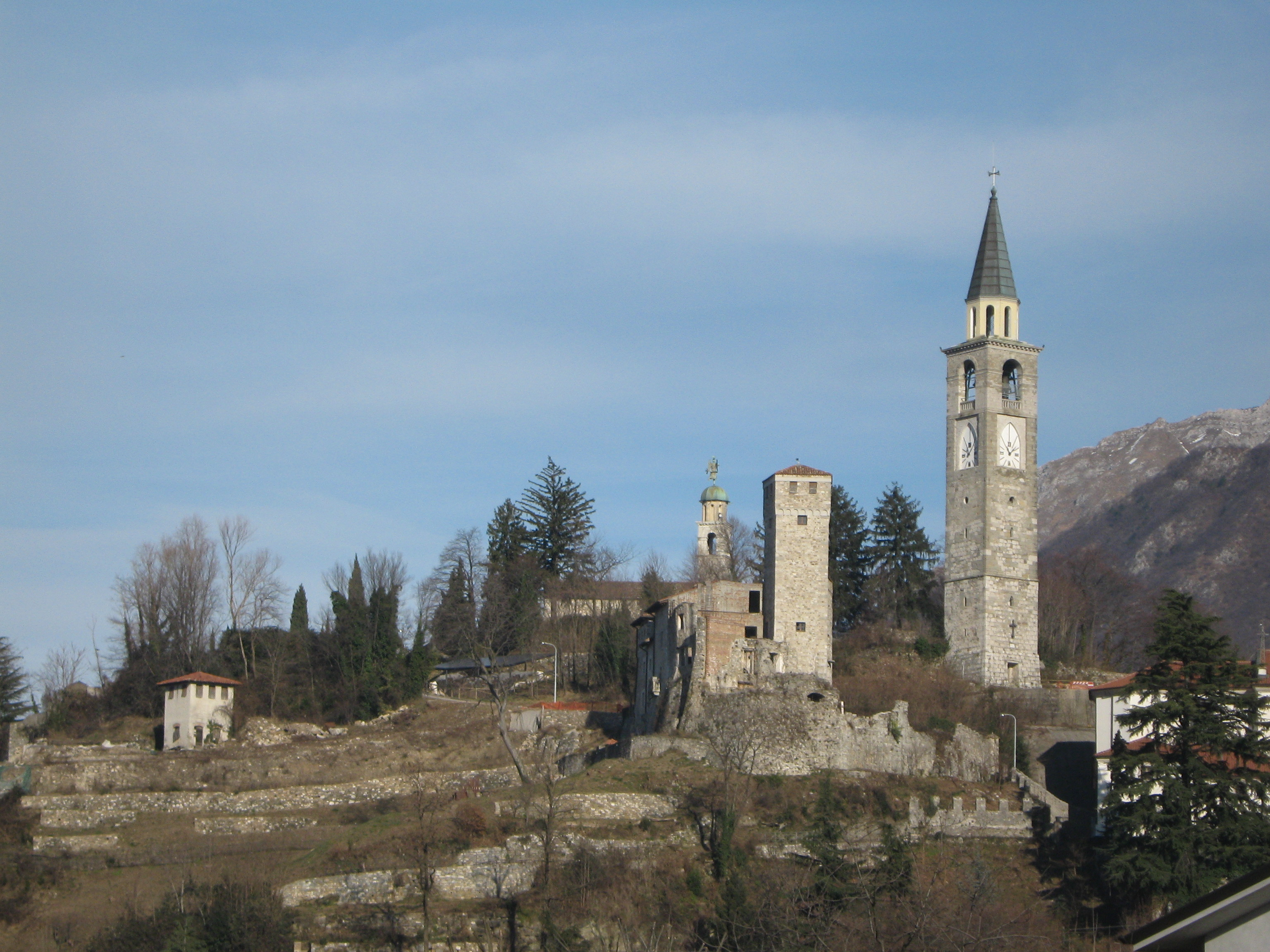

- Location of Artegna in Italy Artegna (Friuli-Venezia Giulia)
- Coordinates: 46°14′N 13°9′E
- Country: Italy
- Region: Friuli-Venezia Giulia
- Province: Udine (UD)

Government
  - Mayor: Alessandro Marangoni (Civic list)

Area
  - Total: 11.2 km^{2} (4.3 sq mi)
- Elevation: 210 m (690 ft)

Population (2008)264
  - Total: 2,951
  - Density: 263/km^{2} (682/sq mi)
- Demonym: Arteniesi
- Time zone: UTC+1 (CET)
  - Summer (DST): UTC+2 (CEST)
- Postal code: 33011
- Dialing code: 0432
- Website: Official website

Artegna (Friulian: Dartigne; German: Ardingen) is a comune (municipality) in the Regional decentralization entity of Udine in the Italian region of Friuli-Venezia Giulia, located about 80 kilometres (50 mi) northwest of Trieste and about 20 kilometres (12 mi) northwest of Udine. As of 2008, it had a population of 2,951 and an area of 11.2 square kilometres (4.3 mi^{2}).

Artegna borders the following municipalities: Buja, Gemona del Friuli, Magnano in Riviera, Treppo Grande and Montenars.

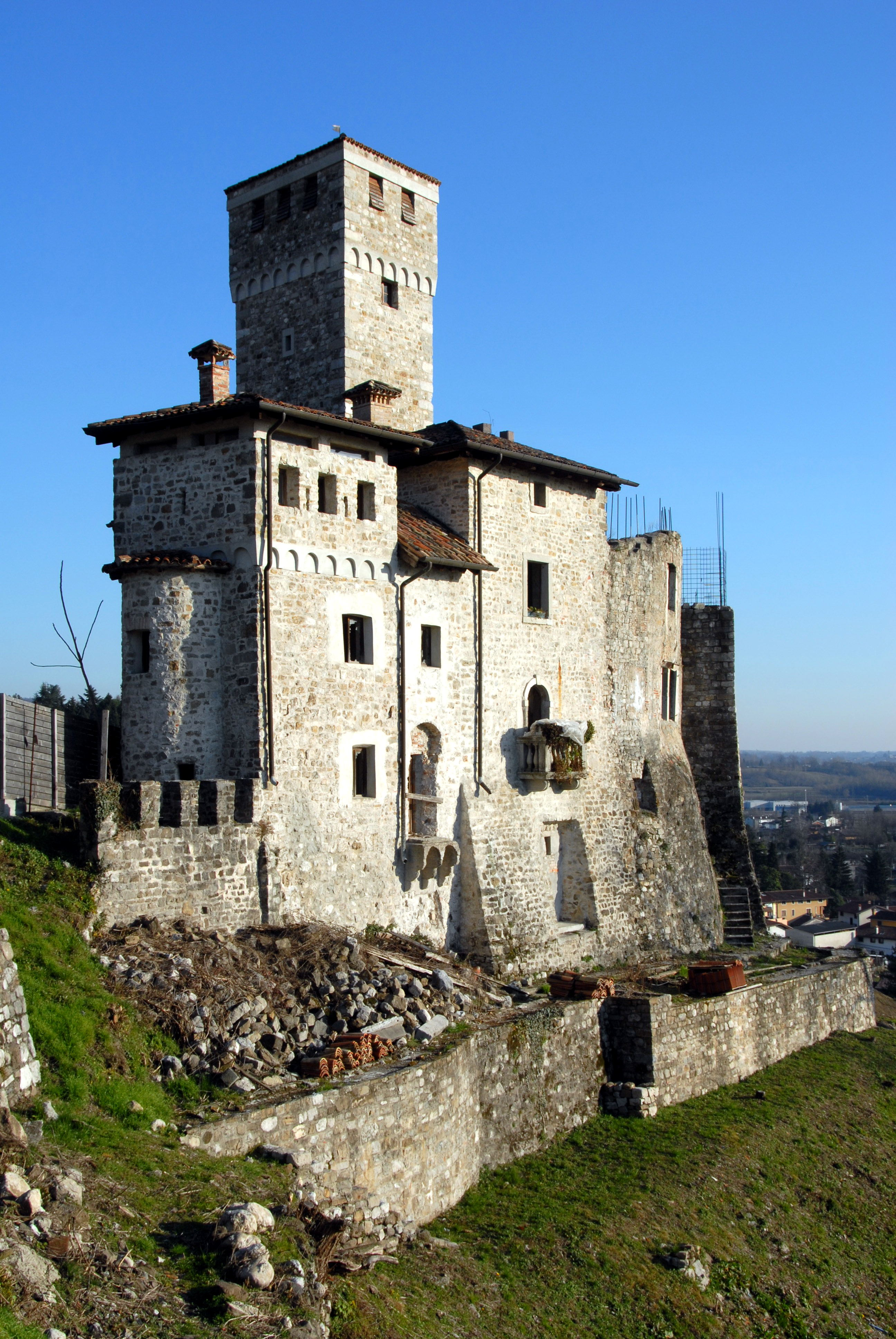
Castle in Artegna

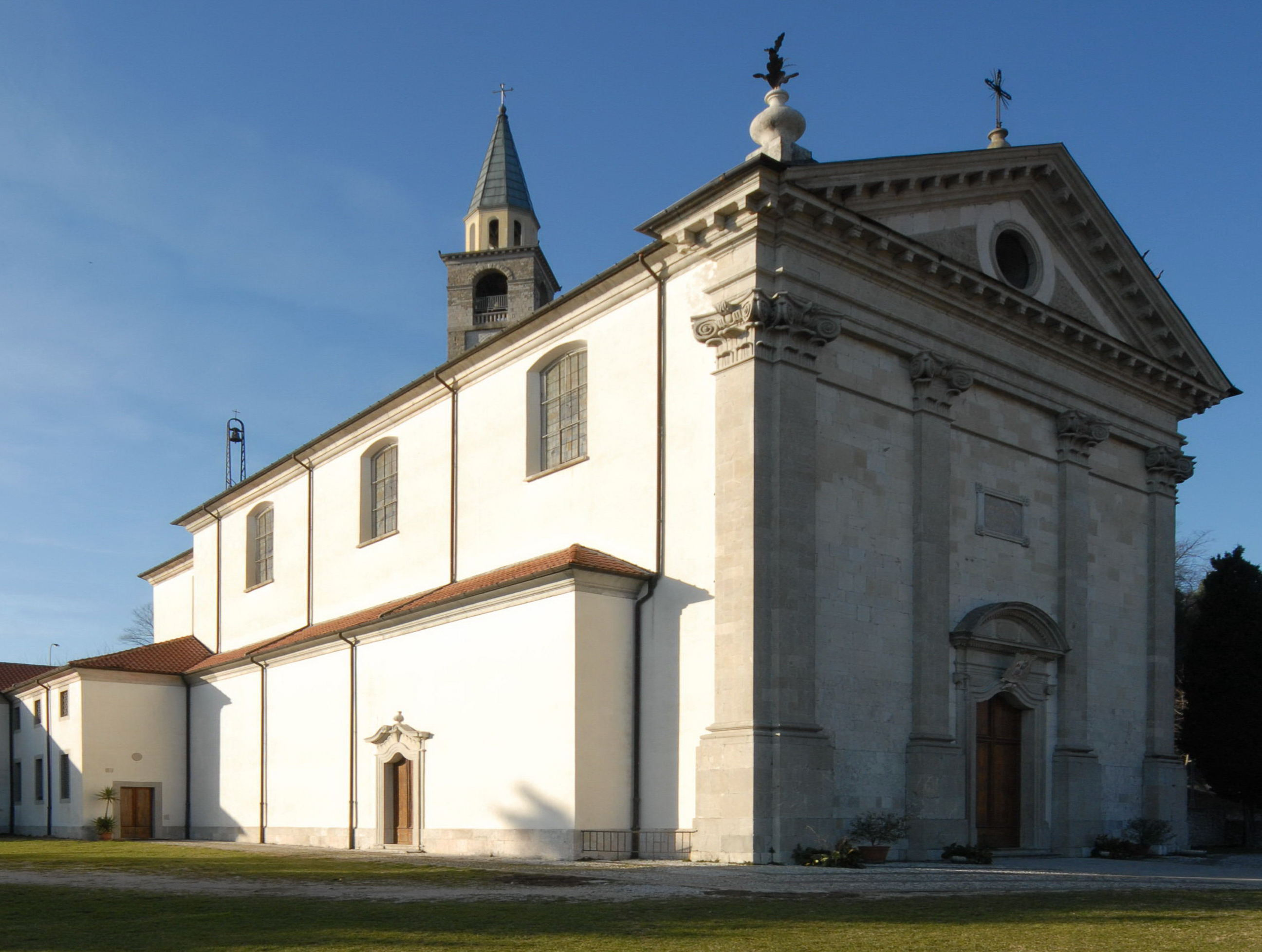
Cathedral of Artegna

== Demographic evolution ==
Historical population

Year	Pop.	±%
1861	?	—
1871	3,201	—
1881	3,244	+1.3%
1901	3,806	+17.3%
1911	4,271	+12.2%

Year	Pop.	±%
1921	4,551	+6.6%
1931	3,927	−13.7%
1936	3,481	−11.4%
1951	4,044	+16.2%
1961	3,701	−8.5%

Year	Pop.	±%
1971	2,909	−21.4%
1981	2,739	−5.8%
1991	2,839	+3.7%
2001	2,904	+2.3%

Source: Data from ISTAT
