= Cassacco =

Cassacco Cjassà (Friulian)
- Comune
- Comune di Cassacco / Comun di Cjassà
- Location within Italy Location within Friuli-Venezia Giulia
- Coordinates: 46°10′N 13°11′E
- Country: Italy
- Region: Friuli-Venezia Giulia
- Province: Udine (UD)
- Frazioni: Conoglano, Martinazzo, Raspano, Montegnacco

Area
  - Total: 11.6 km^{2} (4.5 sq mi)

Population (Dec. 2004)
  - Total: 2,880
  - Density: 248/km^{2} (643/sq mi)
- Demonym: Cassaccesi
- Time zone: UTC+1 (CET)
  - Summer (DST): UTC+2 (CEST)
- Postal code: 33010
- Dialing code: 0432
- Website: Official website

Cassacco (Friulian: Cjassà) is a comune (municipality) in the Regional decentralization entity of Udine in the Italian region of Friuli-Venezia Giulia, located about 80 kilometres (50 mi) northwest of Trieste and about 12 kilometres (7 mi) northwest of Udine. As of 31 December 2004, it had a population of 2,880 and an area of 11.6 square kilometres (4.5 mi^{2}).

The municipality of Cassacco contains the frazioni (boroughs) Conoglano, Martinazzo, Raspano, and Montegnacco.

Cassacco borders the following municipalities: Colloredo di Monte Albano, Magnano in Riviera, Tarcento, Treppo Grande, Tricesimo.

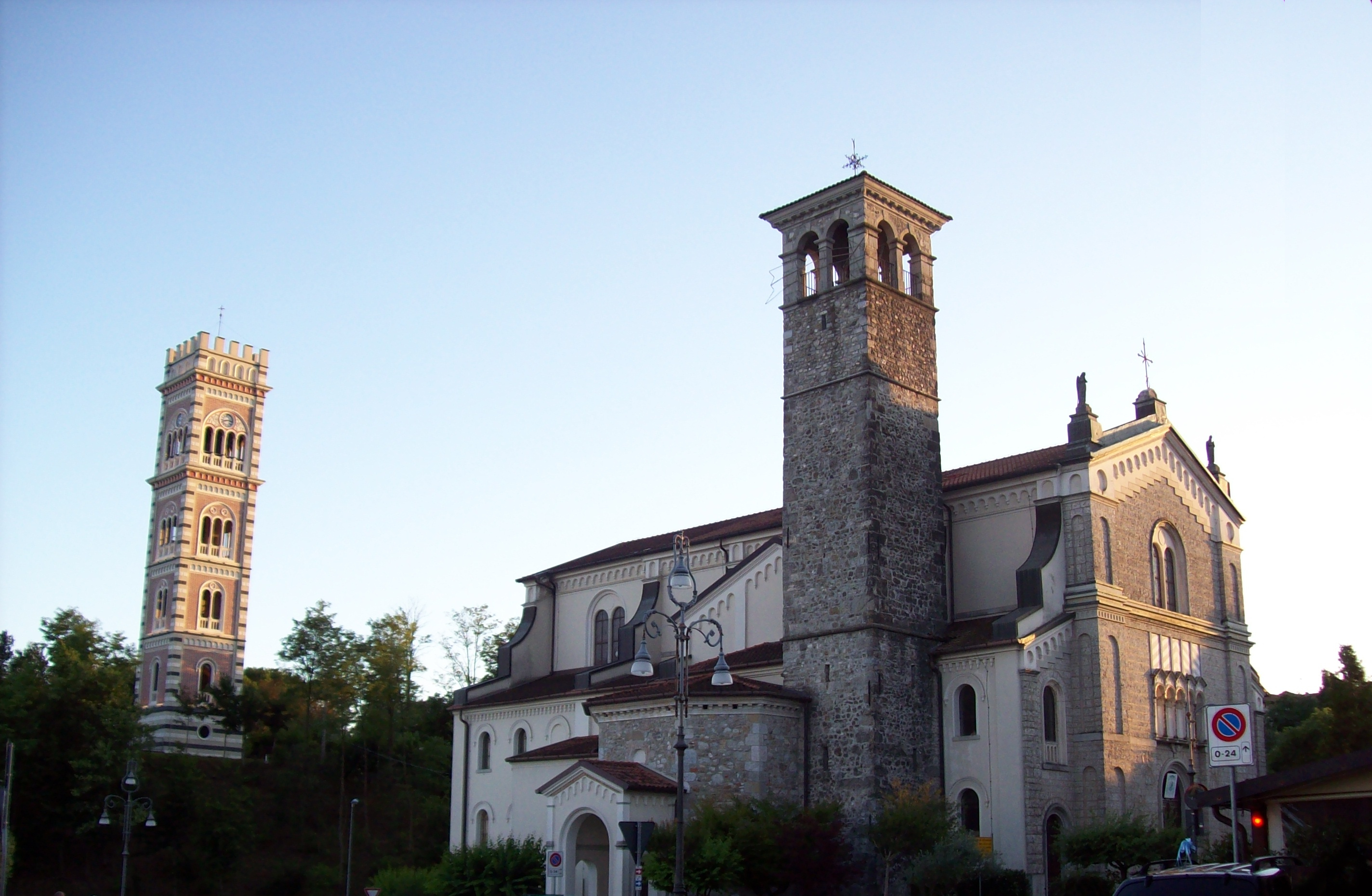
San Giovanni Church

== Demographic evolution ==
Historical population

Year	Pop.	±%
1861	?	—
1871	1,911	—
1881	2,016	+5.5%
1901	2,770	+37.4%
1911	3,330	+20.2%

Year	Pop.	±%
1921	3,560	+6.9%
1931	3,069	−13.8%
1936	2,476	−19.3%
1951	2,960	+19.5%
1961	2,684	−9.3%

Year	Pop.	±%
1971	2,334	−13.0%
1981	2,829	+21.2%
1991	2,859	+1.1%
2001	2,849	−0.3%

Source: Data from ISTAT

== Twin towns ==
Cassacco is twinned with:

- Glanegg, Austria, since 1997
