= Montenars =

Montenars Gorjani (Slovene)
- Comune
- Comune di Montenars
- Location within Italy Location within Friuli-Venezia Giulia
- Coordinates: 46°15′N 13°11′E
- Country: Italy
- Region: Friuli-Venezia Giulia
- Province: Udine (UD)

Area
  - Total: 20.6 km^{2} (8.0 sq mi)

Population (Jan. 2018)
  - Total: 554
  - Density: 26.9/km^{2} (69.7/sq mi)
- Time zone: UTC+1 (CET)
  - Summer (DST): UTC+2 (CEST)
- Postal code: 33010
- Dialing code: 0432

Montenars (Slovene: Gorjani) is a comune (municipality) in the Regional decentralization entity of Udine in the Italian region of Friuli-Venezia Giulia, located about 80 kilometres (50 mi) northwest of Trieste and about 20 kilometres (12 mi) north of Udine. As of 31 December 2004, it had a population of 554 and an area of 20.6 square kilometres (8.0 mi^{2}).

Montenars borders the following municipalities: Artegna, Gemona del Friuli, Lusevera, Magnano in Riviera, Tarcento.

== Demographic evolution ==
Historical population

Year	Pop.	±%
1861	?	—
1871	1,591	—
1881	1,676	+5.3%
1901	1,882	+12.3%
1911	1,844	−2.0%

Year	Pop.	±%
1921	2,047	+11.0%
1931	1,585	−22.6%
1936	1,323	−16.5%
1951	1,316	−0.5%
1961	1,065	−19.1%

Year	Pop.	±%
1971	741	−30.4%
1981	672	−9.3%
1991	607	−9.7%
2001	536	−11.7%

Source: Data from ISTAT

== Twin towns ==
Montenars is twinned with:

- Arezzo, Italy, since 1977
