= Alessandro Cicutti =

Italian football goalkeeper (born 1987)

Personal information
- Date of birth: 26 May 1987 (age 39)
- Place of birth: Gemona del Friuli, Italy
- Position: Goalkeeper

Senior career*
| Years | Team | Apps | (Gls) |
| 2005–2006 | Arzachena | 12 | (-12) |
| 2006 | Palazzolo | 7 | (-8) |
| 2006–2007 | Paternò | 33 | (-44) |
| 2007–2008 | Imperia | 13 | (-8) |
| 2008 | Biellese | 7 | (-3) |
| 2008–2011 | Alessandria | 5 | (-5) |
| 2011 | Savona | 0 | (0) |
| 2011–2012 | Vicenza | 0 | (0) |
- * Club domestic league appearances and goals as of 26 September 2012

Alessandro Cicutti (born 26 May 1987) is an Italian football goalkeeper.

He signed in 2011–2012 season for Vicenza.

== Caps on football series ==
Lega Pro Prima Divisione : 4 (-3)

Serie D : 72 (-75)

Total : 76 (-78)

== See also ==
- Football in Italy
- List of football clubs in Italy
