= Tricesimo =

Tricesimo Tresesin (Friulian)
- Comune
- Comune di Tricesimo
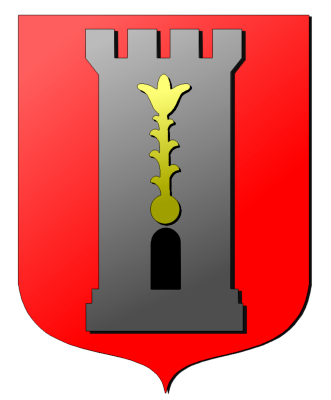
- Coat of arms

- Location within Italy Location within Friuli-Venezia Giulia
- Coordinates: 46°9′N 13°13′E
- Country: Italy
- Region: Friuli-Venezia Giulia
- Province: Udine (UD)
- Frazioni: Ara Grande, Ara Piccola, Felettano, Fraelacco, Leonacco, Braidamatta, Colgallo, Adorgnano

Area
  - Total: 17.5 km^{2} (6.8 sq mi)
- Elevation: 199 m (653 ft)

Population (Dec. 2004)
  - Total: 7,471
  - Density: 427/km^{2} (1,110/sq mi)
- Time zone: UTC+1 (CET)
  - Summer (DST): UTC+2 (CEST)
- Postal code: 33019
- Dialing code: 0432
- Website: Official website

Tricesimo (Friulian: Tresesin) is a comune (municipality) in the Regional decentralization entity of Udine in the Italian region of Friuli-Venezia Giulia, located about 70 kilometres (43 mi) northwest of Trieste and about 9 kilometres (6 mi) north of Udine. As of 31 December 2004, it had a population of 7,471 and an area of 17.5 square kilometres (6.8 mi^{2}).

The municipality of Tricesimo contains the frazioni (boroughs) Ara Grande, Ara Piccola, Felettano, Fraelacco, Leonacco, Braidamatta, Colgallo, and Adorgnano.

Tricesimo borders the following municipalities: Cassacco, Pagnacco, Reana del Rojale, Tarcento, Tavagnacco, Treppo Grande, Fagagna.

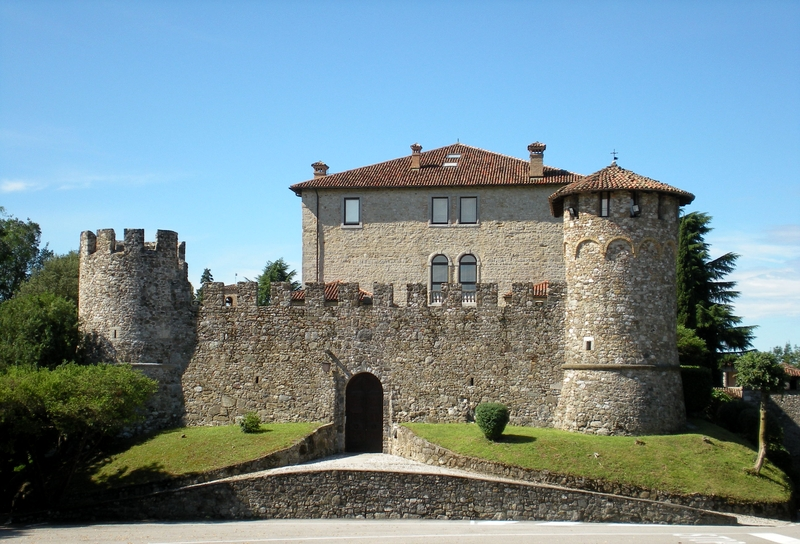
the Castle

== Demographic evolution ==
Historical population

Year	Pop.	±%
1861	?	—
1871	3,760	—
1881	3,976	+5.7%
1901	4,849	+22.0%
1911	5,564	+14.7%

Year	Pop.	±%
1921	6,271	+12.7%
1931	5,630	−10.2%
1936	5,040	−10.5%
1951	6,104	+21.1%
1961	5,743	−5.9%

Year	Pop.	±%
1971	5,975	+4.0%
1981	6,584	+10.2%
1991	6,861	+4.2%
2001	7,305	+6.5%

Source: Data from ISTAT

== Twin towns ==
Tricesimo is twinned with:

- Mittersill, Austria
