= Bordano =

Bordano Bordan (Friulian)
- Comune
- Comune di Bordano
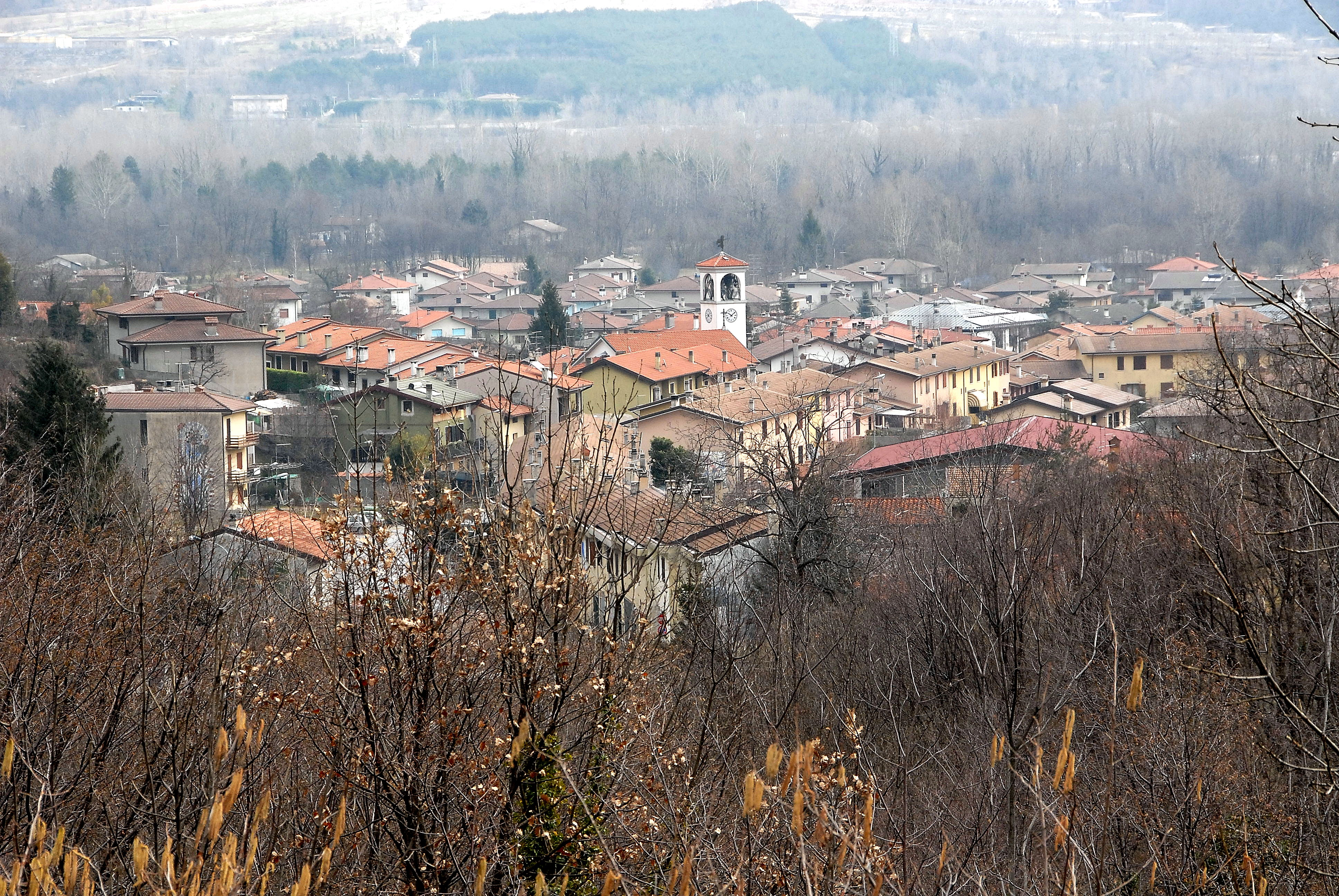

- Coat of arms

- Location within Italy Location within Friuli-Venezia Giulia
- Coordinates: 46°19′N 13°6′E
- Country: Italy
- Region: Friuli-Venezia Giulia
- Province: Udine (UD)
- Frazioni: Interneppo

Government
  - Mayor: Ivana Bellina

Area
  - Total: 15.2 km^{2} (5.9 sq mi)
- Elevation: 224 m (735 ft)

Population (28 February 2017)
  - Total: 744
  - Density: 48.9/km^{2} (127/sq mi)
- Demonym: Bordanesi
- Time zone: UTC+1 (CET)
  - Summer (DST): UTC+2 (CEST)
- Postal code: 33010
- Dialing code: 0432
- Website: Official website

Bordano (Friulian: Bordan) is a comune (municipality) in the Regional decentralization entity of Udine in the Italian region of Friuli-Venezia Giulia, located about 90 kilometres (56 mi) northwest of Trieste and about 30 kilometres (19 mi) northwest of Udine, on the right bank of the Tagliamento river.

Bordano borders the following municipalities: Cavazzo Carnico, Gemona del Friuli, Trasaghis, Venzone. It is known among locals for the beautiful display of butterflies it shows on its fields.
