= Treppo Grande =

Treppo Grande Trep Grant (Friulian)
- Comune
- Comune di Treppo Grande
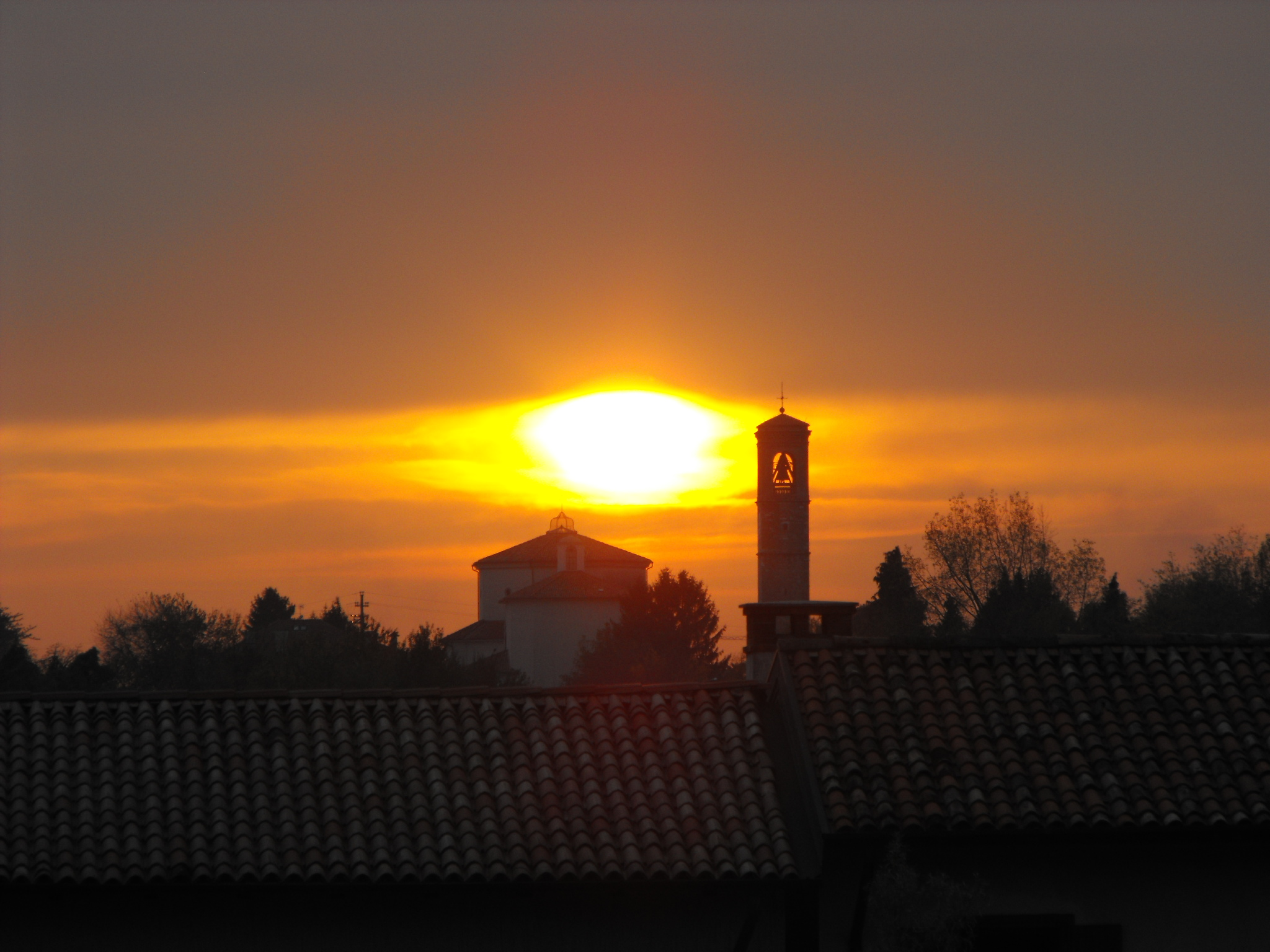

- Location within Italy Location within Friuli-Venezia Giulia
- Coordinates: 46°12′N 13°9′E
- Country: Italy
- Region: Friuli-Venezia Giulia
- Province: Udine (UD)

Government
  - Mayor: Manuela Celotti

Area
  - Total: 11.3 km^{2} (4.4 sq mi)
- Elevation: 231 m (758 ft)

Population (Dec. 2004)
  - Total: 1,781
  - Density: 158/km^{2} (408/sq mi)
- Demonym: Treppesi
- Time zone: UTC+1 (CET)
  - Summer (DST): UTC+2 (CEST)
- Postal code: 33010
- Dialing code: 0432
- Website: Official website

Treppo Grande (Friulian: Trep Grant) is a comune (municipality) in the Regional decentralization entity of Udine in the Italian region of Friuli-Venezia Giulia, located about 80 kilometres (50 mi) northwest of Trieste and about 15 kilometres (9 mi) northwest of Udine.

Treppo Grande borders the following municipalities: Buja, Cassacco, Colloredo di Monte Albano, Magnano in Riviera, Tricesimo.
