= Tavagnacco =

Tavagnacco Tavagnà (Friulian)
- Comune
- Comune di Tavagnacco
- Coat of arms

- Location within Italy Location within Friuli-Venezia Giulia
- Coordinates: 46°8′N 13°13′E
- Country: Italy
- Region: Friuli-Venezia Giulia
- Province: Udine (UD)
- Frazioni: Adegliacco con Santa Fosca, Branco, Cavalicco, Colugna, Feletto Umberto (municipal seat), Molin Nuovo, Tavagnacco

Government
  - Mayor: Mario Pezzetta

Area
  - Total: 15.4 km^{2} (5.9 sq mi)
- Elevation: 137 m (449 ft)

Population (31 December 2010)
  - Total: 14,447
  - Density: 938/km^{2} (2,430/sq mi)
- Demonym: Tavagnacchesi
- Time zone: UTC+1 (CET)
  - Summer (DST): UTC+2 (CEST)
- Postal code: 33010
- Dialing code: 0432
- Website: Official website

Tavagnacco (Friulian: Tavagnà) is a comune (municipality) in the Regional decentralization entity of Udine in the Italian region of Friuli-Venezia Giulia, located about 70 kilometres (43 mi) northwest of Trieste and about 8 kilometres (5 mi) north of Udine. The municipal seat is in the frazione (borough) of Feletto Umberto.

Tavagnacco borders the following municipalities: Martignacco, Pagnacco, Pasian di Prato, Reana del Rojale, Tricesimo and Udine (whose metropolitan area it belongs to).
