= Madonna and Child (Cima, Gemona del Friuli) =

Painting by Cima da Conegliano

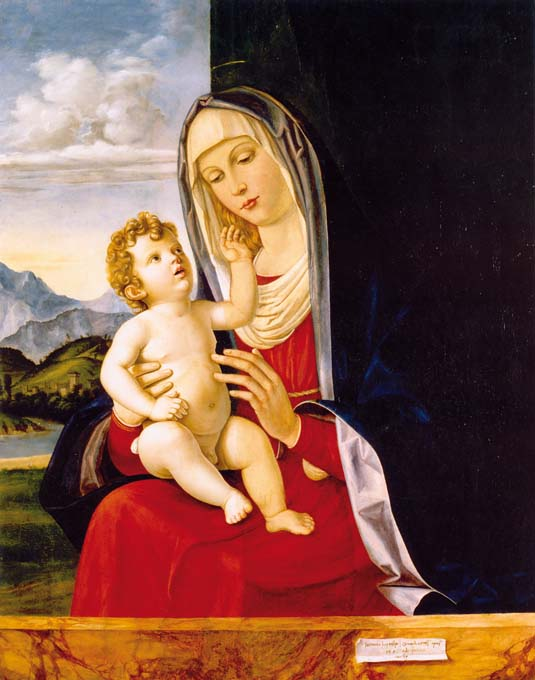
Madonna and Child (1496) by Cima da Conegliano

Madonna and Child is a 1496 oil on panel painting by Cima da Conegliano, now in the Museo Civico in Gemona del Friuli.
