= Magnano in Riviera =

Magnano in Riviera Magnan (Friulian)
- Comune
- Comune di Magnano in Riviera
- Location within Italy Location within Friuli-Venezia Giulia
- Coordinates: 46°14′N 13°10′E
- Country: Italy
- Region: Friuli-Venezia Giulia
- Province: Udine (UD)

Area
  - Total: 8.5 km^{2} (3.3 sq mi)

Population (Dec. 2004)
  - Total: 2,322
  - Density: 270/km^{2} (710/sq mi)
- Time zone: UTC+1 (CET)
  - Summer (DST): UTC+2 (CEST)
- Postal code: 33010
- Dialing code: 0432

Magnano in Riviera (Friulian: Magnan) is a comune (municipality) in the Regional decentralization entity of Udine in the Italian region of Friuli-Venezia Giulia, located about 80 km (50 mi) northwest of Trieste and about 20 km (12 mi) northwest of Udine. As of 31 December 2018, it had a population of 2,333 and an area of 8.5 km^{2} (3.3 sq mi).

Magnano in Riviera borders the following municipalities: Artegna, Cassacco, Montenars, Tarcento, Treppo Grande.

== Demographic evolution ==
Historical population

Year	Pop.	±%
1861	?	—
1871	1,907	—
1881	2,154	+13.0%
1901	2,573	+19.5%
1911	2,925	+13.7%

Year	Pop.	±%
1921	3,174	+8.5%
1931	2,867	−9.7%
1936	2,213	−22.8%
1951	2,626	+18.7%
1961	2,473	−5.8%

Year	Pop.	±%
1971	2,078	−16.0%
1981	2,214	+6.5%
1991	2,239	+1.1%
2001	2,288	+2.2%

Source: Data from ISTAT
