= Gemona del Friuli =

Gemona del Friuli Glemone (Friulian) Humin (Slovene)
- Comune
- Città di Gemona del Friuli
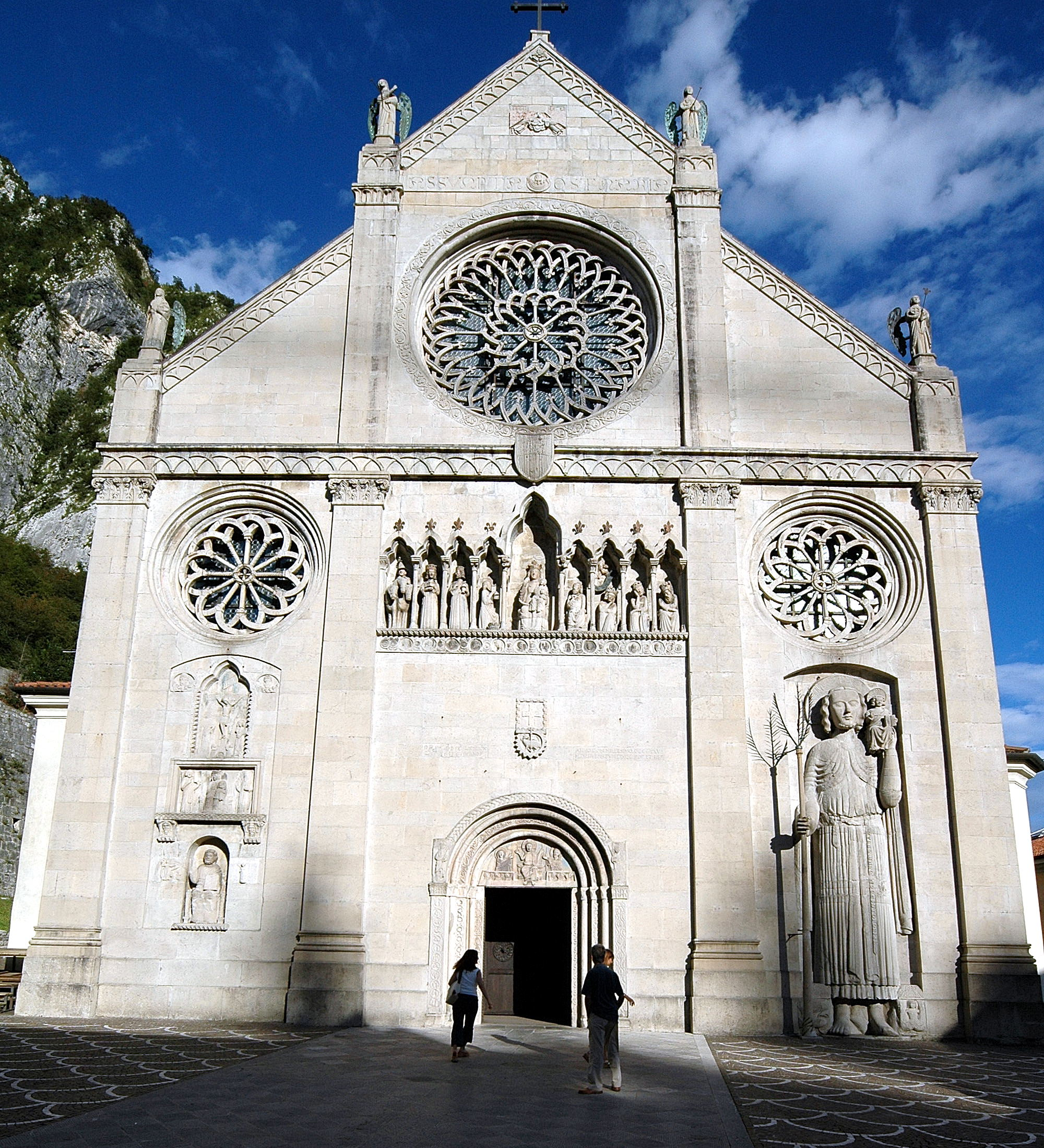
- Cathedral of Gemona

- Coat of arms

- Location of Gemona del Friuli in Italy Gemona del Friuli (Friuli-Venezia Giulia)
- Coordinates: 46°17′N 13°8′E
- Country: Italy
- Region: Friuli-Venezia Giulia
- Province: Udine (UD)
- Frazioni: Piovega, Campagnola, Campolessi, Maniaglia, Ospedaletto, Godo, Centro Storico, Stalis, Taviele, Taboga

Government
  - Mayor: Roberto Revelant

Area
  - Total: 56.2 km^{2} (21.7 sq mi)
- Elevation: 272 m (892 ft)

Population (31 January 2026)
  - Total: 10,405
  - Density: 185/km^{2} (480/sq mi)
- Demonym: Gemonesi
- Time zone: UTC+1 (CET)
  - Summer (DST): UTC+2 (CEST)
- Postal code: 33013
- Dialing code: 0432
- ISTAT code: 030043
- Patron saint: Saint Anthony
- Saint day: June 13
- Website: Official website

Gemona del Friuli (Friulian: Glemone; Slovene: Humin; German: Klemaun; Latin: Glemona) is a comune (municipality) in the Regional decentralization entity of Udine, in the Italian region of Friuli-Venezia Giulia, located about 90 kilometres (56 mi) northwest of Trieste and about 25 kilometres (16 mi) northwest of Udine.

The municipality of Gemona del Friuli contains the frazioni (boroughs) Campagnola, Campolessi, Maniaglia, Ospedaletto, Godo, Gois, Centro Storico, Stalis, Taviele and Taboga.

Gemona del Friuli borders the following municipalities: Artegna, Bordano, Buja, Lusevera, Montenars, Osoppo, Trasaghis and Venzone.

Gemona is commandingly located where the large Tagliamento river breaks through the southern edge of the Alps into the Adriatic basin. The old town is on the footslopes of a conoidal debris fan created by the prehistoric partial collapse of Monte Chiampon 1670m. This is an 'alpine megafan' in the Udine cluster of anomalous fans.

== History ==
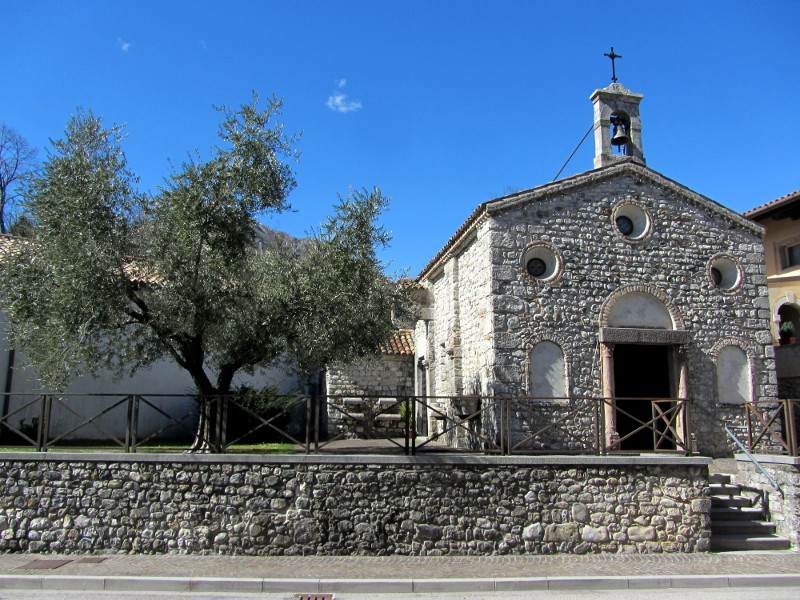
Ognissanti church, Ospedaletto, one of Gemona subdivisions

Evidence of human occupation in Gemona goes back to prehistoric times. The town occupies a key point on the road from Italy to Austria, and there are traces of Celtic occupation around the year 500 BCE.

The area was subject to various invasions in the period 166–750, including Huns, Marcomanni, Ostrogoths, Visigoths and Lombards, who had it as a stronghold from about 558. Lombard historian Paul the Deacon mentions it in 611 as an "impregnable castle". From the fall of the Lombard Kingdom of Italy until 952 Gemona was under Carolingian rulers. During this period the castle was built, the modern town growing around it.

From 776, Gemona became an important part of the Patriarchate of Aquileia. In the 12th century Gemona was an autonomous commune: in 1184 the Emperor Frederick Barbarossa granted a charter for the town's market. In the 13th and 14th centuries it returned to the Patriarchate, until, in 1420, that state was absorbed by the Republic of Venice.

In 1797 French troops under Napoleon defeated the Venetian Republic: in 1798, after the Treaty of Campo Formio, Gemona came under Austrian rule. Following a plebiscite in 1866, Gemona became part of the newly unified Kingdom of Italy.

The present town is medieval in origin but was badly damaged in the 1976 Friuli earthquake. Restoration began the same year, and now the town has been largely restored. Since 2008 the castle gardens have been reopened to the public and since 2010 various cultural events have been held there in the summer. The renovation of the buildings is ongoing: as of November 2024 the clock tower and the former prisons were completed, and since 2019 it has been a museum exhibition venue.

== Main sights ==
Gemona's main attraction is the medieval cathedral (Duomo), dating to the 14th century, with its massive campanile (freestanding bell tower) of the same period. The collections of its Museo Civico include a Madonna and Child by Cima da Conegliano.

== Gallery ==
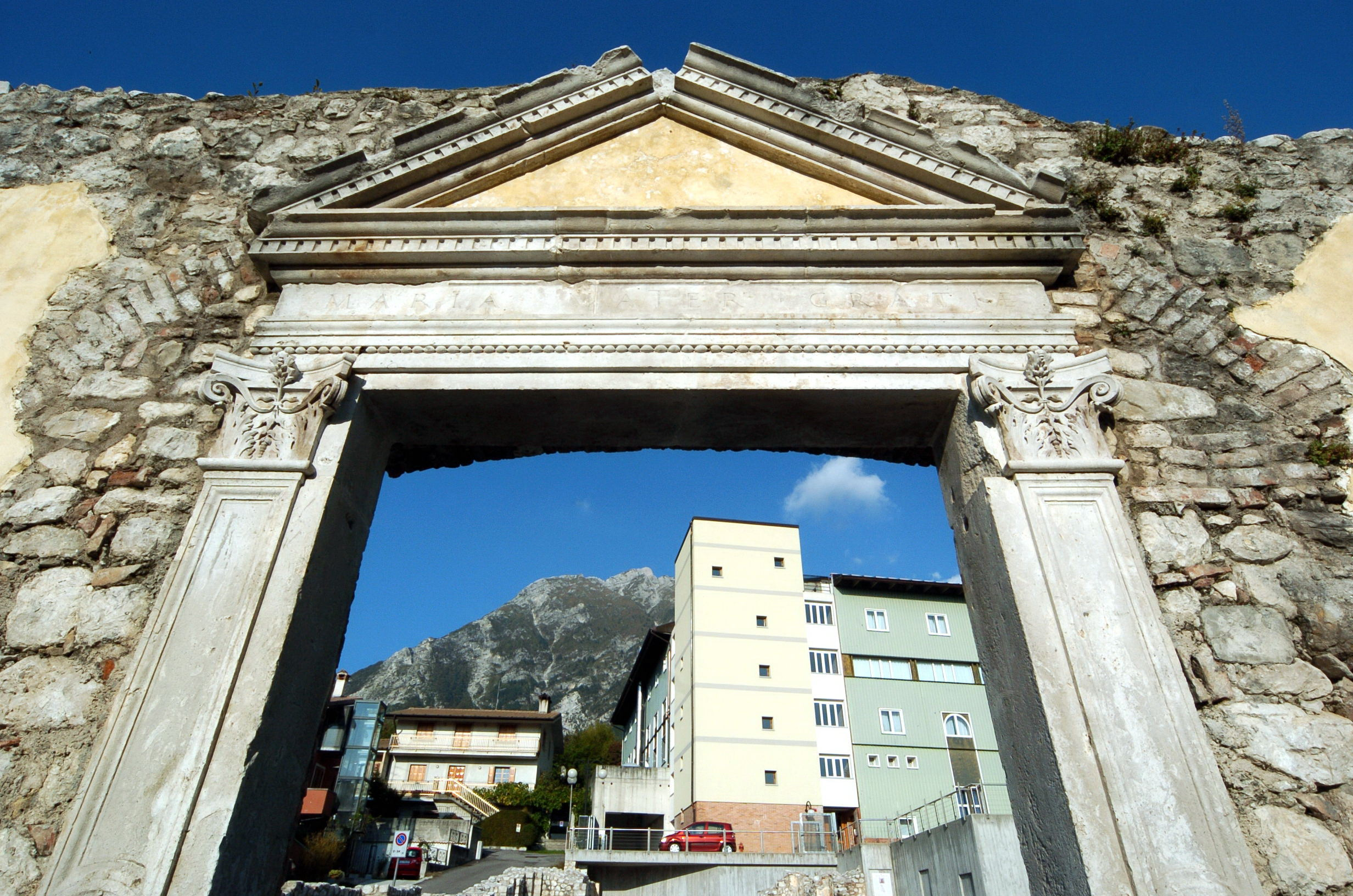
Hulk of the Chiesa della Beata Vergine delle Grazie, as a result of the 1976 earthquake

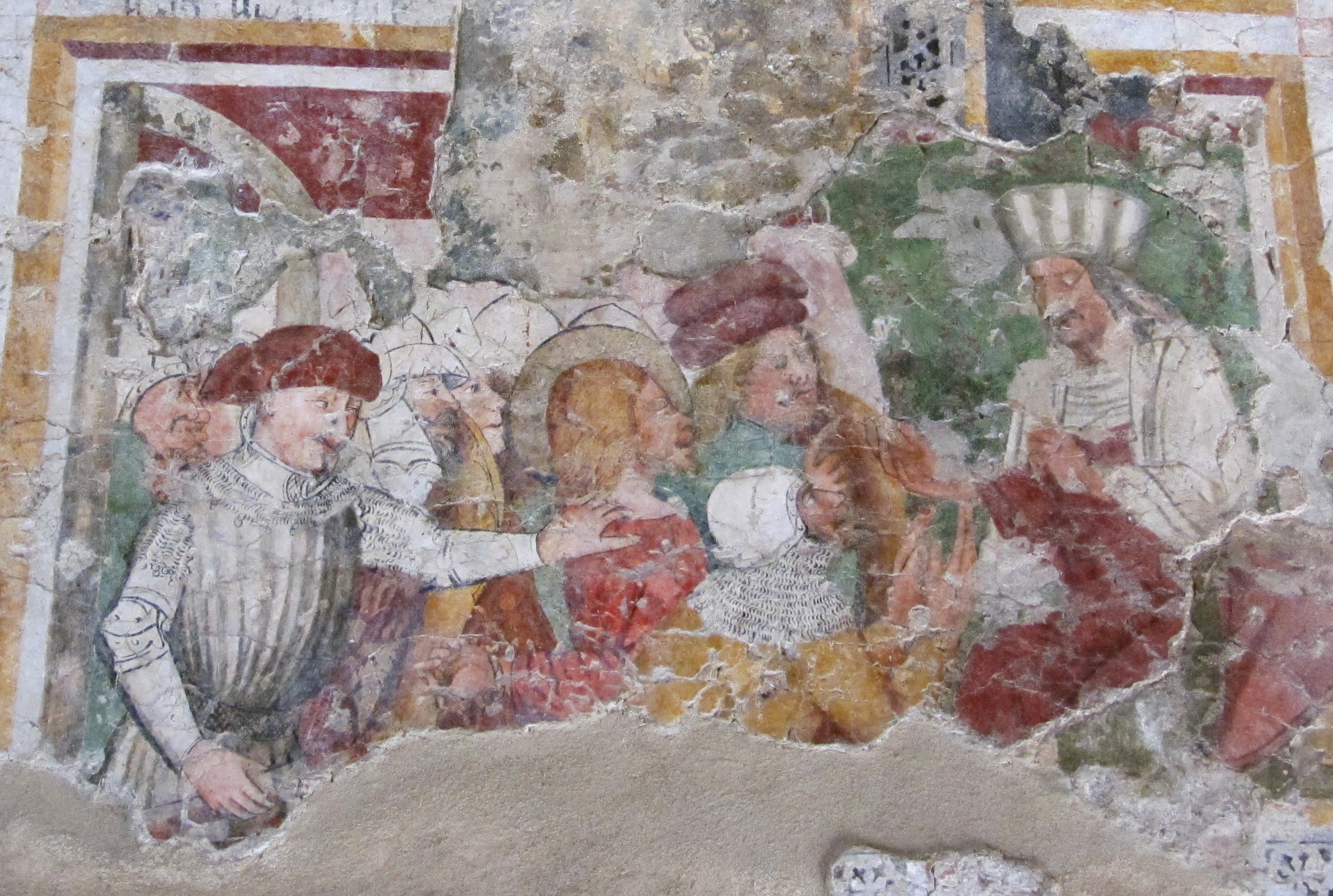
Christ Before Caiaphas, fresco in Ognissanti church, Ospedaletto.

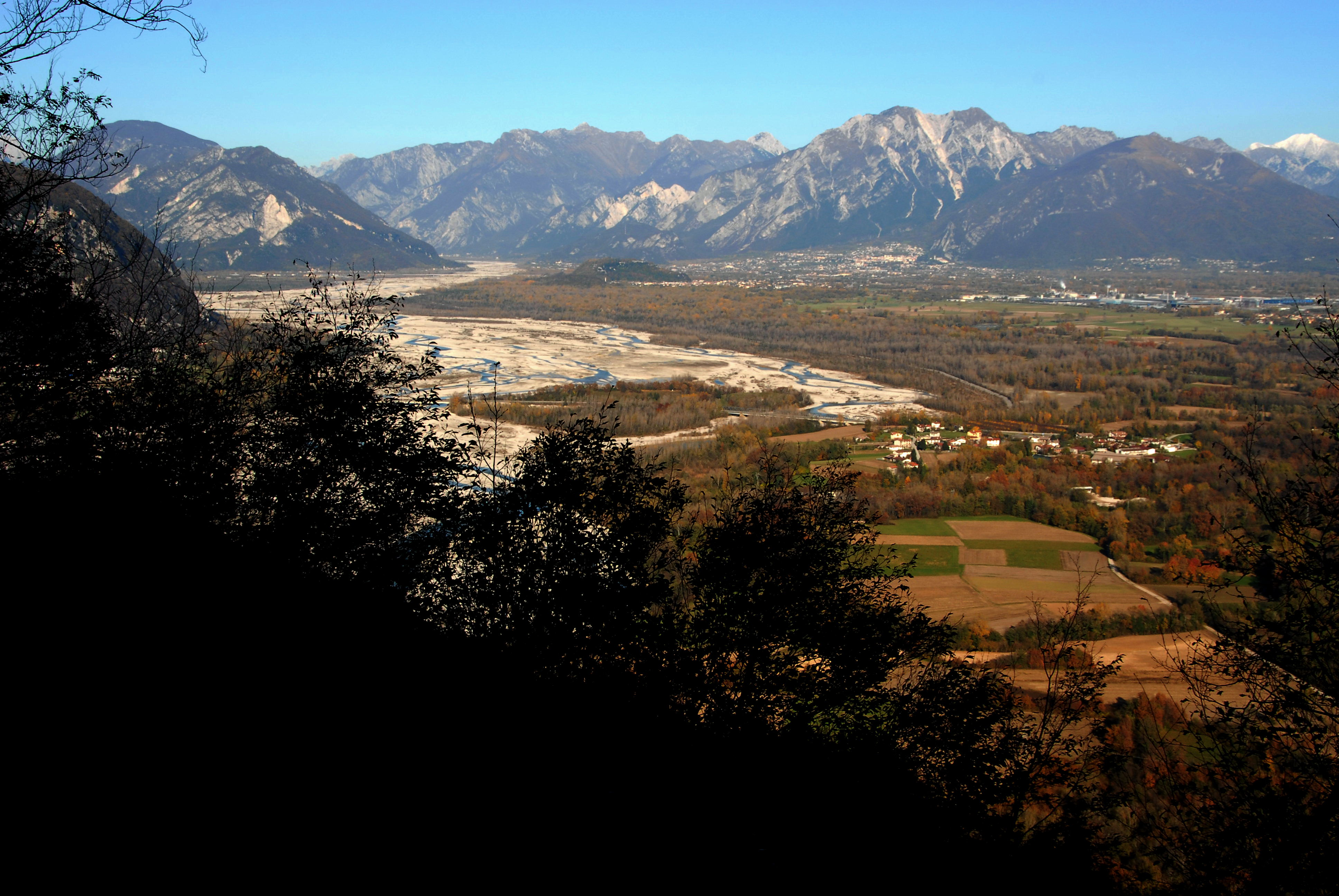
The Tagliamento River with Gemona in the background

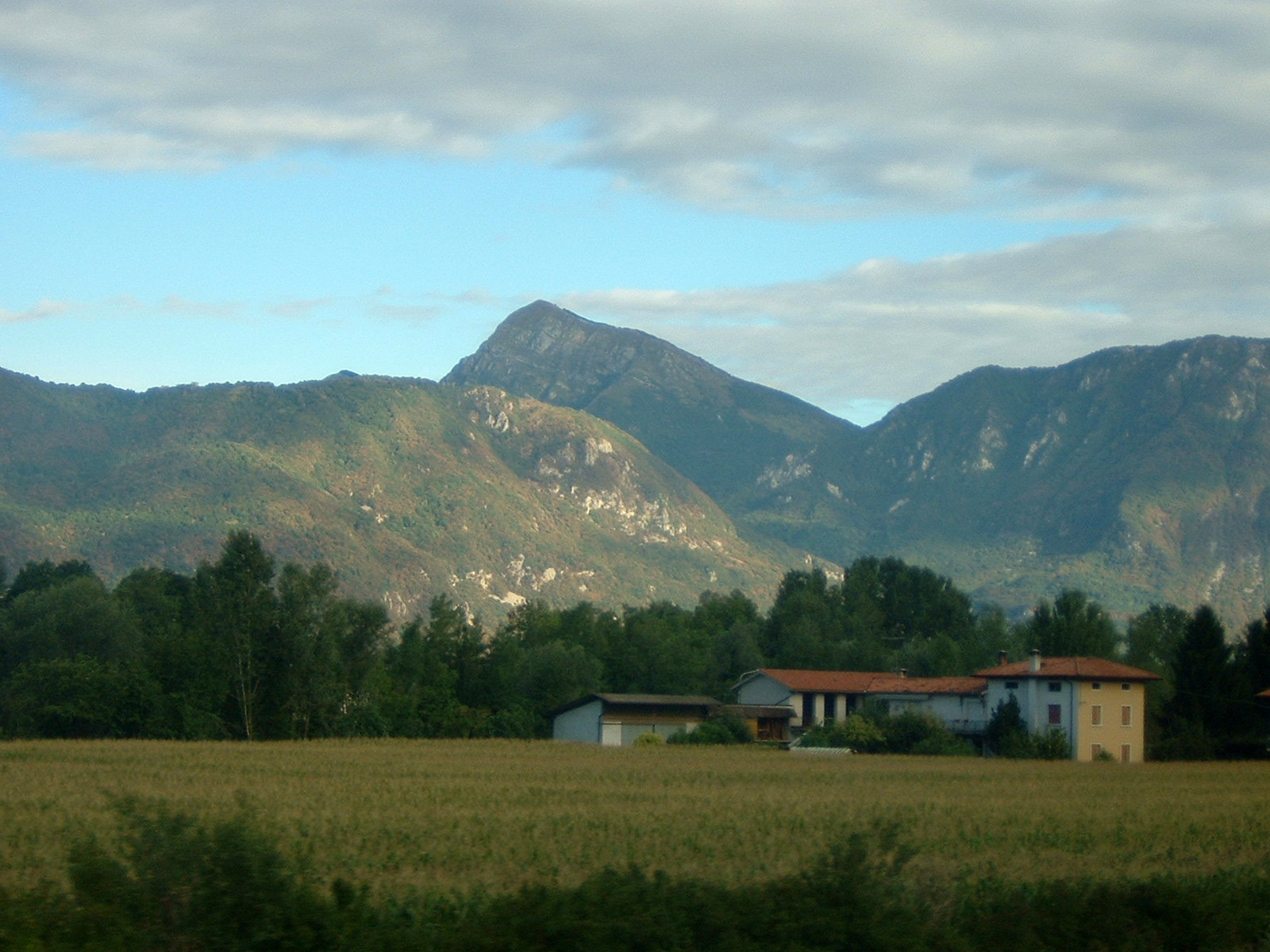
The Carnic Prealps from the Gemona plain

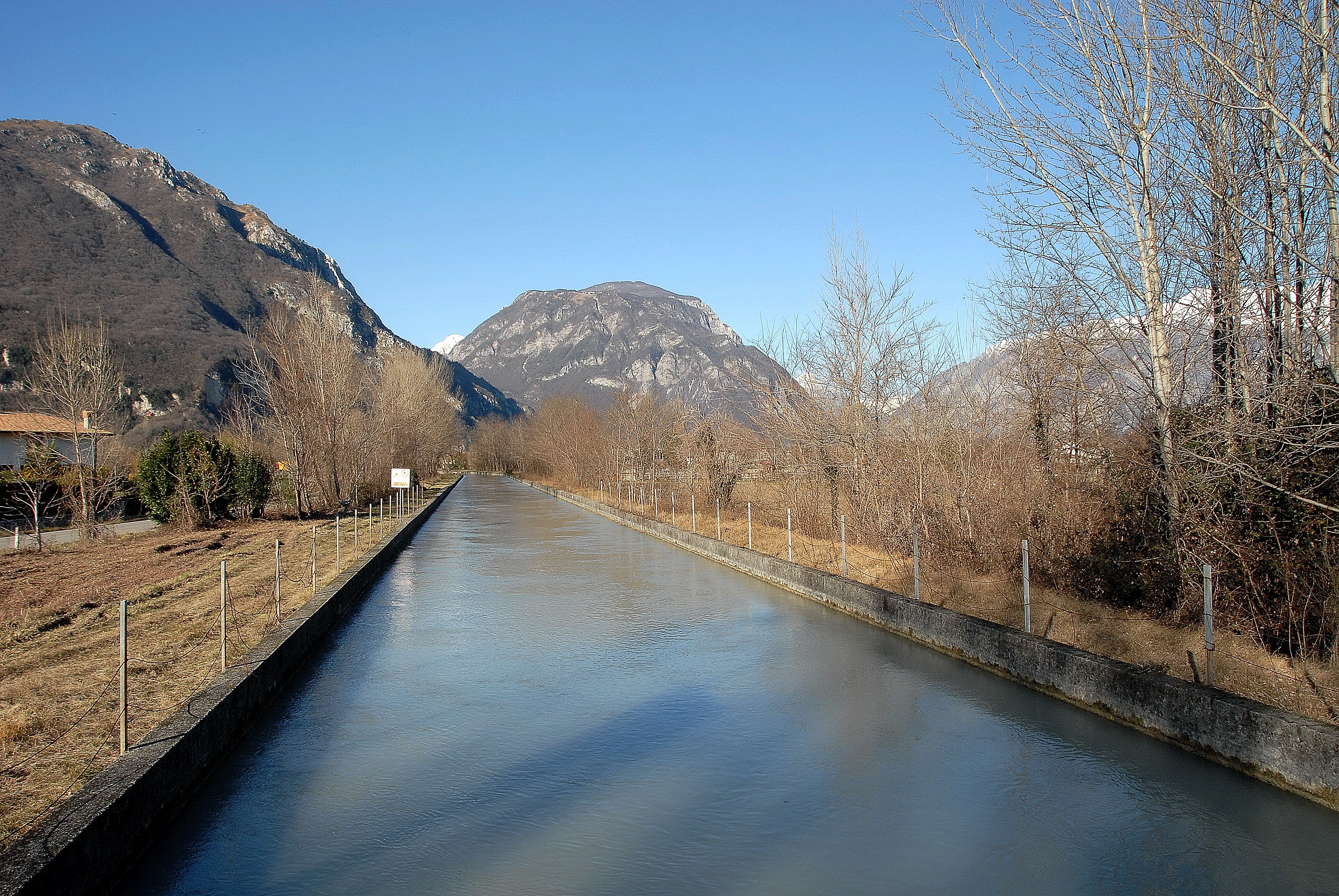
Ledra Canal near Osoppo

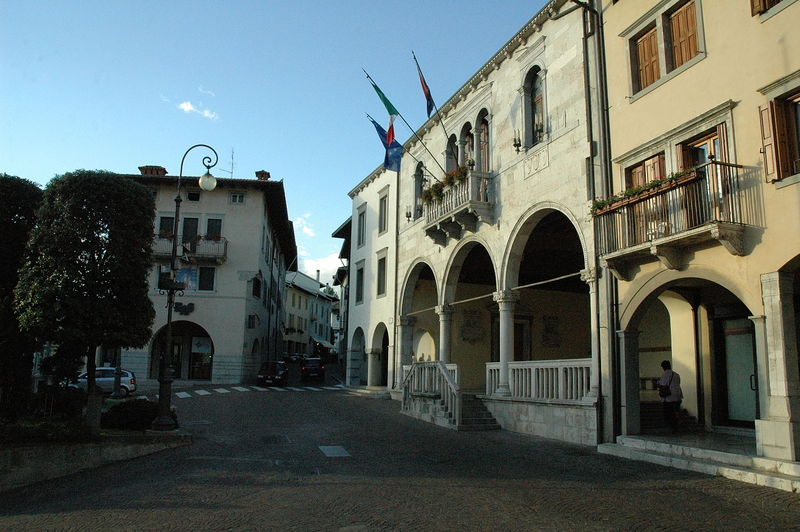
The town hall of Gemona del Friuli

== Infrastructure and transport ==
=== Roads ===
The Gemona-Osoppo junction of the A23 motorway, which leads to Palmanova and the Austrian border, falls within the municipality. State Road 13 Pontebbana also passes through Gemona.

=== Railways ===
Gemona has a station along the Pontebbana railway, which connects Udine to Tarvisio. The station is also the terminus of the railway to Sacile. The station is served by the Micotra rail link, which connects Trieste and Udine to Villach.

=== Urban Mobility ===
Two urban bus lines operated by SAF operate in the municipality: the first connects the hospital to the station via Piazza Garibaldi, while the other runs from the center to the southern outskirts, terminating in Maniaglia. The same company organizes interurban services to Tolmezzo or Udine.

== Twin towns ==
Gemona del Friuli is twinned with:

- Velden am Wörther See, Austria
- Laakirchen, Austria
- Foligno, Italy, since 2001

== Notable people ==
- Alessandro Cicutti (born 1987), footballer

== See also ==
- Lake Ospedaletto
- 1976 Friuli earthquake
