= Colloredo di Monte Albano =

Colloredo di Monte Albano Colorêt di Montalban (Friulian)
- Comune
- Comune di Colloredo di Monte Albano
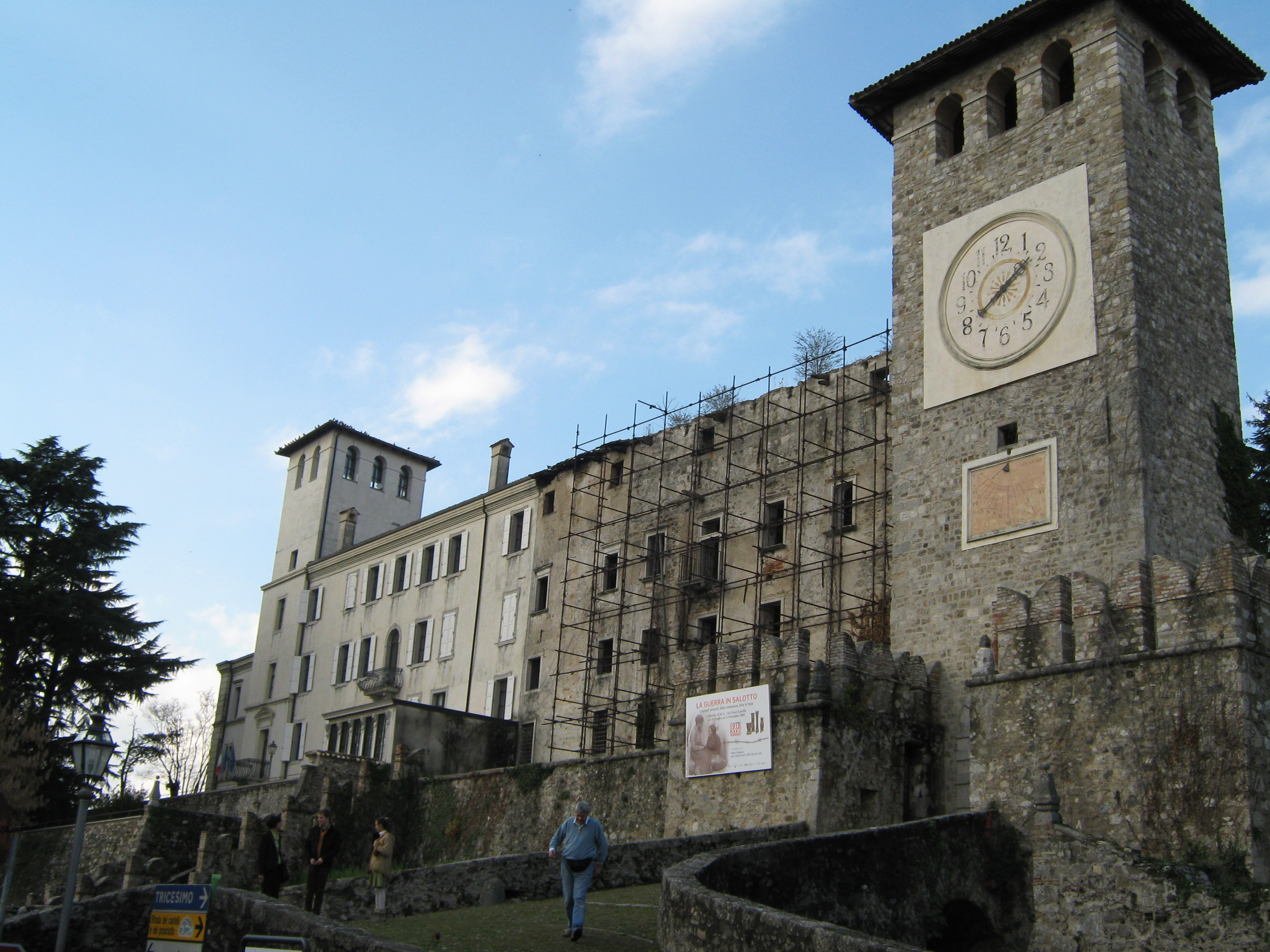

- Location within Italy Location within Friuli-Venezia Giulia
- Coordinates: 46°10′N 13°8′E
- Country: Italy
- Region: Friuli-Venezia Giulia
- Province: Udine (UD)

Area
  - Total: 21 km^{2} (8.1 sq mi)
- Elevation: 218 m (715 ft)

Population (2018-01-01)
  - Total: 2,187
  - Density: 100/km^{2} (270/sq mi)
- Time zone: UTC+1 (CET)
  - Summer (DST): UTC+2 (CEST)
- Website: Official website

Colloredo di Monte Albano (Friulian: Colorêt di Montalban) is a comune (municipality) in the Regional decentralization entity of Udine in the Italian region of Friuli-Venezia Giulia, located about 80 kilometres (50 mi) northwest of Trieste and about 14 kilometres (9 mi) northwest of Udine.

== History ==
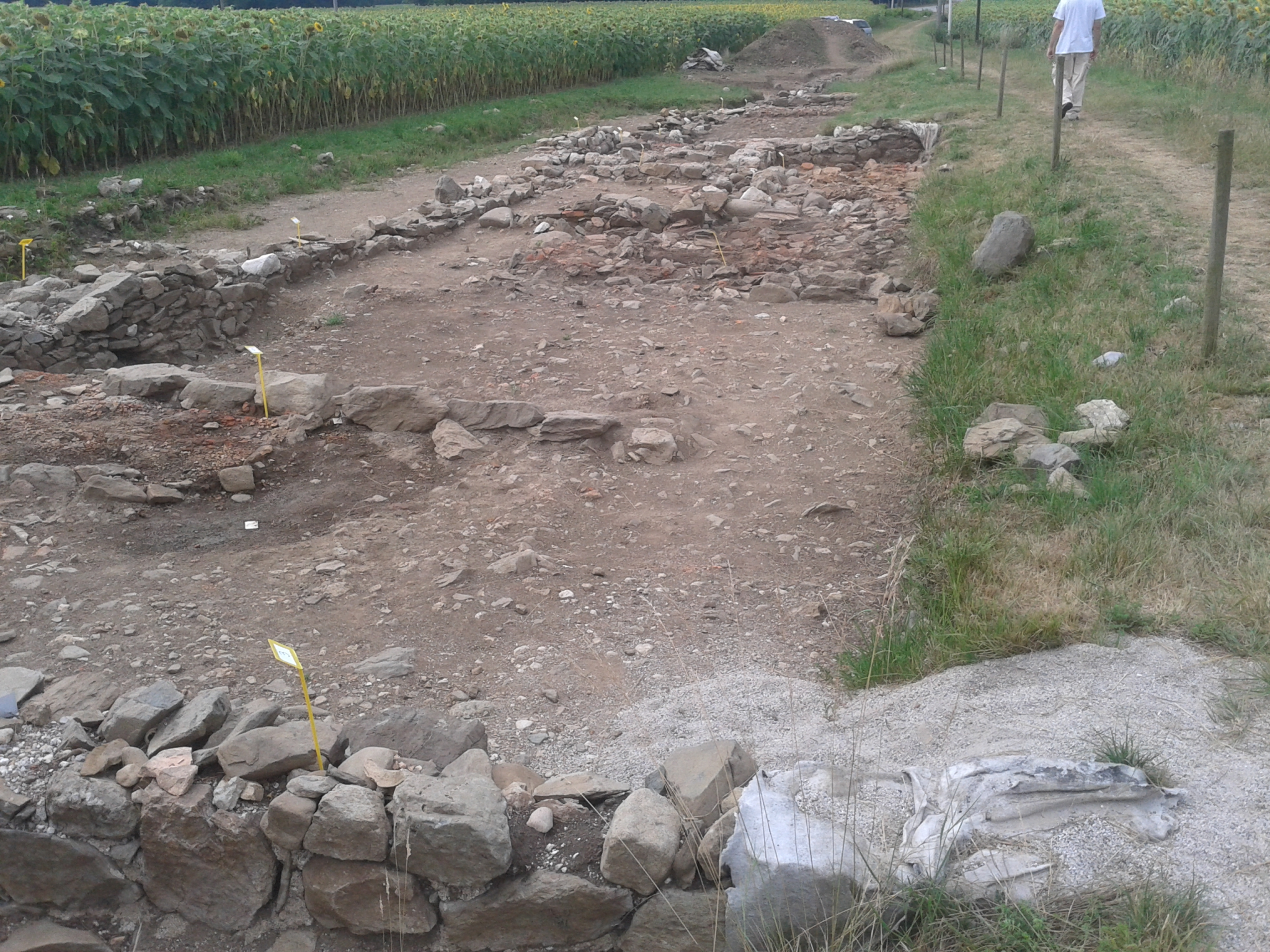
Roman villa at Muris

The Roman villa at Muris has recently been discovered nearby.

Starting from the 11th century, it was a fief of the Viscounts of Mels, who had received it from the Counts of Tyrol.

In 1420, together will all Friuli, the hamlet was acquired by the Republic of Venice.

In 1976 the town was severely damaged by the Friuli earthquake.

The 19th century writer Ippolito Nievo lived and wrote his novels in the castle of Colloredo (still now property of the Nievo counts).

== The Roman villa ==
Recent excavations gave some unexpected surprises.

The most sensational find has no comparison with anything similar preserved in museums or in collections of antiquities: a sheet of lead of approximately 3x6 cm, broken in two and pierced in the centre, engraved with the inscription COMMODO CERIALIS VITIS SETINA which refers to a label for wine or vines from Setia and identifies the year by the name of the two consuls in office in 106 AD, Lucius Ceionus Commodus and Sextus Vettulenus Civica Cerialis. The vines grown in Sezze (Setia), a town in the province of Latina located on the heights overlooking the Pontine Marshes, produced a highly appreciated wine in antiquity, mentioned by Pliny the Elder, Strabo, Stazio, Silio Italico, Celio Aureliano, Juvenal, but it is above all Martial who exalts and remember in thirteen epigrams; from him we learn that it was a red wine. In emperor Trajan's era the villa rustica of Moruzzo had to do with a fine wine, perhaps delivered in a wooden barrel identified by the label with the name of the consuls which attested to the year of production, or more likely for having received the cuttings to be planted in a new vineyard.

Another surprise was that inside two rooms, substantial piles of bovine bones were found, even a whole carcass, almost as if the animals, at least five, had still been buried with the meat; subsequent analyses have shown that they had only been skinned and dehorned. There was no trace of fire or sudden abandonment, and the other finds were very few: pottery shards, a few handles and an amphora cap, a broken oil lamp, a billhook, part of a fibula, a balance weight, some coins of little value.

In 168-170 AD the Roman Empire, at the peak of its power, suffered a very serious setback when the Germanic tribes of the Quadi and Marcomanni overwhelmed the legionary defenses near Vienna and arrived in Italy to raid and loot. Emperor Marcus Aurelius recalled the legions from the East, but with the soldiers also came the scourge of the plague, which infected men and animals. These two elements, the fear of new invasions and the epidemic, could explain the progressive downsizing of the housing structures of the farm which was depopulating and the burial of the whole animals because they were infected, removing only what was possible to use without health risks.

The villa of Moruzzo is considered worthy of conservation and further study.
