= Friuli-Venezia Giulia =

Autonomous region of Italy

Coordinates: 45°38′N 13°48′E

Friuli-Venezia Giulia: Friûl Vignesie Julie (Friulian); Friułi-Venesia Julia (Venetian); Furlanija-Julijska krajina (Slovene)
- Autonomous region
- Flag Coat of arms
- Anthem: "Incuintri al doman"
- Country: Italy
- Capital: Trieste

Government
  - Type: Presidential system
  - President: Massimiliano Fedriga (LFVG–Lega)

Area
  - Total: 7,924.36 km^{2} (3,059.61 sq mi)

Population (2026)
  - Total: 1,193,496
  - Density: 150.611/km^{2} (390.081/sq mi)
- Demonyms: English: Friuli-Venezia Giulian; Italian: Friulano (man); Italian: Friulana (woman); Italian: Giuliano (man); Italian: Giuliana (woman)

GDP
  - Total: €46.602 billion (2024)
  - Per capita: €39,063 (2024)
- Time zone: UTC+1 (CET)
  - Summer (DST): UTC+2 (CEST)
- ISO 3166 code: IT-36
- HDI (2022): 0.910 very high • 7th of 21
- NUTS Region: ITD
- Website: regione.fvg.it

Friuli-Venezia Giulia (Note: Usage of the hyphen, even in official sources, is inconsistent. While it is present in the Constitution of Italy, the region is also regularly referred to as Friuli Venezia Giulia in other official sources.) (Note: Italian pronunciation: [friˈuːli veˈnɛttsja ˈdʒuːlja]) (Note: It may be pronounced /friˌuːli vɛˌnɛtsiə ˈdʒuːliə/ in British English, and /- veɪˌnɛtsiə ˈdʒuːljə/, /- vɛˌnɛtsjə ˈdʒuːljə/, or /ˌfriːəli vəˌniːtsiə ˈdʒuːljə/ in American English.) (Note: Friulian: Friûl-Vignesie Julie; Slovene: Furlanija-Julijska krajina; Venetian: Friułi-Venesia Julia or Friul-Venesia Julia; Austrian German: Friaul-Julisch Venetien.) is one of the 20 regions of Italy and one of five autonomous regions with special statute. The regional capital is Trieste on the Gulf of Trieste, a bay of the Adriatic Sea.

Friuli-Venezia Giulia has a population of 1,193,496 in an area of 7,924.36 square kilometres (3,059.61 sq mi) as of 2026. A natural opening to the sea for many central European countries, the region is traversed by the major transport routes between the east and west of Southern Europe. It encompasses the historical-geographical region of Friuli and a small portion of the historical region of Venezia Giulia—also known in English as the Julian March—each with its own distinct history, traditions and identity.

== Etymology ==
Friuli comes from the Latin term Forum Julii ('Julius' forum'), a center for commerce in the Roman times, which today corresponds to the city of Cividale. The denomination Venezia Giulia ('Julian Venetia', not referring to the city of Venice but to the Roman province of Venetia et Histria) was proposed by the Italian linguist Graziadio Isaia Ascoli, with the intention of marking the Italian cultural spirit of the area.

== History ==
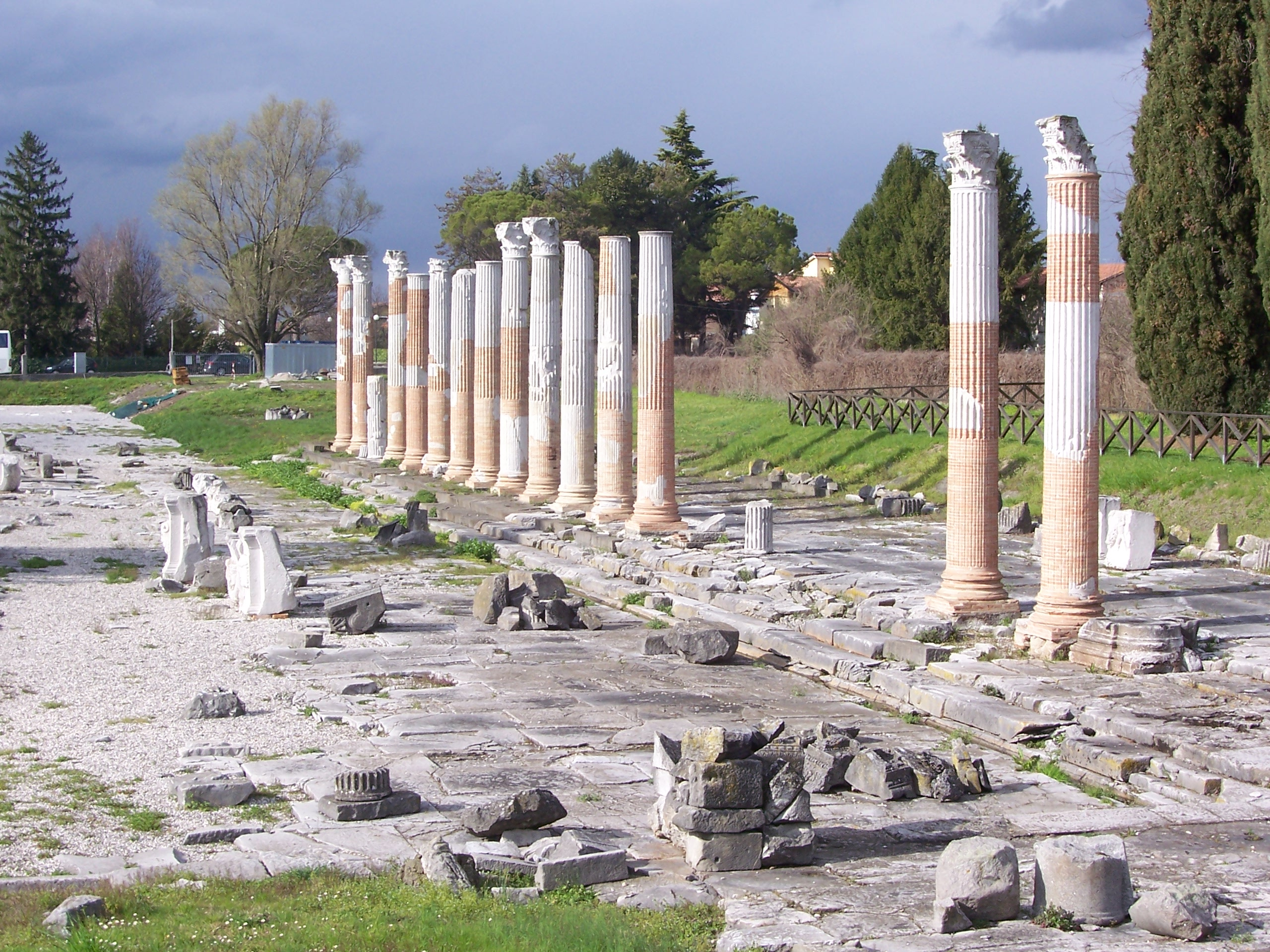
Roman ruins in Aquileia

In Roman times, modern Friuli-Venezia Giulia was located within Regio X Venetia et Histria of Roman Italy. The traces of its Roman origin are visible all over the area. In fact, the city of Aquileia, founded in 181 BC, served as the regional capital and rose to prominence in the Augustan era.

Following the Lombard settlements in the 6th century, the historical paths of Friuli and Venezia Giulia began to diverge. In 568, Cividale del Friuli (the Roman Forum Iulii (from which the name Friuli is derived)) became the capital of the first Lombard dukedom in Italy. In the 6th century, the Alpine Slavs, ancestors of present-day Slovenes, settled the eastern areas of the region. They settled in the easternmost mountainous areas of Friuli known as the Friulian Slavia, as well as in the Karst Plateau and in the area north and south of Gorizia. In the 12th and 13th centuries, they also moved closer to Trieste.

In 774 Charlemagne conquered Lombard Italy and absorbed it into Francia (the Frankish Empire from 800), with the Lombard Duke of Friuli replaced by a Frankish one. In 787 Charlemagne established a new patriarch at Aquileia. The duchy was dissolved in 828 and partitioned into smaller counties. In 843 the Empire was partitioned in the Treaty of Verdun placing Friuli at the frontier between Middle Francia (later the Kingdom of Italy) and East Francia (later the Kingdom of Germany) and in 846 the former duchy was reconstituted as the March of Friuli. In 961 Otto the Great of Germany took control of the Kingdom of Italy and established the Holy Roman Empire. In 1077, the Holy Roman Emperor recognized the territorial powers of the Patriarchate of Aquileia that temporarily extended its rule to areas to the east; however, by the 12th century the County of Gorizia had become independent. Trieste developed into the Imperial Free City of Trieste. The coastal territory between Gorizia and Trieste was controlled by the March of Carniola (Duchy of Carniola from 1364).

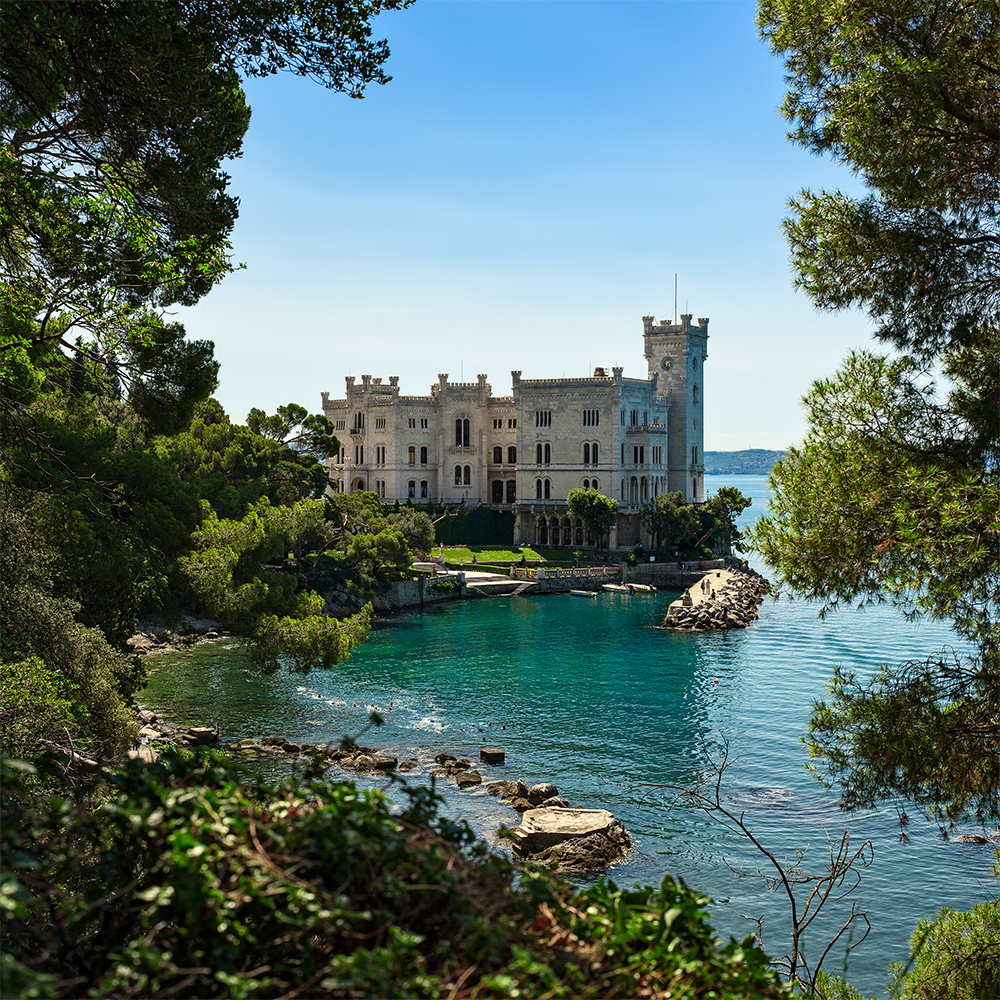
Miramare Castle, built by Archduke Maximilian of Austria, later Emperor of Mexico, in Trieste

Friuli became Venetian territory in 1420; Trieste and Gorizia, which remained within the Holy Roman Empire, came under Habsburg (Austrian) dominance in 1382 and 1500 respectively. The Venetian fortress of Gradisca d'Isonzo was retaken by the Empire in 1511 and incorporated into Gorizia but Monfalcone to the south remained an effective Venetian exclave. Pordenone was a corpus separatum, under Austrian influence until 1515, when it fell to Venetian rule. Gradisca was separated from Gorizia in 1647 but were reunited in 1754 to form the Princely County of Gorizia and Gradisca.

With the 1797 Treaty of Campo Formio, Venetian domination came to an end and Friuli was ceded to the Habsburg Monarchy (formally part of the Austrian Empire from 1804); however, Austria was forced to cede it to the Napoleonic Kingdom of Italy in the 1805 Peace of Pressburg, along with the parts of the County of Gorizia and Gradisca west of the Isonzo (the boundary was formalized in the 1807 Treaty of Fontainebleau). Trieste and Gorizia were then also ceded to the Napoleonic Illyrian Provinces in the 1809 Treaty of Schönbrunn.

In 1815, following the end of the Napoleonic Wars, the Congress of Vienna returned the area to Austria: Friuli was included in the Kingdom of Lombardy–Venetia, while Gorizia and Trieste were assigned to the Kingdom of Illyria (both crown lands of the Austrian Empire), with the boundary roughly following the former Imperial-Venetian border. In 1849 Illyria was abolished and Gorizia and Trieste both became part of the Austrian Littoral crown land, along with Istria and several islands in the Kvarner Gulf.

Under the enlightened government and policies set by the Austrian Empire and continued by the Austrian-Hungarian Empire in the 18th and 19th centuries, Trieste flourished, reaching an extraordinary economic development as the main harbor of the Habsburg empire. The Third Italian War of Independence led to the annexation of Lombardy-Venetia, including Friuli, to the Kingdom of Italy, while the Littoral remained in Austrian hands.

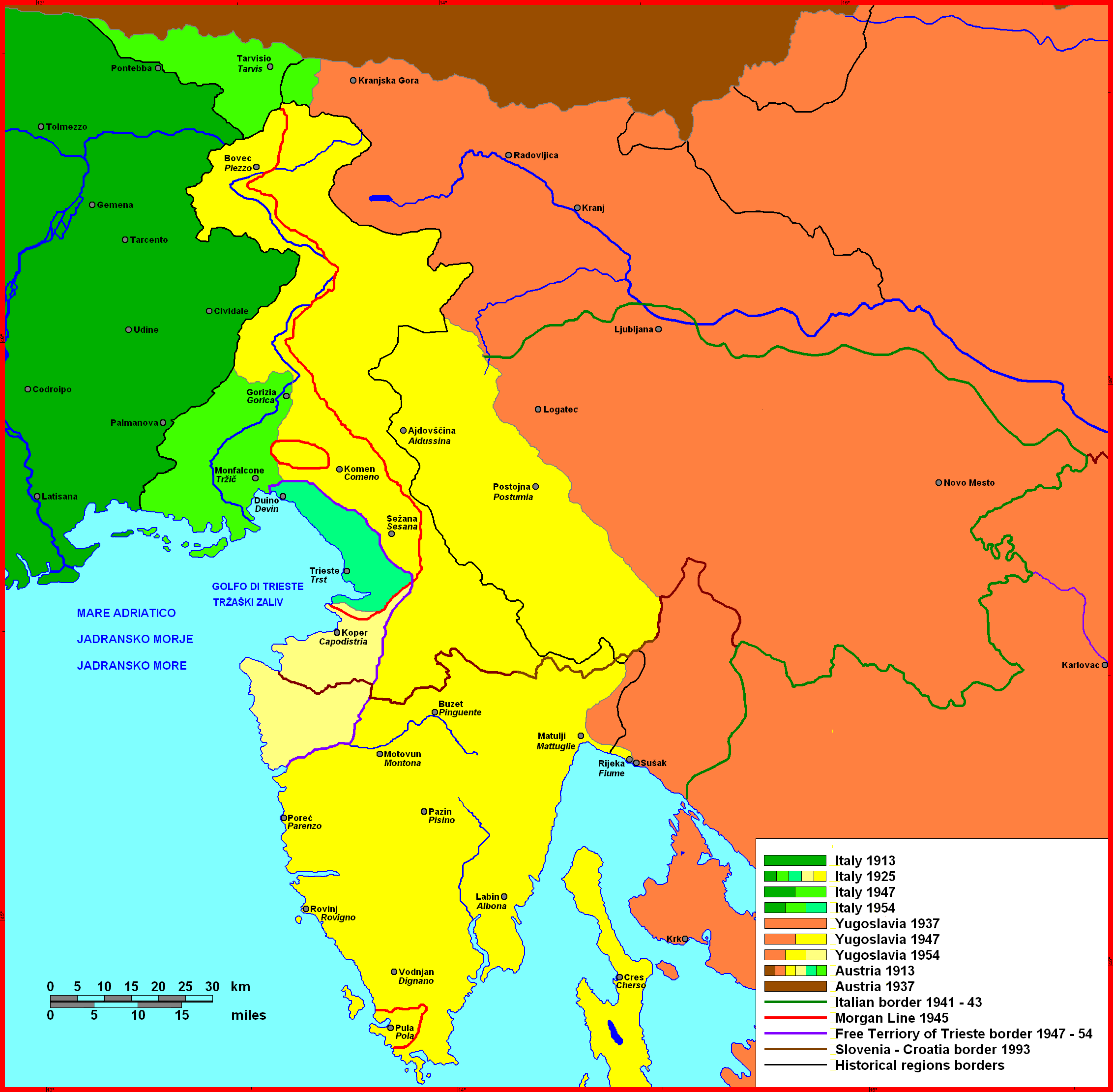
Changes to the Italian eastern border from 1920 to 1975: Areas annexed to Italy in 1920 by the Treaty of Rapallo (with adjustments of its border in 1924 after the Treaty of Rome); ceded to Yugoslavia in 1947 by the Treaty of Paris Areas annexed to Italy in 1920 which remained Italian after 1947 Areas annexed to Italy in 1920 which passed to the Free Territory of Trieste in 1947 with the Paris treaties; definitively assigned to Italy in 1975 by the Treaty of Osimo Areas annexed to Italy in 1920 which passed to the Free Territory of Trieste in 1947 with the Paris treaties; definitively assigned to Yugoslavia in 1975 by the Osimo treaty

During the First World War, the region was a prominent theatre for military operations and suffered serious damage and loss of lives. After the war, the former Littoral was annexed by Italy in the 1920 Treaty of Rapallo, although Venezia Giulia's borders were the subject of an international dispute.

The Second World War led to the creation of the Anglo-American Administration in Trieste until the border was defined in the 1954 Memorandum of London. After Trieste was reassigned to Italy, the Autonomous Region of Friuli-Venezia Giulia was finally established.

The region's name was Friuli-Venezia Giulia (hyphenated) until 2001, when the official spelling Friuli Venezia Giulia (without hyphen) was adopted following the modification of Article No.116 of the Italian Constitution. The term "Venezia Giulia" was coined by Graziadio Isaia Ascoli.

== Geography ==
Map of Tre Venezie

Friuli-Venezia Giulia is Italy's north-easternmost region. It covers an area of 7,858 km^{2} and is the fifth smallest region of the country. It borders Austria to the north and Slovenia to the east, the three countries meeting at the tripoint on the mountain of Dreiländereck, known as Monte Forno in Italian. To the south, it faces the Adriatic Sea and to the west the Veneto region.

The region spans a wide variety of climates and landscapes from the mild Oceanic in the south to Alpine continental in the north. The total area is subdivided into 42.5% mountainous-alpine terrain in the north, 19.3% is hilly, mostly to the southeast, while the remaining 38.2% comprises the central and coastal plains.

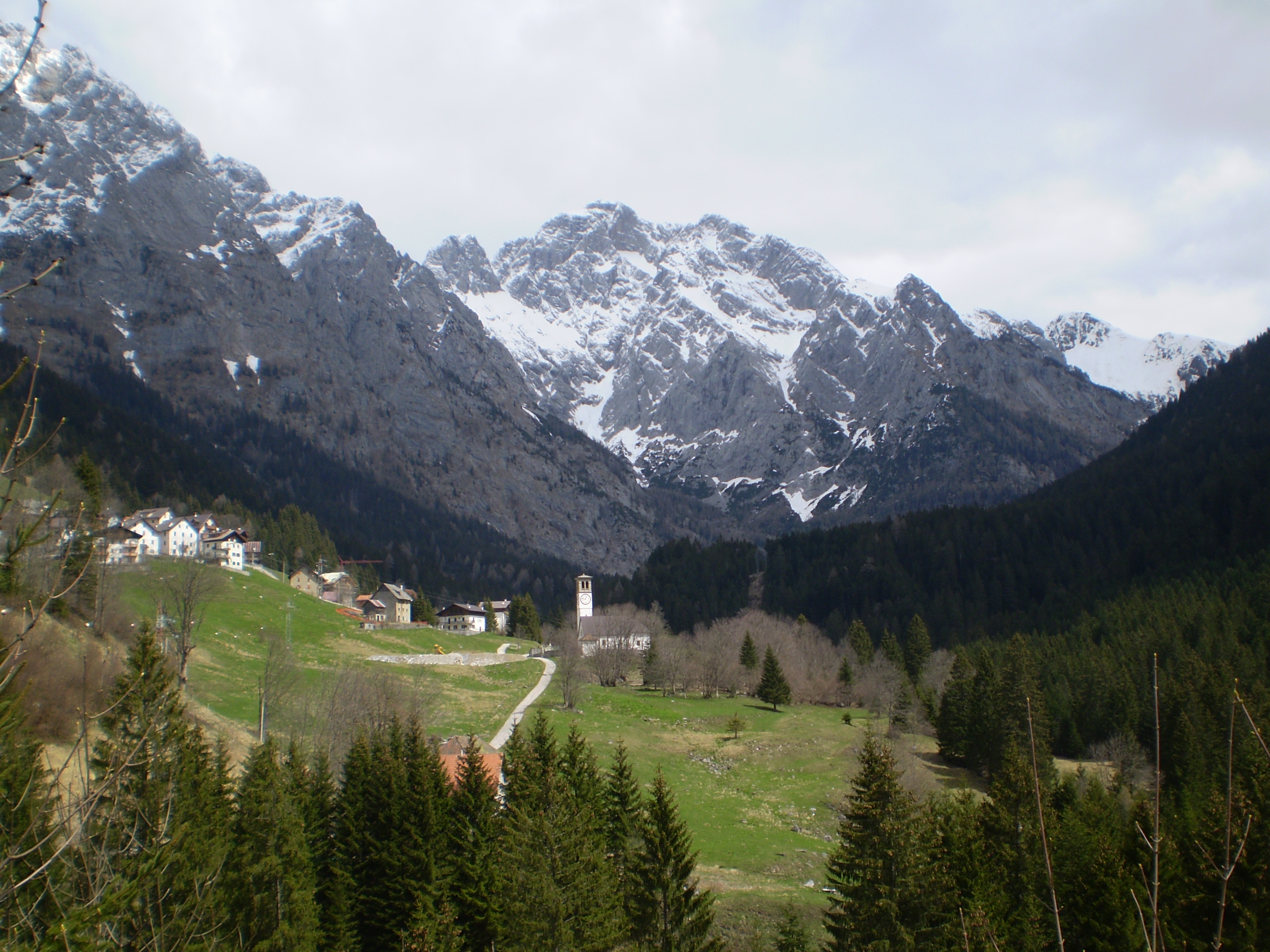
A view of the Carnia highlands

Morphologically the region can be subdivided into four main areas. The mountainous area in the north: this part of the region includes Carnia and the ending section of the Alps (Carnic Alps and Julian Alps), of which the highest peaks exceed 2,700 m above sea level (Jôf di Montasio 2,754 m). Its landscapes are characterised by vast pine forests and pastures, mountain lakes (e.g. Sauris, Fusine, and Barcis), and numerous streams and small rivers descending from the mountains.

The area is also known for its tourist destinations, especially during the winter season (Monte Zoncolan, Tarvisio, Sella Nevea, Forni di Sopra and Piancavallo). The hilly area is situated to the south of the mountains and along the central section of the border with Slovenia. The main product of agriculture in this area is wine, whose quality, especially the white, is known worldwide. The easternmost part of the hilly area is also known as Slavia Friulana, as it is mostly inhabited by ethnic Slovenes.

The central plains are characterized by poor, arid, and permeable soil. The soil has been made fertile with an extensive irrigation system and through the adoption of modern intensive farming techniques. In this part of the region, most of the agricultural activities are concentrated. The coastal area can be further subdivided into two, western-eastern, subsections separated by the River Isonzo's estuary.

To the west, the coast is shallow and sandy, with numerous tourist resorts and the lagoons of Grado and Marano Lagunare. To the east, the coastline rises into cliffs, where the Karst Plateau meets the Adriatic, all the way to Trieste and Muggia on the border with Slovenia. The Carso has geological features and phenomena such as hollows, cave networks, and underground rivers, which extend inland in the provinces of Trieste and Gorizia, with an altitude ranging between 300m and 600m.

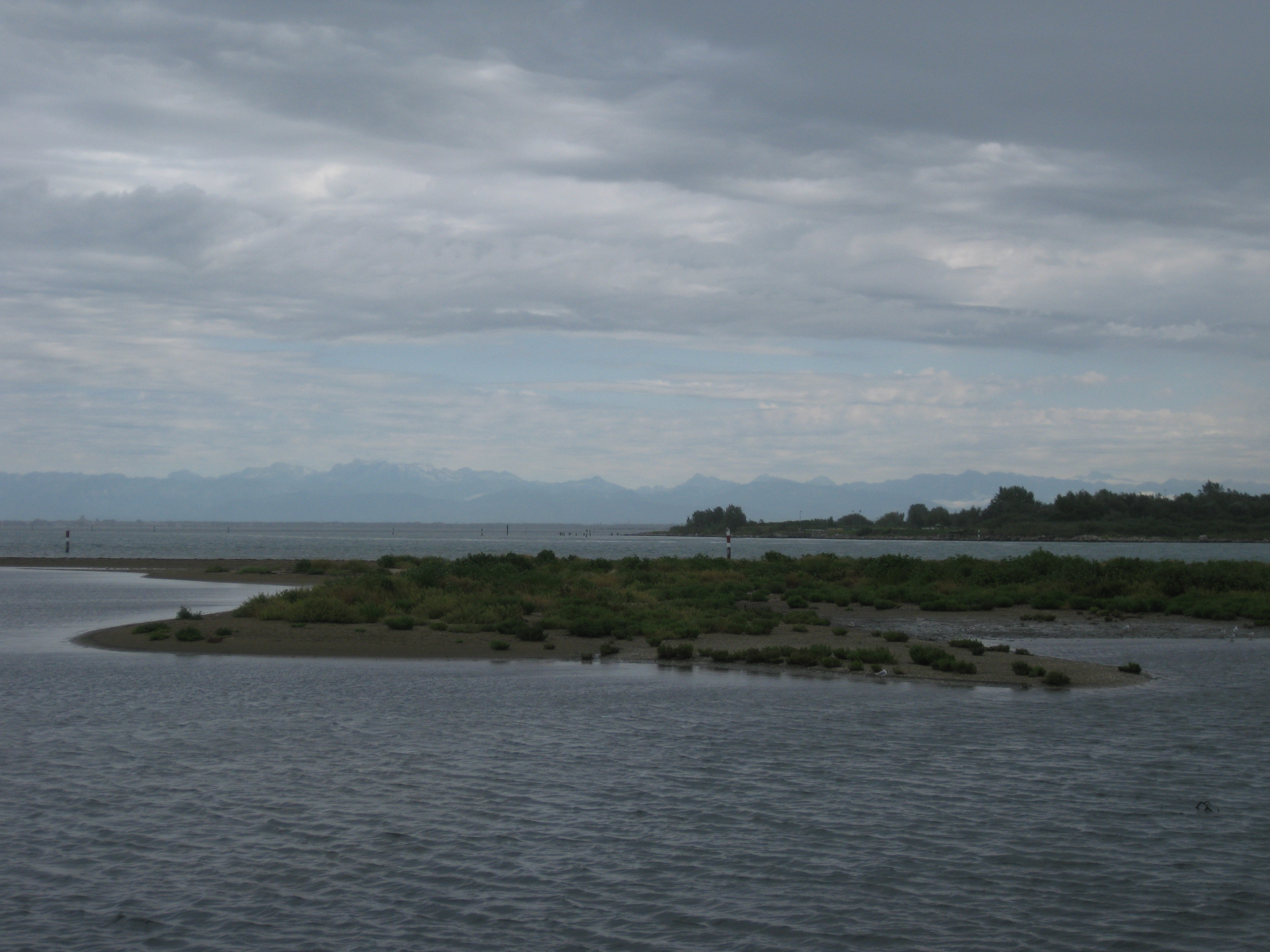
Grado Lagoon

The rivers of the region flow from the North and from Slovenia into the Adriatic. The two main rivers are the Tagliamento, which flows west–east in its upper part in the Carnic Alps and then bends into a north–south flow that separates the Julian Alps from Alpine foothills and the Isonzo (Slovenian: Soča) which flows from Slovenia into Italy. The Timavo is an underground river that flows for 38 km from Slovenia and resurfaces near its mouth north-west of Duino.

The region Friuli-Venezia Giulia has a temperate climate. However, due to the terrain's diversity, it varies considerably from one area to another. Walled by the Alps on its northern flank, the region is exposed to air masses from the East and the West. The region receives also the southerly Sirocco from the Adriatic Sea, which brings in heavy rainfall. Along the coast, the climate is mild and pleasant.

Trieste records the smallest temperature differences between winter and summer and between day and night. The climate is Alpine-continental in the mountainous areas, where, in some locations, the coldest winter temperatures in Italy can often be found. The Kras plateau has its own weather and climate, influenced, mostly during autumn and winter, by masses of cold air coming from the northeast. These generate a very special feature of the local climate: the north-easterly wind Bora, which descends onto the Gulf of Trieste with gusts occasionally exceeding speeds of 150 km/h.

=== Biodiversity ===
The region is considered the core area of golden jackals in Italy, due to it containing the highest number of reproducing individuals and its genetic links with the source populations in the neighbouring Balkans. As of 2024, the population of jackals in Friuli-Venezia Giulia has been calculated at 400.

=== Julian March ===
The Julian March within the Kingdom of Italy (1923–1947), with its four provinces: the Province of Gorizia (blue), the Province of Trieste (green), the Province of Fiume (red), the Province of Pola (yellow)

The Julian March (Croatian and Slovene: Julijska krajina), also called Julian Venetia (Italian: Venezia Giulia; Venetian: Venesia Julia; Friulian: Vignesie Julie; Austrian German: Julisch Venetien), is an area of southern Central Europe which is currently divided among Croatia, Italy, and Slovenia. The term was coined in 1863 by the Italian linguist Graziadio Isaia Ascoli, a native of the area, to demonstrate that the Austrian Littoral, Veneto, Friuli, and Trentino (then all part of the Austrian Empire) shared a common Italian linguistic identity. Ascoli emphasized the Augustan partition of Roman Italy at the beginning of the Empire, when Venetia et Histria was Regio X (the Tenth Region).

The term was later endorsed by Italian irredentists, who sought to annex regions in which ethnic Italians made up most (or a substantial portion) of the population: the Austrian Littoral, Trentino, Fiume and Dalmatia. The Triple Entente promised the regions to Italy in the dissolution of the Austro-Hungarian Empire in exchange for Italy's joining the Allied Powers in World War I. The secret 1915 Treaty of London promised Italy territories largely inhabited by Italians (such as Trentino) in addition to those largely inhabited by Croats or Slovenes; the territories housed 421,444 Italians, and about 327,000 ethnic Slovenes.

A contemporary Italian autonomous region, bordering on Slovenia, is named Friuli-Venezia Giulia ("Friuli and Julian Venetia").

== Demographics ==
Historical population
Year	Pop.	±%
1871	509,142	—
1881	530,965	+4.3%
1901	616,758	+16.2%
1911	729,066	+18.2%
1921	1,179,834	+61.8%
1931	1,176,928	−0.2%
1936	1,109,613	−5.7%
1951	1,227,674	+10.6%
1961	1,205,821	−1.8%
1971	1,214,946	+0.8%
1981	1,235,363	+1.7%
1991	1,199,039	−2.9%
2001	1,185,123	−1.2%
2011	1,220,291	+3.0%
2021	1,194,647	−2.1%
Source: ISTAT

As of 2026, the population is 1,193,496, of which 49.1% are male, and 50.9% are female. Minors make up 13.4% of the population, and seniors make up 27.9%. The population density of 150.6 inhabitants per km^{2} is lower than the national figure of 195.1. Across the provinces, density varies from a minimum of 103.8 inhabitants per km^{2} in the province of Udine to 1,072 in the province of Trieste.

The negative natural balance in the region is partly made up by the positive net migration. To some extent the migratory surplus has in fact offset the downward trend in the population since 1975.

=== Immigration ===
As of 2025, immigrants make up 15.6% of the population, the 2nd-highest proportion out of the Italian regions. The 5 largest foreign countries of birth are Romania, Albania, Switzerland, Ukraine, and Bangladesh.

Foreign population by country of birth (2025)
Country of birth	Population
Romania	22,343
Albania	15,476
Switzerland	9,085
Ukraine	8,430
Bangladesh	7,811
Serbia	7,737
France	6,101
Croatia	5,350
Bosnia and Herzegovina	5,227
Morocco	4,962
Pakistan	4,898
Kosovo	4,894
India	4,621
Argentina	4,370
Moldova	4,357

== Government and politics ==
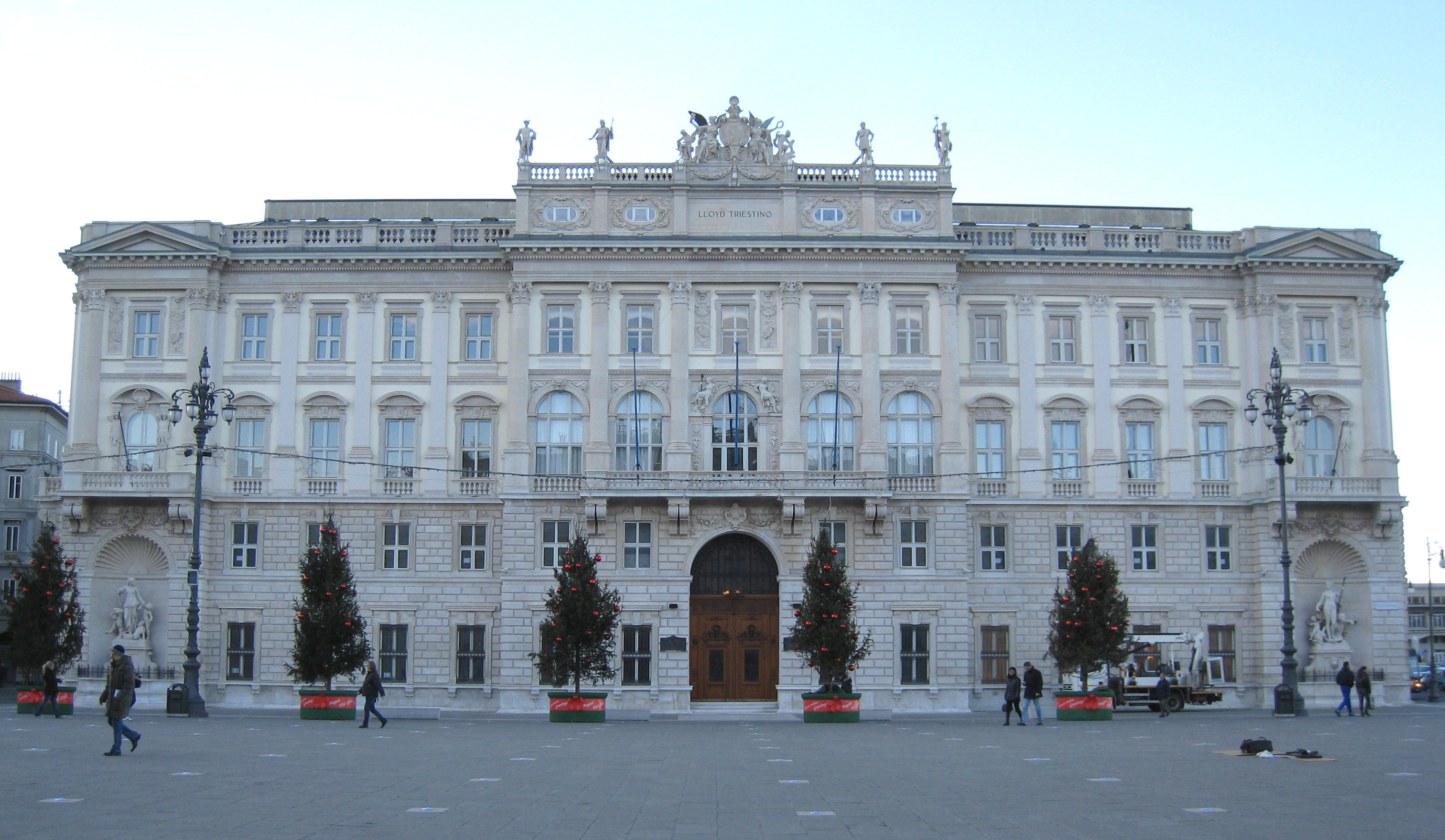
The seat of the regional government in Trieste

A special Italian statute of 31 January 1963 effective 16 February 1963 constituted Friuli-Venezia Giulia as an autonomous region within the Italian Republic.

The President of Regional Government is the region's head of government. Executive power is exercised by the Regional Government of Friuli-Venezia Giulia and legislative power is vested in both the government and the Regional Council. In the latest regional election, which took place on 4 March 2018, Massimiliano Fedriga of the Lega Nord Friuli-Venezia Giulia was elected president by a landslide.

=== Administrative divisions ===
Like most of the rest of Italy, Friuli-Venezia Giulia was previously divided into four provinces: Gorizia, Pordenone, Trieste and Udine. They were abolished on 30 September 2017, with the first three immediately ceasing activity, while the province of Udine remained active until 22 April 2018. In 2019, they were all reactivated as "regional decentralization entities" (Italian: Enti di decentramento regionale, or EDR) beginning on 1 July 2020.

In anticipation of this 2017 and 2018 abolition of the provinces in Friuli-Venezia Giulia, the Regional Council created a system of 18 Intermunicipal Territorial Unions (Italian: Unioni territoriali intercomunali, or UTI). The UTIs progressively took on the local services that the municipalities previously managed, extending across the larger area managed by each UTI, while also taking on some responsibilities previously managed by the provinces; this handling of "wide area local development policies" by the UTIs was conceived as a way allow more focused planning and budgeting for the 215 comuni, divided across the 18 UTIs, than would be possible on a region-wide basis by the Regional Council. However, activity of UTIs was discontinued after the reactivation of former provinces.

The Regional Council also passed a statute which allows, should it desire at some future point, for the establishment of the regional capital of Trieste—with smaller surrounding towns—as a metropolitan city administering wide area local development policies.

==== Intermunicipal Territorial Unions (UTI) ====
	UTI name	Seat	Former province	Constituent comuni	Number of comuni	Area (km^{2})	Population
a	UTI Giuliana	Trieste	TS	Duino-Aurisina, Monrupino, Muggia, San Dorligo della Valle, Sgonico, Trieste	6	212.5	232,601
b	UTI Carso Isonzo Adriatico	Monfalcone	GO	Doberdò del Lago, Grado, Fogliano Redipuglia, Monfalcone, Ronchi dei Legionari, Sagrado, San Canzian d'Isonzo, San Pier d'Isonzo, Staranzano, Turriaco	10	264.8	72,499
c	UTI Collio - Alto Isonzo	Gorizia	GO	Capriva del Friuli, Cormons, Dolegna del Collio, Farra d'Isonzo, Gorizia, Gradisca d'Isonzo, Mariano del Friuli, Medea, Moraro, Mossa, Romans d'Isonzo, San Floriano del Collio, San Lorenzo Isontino, Savogna d'Isonzo, Villesse	15	202.3	67,644
d	UTI del Canal del Ferro - Val Canale	Tarvisio	UD	Chiusaforte, Dogna, Malborghetto-Valbruna, Moggio Udinese, Pontebba, Resia, Resiutta, Tarvisio	8	885.0	11,164
e	UTI del Gemonese	Gemona del Friuli	UD	Artegna, Bordano, Gemona del Friuli, Montenars, Trasaghis, Venzone	6	235.3	19,893
f	UTI della Carnia	Tolmezzo	UD	Amaro, Ampezzo, Arta Terme, Cavazzo Carnico, Cercivento, Comeglians, Enemonzo, Forni Avoltri, Forni di Sopra, Forni di Sotto, Lauco, Ovaro, Paluzza, Paularo, Prato Carnico, Preone, Ravascletto, Raveo, Rigolato, Sappada, Sauris, Socchieve, Sutrio, Tolmezzo, Treppo Ligosullo, Verzegnis, Villa Santina, Zuglio	28	1,286	39,882
g	UTI del Friuli Centrale	Udine	UD	Campoformido, Martignacco, Pagnacco, Pasian di Prato, Pavia di Udine, Pozzuolo del Friuli, Pradamano, Reana del Rojale, Tavagnacco, Tricesimo, Udine	11	274.1	170,123
h	UTI del Torre	Tarcento	UD	Attimis, Cassacco, Faedis, Lusevera, Magnano in Riviera, Nimis, Povoletto, Taipana, Tarcento	9	326.4	36,651
i	UTI Mediofriuli	Codroipo	UD	Basiliano, Bertiolo, Camino al Tagliamento, Castions di Strada, Codroipo, Lestizza, Mereto di Tomba, Mortegliano, Sedegliano, Talmassons, Varmo	11	419.6	51,812
j	UTI Collinare	San Daniele del Friuli	UD	Buja, Colloredo di Monte Albano, Coseano, Dignano, Fagagna, Flaibano, Forgaria nel Friuli, Majano, Moruzzo, Osoppo, Ragogna, Rive d'Arcano, San Daniele del Friuli, San Vito di Fagagna, Treppo Grande	15	349.8	51,241
k	UTI del Natisone	Cividale del Friuli	UD	Buttrio, Cividale del Friuli, Corno di Rosazzo, Drenchia, Grimacco, Manzano, Moimacco, Premariacco, Prepotto, Pulfero, Remanzacco, San Giovanni al Natisone, San Leonardo, San Pietro al Natisone, Savogna, Stregna, Torreano	17	456.5	52,112
l	UTI Riviera - Bassa Friulana	Latisana	UD	Carlino, Latisana, Lignano Sabbiadoro, Marano Lagunare, Muzzana del Turgnano, Palazzolo dello Stella, Pocenia, Porpetto, Precenicco, Rivignano Teor, Ronchis, San Giorgio di Nogaro	12	438.4	56,332
m	UTI Agro Aquileiese	Cervignano del Friuli	UD	Aiello del Friuli, Aquileia, Bagnaria Arsa, Bicinicco, Campolongo Tapogliano, Cervignano del Friuli, Chiopris-Viscone, Fiumicello Villa Vicentina, Gonars, Palmanova, Ruda, San Vito al Torre, Santa Maria la Longa, Torviscosa, Terzo di Aquileia, Trivignano Udinese, Visco	17	298.7	55,148
n	UTI del Tagliamento	San Vito al Tagliamento	PN	Casarsa della Delizia, Cordovado, Morsano al Tagliamento, San Giorgio della Richinvelda, San Martino al Tagliamento, San Vito al Tagliamento, Sesto al Reghena, Spilimbergo, Valvasone Arzene	9	334.3	57,278
o	UTI delle Valli e delle Dolomiti Friulane	Maniago	PN	Andreis, Arba, Barcis, Castelnovo del Friuli, Cavasso Nuovo, Cimolais, Claut, Clauzetto, Erto e Casso, Fanna, Frisanco, Maniago, Meduno, Montereale Valcellina, Pinzano al Tagliamento, Sequals, Tramonti di Sopra, Tramonti di Sotto, Travesio, Vajont, Vito d'Asio, Vivaro	22	1,148.1	37,086
p	UTI Livenza - Cansiglio - Cavallo	Sacile	PN	Aviano, Brugnera, Budoia, Caneva, Polcenigo, Sacile	6	304.0	50,408
q	UTI Sile e Meduna	Azzano Decimo	PN	Azzano Decimo, Chions, Fiume Veneto, Pasiano di Pordenone, Prata di Pordenone, Pravisdomini	6	205.3	51,993
r	UTI del Noncello	Pordenone	PN	Cordenons, Fontanafredda, Porcia, Pordenone, Roveredo in Piano, San Quirino, Zoppola	7	283.6	114,046

Map of the Unione territoriale intercomunale of Friuli-Venezia Giulia; letters correspond to those in leftmost column of the table above.

==== Regional decentralization entities ====
Former provinces of Friuli-Venezia Giulia, now EDRs

Municipalities (comuni) of Friuli-Venezia Giulia

Until 2017–18, Friuli-Venezia Giulia was divided into four provinces. The Regional Council voted to abolish them effective 30 September 2017, although the provincial council of the largest, Udine, carried on some administrative responsibilities until 22 April 2018. They have again been active since 1 July 2020 under the administrative form of regional decentralization entities or EDRs.

EDR	Population (2026)	Area (km^{2})	Density (inh./km^{2})	Municipalities
Gorizia	138,717	467.14	296.9	25
Pordenone	311,114	2,275.42	136.7	50
Trieste	227,840	212.51	1,072.1	6
Udine	515,825	4,969.30	103.8	134

== Culture ==
=== Language ===
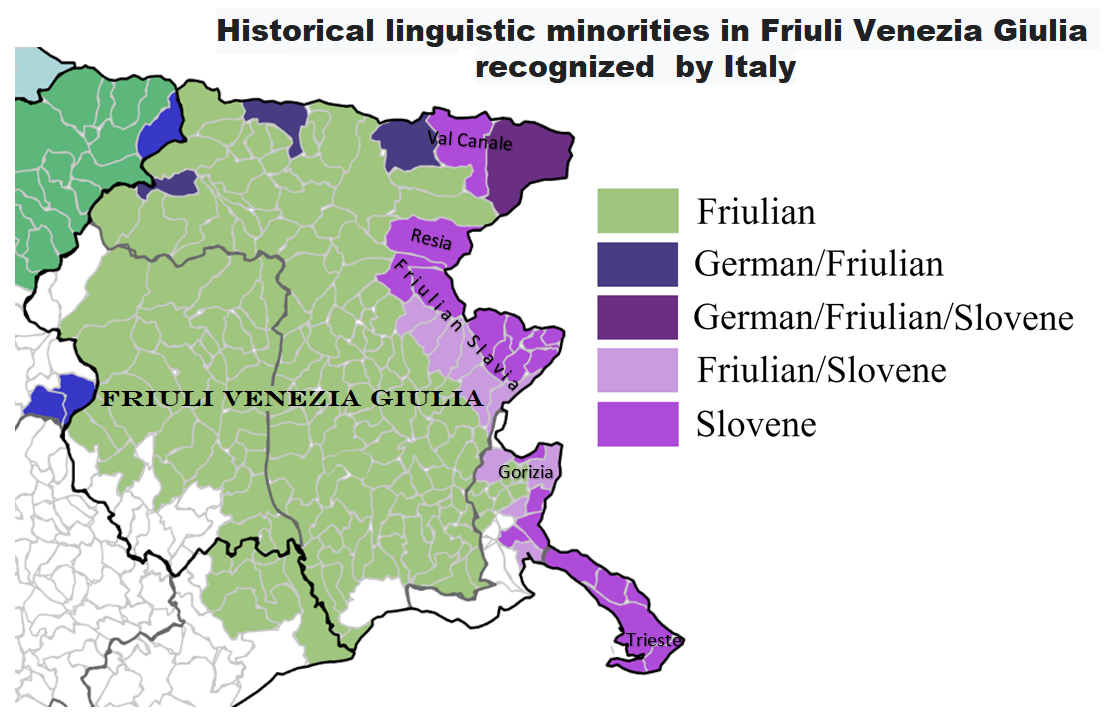
A map of linguistic minorities in Friuli-Venezia Giulia; areas in white are historically Venetian speaking.

The official languages of the region are Italian, Friulian, Slovene and German.

Italian is the official national language. Friulian language is also spoken in most of the region—with a few exceptions, most notably Trieste and the area around Monfalcone and Grado, where a version of the Venetian language and Triestine dialect is spoken instead.

Venetian is also spoken in western part of the Province of Pordenone, and in the city of Pordenone itself, due to its proximity with the Veneto region. Friulian and Venetian are more common in the countryside, while standard Italian is the predominant language in the larger towns (Udine, Pordenone, Gorizia). The region is also home to Italy's Slovene-speaking minority.

=== Historical flag ===
A very popular symbol among the Friulian community (mostly identified with the Friulian-speaking population in the provinces of Udine, Pordenone and Gorizia and the numerous expat communities around the world) is the Friulian Historical Flag, to which the official regional flag is roughly inspired, being somehow a modern interpretation of it. The official, modern "Friuli-Venezia Giulia" flag logo was issued in 1967–1968 (and adopted in 2001) to represent the region which in 1963 took the administrative setup of today. The historical symbol of the eagle dates back to (at least) the 13th century, the time of the Patriarchate of Aquileia.

== Economy ==
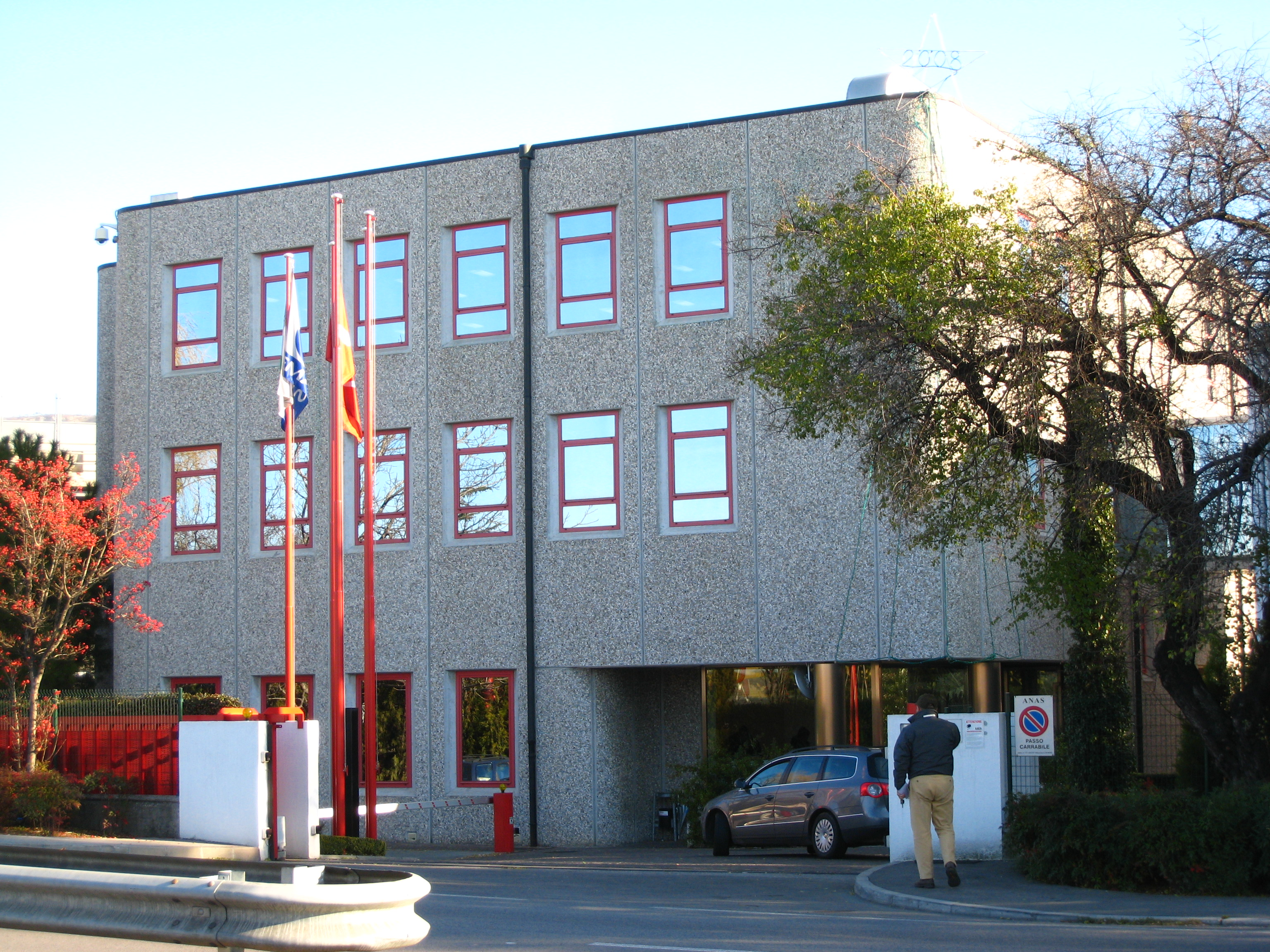
Illy headquartiers in Trieste

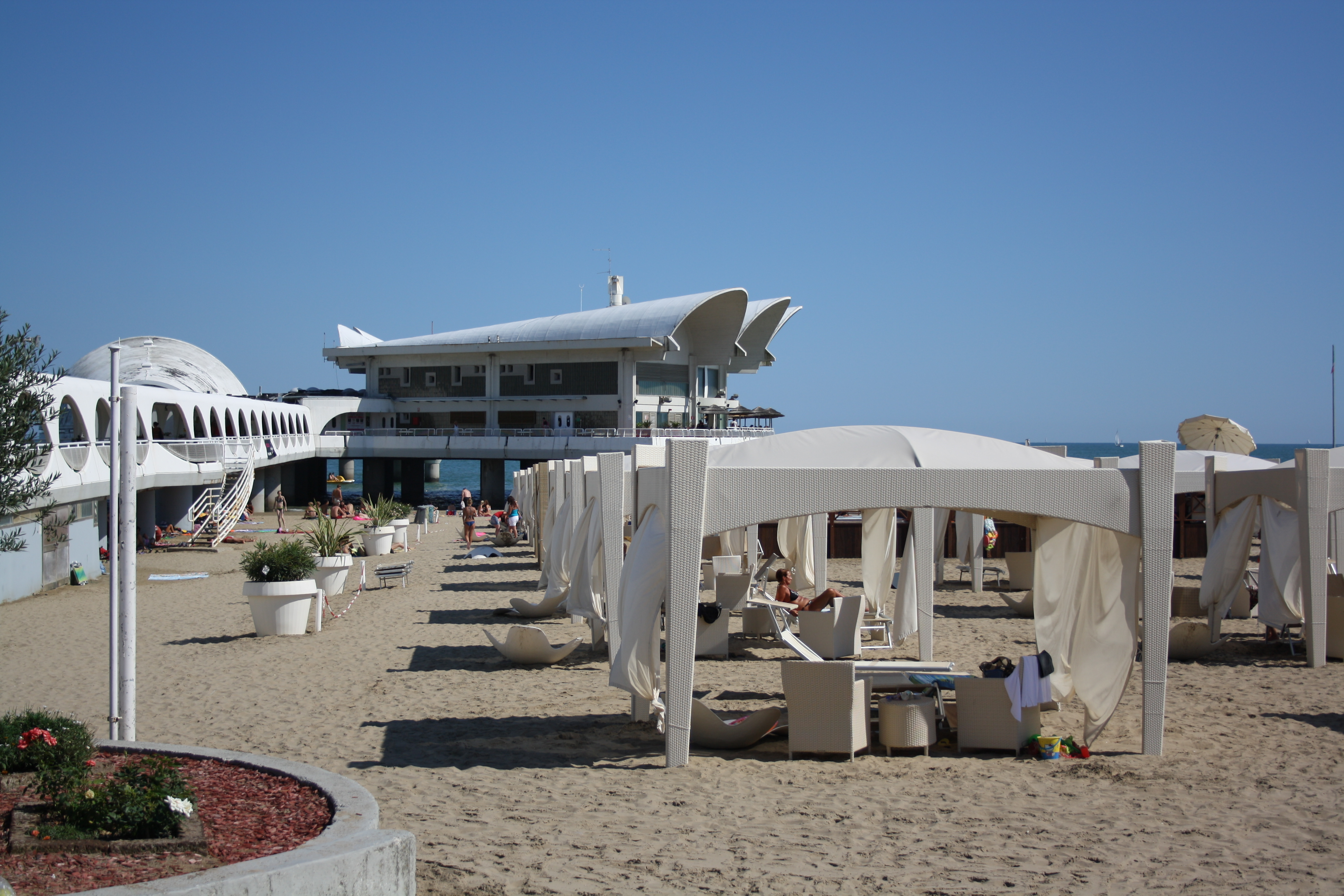
Beach in Lignano Sabbiadoro

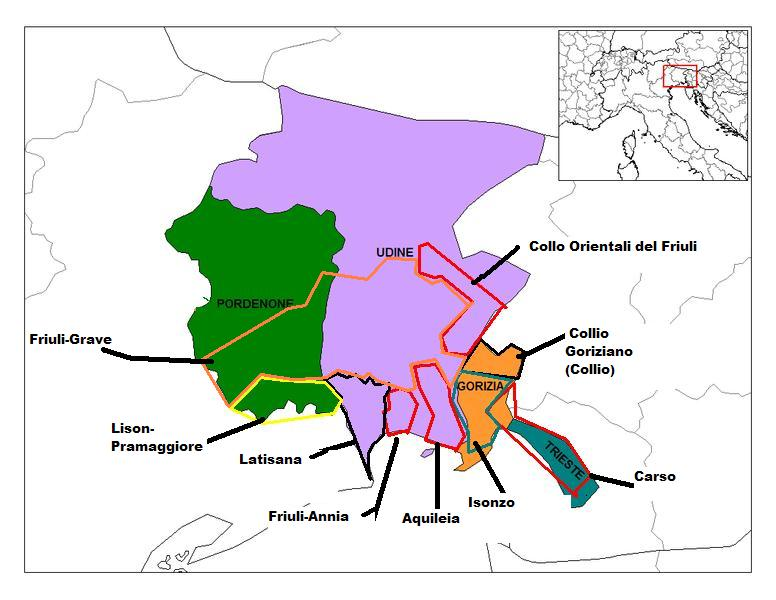
Approximate location of the wine regions of the Friuli-Venezia Giulia

The Gross domestic product (GDP) of the region was 38 billion euros in 2018, accounting for 2.2% of Italy's economic output. GDP per capita adjusted for purchasing power was 31,200 euros or 103% of the EU27 average in the same year. The GDP per employee was 106% of the EU average.

The economy of Friuli-Venezia Giulia is one of Italy's most successful. Its core is based on small and middle-size enterprises (the so-called "North-East model"), on specialized farming and on high-quality tourism with a significant inclination towards exports.

Agriculture and farming maintain an essential role in the economy of the region and employed in 2001 around 95,000 persons. Its products are exported not only within the country and Europe (fruit and vegetables, cheese) but have become known worldwide for their acclaimed quality (cured ham and wines, especially white ones). Noteworthy is also the production of soy (third producer in Italy with more than 37,000 hectares cultivated in 2000) and timber production in Carnia.

The economy of the region is based on a widespread mosaic of small and medium-sized enterprises; of particular importance are the four industrial districts where a multitude of highly specialised enterprises are concentrated. These districts are centred around the towns of Manzano, San Daniele del Friuli (cured ham), Maniago (knives), and Brugnera (furniture). Several large enterprises are also present in the region in both the industry and services sectors. Some of these companies are world leaders in their relevant sectors; such are Fincantieri (headquarters in Trieste with shipyards in Monfalcone) for the construction of the world's largest cruise ships, Zanussi-Electrolux (Pordenone) in the production of electrical appliances, Danieli, Eurotech, Illy, Rizzani de Eccher, Solari di Udine, TBS Group, Banca Generali, Genertellife, Italia Marittima, Telit, Wärtsilä, Allianz Italia and Assicurazioni Generali in Trieste, a leading insurance company in the world.

Friuli-Venezia Giulia wine (or Friuli wine) is wine made in the northeastern Italian region of Friuli-Venezia Giulia. There are 11 denominazione di origine controllata (DOC) and 3 denominazione di origine controllata e garantita (DOCG) in the Friuli-Venezia Giulia area. The region has 3 indicazione geografica tipica (IGT) designations Alto Livenza, delle Venezie and Venezia Giulia. Nearly 62% of the wine produced in the region falls under a DOC designation. The area is known predominantly for its white wines, which are considered some of the best examples of Italian wine in that style. Along with the Veneto and Trentino-Alto Adige, the Friuli-Venezia Giulia forms the Tre Venezie wine region, which ranks with Tuscany and Piedmont as Italy's world class wine regions.

In the services sector, the city of Trieste plays a leading role (with knock-on effects on the other provincial capitals); it is here that activities such as the regional government, large banking, and insurance companies are concentrated. The unemployment rate stood at 5.7% in 2020.

Friuli-Venezia Giulia has many small and picturesque villages, 13 of them have been selected by I Borghi più belli d'Italia (English: The most beautiful Villages of Italy), a non-profit private association of small Italian towns of strong historical and artistic interest, that was founded on the initiative of the Tourism Council of the National Association of Italian Municipalities. These villages are:

- Clauiano
- Cordovado
- Fagagna
- Gradisca d'Isonzo
- Palmanova
- Poffabro
- Polcenigo
- Sappada
- Sesto al Reghena
- Strassoldo
- Toppo
- Valvasone Arzene
- Venzone

== Transport ==
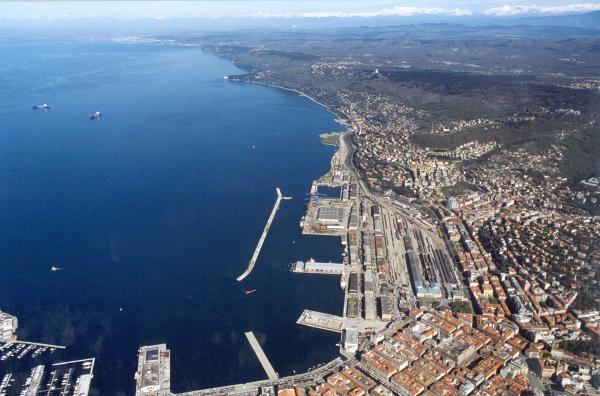
The port of Trieste

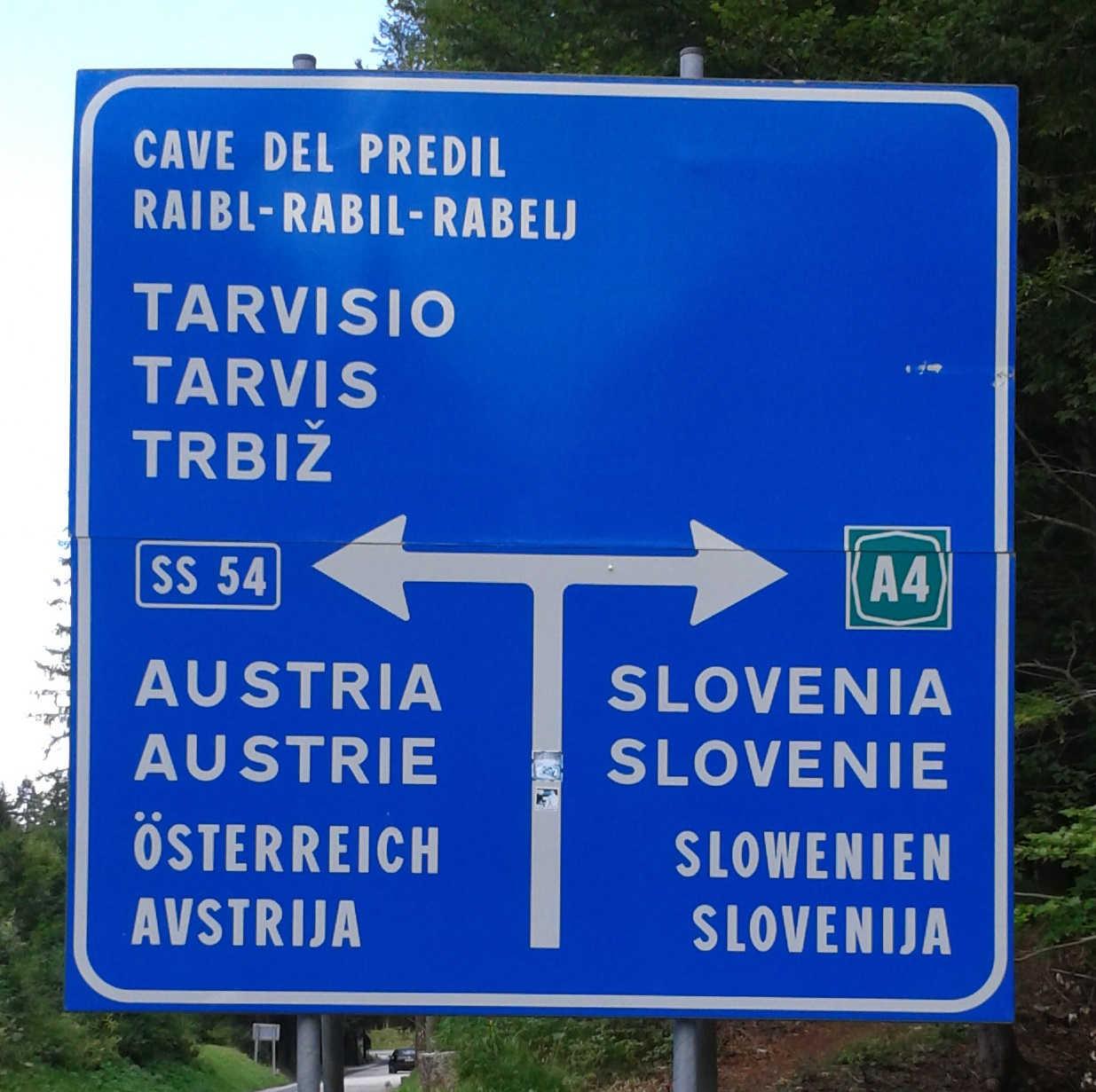
A traffic sign in Italian, Friulan, German and Slovene

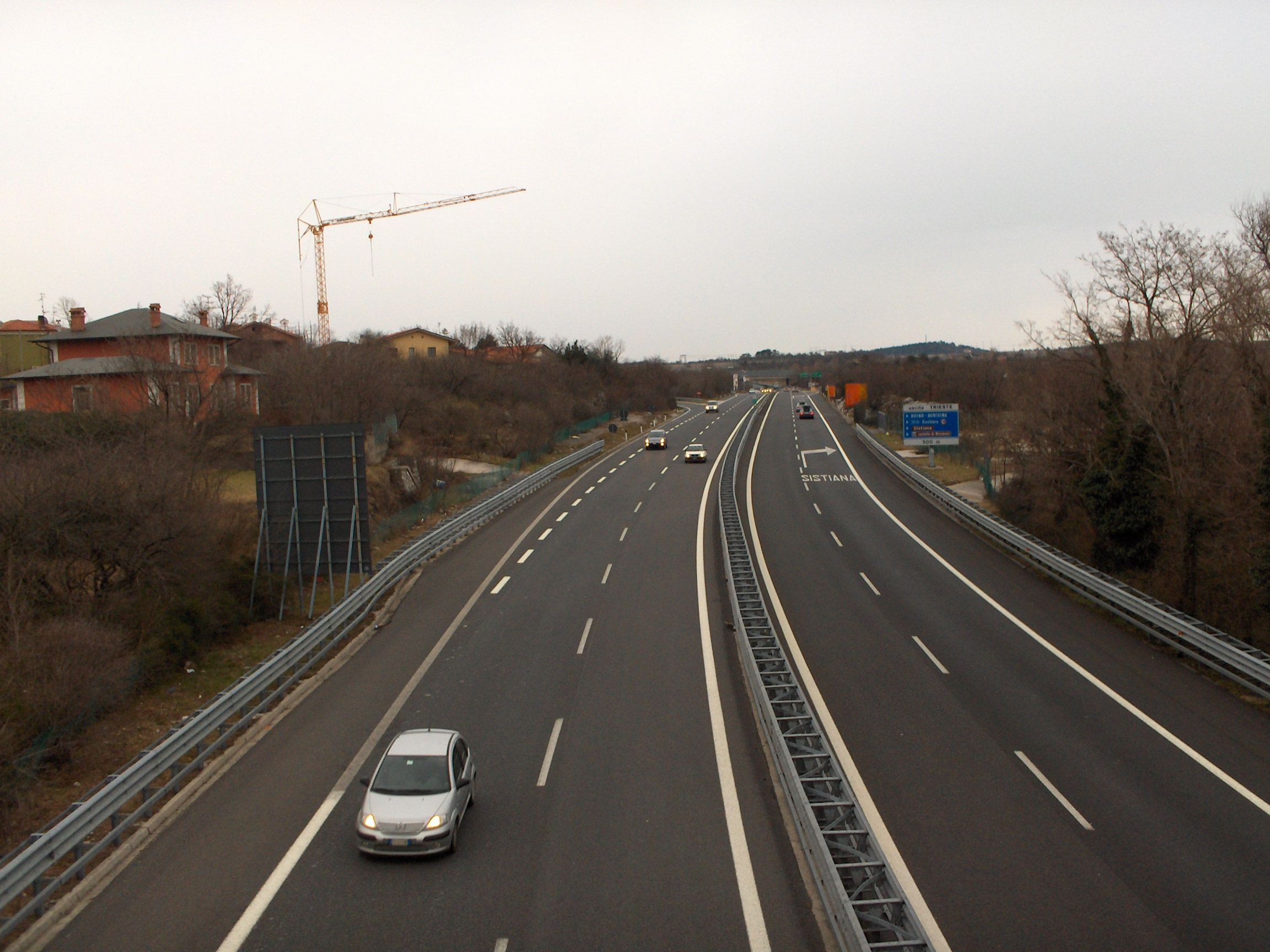
Autostrada A4 near Sistiana

With its commercial Free Port, Trieste also plays an essential role in the trade sector: special custom regulations ensure exclusive financial conditions to operators. The Port of Trieste is today the most important centre worldwide for the trade of coffee and plays a strategic key role in trade with northern and eastern Europe.

Although small in size, Friuli-Venezia Giulia has always been 'in the centre of Europe' and has played an important role in connecting Italy (and the Mediterranean) to Central and Eastern Europe. Its role will become even more strategic as a logistical platform with the imminent enlargement of the European Union. Hence the importance of the infrastructure network of the region, which can today be considered first-rate in quality and diversity. The motorway network consists of more than 200 km that runs from North to South and from West to East, connecting the region to Austria and Slovenia.

The railway network consists of around 500 km of track, with the two twin-line 'backbones' Venice-Trieste and Trieste-Udine-Tarvisio-Austria. The motorway and railway networks are linked to the ports of Trieste, Monfalcone, and Porto Nogaro, the three most northerly ports of the Mediterranean. Trieste, in particular, has a free port for goods since 1719. It is the Italian port with the greatest capacity for covered storage, with a surface area of more than 2 million square meters and 70 km of rail tracks. Intermodality is guaranteed by the Cervignano terminal, in operation since 1988, to serve the increasing commercial traffic between Italy and Eastern European countries.

The region is served by Trieste Airport which provides direct routes to other parts of Italy and Europe. The airport is located near Ronchi dei Legionari and is 38 km (24 mi) north west of Trieste. Other airports such as Venice Marco Polo Airport and Ljubljana Airport are also used by air travellers from the region.

The region is now placing much of its hopes for future economic development in the construction of a high-speed European Transport Corridor n° V connecting Lyon, Turin, Venice, Trieste, Ljubljana, Budapest, and Kyiv, so as to improve the traffic of goods and services with new EU partners.

== Gallery ==
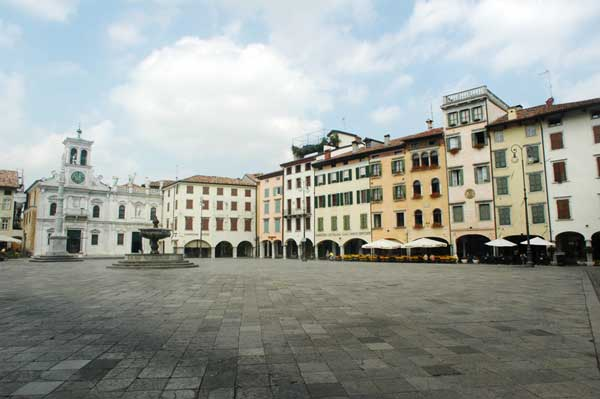
Piazza San Giacomo in Udine

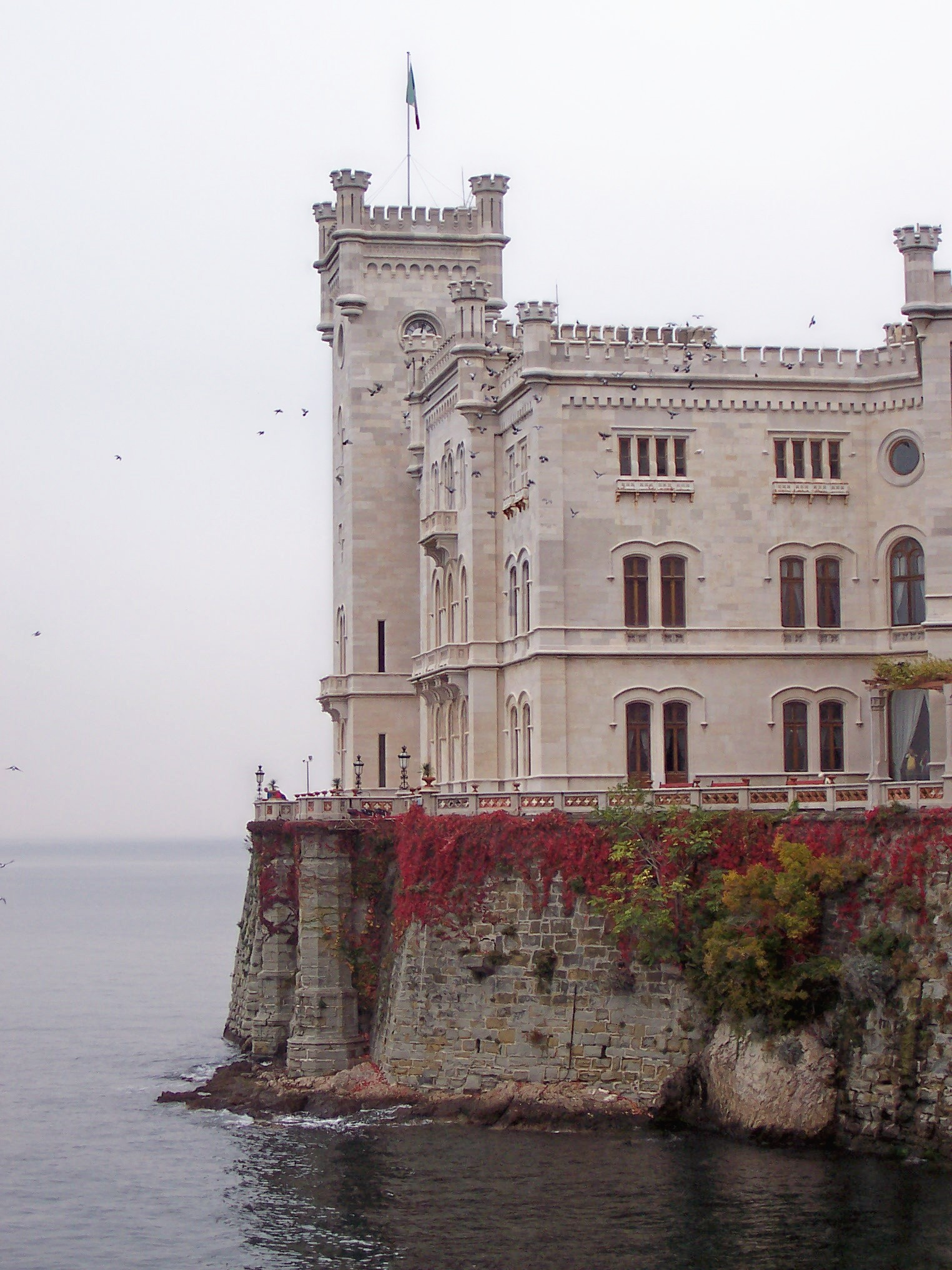
The Miramare Castle in Trieste

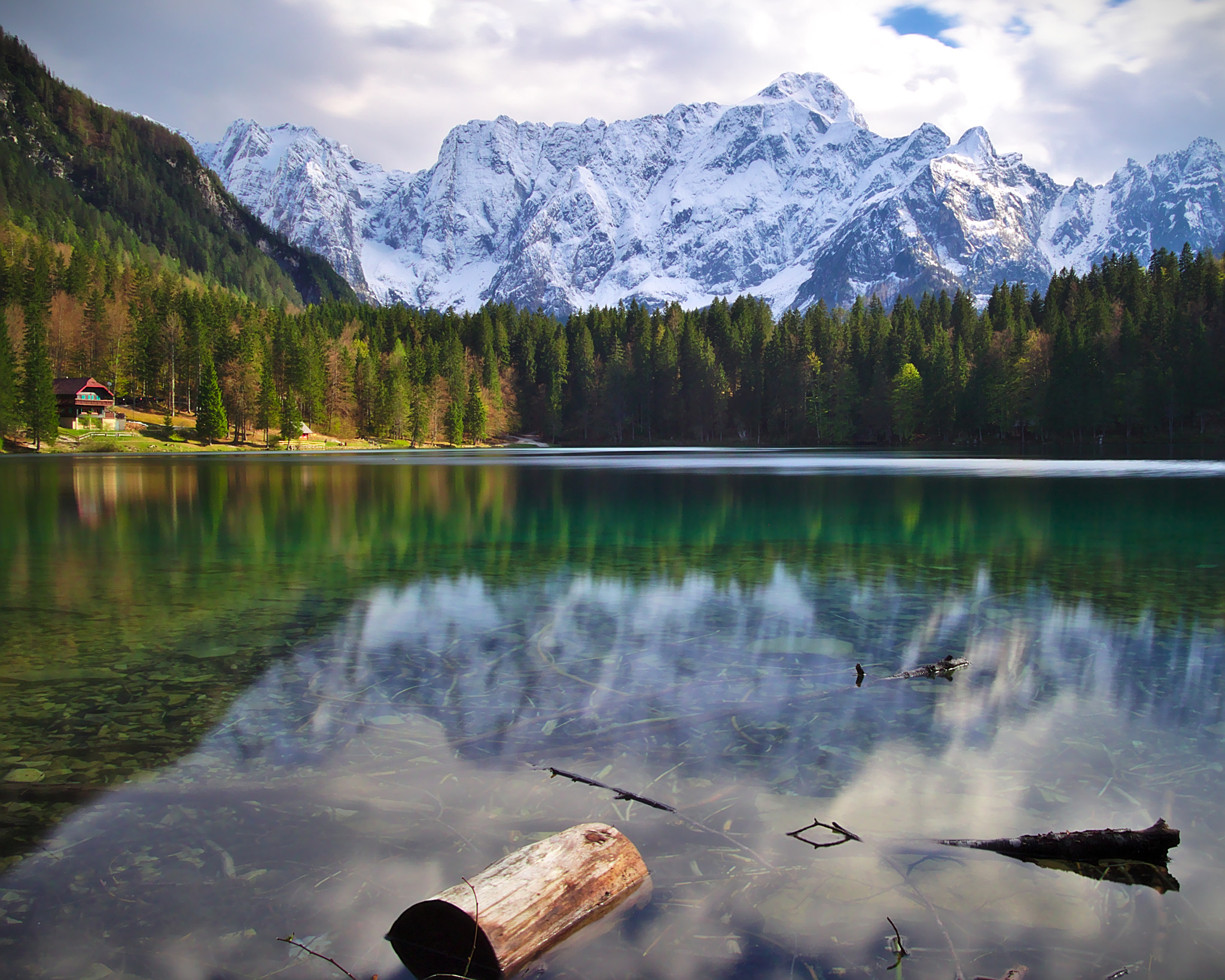
The lake of Fusine in Valromana

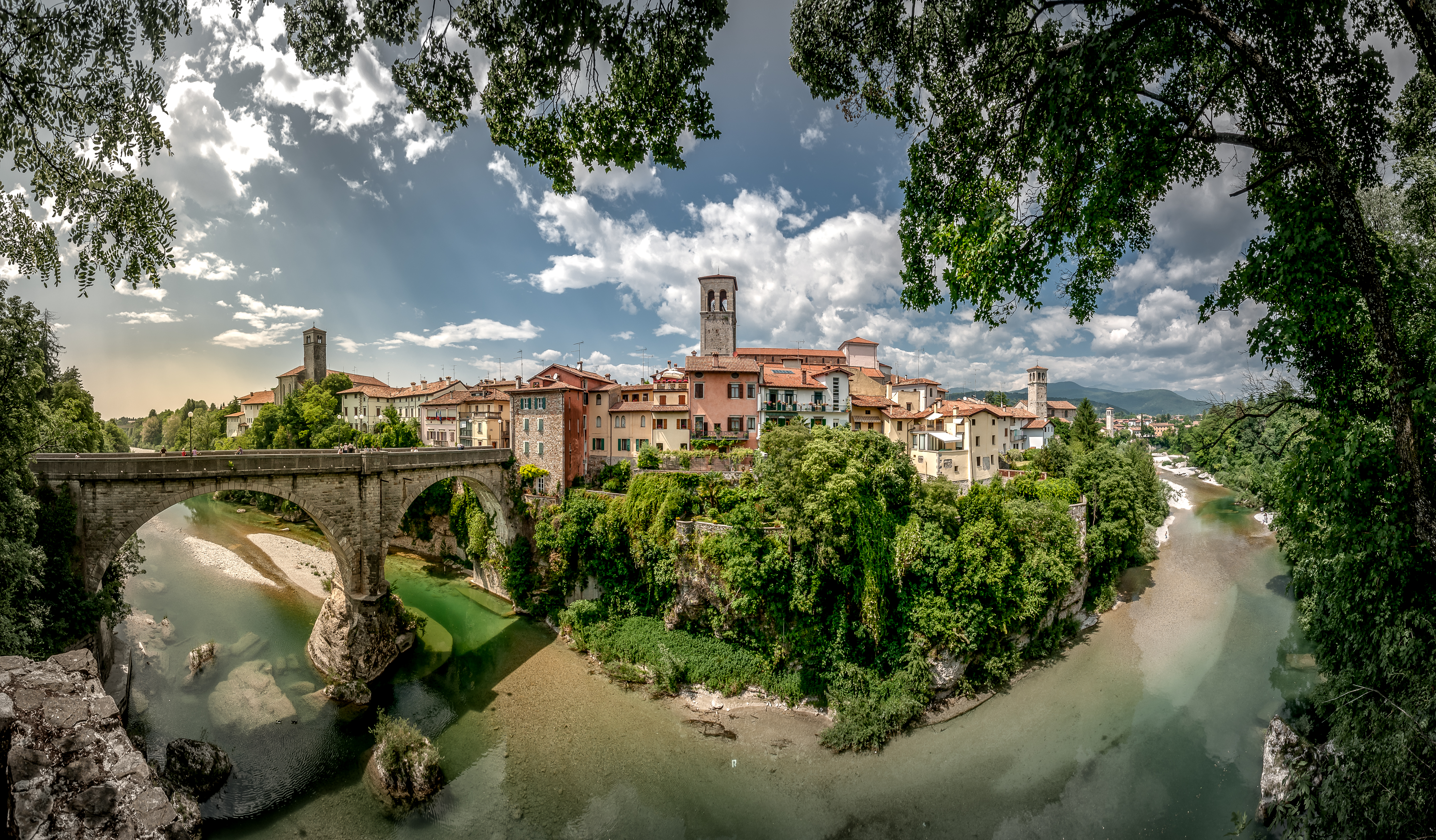
The Devil's Bridge in Cividale del Friuli

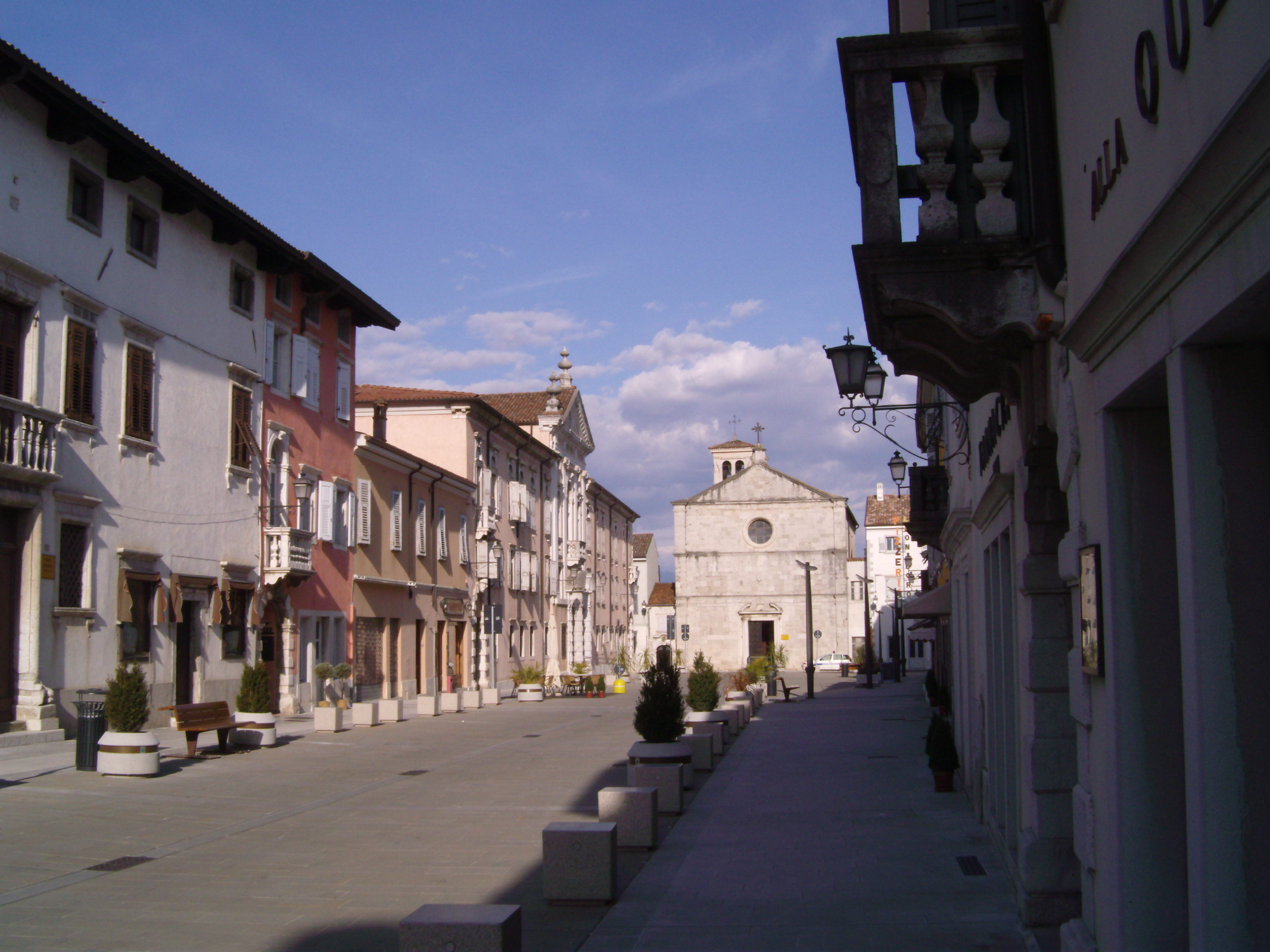
Gradisca d'Isonzo

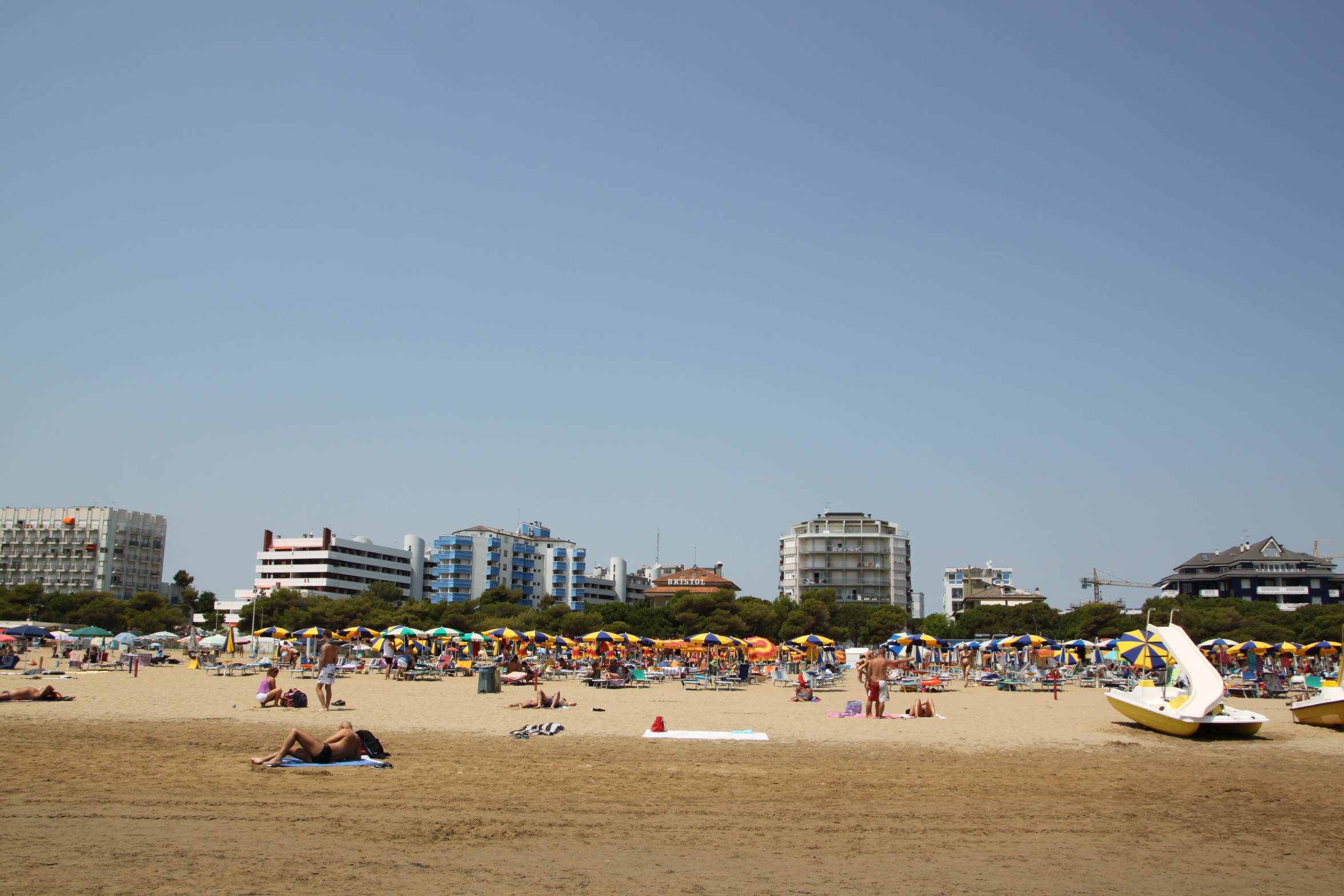
Beach in Lignano Sabbiadoro

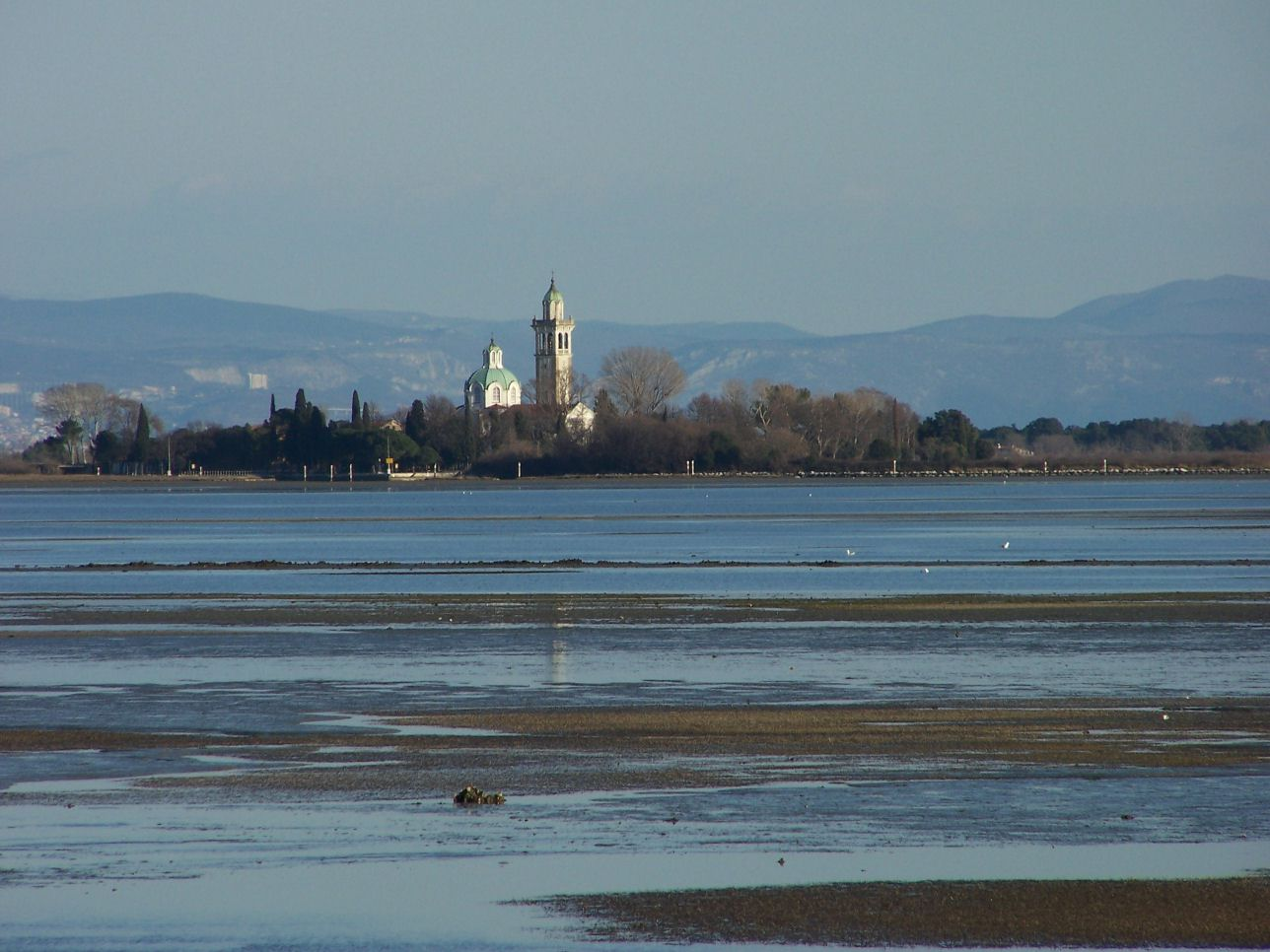
The Grado Lagoon

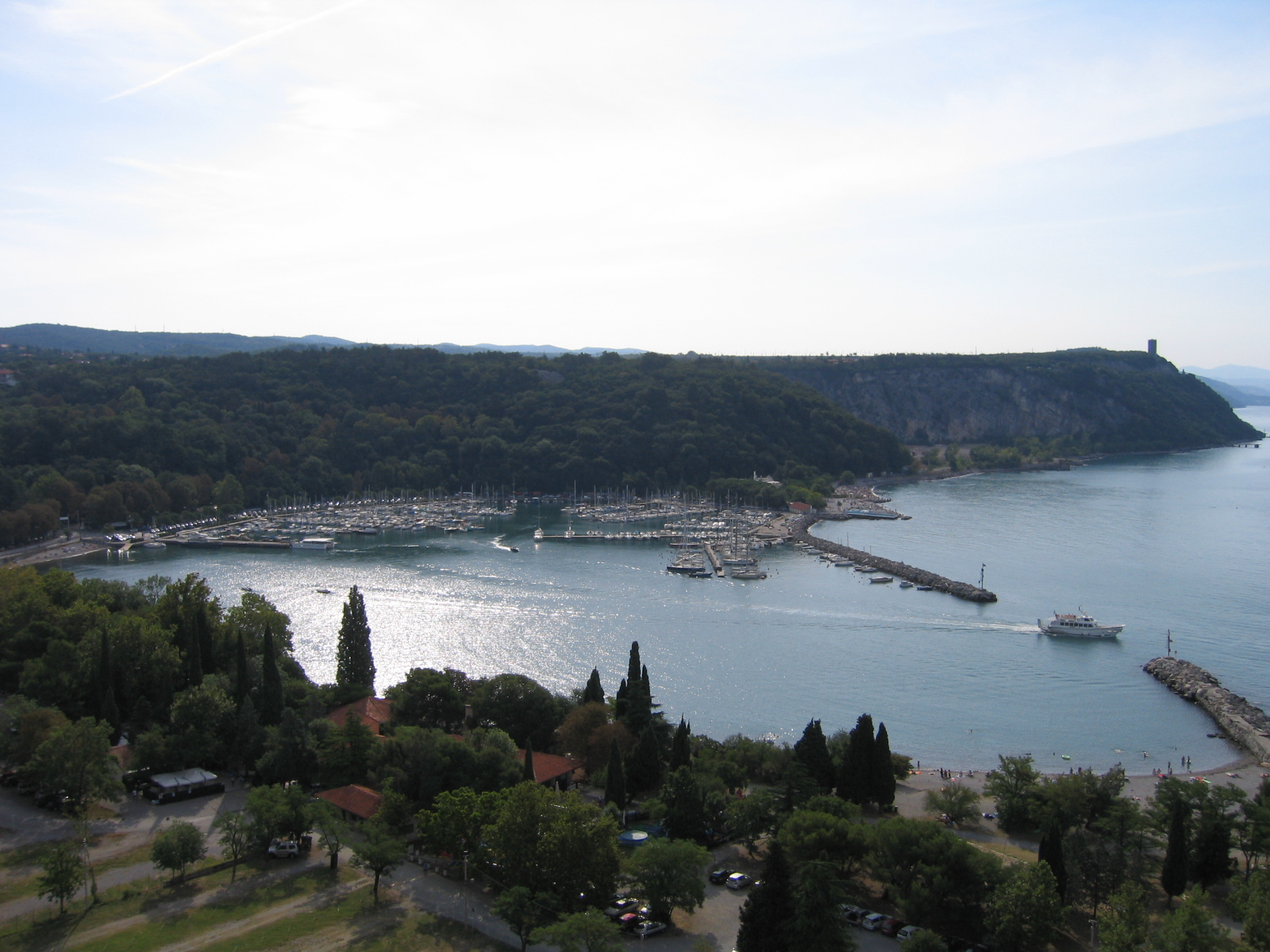
The bay of Sistiana

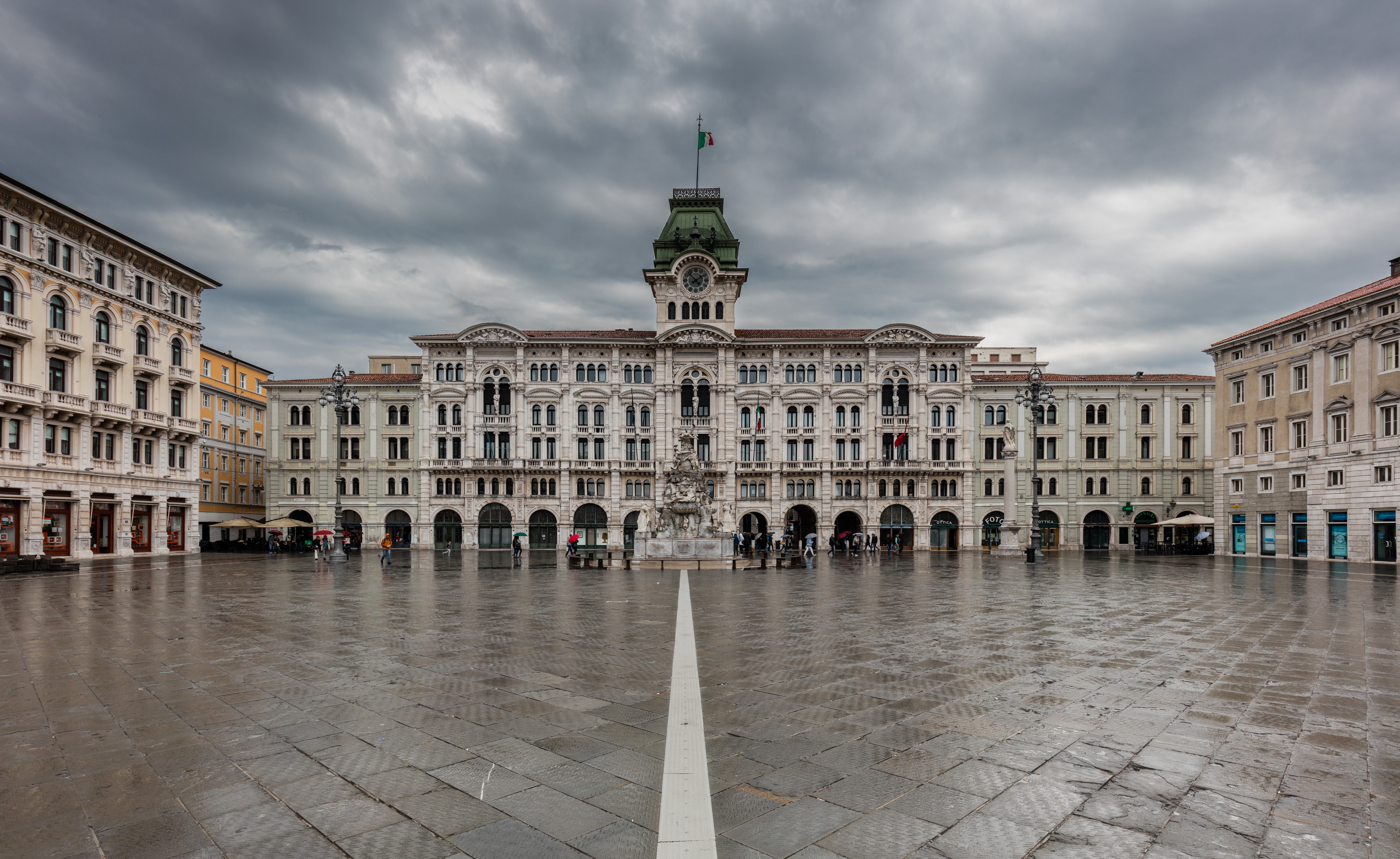
Piazza Unità d'Italia in Trieste

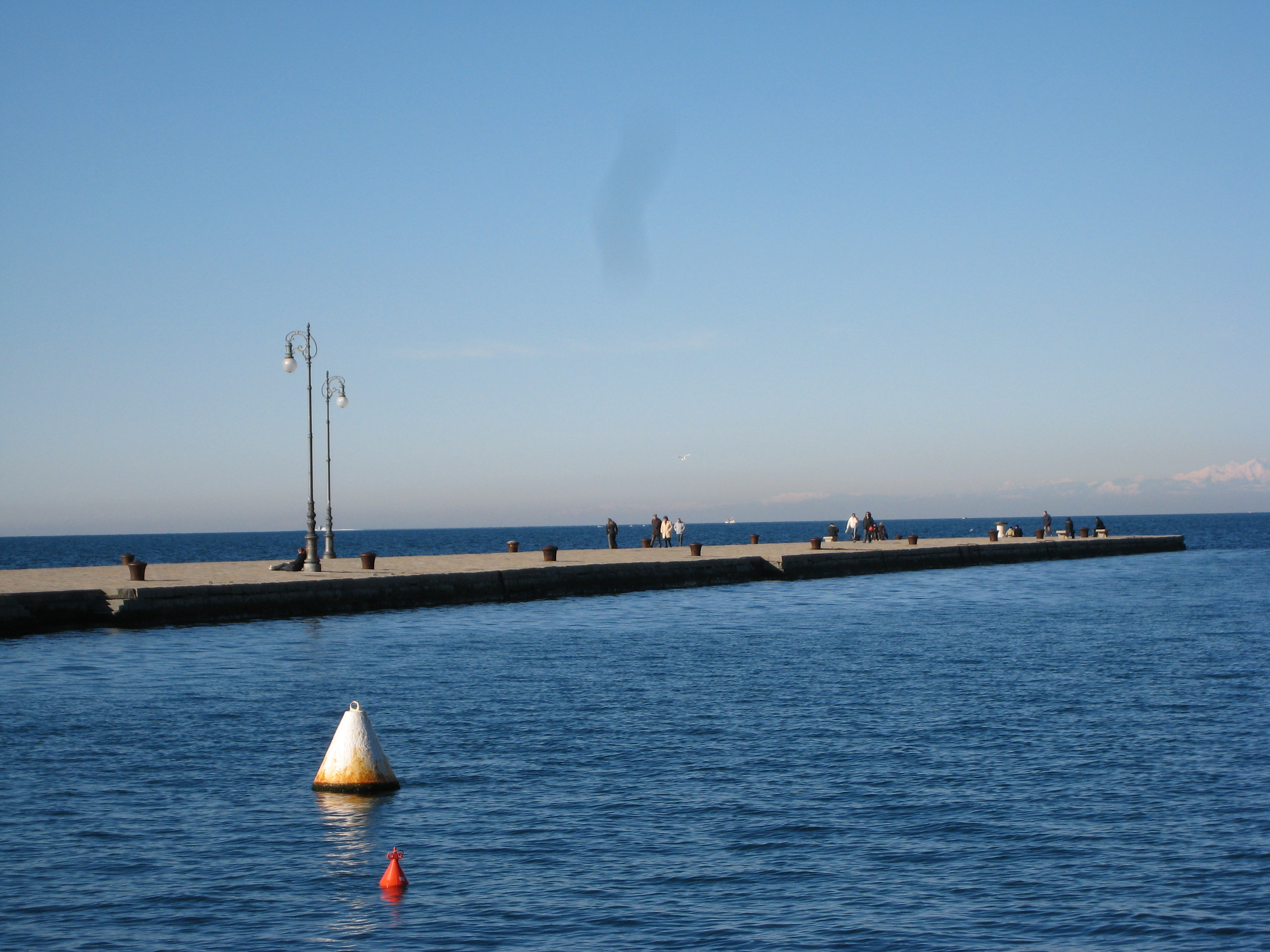
The sea in Trieste

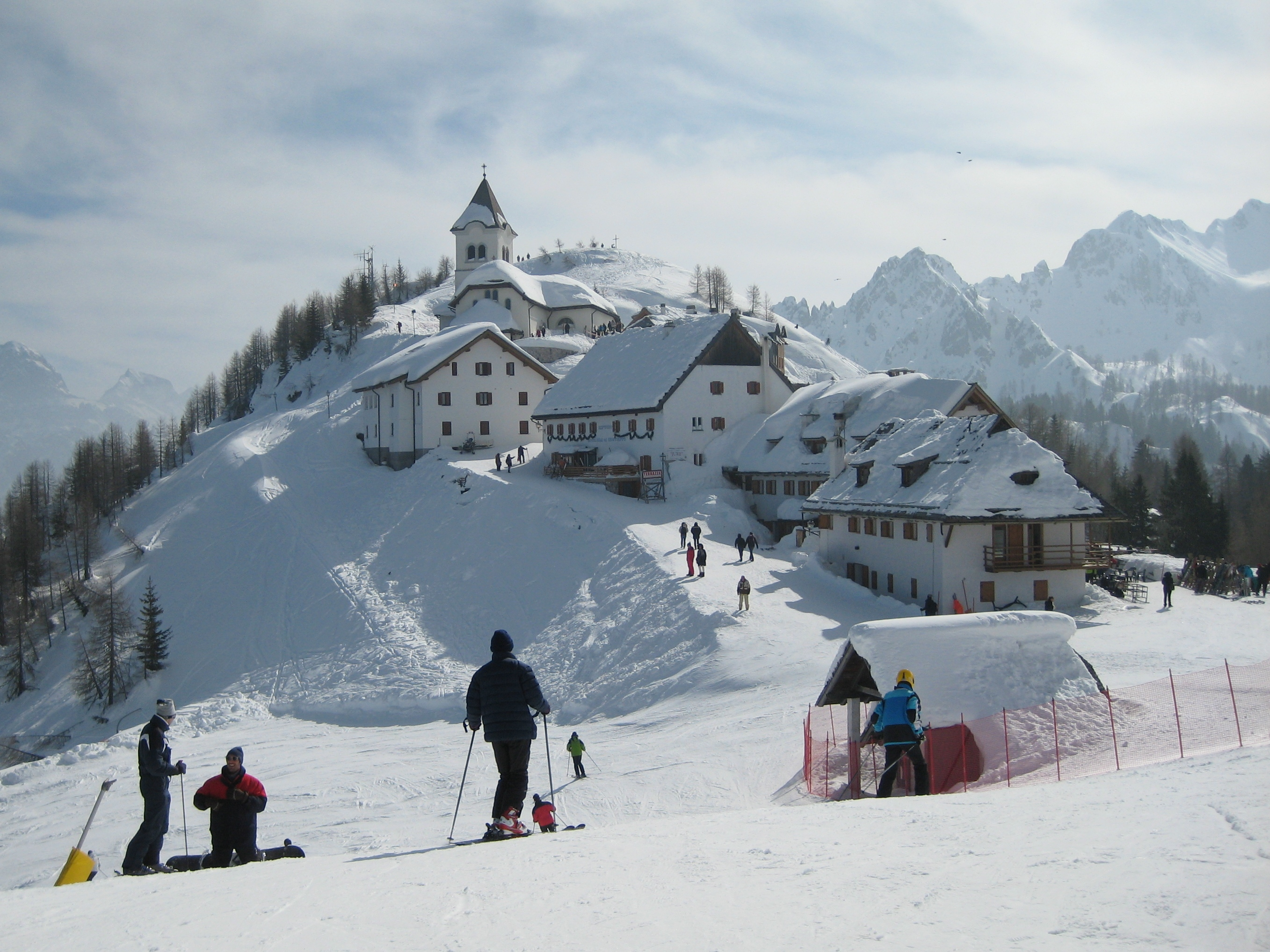
Sanctuary in Mount Lussari, Tarvisio

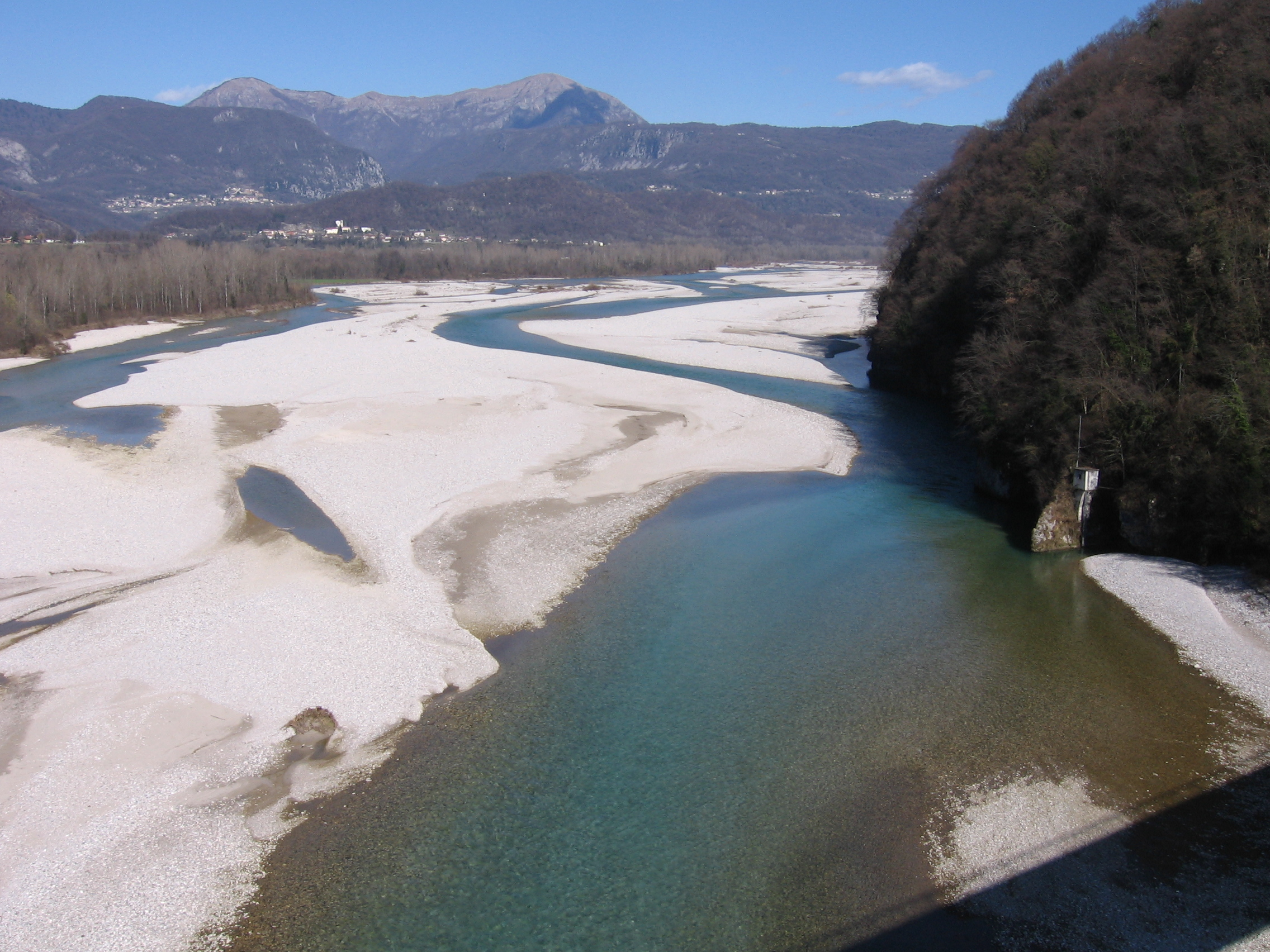
The Tagliamento river near Pinzano

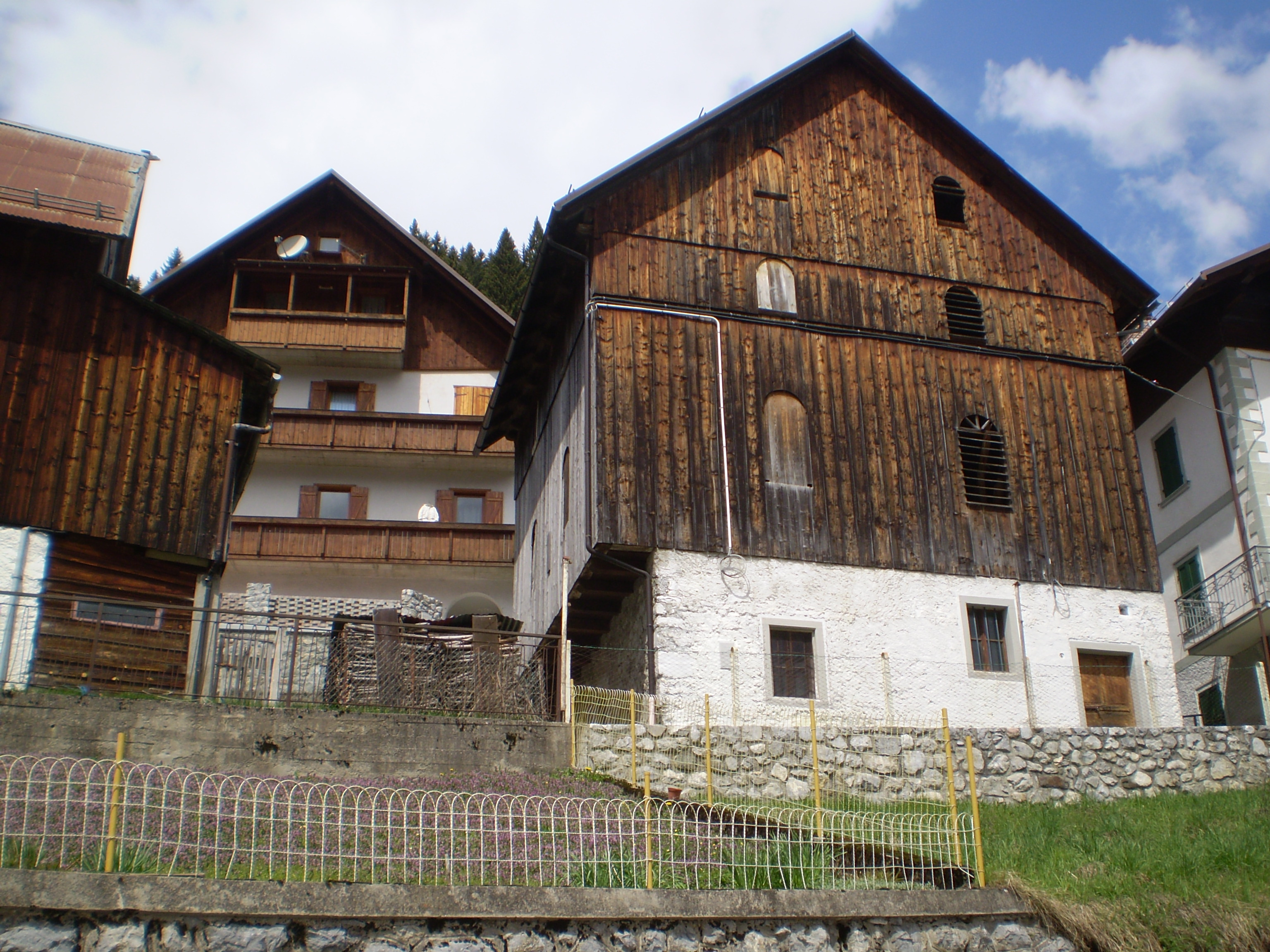
Typical houses in Carnia

== See also ==
- List of museums in Friuli-Venezia Giulia
- Music of Friuli-Venezia Giulia
