= List of museums in Friuli-Venezia Giulia =

This is a list of museums in Friuli-Venezia Giulia, Italy.

image	name	description	address	city	coordinates	type
	Miramare	castle in Trieste, Italy	viale Miramare, s.n.c. – Trieste	Trieste	45.7025°N 13.7125°E	Giardino all'italiana English garden castle national museum
	Risiera di San Sabba concentration camp		via Giovanni Palatucci 5	Trieste	45.62083°N 13.78917°E	Nazi concentration camp military museum concentration camp
	Museo Sartorio		Largo Papa Giovanni XXIII, 1 – Trieste	Trieste	45.64621°N 13.76321°E	art museum
	Revoltella Museum		Via Diaz 27 – Trieste	Trieste	45.64694°N 13.76306°E	art museum
	Udine Castle	art museum		Udine	46.0641°N 13.2364°E	art museum
	Kleines Berlin		Via F. Severo, – Trieste	Trieste	45.6556°N 13.7781°E	military museum
	Museo Civico di Storia Naturale di Trieste		Via dei Tominz 4	Trieste	45.64042°N 13.80047°E	museum
	Jewish Museum Carlo e Vera Wagner		Via Del Monte, 5/7 – Trieste	Trieste	45.6491°N 13.775°E	museum
	National Archaeological Museum of Cividale del Friuli	Italian museum of archaeology	Piazza del Duomo, 13 – Cividale del Friuli	Cividale del Friuli	46.0934°N 13.4322°E	national museum
