= Music of Friuli-Venezia Giulia =

The musical fortunes of Friuli-Venezia Giulia (Furlanija – Julijska krajina) are closely tied to its political fortunes over the course of centuries, all having to do with proximity to the great maritime Republic of Venice as well as to the Austro-Hungarian empire and the vicissitudes of being a heavily contested area during the first World War. The vast comings and goings of various ethnic groups through this section of Italy have led to cultural and musical variety for diversity.

Furlana was a dance that was named from Friuli that became very popular in Venice, then was adopted by French royal court and then it spread all over Europe, being used by Johann Sebastian Bach and many other musicians. It could have a Slav origin, though.

The most prominent musical theater in the region was built in 1801 in Trieste and was named the Teatro Giuseppe Verdi in 1901. The city is the site of the Giuseppe Tartini music conservatory. It is also the home base for the internationally acclaimed Trieste Trio chamber music ensemble.

Elsewhere in the region, the province of Gorizia has at least five spacious auditoriums and hosts a number of music events during the year, including the international Rudolfo Lipizer violin competition as well as various popular music festivals. The province of Pordenone hosts an international organ festival and competition as well as sponsoring an event dedicated to the Renaissance organ. Various musical associations in Pordenone include:

- the Vincenzo Colombo Association for Sacred Music;
- the Institute for Music of the Pedemontana;
- the Farandola Cultural Association.

An additional music conservatory, named for Jacopo Tomadini, is located in the city of Udine.
