= Anthem of Friuli =

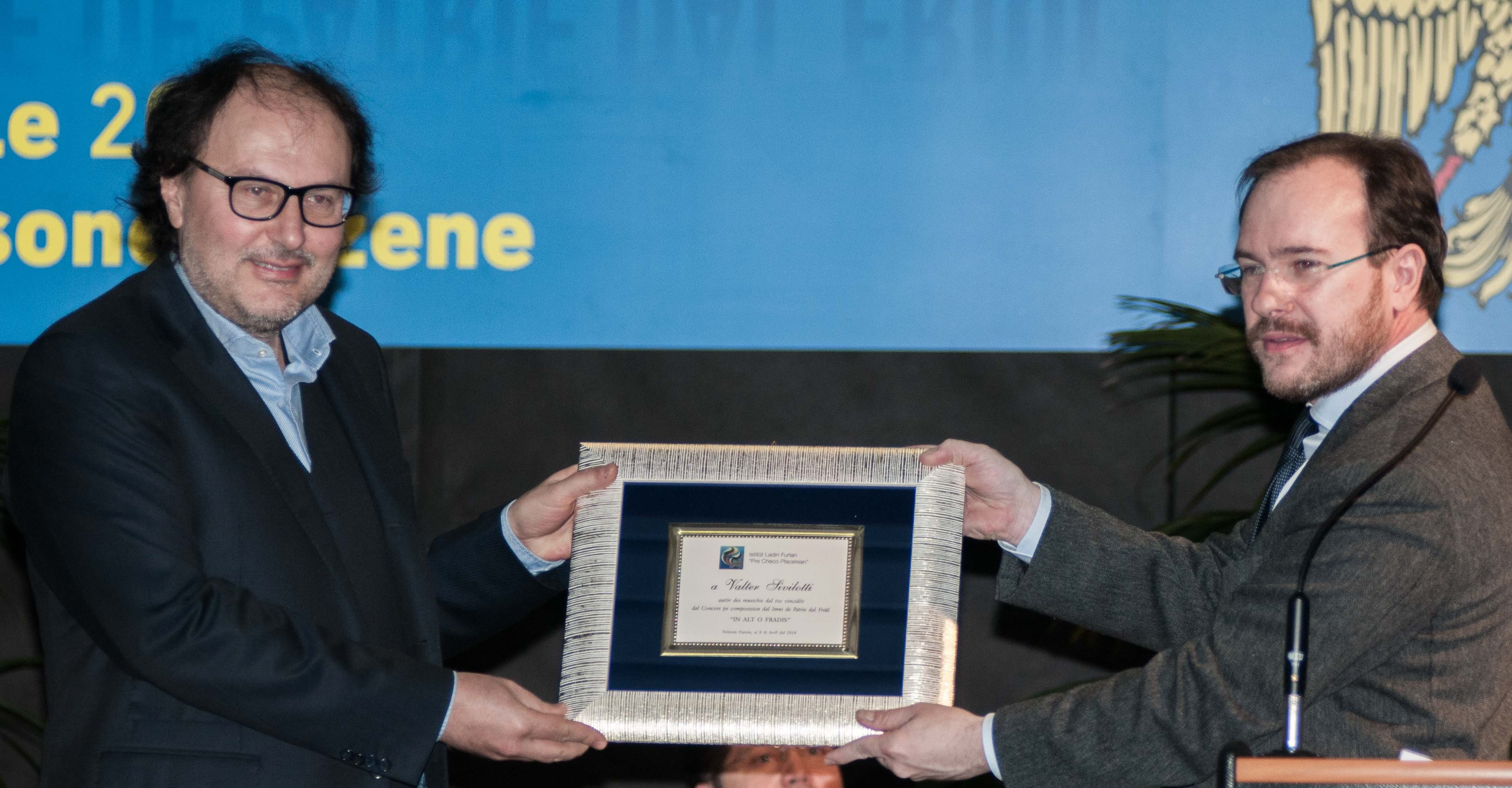
Awarding Maestro Valter Sivilotti during the 2017 Patria del Friuli Festival in Valvasone Arzene

The composition in the Friulian language entitled Incuintri al doman (Towards Tomorrow), written by Renato Stroili Gurisatti and set to music by maestro Valter Sivilotti in 2017, is the official anthem of Friuli.

== History ==
In 2017, the cultural association Istitût Ladin Furlan "Pre Checo Placerean" and the newspaper Messaggero Veneto – Giornale del Friuli, in collaboration with the Regional Agency for Friulian Language (ARLeF), organised a competition to select an anthem for Friuli. The piece was chosen from among ten compositions admitted to the contest. As expressly required by the rules of the competition, composed for chorus and classical orchestra, the piece should evoke the main characteristics distinctive to Friuli with reference to the history, traditions, social and linguistic identity of the entire community.

The jury, chaired by the renowned composer Azio Corghi and comprising the musicologists Alessio Screm, Marco Maria Tosolini, Chiara Vidoni as well as the Director of Arlef William Cisilino, announced the piece by Stroili Gurisatti and Sivilotti as a winner, releasing the following statement: "music and lyrics complement each other thanks to wide-ranging vocal and instrumental writing that succeeds in creating considerable melodious momentum." The winner was formally announced in April 2018 during the ceremony of the Festa della Patria del Friuli (Celebration of the Friulian homeland) which that year was hosted by the Municipality of Valvasone-Arzene.

== Premiere and performances ==
The anthem Incuintri al doman was officially presented on 6 October 2018 at the Duomo of Lignano Sabbiadoro. The premiere was performed by the Mitteleuropa Orchestra comprising 47 musicians conducted by maestro Marco Guidarini; the vocal performance was given by the 60 choristers of the Coro del Friuli-Venezia Giulia conducted by maestro Cristiano Dell’Oste. Beethoven's 9th Symphony, which contains "Ode to Joy," i.e. the Anthem of Europe was performed as a prelude to the anthem. The year 2019 saw the piece being performed for the first time during the ceremonies of the Festa della Patria del Friuli in Gorizia.

== Lyrics ==
Friulian lyrics
Incuintri al doman (Imni uficiâl dal Friûl)

In alt o fradis, o int di Aquilee,
devant da la Storie, di front dal doman.
Sin flame che e vîf pes stradis dal mont
sin non di une Patrie, sin fîs dal Friûl.
Scolte o Friûl, o tiere di libars,
di lenghis e popui sês cjase di pâs.
Dai secui i paris nus clamin adun
a fâsi lidrîs di un unic destin.
In alt o Friûl, o Patrie mê sante,
di fuarce e sperance si viest la tô int.
Un popul sigûr che al cjamine te lûs
incuintri al doman, incuintri ai siei fîs.

Italian translation
Incontro al domani (Inno ufficiale del Friuli)

In alto o fratelli, o gente d’Aquileia,
davanti alla Storia, di fronte al domani.
Siamo fiamma che vive per le strade del mondo
Siamo nome d’una Patria, siamo figli del Friuli.
Ascolta o Friuli, o terra di liberi,
di lingue e popoli sei dimora di pace.
Dai secoli i padri ci chiamano insieme
a farci radici di un solo destino.
In alto o Friuli, o Patria mia santa,
di forza e speranza si veste la tua gente.
Un popolo sicuro che cammina nella luce
incontro al domani, incontro ai suoi figli.

English translation
Towards Tomorrow (Official anthem of Friuli)

Up above o brothers, o people of Aquileia,
in front of History, in front of tomorrow.
We are a flame that lives along the paths of the world
We are the name of a Homeland, we are children of Friuli.
Listen o Friuli, land of the free,
of languages and populations, you are the peaceful dwelling.
From the centuries, our forefathers call upon us together
to become the roots of a single destiny.
Up above o Friuli, o my holy Homeland,
in strength and hope your people are clad.
A confident people who walks in the light
towards tomorrow, towards its children.

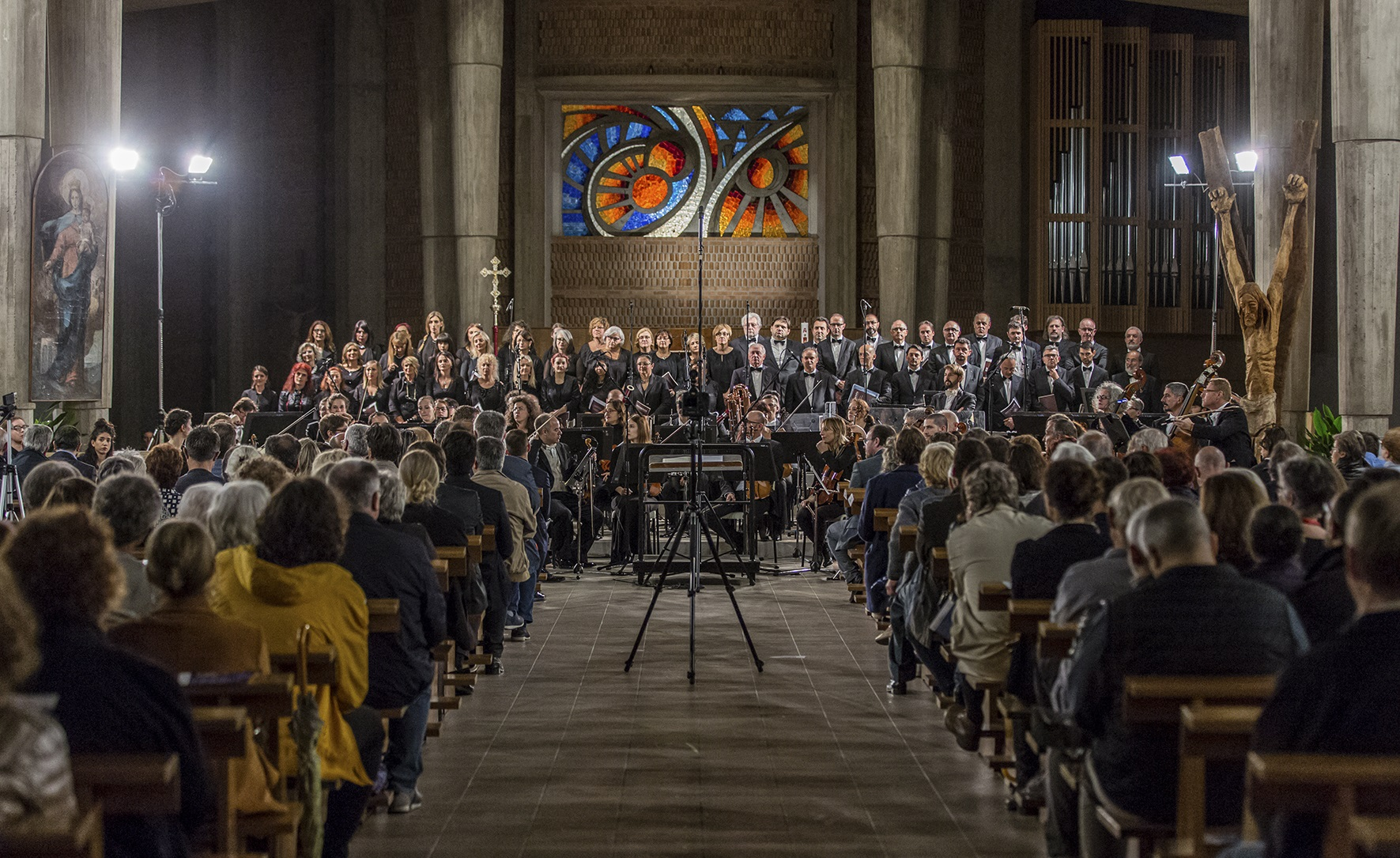
Performance of the Anthem of Friuli in the Duomo of Lignano on 6 October 2018

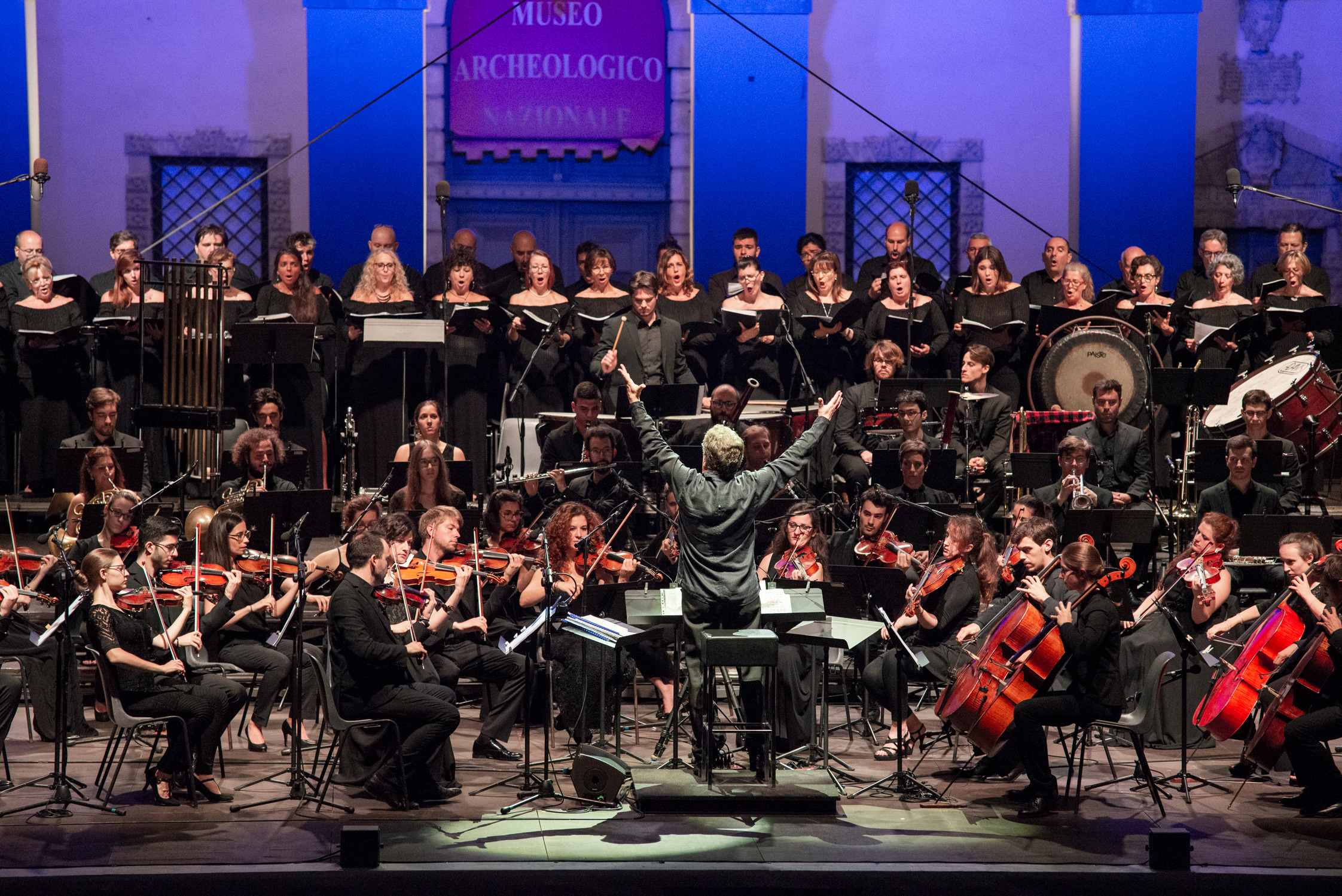
Performance of the Anthem of Friuli at Mittelfest in 2019

== Versions ==
In early 2020, upon the initiative of ARLeF and Istitût Furlan "Pre Checo Placerean", a new music video for the anthem was produced and released on all the online platforms on the occasion of 3 April, with the purpose of virtually celebrate the anniversary of the Homeland along with all the Friulian people in Friuli and around the world. In this video version, rearranged by the musician Geremy Seravalle and performed by the four Friulian vocalists Consuelo Avoledo, Michela Franceschina, Jessica Interdonato and Giulia Polidori of the ArteVoce Ensemble, with the artistic direction of Franca Drioli of ArteVoce Voice&Stage Academy, it is also possible to admire some evocative pictures of Friuli shot by a drone.

The drone could be thought as representing an imaginary "eagle of Friuli" flying over some of the most significant places in the history of Friuli: Aquileia, Cividale, Creta del Crostis, Erto, Frisanco, Gorizia, Isola delle Conchiglie and the Island of Sant’Andrea (Marano Lagunare), Palmanova, Pordenone, Ruttars, Sauris di Sopra, Udine, Venzone, Monte di Ragogna, Monte Coglians.

The video became very successful on the social channels and the YouTube platform of ARLeF, immediately recording a remarkably large number of online interactions: over 170,000 people were reached on Facebook, reporting 21,000 interactions as well as thousands of reactions and shares. In addition, 20,000 users were reached on YouTube.

The scores of the anthem Incuintri al doman were written in 12 adaptations, so that they can be performed by different types of ensembles (orchestras, bands, choruses, etc.) and used on the official occasions that involve the Friulian-speaking communities.
