= Mekfoula Mint Brahim =

Mauritanian biologist

Mekfoula Mint Brahim is a feminist and Women Human Rights Defender in Mauritania, fighting discrimination and speaking against religious extremism. She is President of Pour une Mauritanie Verte et Démocratique ("For a Green and Democratic Mauritania").

== Personal life ==
Mekfoula was born in the late 1960s (she doesn't know her date of birth as her parents were illiterate) in Tawaz, a village in the Adrar region and has 3 sisters and 3 brothers. She has been married 4 times and has a son. She studied to be a molecular biologist and currently works at the National Centre of Oncology.

== Activism ==
Mekfoula Mint Brahim is President of Pour une Mauritanie Verte et Démocratique (For a Green and Democratic Mauritania), a non-governmental organisation founded in 2009 which works with young people to protect and promote human rights and leads women empowerment projects in rural areas. She has been using traditional and social media to speak out against discriminatory practices in Mauritania, including against women and members of the Haratin and Afro-Mauritanian communities, and against reprisals against human rights defenders.

She has suffered a smear campaign in social media by religious groups and received numerous death threats. A fatwa was issued against her and her friend and fellow human right activist Aminetou Mint El-Moctar in 2014 after they called for the death sentence of the blogger and political prisoner Mohamed Mkhaïtir to be quashed. She has been accused of apostasy which is punishable by death.

== Awards and honours ==
In November 2018, Mekfoula was among 15 human rights leaders to be awarded the Franco-German Prize for Human Rights and the Rule of Law which recognizes the “exceptional contribution to the protection and promotion of human rights and the rule of law in their country and at the international level.” Mekfoula was among five African laureates recognised, including Aminata Traoré, Mohamed Lotfy, Vuyiseka Dubula-Majola and Alfredo Okenve Ndoho.

In December 2019, she was made Chevalier de l’ordre de la Légion d’honneur by the French ambassador to Mauritania.
