= Amal Fathy =

Political Prisoner in Egypt

Personal details
- Born: Amal Fathy Ahmed Abdeltawab; September 1, 1984 (age 41) Cairo, Egypt
- Spouse: Mohamed Lotfy (m. 2014)
- Children: Zidane
- Education: Cairo University
- Awards: Index on Censorship

Amal Fathy (born Amal Fathy Ahmad Abdeltawab; September 1, 1984) is an Egyptian democracy activist and human rights defender. She is a former activist of April 6 Youth Movement and a member of the Egyptian Commission for Rights and Freedoms. She continues to be detained under house arrest by the Egyptian authorities since January 2019 for speaking out about sexual harassment in Egypt.

== Early life and activism ==
Amal was born and raised in Cairo in Egypt and attended Cairo University. Before graduating, she joined the Egyptian April 6 Youth Movement and got involved in the promotion of democratic changes in the country. After the 2013 Egyptian coup d'état and August 2013 Rabaa massacre, she left politics and limited herself as distant observer and an online commentator. She met her husband Mohamed Lotfy, the co-founder of the Egyptian Commission for Rights and Freedoms, in Cairo and married him in 2014. After marriage, she focused on her small family and gave birth to Zidane in August 2015. While she was mainly taking care of her newly born boy, her husband Mohamed Lotfy, an Egyptian-Swiss National, was expanding ECRF to become one of the most important Human Rights Organisations in the country. He was firstly banned from traveling to Germany in June 2015 and had his Egyptian passport was confiscated at Cairo airport. He was traveling to Germany to participate in a debate at the German Parliament Bundestag on the visit of General Sisi to Berlin.

== Arrest ==
=== Background ===
In January 2016, an Italian young researcher, Giulio Regeni, was kidnapped, tortured, killed and his body was found on the outskirts of Cairo on February 3 of the same year. ECRF Lawyers became officially his family lawyers in Egypt operating closely with the family lawyer in Italy. The harassment and intimidation of ECRF and Mohamed Lotfy intensified. On April 8, 2016, the Italian Prime Minister Paolo Gentiloni recalled Italy's ambassador to Cairo protesting the lack of progress in the investigation by Egyptian authorities into the torture and murder of Giulio Regeni. Two weeks later, Ahmed Abdallah, the president of the board of ECRF, was arrested from his home in Cairo on April 25, 2016. He was released six months later only after an exchange of visits between the Egyptian and Italian prosecutions teams working on the case of Giulio Regeni.

While the search for truth and justice for Giulio Regeni continues, serious efforts were put in place to return to "normality" and give a fake impression to the Italians, Egyptians and the world that the case is closed and dead. The Italian ambassador was sent back to Egypt in September 2017 against every human rights Organisation call, including Amnesty International-Italy. Yet, under the persistence of the legal teams in Egypt and Italy, the Egyptian General Attorney accepted to hand thousands of documents of investigations to ECRF lawyers and to his Italian lawyer in Genoa. These were translated in Italian and analysed by Regeni's family legal teams.

=== Facebook video and arrest ===
In May 2018, the cooperation intensified between the legal teams in both countries with long phone calls setting up the strategy ahead. On 9 May Amal Fathy posted a video on her Facebook page in which she spoke about the prevalence of sexual harassment in Egypt, and criticized the government's failure to protect women. She also criticised the government for deteriorating human rights, socioeconomic conditions and public services. Amnesty International examined the 12-minute video and found that it does not contain incitement of any form, and as such is protected by freedom of expression. On 11 May 2018, around 2:30 am, Egyptian security forces raided Amal Fathy and Mohamed Lotfy's home in Maadi in Cairo and brought them both to the police station, along with their three-year-old child. Mohamed Lotfy was set free with his little boy while Amal Fathy remained detained.

On 29 September 2018, Amal Fathy, who had already spent 141 days in prison after being arbitrarily arrested for posting the Facebook video decrying sexual harassment and criticising the Egyptian authorities for failing to protect women, was sentenced to two years in prison with a bail of 20,000 EGP (US$1,120) to temporarily suspend the sentence and a fine of 10,000 EGP (US$560). On September 30, 2018, she appealed the case and paid the bail. The first appeal hearing was scheduled on October 25, 2018. Egyptian women are particularly vulnerable to violence in the public space, with 99.3% of women and girls reporting some form of sexual harassment and assault in their lifetime.

As of 2019, Fathy has been released from jail but remains under house arrest.
