= Fiumicello =

- Frazione
- Location of Fiumicello in Italy
- Coordinates: 45°47′N 13°25′E
- Country: Italy
- Region: Friuli-Venezia Giulia
- Province: Udine (UD)
- Comune: Fiumicello Villa Vicentina

Area
  - Total: 22.9 km^{2} (8.8 sq mi)
- Elevation: 6 m (20 ft)

Population (Dec. 2004)
  - Total: 4,715
  - Density: 206/km^{2} (533/sq mi)
- Demonym: Fiumicellesi
- Time zone: UTC+1 (CET)
  - Summer (DST): UTC+2 (CEST)
- Postal code: 33050
- Dialing code: 0431
- Patron saint: St. Valentine
- Website: Official website

Fiumicello (Friulian: Flumisel, Slovene: Rečica) is a frazione of Fiumicello Villa Vicentina in the Province of Udine in the Italian region Friuli-Venezia Giulia, located about 35 kilometres (22 mi) northwest of Trieste and about 35 kilometres (22 mi) southeast of Udine.

Fiumicello borders the following municipalities: Aquileia, Grado, Ruda, San Canzian d'Isonzo, Turriaco, Villa Vicentina.

== Demographic evolution ==
Historical population

Year	Pop.	±%
1861	?	—
1871	?	—
1881	?	—
1901	?	—
1911	?	—

Year	Pop.	±%
1921	3,918	—
1931	3,972	+1.4%
1936	4,018	+1.2%
1951	4,472	+11.3%
1961	4,215	−5.7%

Year	Pop.	±%
1971	4,115	−2.4%
1981	4,409	+7.1%
1991	4,461	+1.2%
2001	4,297	−3.7%

Source: Data from ISTAT

== Twin towns ==
- Le Temple-sur-Lot, France

== Climate ==
Climate is characterized by relatively high temperatures and evenly distributed precipitation throughout the year. Temperatures are high and can lead to warm, oppressive nights. Summers are usually somewhat wetter than winters, with much of the rainfall coming from convectional thunderstorm activity. The Köppen Climate Classification subtype for this climate is "Cfa" (Humid Subtropical Climate).

== Notable people ==
- Pietro Blaserna (1836–1918), mathematician and physicist
- Giulio Regeni (1988–2016), student torture murdered by Egyptian police
