= Villesse =

- Comune
- Comune di Villesse
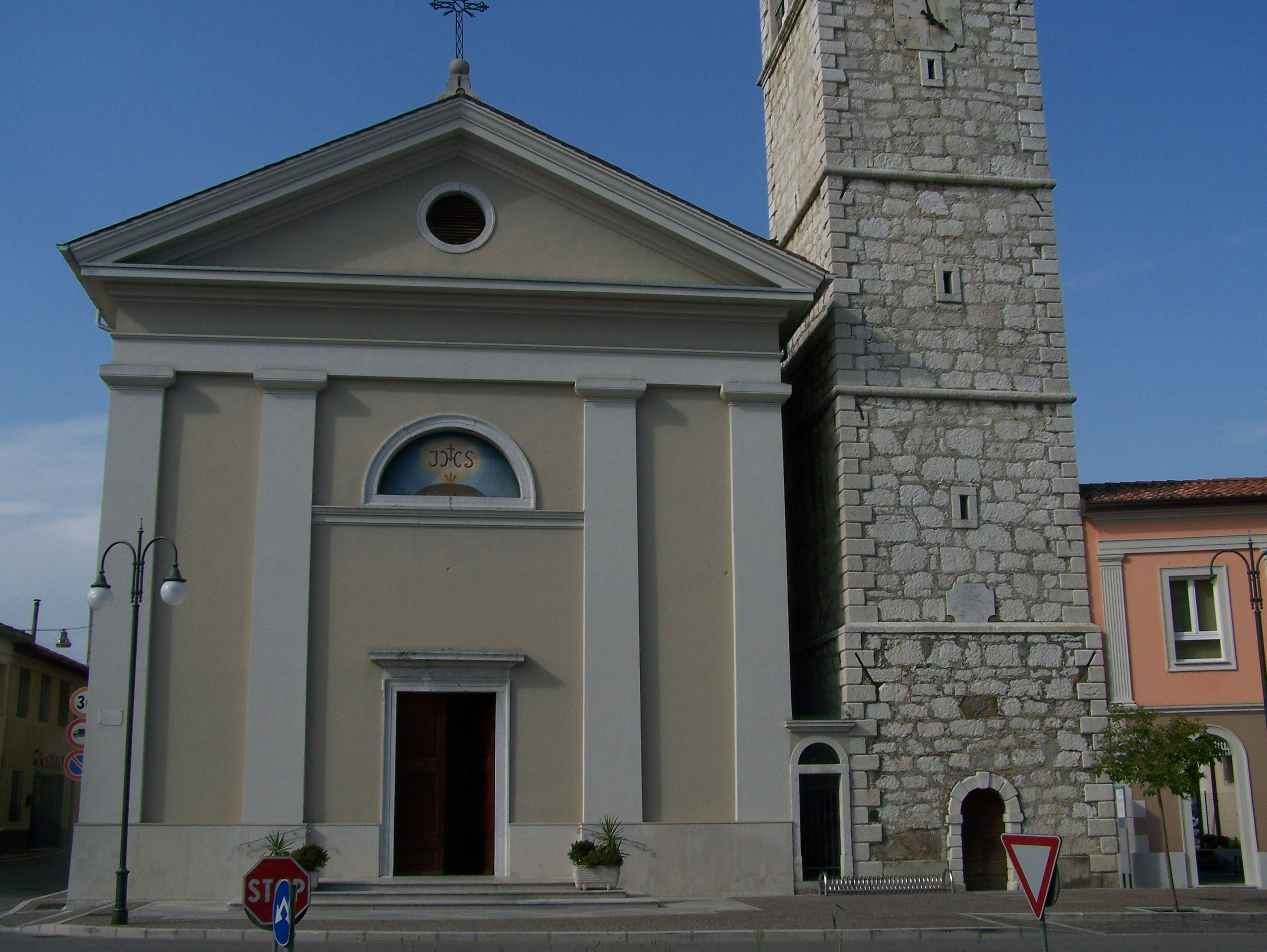
- Church of Saint Roch

- Location of the municipality of Villesse in the former province of Gorizia

- Location within Italy Location within Friuli-Venezia Giulia
- Coordinates: 45°52′N 13°26′E
- Country: Italy
- Region: Friuli-Venezia Giulia
- Province: Gorizia (GO)

Government
  - Mayor: Flavia Viola (Lista civica "Siamo Villesse")

Area
  - Total: 11.8 km^{2} (4.6 sq mi)
- Elevation: 18 m (59 ft)

Population (1 January 2024)
  - Total: 1,607
  - Density: 136/km^{2} (353/sq mi)
- Time zone: UTC+1 (CET)
  - Summer (DST): UTC+2 (CEST)
- Postal code: 34070
- Dialing code: 0481

Villesse (Friulian: Vilès; Slovene: Vileš) is a comune (municipality) in the Regional decentralization entity of Gorizia in the Italian region of Friuli-Venezia Giulia, located about 40 kilometres (25 mi) northwest of Trieste and about 15 kilometres (9 mi) southwest of Gorizia. As of 1 January 2024, it had a population of 1,607 and an area of 11.8 square kilometres (4.6 mi^{2}).

Villesse borders the following municipalities: Campolongo al Torre, Fogliano Redipuglia, Gradisca d'Isonzo, Romans d'Isonzo, Ruda, San Pier d'Isonzo, Tapogliano.

== Physical geography ==
Villesse is located in a portion of the Friulian plain between the Isonzo and Torre rivers which join together a little further downstream. It is located between the municipality of Romans d'Isonzo to the north, the Isonzo river to the south-east and the municipality of Ruda to the west.

== History ==
There is little information on the history of the town before the 19th century, the period in which the oldest map depicting the town is dated.

== Monuments and places of interest ==
- Parish Church of San Rocco;
- Palazzo Coronini, from the 18th century, home to the municipal library;
- Eighteenth-century tower called Turisin located in Via Androna Veneta;
- Cippo Napoleonico in Pra della Barca;
- Chapel of Charles I of Habsburg on the banks of the Torre

== Demographic evolution ==
Historical population

Year	Pop.	±%
1861	?	—
1871	?	—
1881	?	—
1901	?	—
1911	?	—
1921	1,339	—

Year	Pop.	±%
1931	1,321	−1.3%
1936	1,271	−3.8%
1951	1,428	+12.4%
1961	1,419	−0.6%
1971	1,465	+3.2%
1981	1,604	+9.5%

Year	Pop.	±%
1991	1,626	+1.4%
2001	1,577	−3.0%
2011	1,717	+8.9%
2021	1,640	−4.5%

Source: Data from ISTAT

== Culture ==
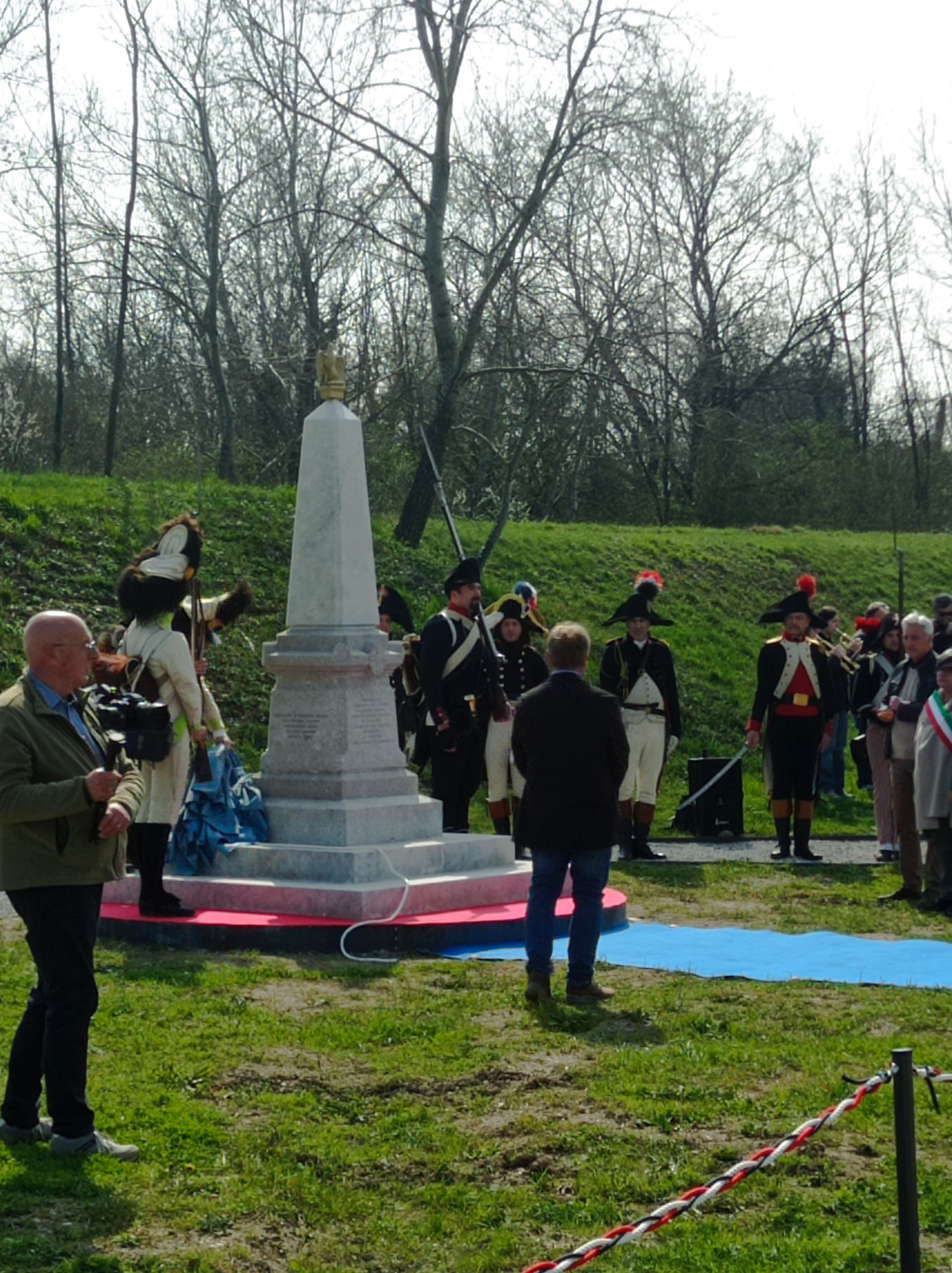
Napoleone Monument at Villesse

=== Associations ===
It is certainly worth mentioning the group of I Blaudins, a local historical research and cultural promotion group from Villessi, which over the years has distinguished itself in various projects, including the search for soldiers from Villessi in the Great War and the more recent inauguration of a memorial stone dedicated to the passage of Napoleon Bonaparte through the town.

=== Events ===
The patron saint, San Rocco, is celebrated on 16 August with events and food and wine stands in the parish recreational area. It is tradition that the two districts of the town, the "Plaza" and the "Porciaria" challenge each other in a series of competitions, from which the winner of the festival emerges. On the last Sunday of October, Thanksgiving is celebrated, with the market and food and wine kiosks in the center organized by local associations. In mid-October, the non-competitive foot race "corsa dei fasans" (pheasant race) takes place, traditionally organized by the local blood donors section.

== Infrastructure and transport ==
In the municipal area there is the junction for the A34 from the A4 to Gradisca, Gorizia and Slovenia.

== Economy ==
In addition to agricultural activities, Villesse hosts notable artisan and industrial settlements on the regional road 351, the only IKEA store in Friuli-Venezia Giulia, included in the commercial complex of the region (called Tiare Shopping).
