= Campolongo =

Campolongo may refer to a neighbourhood in Spain:

- Campolongo, in the city of Pontevedra, Province of Pontevedra (PO), Galicia

Campolongo may refer to several places in Italy:

Municipalities (comuni)

- Campolongo Maggiore, in the Province of Venice, Veneto
- Campolongo Minore, old name of Campodoro, in the Province of Padua, Veneto
- Campolongo sul Brenta, in the Province of Vicenza, Veneto
- Campolongo Tapogliano, in the Province of Udine, Friuli-Venezia Giulia

Civil parishes (frazioni)

- Campolongo (Conegliano), in the municipality of Conegliano (TV), Veneto
- Campolongo (Eboli), in the municipality of Eboli (SA), Campania
- Campolongo (Fossalta di Piave), in the municipality of Fossalta di Piave (VE), Veneto
- Campolongo (Isola di Capo Rizzuto), in the municipality of Isola di Capo Rizzuto (KR), Calabria
- Campolongo (San Germano dei Berici), in the municipality of San Germano dei Berici (VI), Veneto
- Campolongo (Santo Stefano di Cadore), in the municipality of Santo Stefano di Cadore (BL), Veneto
- Campolongo al Torre, in the municipality of Campolongo Tapogliano (UD), Friuli-Venezia Giulia

Mountains

- Campolongo Pass, a mountain pass of the Dolomites in Trentino-South Tyrol

People

- Alberto Campolongo (1912-unknown), Italian chess master
