= Ruda, Friuli =

Ruda Rude (Friulian)
- Comune
- Comune di Ruda
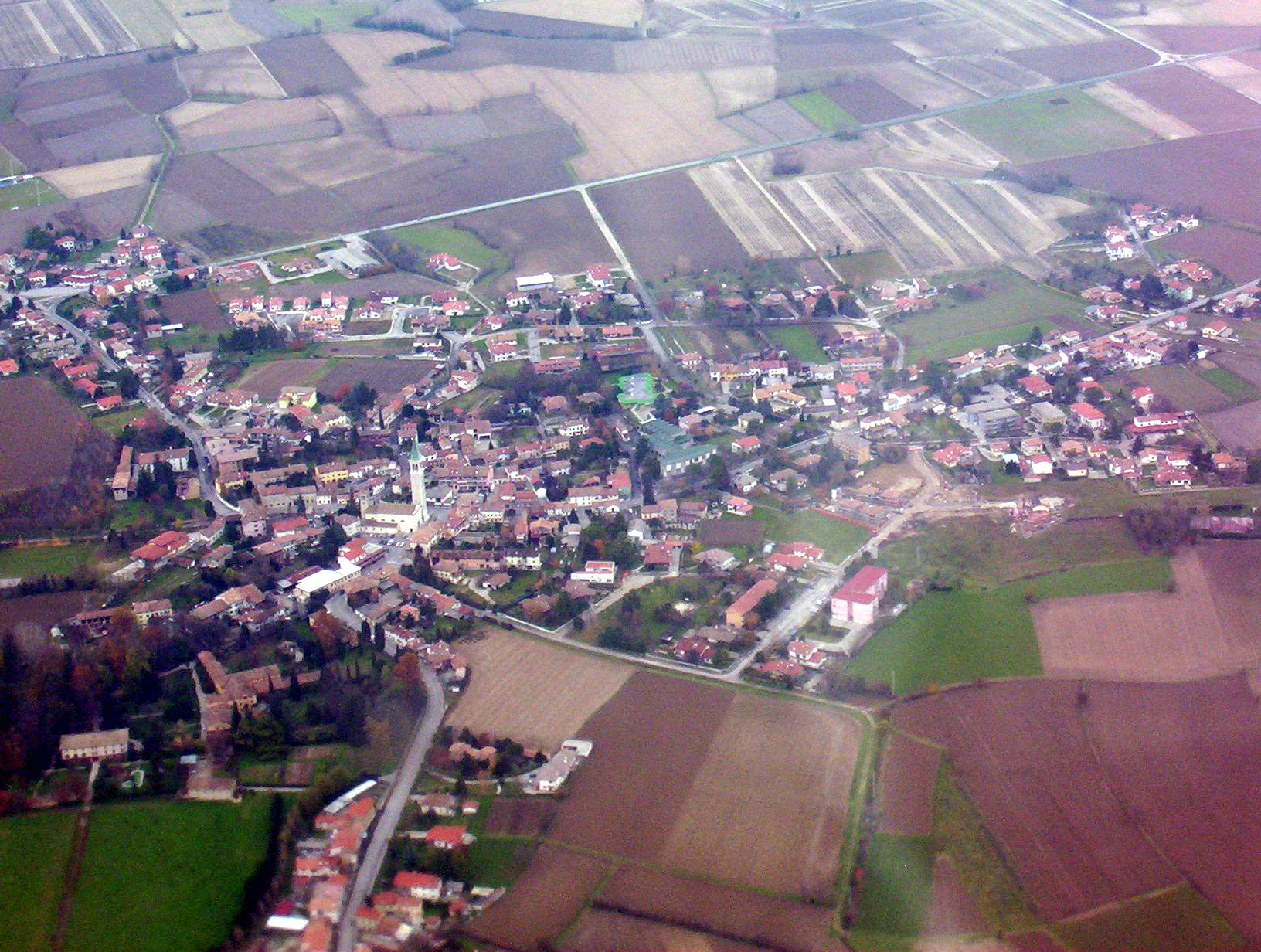

- Coat of arms

- Location within Italy Location within Friuli-Venezia Giulia
- Coordinates: 45°50′N 13°24′E
- Country: Italy
- Region: Friuli-Venezia Giulia
- Province: Udine (UD)
- Frazioni: Alture, Armellino, Cortona Alta, La Fredda, Mortesins, Perteole, Saciletto, San Nicolò

Government
  - Mayor: Franco Lenarduzzi

Area
  - Total: 19.46 km^{2} (7.51 sq mi)
- Elevation: 12 m (39 ft)

Population (1 January 2021)
  - Total: 2,836
  - Density: 145.7/km^{2} (377.5/sq mi)
- Demonym: Rudese(i)
- Time zone: UTC+1 (CET)
  - Summer (DST): UTC+2 (CEST)
- Postal code: 33050
- Dialing code: 0431
- Patron saint: St. Stephen
- Saint day: December 26
- Website: Official website

Ruda (Friulian: Rude) is a comune (municipality) in the Regional decentralization entity of Udine in the Italian region of Friuli-Venezia Giulia, located about 40 kilometres (25 mi) northwest of Trieste and about 30 kilometres (19 mi) southeast of Udine.

Ruda borders the following municipalities: Aiello del Friuli, Campolongo al Torre, Cervignano del Friuli, Fiumicello Villa Vicentina, San Pier d'Isonzo, Turriaco, Villesse.

Ruda was the birthplace of footballer Tarcisio Burgnich.
