= Blason (disambiguation) =

Blason may refer to:

- Blason, form of poetry
- Blason populaire, umbrella genre in the field of folkloristics
- Giacomo Blason (1914 - 1998), Italian professional football player and coach
- Ivano Blason (1923 – 2002), Italian footballer
- Redorer son blason, a social practice

== See also ==
- Blazon
