= Metwaly =

Metwaly or variants Metwali, Metwally and Metwalli (Arabic: متولي) is a surname that means he who takes charge. Notable people with the surname include:

== Metwaly ==
- Ibrahim Metwaly, Egyptian lawyer and human rights activist, member of the Egyptian Commission for Rights and Freedoms
- Mazen Metwaly (born 1990), Egyptian swimmer

== Metwalli ==
- Mahmoud Metwalli (born 1993), Egyptian footballer
- Mustafa Metwalli (1949—2000), Egyptian actor

== Metwally ==
- Mariam Ibrahim Metwally (born 1996), Egyptian squash player
- Omar Metwally (born 1974), American actor

== See also ==
- Sayed Metwally Complex, a training center of Egyptian multi-sport club Al-Masry SC
- Metwallis (matāwila), older name for Lebanese Shia Muslims
