= Alfredo Okenve Ndoho =

Equatoguinean professor (born 1968)

Alfredo Okenve
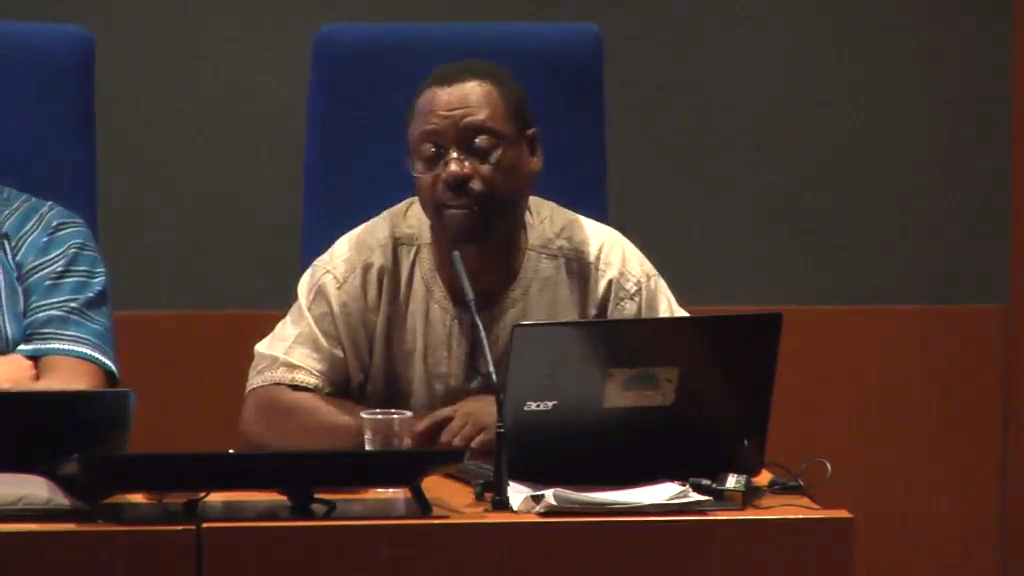
- Okenve in 2018
- Born: Alfredo Okenve Ndoho; 1968 (age 57–58); Bata
- Occupations: Professor; Human rights activist
- Employer(s): Centre for Development Studies and Initiatives
- Known for: Human rights activism in Equatorial Guinea
- Awards: Franco-German Prize for Human Rights (2018)

Alfredo Okenve Ndoho (born 1968) is an Equatoguinean physics professor and human rights activist who is the vice president of the Centre for Development Studies and Initiatives (Spanish: Centro de Estudios e inciativas para el Desarrollo, CEID), a human rights organisation in Equatorial Guinea.

== Biography ==
Born and raised in Bata, Litoral, Equatorial Guinea, Okenve studied mathematics and physics and went on to become a university professor. Since 2010, he has been unable to practice as a professor due to his activism and criticism of the Equatoguinean government.

In 1999, Okenve was among the founders of the Centre for Development Studies and Initiatives (CEID), which has called out human rights abuses in Equatorial Guinea, in addition to calling out corruption, particularly in the extractive industries. Okenve is a critic of the country's long-serving president, Teodoro Obiang Nguema Mbasogo, whom he has likened to the Spanish dictator Francisco Franco. Okenve has also criticised the Spanish government for its lack of support to Equatorial Guinea, which was formerly a Spanish colony; he has accused the government of racism when comparing its relative lack of recognition of its colonial ties with Equatorial Guinea when compared to South American countries. In 2019, Okenve toured Galicia with Amnesty International raising awareness of Equatoguinean issues and Spain's role in the country's history.

In March 2017, the Ministry of the Interior ordered the CEID to suspend its activities. Okenve was fined 10 million XAF and imprisoned for 16 days for breaching the government's order.

On 27 October 2018, Okenve was assaulted by a group of plain-clothed security officers, allegedly on the orders of Obiang, and was found abandoned in a rural area outside of Bata. It has been alleged that Okenve had been mistaken for his brother, a local opposition politician. Okenve's significant injuries required him to go to Spain for medical treatment, where he spent a period of time in intensive care. Okenve returned to Equatorial Guinea on 16 March 2019, having publicly stated his intention to return to the country to fight for freedom, rather than seeking asylum in Spain.

On 15 March 2019, Okenve was arrested at Malabo International Airport. Earlier that day, he had been travelling to Malabo to receive the Franco-German Prize for Human Rights, which he had been awarded the previous year but had been unable to accept due to him being in hospital in Spain. Upon hearing of the arrest of his cousin, Joaquín Mengué Obama, for refusing to disclose Okenve's location to officers, Okenve had returned to the airport and attempted to leave the country. Following his arrest, Okenve was returned to Bata on a military plane and placed under house arrest, with his mobile phone and passport confiscated.

Okenve's arrest was condemned by international human rights organisations, including Amnesty International, the International Federation for Human Rights and Front Line Defenders, who called on the Equatoguinean government to lift restrictions on Okenve's freedom of movement, and to allow him to continue to do his work safely.

== Recognition ==
In 2018, Okenve was one of the laureates for the Franco-German Prize for Human Rights in recognition of his work with the CEID. Other African laureates that year included Aminata Traoré, Mohamed Lotfy and Mekfoula Mint Brahim.
