= Association of Women Heads of Households =

The Association of Women Heads of Households (AFCF, French: Association des femmes chefs de familles) is a non-governmental women's rights organisation based in Mauritania.

== History ==
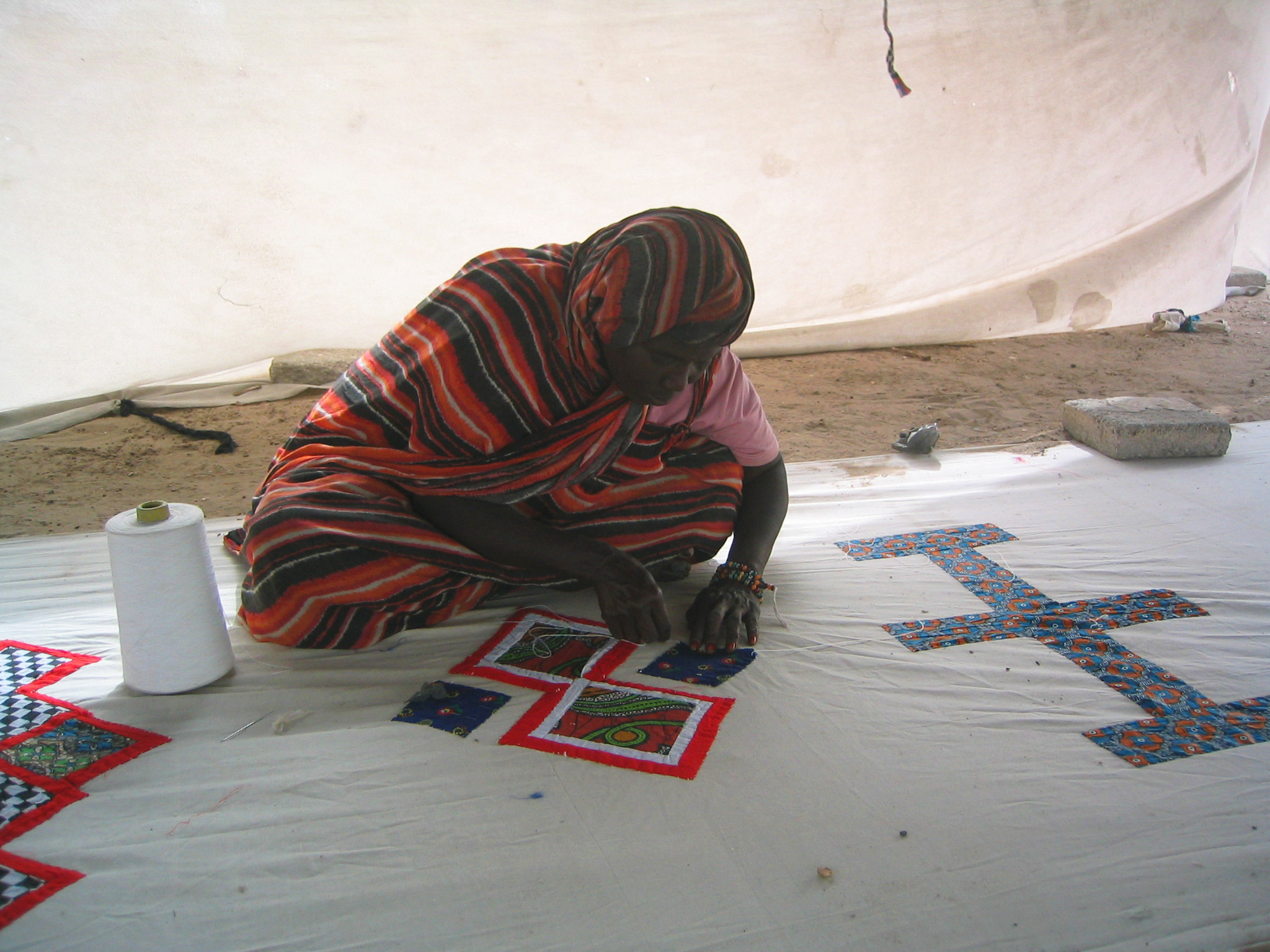
A woman from Nouakchott sews a khaïma

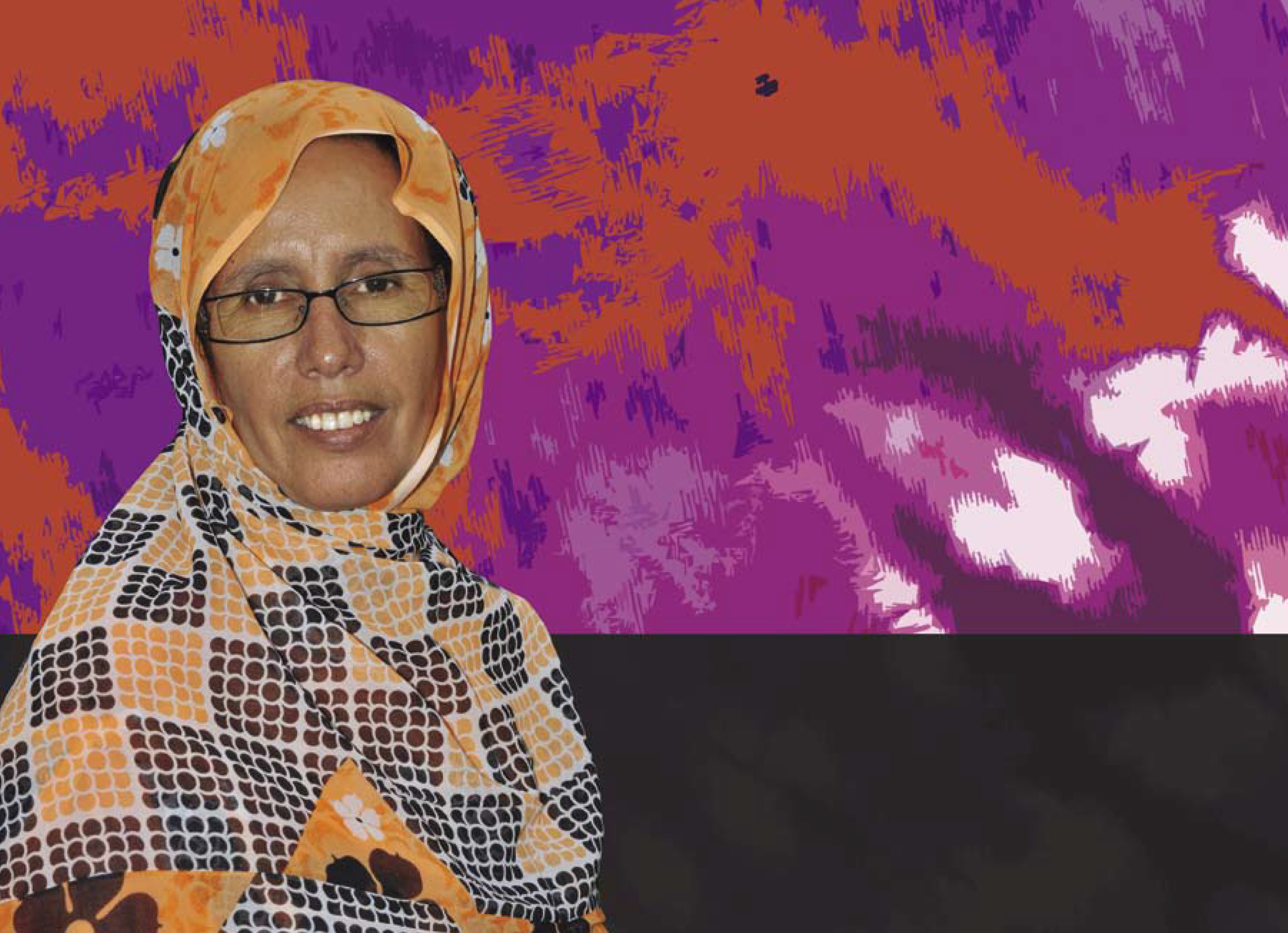
Aminetou Mint El-Moctar

On 17 April 1999, Mauritanian women's rights activist Aminetou Mint El-Moctar founded The Association of Women Heads of Households, in order to campaign and raise awareness about the human rights restrictions that women from Mauritania may face. From its outset, the AFCF has been designed to reflect the diversity of Mauritania, including Arab, Berber, Haratin, Pulaar, Soninke and Wolof women.

The AFCF has been at the forefront of a number of campaigns in Mauritania to improve the conditions of women in the country. In 2011, the organisation was working with the government to bring a stop to the exportation of child brides to the Arabian peninsula. The organisation has also campaigned widely against the practice of force-feeding young women before marriage, a traditional practice created in order to reflect the wealth of the husband, but one that in fact restricts both the health of women and their engagement in local communities. In 2016, the AFCF proposed new legislation to the Mauritanian government to defend women rights, in particular to introduce harsher sentences for rape. The proposal was rejected by the Mauritanian government as it did not comply with Sharia law. They have campaigned against sexual violence against women, in urban and also in rural contexts and from 2012 encouraged all police stations to have social workers on site to support survivors of sexual violence and to encourage the women to prosecute. They campaign to bring an end to female genital mutilation. Mauritania only prohibited in slavery in 1981 and it is still practised throughout the country. The AFCF campaigns against modern slavery. For her role in the anti-slavery programme, El-Moctar was nominated for the 2015 Nobel Peace Prize. They work to end the abuse of domestic workers, as well as encouraging women to take part in political life, locally and nationally. In 2017, the AFCF encouraged the government to adopt a new law promoting sexual health.

As of 2019 the AFCF has 12,000 members, six rescue centres for victims, 168 social workers, four lawyers and a contact person in every city in Mauritania. A literacy campaign funded by the AFCF has reached over 20,000 girls in rural areas of Nouakchott alone and has helped over 73,000 people gain civil status and therefore access to rights and protection.
