= Tapogliano =

- Frazione
- Location of Tapogliano in Italy
- Coordinates: 45°53′N 13°24′E
- Country: Italy
- Region: Friuli-Venezia Giulia
- Province: Udine (UD)
- Comune: Campolongo Tapogliano

Area
  - Total: 5.0 km^{2} (1.9 sq mi)

Population (Dec. 2004)
  - Total: 452
  - Density: 90/km^{2} (230/sq mi)
- Demonym: Tapoglianesi
- Time zone: UTC+1 (CET)
  - Summer (DST): UTC+2 (CEST)
- Dialing code: 0431

Tapogliano (Slovene: Tapoljan), is a locality and former comune (municipality) in the Province of Udine in the Italian region Friuli-Venezia Giulia, located about 40 km (25 mi) northwest of Trieste and about 25 km (16 mi) southeast of Udine. As of 31 December 2004, it had a population of 452 and an area of 5.0 km^{2} (1.9 sq mi).

Tapogliano bordered the following municipalities: Campolongo al Torre, Romans d'Isonzo, San Vito al Torre, Villesse.

In 2009 it became part of the newly created comune of Campolongo Tapogliano.

== Demographic evolution ==
Historical population

Year	Pop.	±%
1861	?	—
1871	?	—
1881	?	—
1901	?	—
1911	?	—

Year	Pop.	±%
1921	662	—
1931	631	−4.7%
1936	631	+0.0%
1951	634	+0.5%
1961	594	−6.3%

Year	Pop.	±%
1971	514	−13.5%
1981	455	−11.5%
1991	466	+2.4%
2001	456	−2.1%

Source: Data from ISTAT
