= Giacomo Blason =

Italian footballer and coach

Personal information
- Date of birth: 19 March 1914
- Place of birth: Fiumicello, Italy
- Date of death: 3 February 1998 (aged 83)
- Place of death: Monfalcone, Italy
- Height: 1.78 m (5 ft 10 in)
- Position: Goalkeeper

Senior career*
Years	Team	Apps	(Gls)
1931–1932	Monfalcone	15	(0)
1932–1934	Triestina	60	(0)
1934–1940	Lazio	150	(0)
1940–1942	Napoli	30	(0)
1942–1944	Roma	21	(0)
1945–1947	Pro Gorizia		
1947–1948	Suzzara	14	(0)

Managerial career
- Adriese
- 1960–1963: Mestrina
- 1963–1964: SPAL
- 1965–1966: Savoia
- * Club domestic league appearances and goals

Giacomo Blason (born 19 March 1914 in Fiumicello; died 3 February 1998 in Monfalcone) was an Italian professional football player and coach who played as a goalkeeper.

== Playing career ==
Blason played for 11 seasons (252 games) in the Serie A for U.S. Triestina Calcio, S.S. Lazio, S.S.C. Napoli and A.S. Roma.

== Managing career ==
As a coach, Blason managed SPAL in the Serie A in the 1963–64 season.
