= Terzo d'Aquileia =

Terzo d'Aquileia Tiars (Friulian) Ters (Venetian)
- Comune
- Comune di Terzo di Aquileia
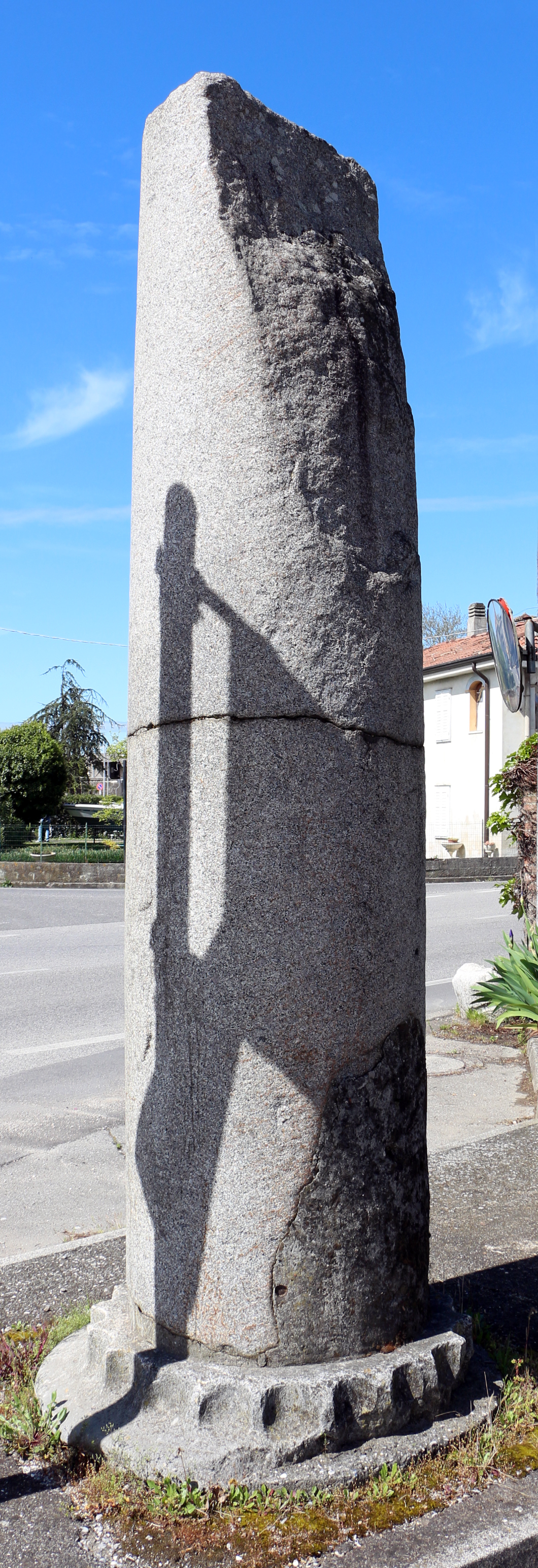
- Roman column

- Location within Italy Location within Friuli-Venezia Giulia
- Coordinates: 45°48′N 13°20′E
- Country: Italy
- Region: Friuli-Venezia Giulia
- Province: Udine (UD)
- Frazioni: San Martino

Government
  - Mayor: Giosualdo Quaini (centro-sinitra)

Area
  - Total: 28.36 km^{2} (10.95 sq mi)
- Elevation: 5 m (16 ft)

Population (28 February 2017)
  - Total: 2,824
  - Density: 99.58/km^{2} (257.9/sq mi)
- Demonym: Terzesi
- Time zone: UTC+1 (CET)
  - Summer (DST): UTC+2 (CEST)
- Postal code: 33050
- Dialing code: 0431
- Website: Official website

Terzo d'Aquileia (officially Terzo di Aquileia; Friulian: Tierç, locally Tiars; Bisiacco: Ters) is a comune (municipality) in the Regional decentralization entity of Udine in the Italian region of Friuli-Venezia Giulia, located about 40 kilometres (25 mi) northwest of Trieste and about 30 kilometres (19 mi) south of Udine.

== Geography ==
Terzo d'Aquileia is located in the middle of oriental Bassa Friulana. It's crossed by the main road strada statale 352 and bordered by the Terzo river. Terzo borders the following municipalities: Aquileia, Cervignano del Friuli, Fiumicello Villa Vicentina, Grado, Torviscosa.

== History ==
Terzo d'Aquileia was crossed by two important roman roads, the via Annia and the via Postumia. Terzo was 3 miles from Aquileia, from here the name in Latin of the residential area (Ad Tertium). In 1800 the rich family Vianello, owners of the palace Vianello now location of the town hall, created their own citizen autonomy.

== Cityscape ==
One of the most important building of the town is the church of San Biagio, in neoclassic architecture; was built in 1843 and sanctified the 8th November 1846. The apse keeps a fresco which represent the Trinità con cori di angeli, painted in XIX by Sebastiano Santi.

The church of San Martino was built in the homonymous fraction of the town; the building, even though of smaller size, has more history.

== Events ==
The most charatteristic event of Terzo d'Aquileia is the festa della zucca. This event is celebrated in the San Martino fraction of the town every weekend of the third week of October. Another charatteristic event of Terzo is the sagra of San Pieri, the festival of the town celebrated every last weekend of June at San Biagio church.
