= Montgiscard =

- Commune
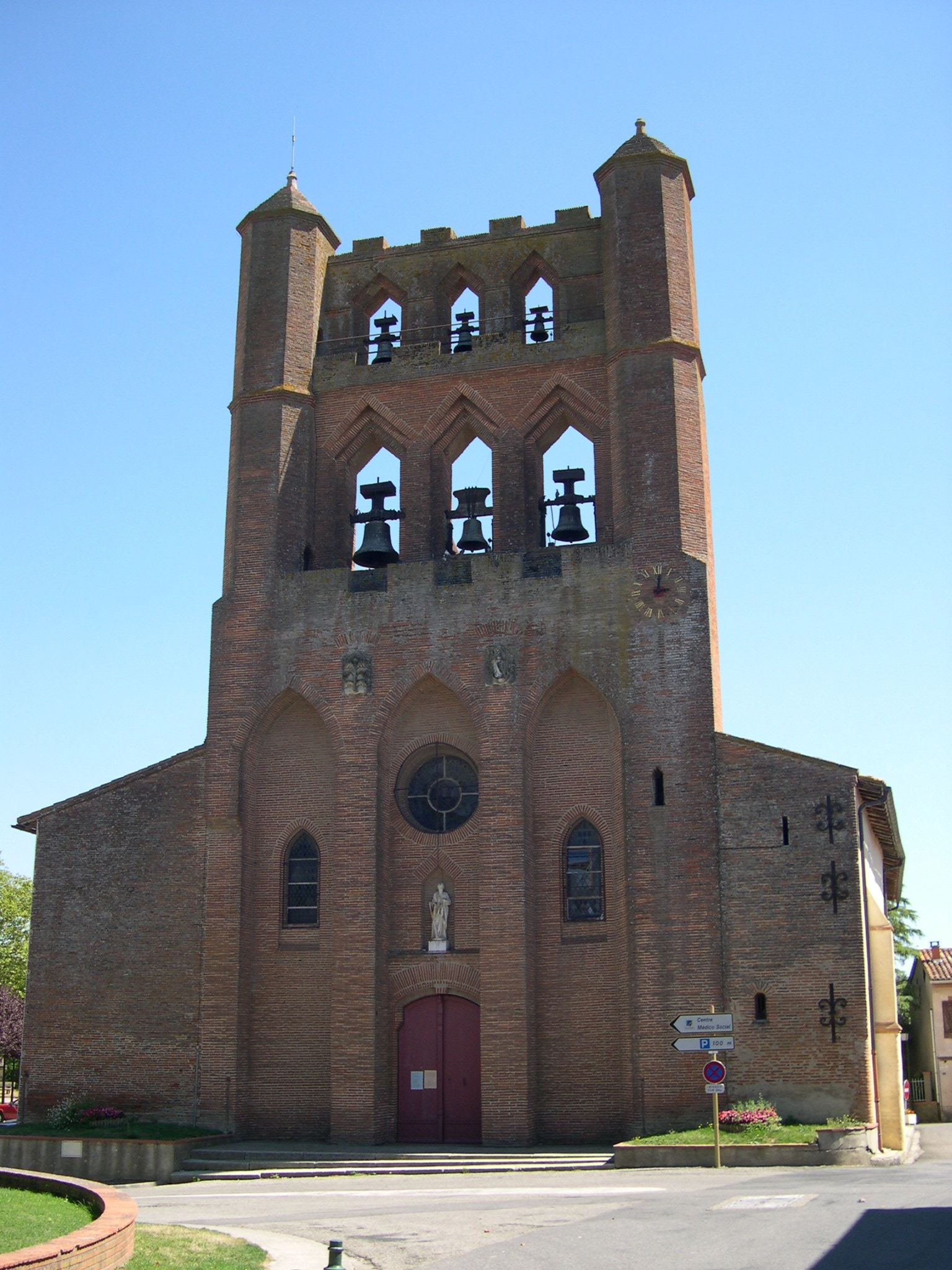
- The church in Montgiscard

- Coat of arms
- Location of Montgiscard
- Location within France Location within Occitanie
- Coordinates: 43°27′32″N 1°34′28″E
- Country: France
- Region: Occitania
- Department: Haute-Garonne
- Arrondissement: Toulouse
- Canton: Escalquens
- Intercommunality: CA Sicoval

Government
  - Mayor (2020–2026): Laurent Forest
- Area^{1}: 13.16 km^{2} (5.08 sq mi)
- Elevation: 170 m (560 ft)
- Highest elevation: 274 m (899 ft)
- Lowest elevation: 153 m (502 ft)
- Population (2023): 2,587
  - Density: 196.6/km^{2} (509.1/sq mi)
- Time zone: UTC+01:00 (CET)
  - Summer (DST): UTC+02:00 (CEST)
- INSEE/Postal code: 31381 /31450
- ^{1} French Land Register data, which excludes lakes, ponds, glaciers > 1 km^{2} (0.386 sq mi or 247 acres) and river estuaries.

Montgiscard (French pronunciation: [mɔ̃ʒiskaʁ]) is a commune in the Haute-Garonne department of southwestern France.

== Population ==
Historical population
Year	Pop.	±% p.a.
1968	873	—
1975	1,281	+5.63%
1982	1,575	+3.00%
1990	1,792	+1.63%
1999	1,947	+0.93%
2007	2,047	+0.63%
2012	2,119	+0.69%
2017	2,430	+2.78%
2023	2,587	+1.05%
Source: INSEE

== Twin towns ==
Montgiscard is twinned with:

- Campolongo Tapogliano, Italy, since 2005

== See also ==
- Communes of the Haute-Garonne department
