= Egyptian Commission for Rights and Freedoms =

Egyptian human rights organisation

Egyptian Commission for Rights and Freedoms (ECRF)
- المفوضية المصرية للحقوق و الحريات
- Founded: 2013
- Founders: Ahmed Abdallah; Mohamed Lotfy; Mohamed Sameh
- Type: Human rights organisation
- Purpose: Human rights Civil rights
- Region served: Egypt
- Key people: Mohamed Lotfy, Sherif Azer
- Website: Official website

The Egyptian Commission for Rights and Freedoms (ECRF) (Arabic: المفوضية المصرية للحقوق و الحريات, romanized: al-Mafwaḍiyyah al-Miṣriyyah lil-Ḥuqūq wal-Ḥurrīyāt) is an Egyptian human rights organisation based in Cairo. The organisation has been subject to continuous harassment by the Egyptian authorities after reporting on human rights abuses by the el-Sisi government. ECRF is one of the very few human rights organisations still operating inside a country increasingly hostile to dissent and in which countless civil society organisations have been forced to close. The commission coordinates campaigns for those who have been tortured or disappeared, as well as highlighting numerous incidences of human rights abuses.

== Founders ==
- Ahmed Abdallah, chairman of the board of trustees.
- Mohamed Lotfy, executive director.
- Mohamed Sameh, International Relations Advisor.

== Human rights campaigns ==
ECRF started operating in September 2013 as a membership based human rights organisation mainly conducting trainings to activists on the basic concepts of human rights, skills of documentation of violations, strategic campaigning, and legal awareness-raising. These were received by youth activists who requested more engagement into human rights advocacy. Believing that all human beings are capable of defending human rights in their local communities, ECRF focuses on coordinating and accompanying the activists' energy to collectively work on the pressing issues of civil, political, economic, or social rights. This approach aims at documenting and mitigating human rights violations, raising civil awareness and community participation in human rights and development efforts.

ECRF tracks forced disappearances in the country. These have spiked since General Abdel-Fatah Al-Sisi came to power in 2013. The Commission investigates the unauthorised use of military camps in the country for the detention of civilians. These could be held outside of judicial oversight in secret military prisons. In June 2014, The Guardian published a long article on the Azouli military jail in the Suez Canal area: "Prisoners at Azouli are routinely electrocuted, beaten and hanged naked by their tied wrists for hours until they either give up specific information, memorise confessions or until – in the case of a small group of released former inmates – are deemed of no further use to their interrogators." In June 2017, ECRF published a detailed report on the Galaa Military Prison and described how civilian detainees are treated and interrogated by different security agencies including the national security, military police, military intelligence and referred to military trials in the Galaa court, situated inside the complex.

Lawyers connected to ECRF are also acting as the Egyptian legal counsel for the family of murdered Italian Giulio Regeni, whose body bearing signs of torture was found on a desert road outside Cairo on 3 February 2016.

== Harassment and arrests ==
On 2 June 2015, Mohamed Lotfy, ECRF executive director, an Egyptian-Swiss National, was banned at Cairo International Airport from travelling to Germany and had his passport confiscated. He was on his way to Berlin invited by the Greens Party to participate in a discussion panel on the deteriorating human rights situation in Egypt at the German Federal Parliament (Bundestag). Human Rights Watch and Amnesty International have continuously called on the Egyptian authorities to lift the abusive and arbitrary travel bans.

His speech was still read at the Bundestag: "I wish i could be with you to speak on behalf of thousands who languish in inhumane conditions in jail for their political beliefs, opinions and affiliation, on whom the world knows little. My travel ban cuts a long story short, in Egypt only one voice is allowed and any critical voice is silenced. You can still hear us not because the government allows us to speak but because Egyptians continue to strive for a democratic nation that respects fundamental rights."

On 25 April 2016, Ahmed Abdallah, the chairman of the board of trustees was arrested at his home. He was accused of various charges that could have resulted in him being jailed for life. He was released in September 2016 after having spent 140 days in pre-trial detention.

On 20 October 2016, Egyptian authorities raided the office of the ECRF in Giza. Early morning on that day, four men — claiming to be affiliated with the Investment Authority — barged into the headquarters of ECRF and began searching the office without presenting a search warrant. Upon leaving the ECRF office, the four men threatened to close down the organisation and left without physically harming anyone in the process.

Between 10 and 29 September 2020, ECRF documented how the Egyptian police arrested between 571 and 735 individuals in 17 governorates, amid the nationwide anti-corruption protests and published an open-source online database with their names and location of arrest.

== Awards ==
In April 2018, ECRF received the annual 2018 award of Index on Censorship for Campaigning for Freedom of Expression. Selected from over 400 public nominations and a shortlist of 16, the 2018 Freedom of Expression Awards Fellows which exemplify courage in the face of censorship were awarded to ECRF from Egypt for Campaigning, the Museum of Dissidence from Cuba for Arts, Habari from DRC for Digital Activism and to Wendy Funes from Honduras for journalism.

On 21 November 2018, France and Germany announced that Mohamed Lotfy, executive director of ECRF, was chosen along with 14 other human rights defenders in the world to receive the Franco-German Prize for Human Rights and Rule of Law of 2018.

On 24 September 2020, ECFR was awarded the Rafto Prize by the Rafto Foundation for Human Rights for "their persistence in bravely resisting Egypt's state of fear". In the same month, ECFR was nominated by the Government of the Netherlands for the Dutch Human Rights Tulip 2020. ECRF was nominated together with 12 human rights organisations worldwide.

== See also ==
- Ibrahim Metwaly
