= Killing of Giulio Regeni =

2016 killing of an Italian student in Egypt

Giulio Regeni
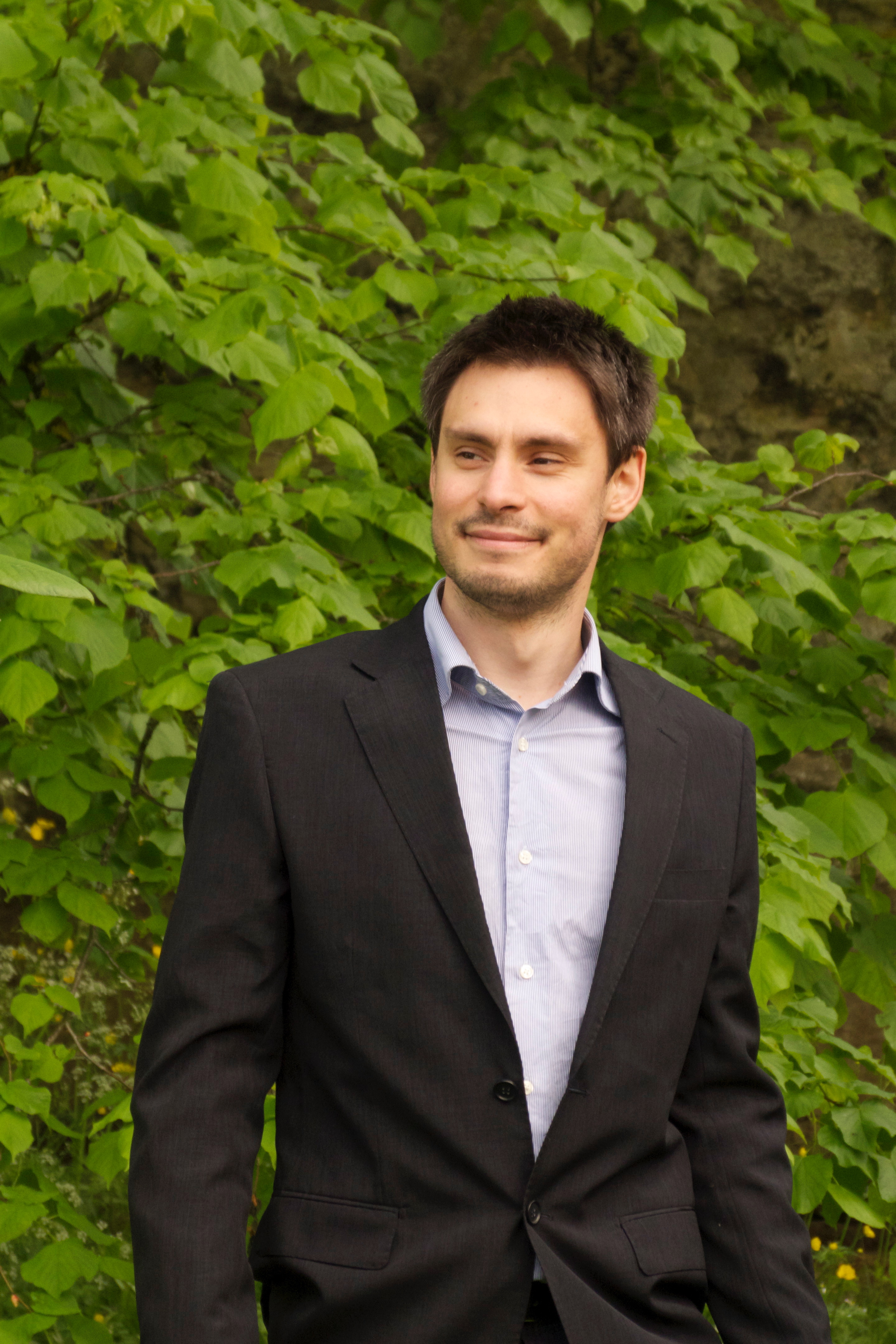
- Born: 15 January 1988; Trieste, Italy
- Disappeared: 25 January 2016 (aged 28); Cairo, Egypt
- Cause of death: Torture
- Body discovered: 3 February 2016; Cairo–Alexandria highway
- Occupation: PhD student at Girton College, Cambridge

Giulio Regeni (Italian pronunciation: [ˈdʒuːljo reˈdʒɛːni]; 15 January 1988 – c. January–February 2016) was an Italian PhD student at the University of Cambridge who was kidnapped in Cairo, Egypt, on 25 January 2016, the fifth anniversary of the Tahrir Square protests, and found dead on 3 February near an Egyptian secret service prison. His body showed clear signs of torture; in particular, some letters of the alphabet had been engraved on his skin with sharp objects, and this practise of torture had been widely documented as a distinctive trait of the Egyptian police. This evidence immediately put Abdel Fattah el-Sisi's regime under accusation.

Regeni's killing attracted national and international attention, sparking a heated political debate on the involvement of the Egyptian government itself in the affair and in the subsequent coverups through one of its security services. These suspicions gave rise to strong diplomatic tensions with Egypt. According to the European Parliament, the murder of Regeni was not an isolated event but was part of a context of torture, deaths in prison, and forced disappearances that occurred throughout Egypt during the 2010s.

The Egyptian government denied involvement in Regeni's death, blaming gangsters. Four Egyptian security officials were placed on trial in absentia in Rome in February 2024, and on 28 September 2026, one was found not guilty and three were convicted of Regeni's murder.

== Background ==
Regeni was born on 15 January 1988 in Trieste, Italy, and grew up in Fiumicello, a former comune (now Fiumicello Villa Vicentina) in the province of Udine in northeastern Italy. In 2005, Regeni obtained a scholarship from the Friuli Venezia Giulia Italian regional government to complete high school at UWC-USA in New Mexico. He was a PhD student at Girton College, Cambridge, researching Egypt's independent trade unions, and was also a former employee of the international consulting firm Oxford Analytica.

== Discovery of the body ==
Regeni's mutilated and half-naked corpse was found in a ditch alongside the Cairo–Alexandria highway on the outskirts of Cairo on 3 February 2016. His body showed signs of extreme torture; his mother recognized him "from the tip of his nose", and said she had seen in her son's tortured face "all the evil in the world". His body had contusions and abrasions all over from a severe beating; extensive bruising from kicks, punches, and assault with a stick; more than two dozen bone fractures, among them seven broken ribs, all fingers and toes, as well as legs, arms, and shoulder blades; multiple stab wounds on the body including the soles of the feet, possibly from an ice pick or awl-like instrument; numerous cuts over the entire body made with a sharp instrument suspected to be a razor; extensive cigarette burns; a larger burn mark between the shoulder blades made with a hard and hot object; a brain hemorrhage; and a cervical fracture, which ultimately caused his death.

== Investigations ==
Italian and Egyptian officials conducted separate autopsies on Regeni's corpse, with an Egyptian forensic official reporting on 1 March 2016 that he was interrogated and tortured for up to seven days at intervals of 10–14 hours before he was finally killed. The Egyptian autopsy findings were not made public. A 300-page report of the Italian autopsy findings was handed over to the public prosecutor's office in Rome and denied the earlier reports of signs of electric shocks administered to Regeni's genitals.

On 24 March 2016, in a shoot out, Egyptian police killed four men who were allegedly responsible for kidnapping Regeni. According to Egypt's Ministry of the Interior, the gang specialised in kidnapping foreigners and stealing their money. In a raid on the flat of one of the gang members, the Egyptian police claimed to have found various items that belonged to Regeni including his passport and student photo IDs; witnesses told Declan Walsh and other journalists that the gang members had been executed, not shot while riding in the van. One witness told Walsh: "One was shot as he ran, his corpse later positioned inside the van." Their link to Regeni was also suspect. According to Walsh, the "Italian investigators used phone records to show that the supposed gang leader, Tarek Abdel Fattah, was 60 miles north of Cairo the day he supposedly kidnapped Regeni." The New Cairo prosecutor's office later denied that the criminal gang was involved in his death. Regeni's passport and the other documents were handed over to Italian prosecutors on 1 November 2016 during a meeting in Cairo.

On 8 June 2016, the Italian news agency ANSA reported that Regeni's tutors at Cambridge University had declined to collaborate with the inquest into his death, to the disappointment of investigators and Regeni's family. This had been anticipated by coverage in the Italian weekly L'Espresso on 7 June 2016, which reported that Regeni's tutor Maha Abdelrahman had followed advice from University lawyers not to collaborate with the inquest. The University of Cambridge strongly rejected the claims in a statement released to Varsity, the Cambridge student newspaper. Despite commitment on behalf of Cambridge University, as of early December 2017, British authorities had denied requests by the Italian prosecutors concerning the interrogation of specific individuals in Britain; on a similar note, Abdelrahman had refused to speak to the Italian prosecutor. Such British inaction in the aftermath of the incident was later described by Cambridge Member of Parliament and Labour Party politician Daniel Zeichner as "lack of tenacity". Following the controversy that played out in the media, Abdelrahman eventually agreed to be questioned by Italian authorities and received praises from Angelino Alfano, Italy's then Minister of Foreign Affairs, for having chosen to cooperate.

In November 2020, Italian magistrates concluded the investigation into Regeni's torture and death, charging five Egyptian security officials as suspects in the case. The officials were set to face their trial in Italy. The investigation found that Regeni was allegedly tortured and murdered by the officials after his doctoral research led them to suspect him of being a spy. In October 2021, the trial of the four Egyptian police officers accused of Regeni's murder opened in Rome in absentia.

== Accusations against Egyptian officials and trial ==
Due to Regeni's research activities and left-wing politics, the Egyptian police were strongly suspected of involvement in his death in Egypt; both Egypt's media and government deny this, alleging secret undercover agents belonging to the Muslim Brotherhood in Egypt carried out the crime in order to embarrass the Egyptian government and destabilize relations between Italy and Egypt. On 21 April 2016, Reuters reported three Egyptian intelligence officials and three police sources independently claiming Regeni was in police custody at some time before his death. According to these sources, he was picked up by plainclothes police officers near Gamal Abdel Nasser metro station together with another Egyptian man on the evening of 25 January 2016. Both men were then taken in a white minibus with police license plates to Izbakiya police station in downtown Cairo. Shadowing foreigners was later dismissed by a Homeland Security official and the Interior Ministry as day-to-day work bearing no implications, and Egyptian general prosecutor Nabeel Sadek confirmed that Cairo police had received a report on Regeni on 7 January 2016, and that Egypt's National Security Agency had been monitoring Regeni. L'Espresso linked Egyptian president's son Mahmoud el-Sisi to Regeni's death, stating: "It is hard to think that el-Sisi's son was not aware of Regeni's movements before he disappeared."

According to a 2024 report by the independent investigative journalistic TV program Report, citing information close to the Italian secret services, Regeni was still alive on 29 January 2016 and the Italian government was aware that he was in danger ("We don't have him, but he's still alive...") but did nothing to save him.

On 7 December 2016, a joint statement of Egyptian and Italian prosecutors, released following a two-day summit in Rome, stated that Egyptian prosecutors had questioned the policemen who investigated Regeni's death in January, as well as those who killed the four gang members in March. On 15 August 2017, journalist Declan Walsh published in The New York Times the statement of an anonymous Obama administration official who revealed that, in the weeks after Regeni's death, the United States acquired "explosive proof that Egyptian security officials had abducted, tortured and killed Regeni", and that "Egypt's leadership was fully aware of the [death] circumstances". Walsh wrote that Italian investigators working in Egypt "were hindered at every turn. Witnesses appeared to have been coached. Surveillance footage from the subway station near Regeni’s apartment had been deleted; requests for metadata from millions of phone calls were refused on the grounds that it would compromise the constitutional rights of Egyptian citizens." After the article, the Italian government denied that the Americans provided any actionable proof; AISE told the hint from the United States was of little benefit, since it came when the autopsy and investigation had already persuaded Italian investigators of Egypt's involvement, and Americans refused to reveal anything more specific, like names of involved people or institutions.

On 21 December 2017, the Italian investigators led by Giuseppe Pignatone flew to Cairo to meet the Egyptian prosecutor Nabel Sadek and his team. The Egyptian team submitted new reports, including the progress on the recovery of surveillance cameras footage. The Italians had carefully examined and cross linked all the evidence available to them until then, and provided a detailed explanation for the facts. For the kidnapping, they reiterated and pinpointed the allegations against Major Majdi Ibrahim Abdel-Al Sharif, Captain Osan Helmy, and three other people of Egypt's National Security Agency. For the red herring, which included the killings on 24 March 2016, they blamed captain Mahmud Hendy and other people of the local police. A witness spoke in May 2019 and said that he was in a cafe in Nairobi, the capital of Kenya, in August 2017, where he heard Egyptian officials discussing the Regeni affair. After spying on an exchange of business cards, he heard that the officer who claimed to have been personally involved in Regeni's kidnapping and death was in fact the then 35-years-old Major Majdi Ibrahim Abdel-Al Sharif. According to the eyewitness account, they believed Regeni was a British spy, and reported that the officer said he had to hit and slap Regeni after loading him into the police van. The Italian investigators listened to the witness and credited his reconstruction of the events with some reliability. In fact, the Major was already among the suspects.

In December 2020, four agents of Egypt's National Security Agency—Major Madgi Ibrahim Abdelal Sharif, Major General Tariq Sabir, Colonel Athar Kamel Mohamed Ibrahim, and Colonel Uhsam Helmi—were charged by Italian prosecutors with the aggravated kidnapping of Regeni. Major Sharif was also charged with conspiracy to commit aggravated murder. In May 2021, the judge Pier Luigi Balestrieri ordered a trial, which was the ultimate resort for the Italian authorities, to begin in October 2021. It was ruled that they would be tried by the prosecutors in Italy on charges of torturing, kidnapping, and murdering Regeni. On 14 October 2021, the Third Corte d'Assise of Rome invalidated the trial, stating that the three members of the National Security Agency had not been notified about their charges and that therefore the trial could not begin. As a result, the case returned to the judge of the preliminary hearing. On 20 September 2023, the Constitutional Court of Italy ruled that the four Egyptian officials can be put on trial, notwithstanding the resistance of the Egyptian authorities, which foreclosed delivering a formal notification to the defendants.

The trial started in absentia in Rome in February 2024. It was temporarily suspended pending a query by the defence to the Constitutional Court. On September 28, 2026, Major Magdi Ibrahim Abdelal Sharif, Colonel Ather Kamal Mohamed Ibrahim and Colonel Hisham Helmy were convicted of the kidnapping and murder of Regeni and sentenced to 10 years in prison. Magdi Ibrahim Abdelal Sharif was acquitted.

== Reactions ==
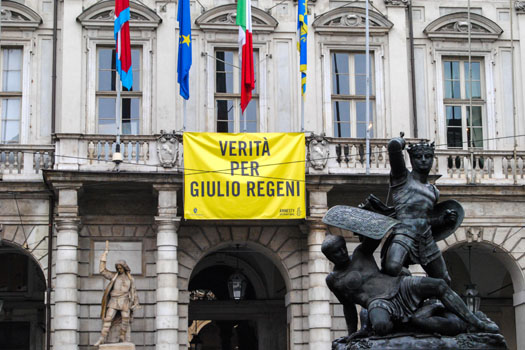
Banner reading "Verità per Giulio Regeni" ("Truth for Giulio Regeni") on the city hall in Turin, Italy

Regeni's torture and killing sparked global outrage, with more than 4,600 academics signing a petition calling for an investigation into his death and into the many disappearances that take place in Egypt each month. On 24 February 2016, Amnesty International Italy launched a campaign called Verità per Giulio Regeni ("Truth for Giulio Regeni"). UK Parliament petition No. 120832 was created by Hannah Waddilove, a former colleague of Regeni's at Oxford Analytica, in February 2016. British involvement was solicited on the rationale that freedom of thought, expression, and press are not meaningful if they cannot be backed by freedom of research, hence active steps were expected from the United Kingdom in order to protect operations carried out by personnel belonging to its universities. The petition reached 10,000 signatures by April 2016, and the Parliament of the United Kingdom renewed their offer of assistance. An online petition was also started on Change.org; it received more than 100,000 signatures. On 10 March 2016, the European Parliament in Strasbourg passed a motion for a resolution condemning Regeni's torture and killing and the ongoing human rights abuses of the el-Sisi government in Egypt. The resolution was passed with an overwhelming majority.

In April 2016, Italy recalled its ambassador to Egypt due to a lack of co-operation during the investigation from the Egyptian authorities. In a 14 April 2016 editorial, The New York Times attacked France, calling the silence in the face of Italy's requests to put pressure on Egypt "shameful". In May 2016, Italian weekly magazine L'Espresso set up a secure platform based on GlobaLeaks technology to collect testimonials about torture and human rights abuse from Egyptian whistleblowers, and to seek justice for Regeni and for murder victims in Egypt. On 25 January 2017, the first anniversary of his disappearance, thousands of people gathered to remember Regeni in Rome, Milan, Fiumicello, and other Italian towns. On 1 May 2017, Pope Francis said that the Vatican was taking steps to investigate the situation. He stated: "The Holy See has taken some steps. I will not say how or where, but we have taken some steps." From 2016, el-Sisi had promised Regeni's parents his personal involvement to establish the truth on the death of their son; three years later, Paola and Claudio Regeni published a hard reply, stating: "We cannot be satisfied by your condolences anymore, nor by your failed promises."

Girton College has flown its collegiate flag at half-mast every year on 25 January and 3 February, the anniversary of Regeni's abduction and the discovery of his body. On 25 January 2026, on the 10th anniversary, a vigil outside Great St Mary's Church was organised by the Cambridge University Italian Society and Cambridge University Amnesty. The college's chapel was also open during the anniversary period to allow for candles to be lit in honour of Regeni. In London, a group of citizens, activists and academics marched from the Embassy of Egypt to the Embassy of Italy.

== See also ==
- Academic Freedom in the Middle East
- Detention of Patrick Zaki
- Ibrahim Metwaly
- List of solved missing person cases (2010s)
- List of unsolved murders (2000–present)
- Majdi Ibrahim Abdel-Al Sharif (in Italian)

== Bibliography ==
- Beccaria, Antonella; Marcucci, Gigi (2016). Morire al Cairo. I misteri dell'uccisione di Giulio Regeni (in Italian). Rome: Castelvecchi. ISBN 978-88-6944-652-8 – via Google Books.
- Declich, Lorenzo (2016). Giulio Regeni, le verità ignorate. La dittatura di al-Sisi e i rapporti tra Italia ed Egitto (in Italian). Rome: Alegre. ISBN 978-88-98841-45-5 – via Google Books.

== Filmography ==
- Bonini, Carlo; Foschini, Giuliano (2017). Nove giorni al Cairo: tortura e omicidio di Giulio Regeni [Nine days at Cairo: torture and murder of Giulio Regeni] (webseries). La Repubblica (in Italian).
