= Turriaco =

Turriaco Turiac (Venetian)
- Comune
- Comune di Turriaco
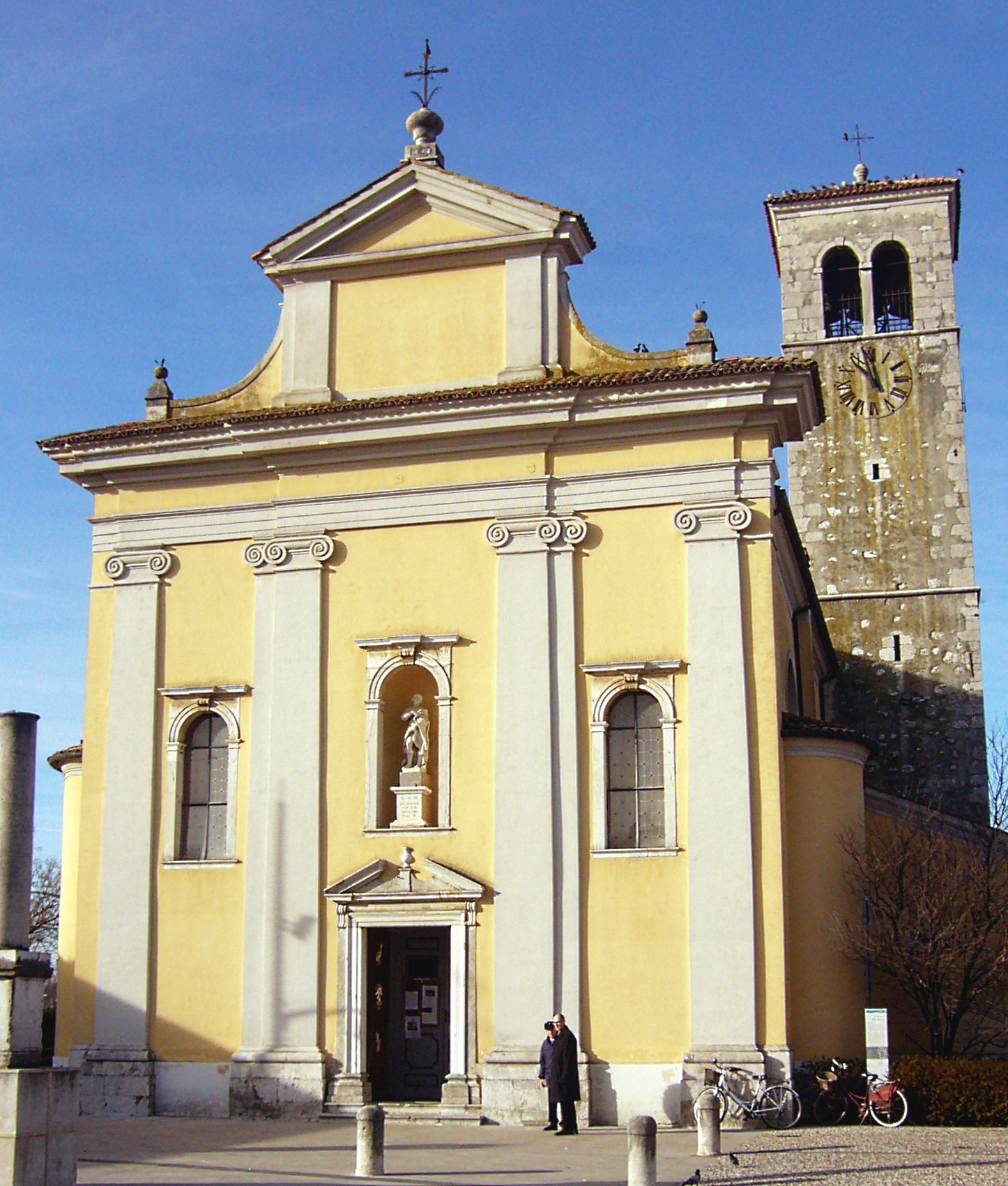
- Church of San Rocco

- Coat of arms

- Location within Italy Location within Friuli-Venezia Giulia
- Coordinates: 45°49′N 13°27′E
- Country: Italy
- Region: Friuli-Venezia Giulia
- Province: Gorizia (GO)

Government
  - Mayor: Nicola Pieri (since 9 June 2024)

Area
  - Total: 5 km^{2} (1.9 sq mi)
- Elevation: 12 m (39 ft)

Population (July 2025)
  - Total: 2,774
  - Density: 550/km^{2} (1,400/sq mi)
- Demonym: Turriachesi
- Time zone: UTC+1 (CET)
  - Summer (DST): UTC+2 (CEST)
- Postal code: 34070
- Dialing code: 0481
- Patron saint: Saint Roch
- Website: Comune di Turriaco

Turriaco (Bisiacco: Turiac) is a town and comune (municipality) in the Regional decentralization entity of Gorizia, Friuli-Venezia Giulia, northeast Italy. It is located near the Isonzo River.

Turriaco borders the following municipalities: Fiumicello Villa Vicentina (UD), Ruda (UD), San Canzian d'Isonzo, San Pier d'Isonzo.

== History ==
Its name comes from the ancient Latin name Turris Aquae, meaning "Water Tower".

The village of Turriaco is known for its typical country-styled houses with stone entryways and window frames. A well-known example of this style is the 17th century Palace Priuli, site of a military command post during World War I, along with Palace Mangilli.

== Monuments and places of interest ==
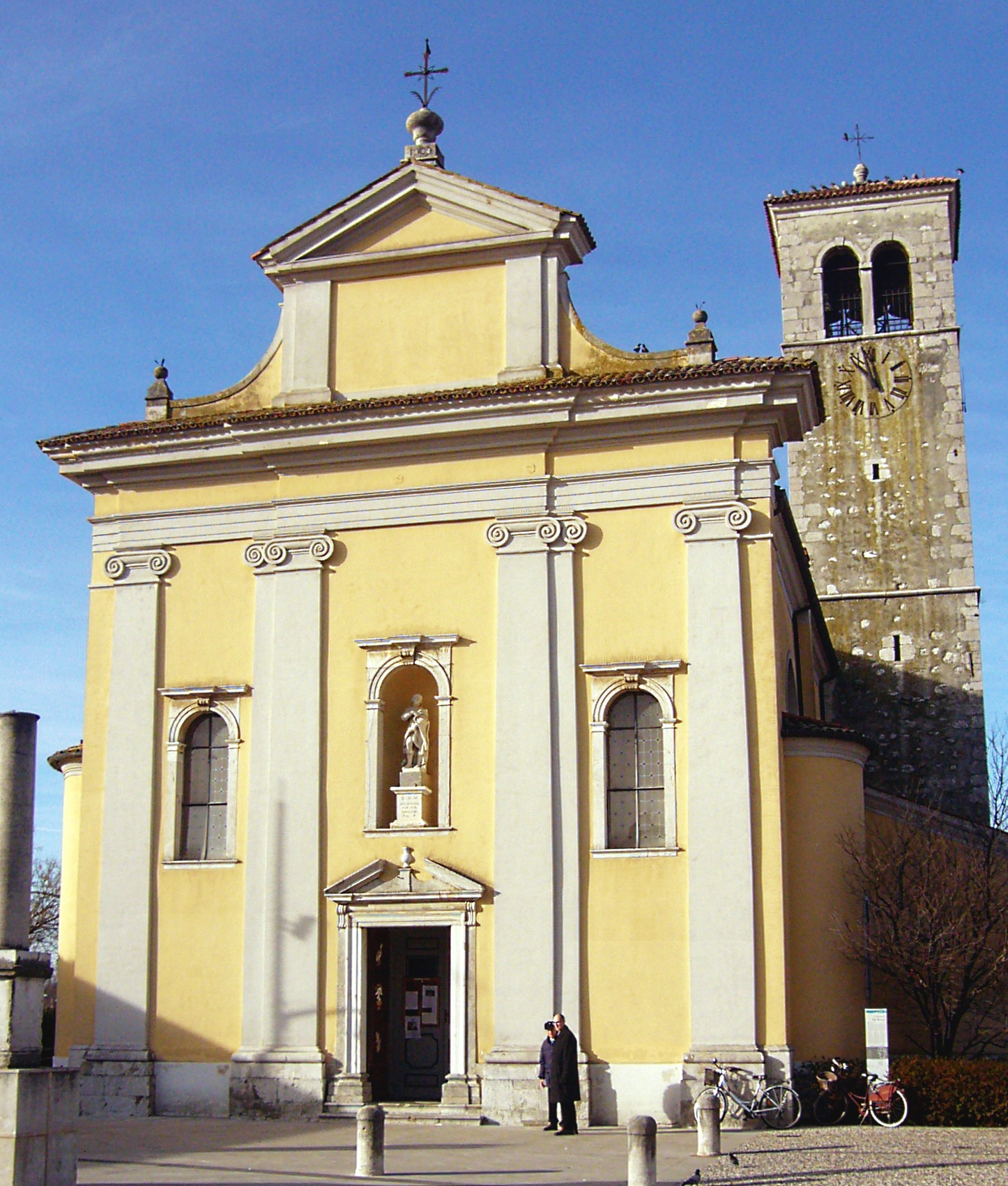
The parish church of San Rocco

- Church of San Rocco: it was built between the late seventeenth century and the first half of eighteenth century in the same place of the previous church and preserves several works that worth a visit.
- Villa Tiberio Priuli, stands facing the church that was built in the Baroque era (17th century).

=== Natural area ===
- The Isonzo Municipal Park was established by the Municipality of Turriaco in 2000 and is recognized by the Region, which provides funding for its management and new projects. Over the years, several projects have been carried out to enhance and redevelop the area, including vegetation, cycle/pedestrian paths, and a children's play area, creating a playful and welcoming environment completely immersed in nature.

== Demographic evolution ==
Historical population

Year	Pop.	±%
1861	?	—
1871	?	—
1881	?	—
1901	?	—
1911	?	—
1921	1,618	—

Year	Pop.	±%
1931	1,778	+9.9%
1936	1,936	+8.9%
1951	2,378	+22.8%
1961	2,265	−4.8%
1971	2,190	−3.3%
1981	2,245	+2.5%

Year	Pop.	±%
1991	2,163	−3.7%
2001	2,437	+12.7%
2011	2,780	+14.1%
2021	2,806	+0.9%

Source: Data from ISTAT
