= Fiumicello Villa Vicentina =

Fiumicello Villa Vicentina Flumisel Vile Visintine (Friulian)
- Comune
- Comune di Fiumicello Villa Vicentina
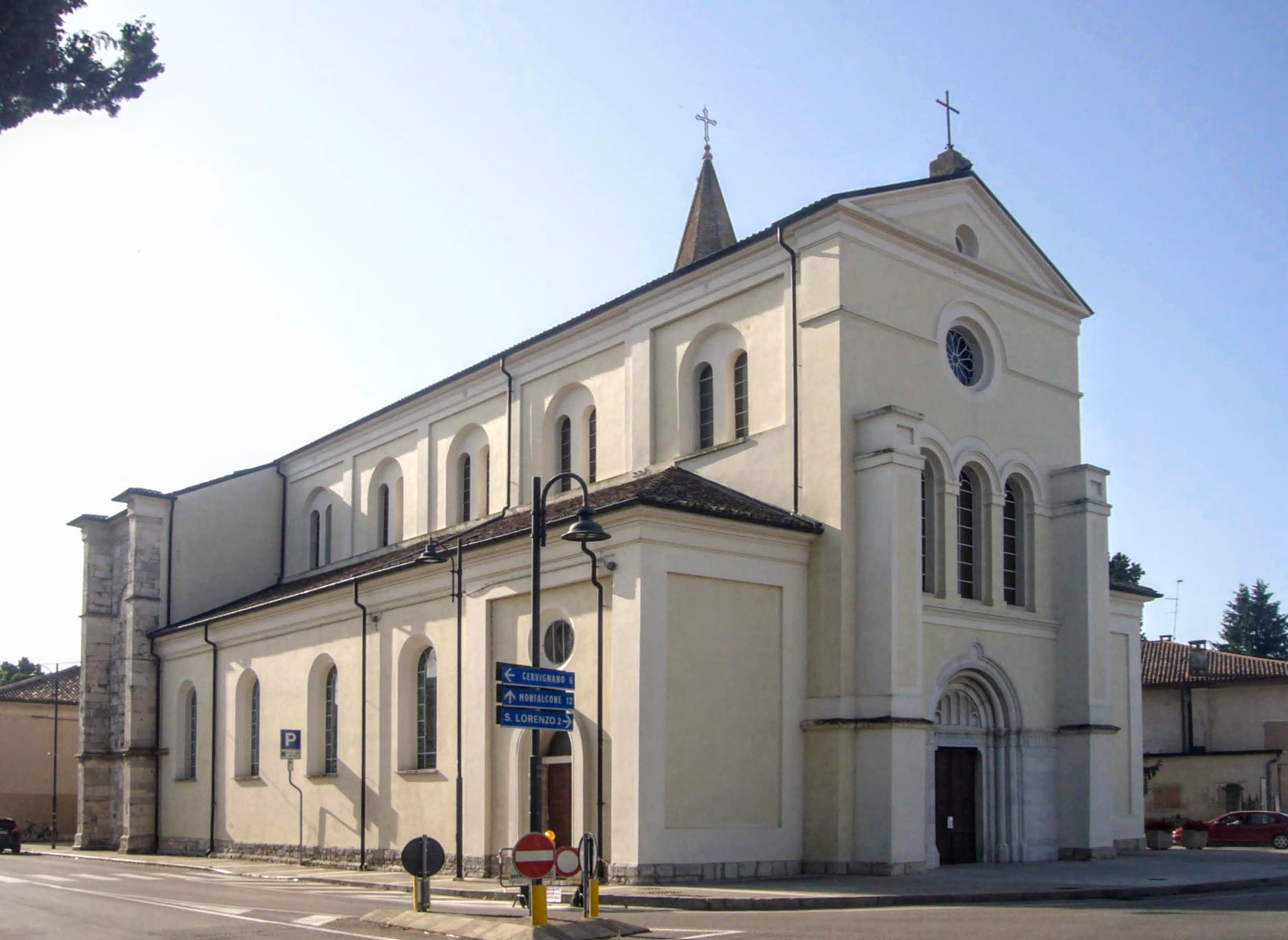
- The church of the San Valentino hamlet

- Location of the municipality of Fiumicello Villa Vicentina in the former province of Udine

- Location within Italy Location within Friuli-Venezia Giulia
- Coordinates: 45°47′N 13°25′E
- Country: Italy
- Region: Friuli-Venezia Giulia
- Province: Udine (UD)
- Frazioni: Fiumicello, San Valentino, Papariano, San Lorenzo, Sant'Antonio, Capo di Sopra, Villa Vicentina

Government
  - Mayor: Alessandro Dijust

Area
  - Total: 28.80 km^{2} (11.12 sq mi)
- Elevation: 6 m (20 ft)

Population (31 May 2025) fiumicellesi and vicentinesi
  - Total: 6,257
  - Density: 217.3/km^{2} (562.7/sq mi)
- Time zone: UTC+1 (CET)
  - Summer (DST): UTC+2 (CEST)
- Postal code: 31090
- Dialing code: 0431

Fiumicello Villa Vicentina (Friulian: Flumisel Vile Visintine) is a comune (municipality) in the Regional decentralization entity of Udine in the Italian region of Friuli-Venezia Giulia. It was established on 1 February 2018 by the merger of the municipalities of Fiumicello and Villa Vicentina.

Fiumicello Villa Vicentina borders the following municipalities: Aquileia, Cervignano del Friuli, Grado (GO), Ruda, San Canzian d'Isonzo (GO), Terzo d'Aquileia, Turriaco (GO)

== History ==
On 24 September 2017, a referendum was held in both municipalities which gave a positive outcome (overall 1353 votes in favor and 1077 against), although the majority of votes in favor was achieved only in the municipality of Fiumicello (in Villa Vicentina the "No" prevailed, with 52.53% of the votes).

On 15 November 2017, the Fifth Permanent Commission of the Regional Council of Friuli Venezia Giulia, taking into account the overall result of the referendum vote, expressed a favorable opinion on draft law no. 235 presented by the Regional Council on 7 November 2017 establishing the municipality of Fiumicello Villa Vicentina and this led to the new municipality becoming operational from 1 February 2018.

== Symbols ==
The coat of arms and banner of the municipality of Fiumicello Villa Vicentina were granted by decree of the President of the Republic of 1 August 2019. The coat of arms of the new municipality brings together the emblems of Fiumicello and Villa Vicentina. The banner is a blue and yellow banner.

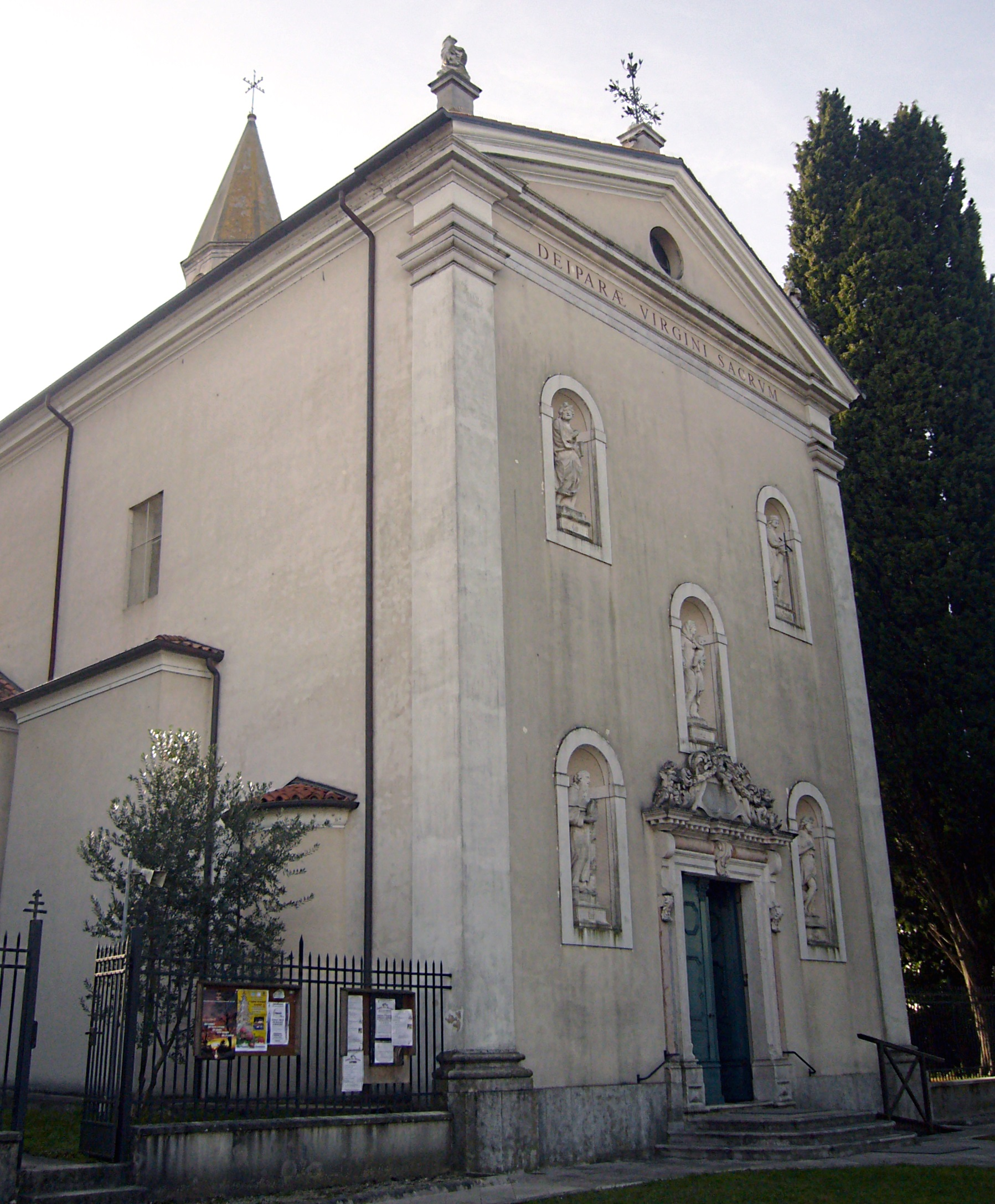
Church of Santa Maria

== Monuments and places of interest ==
- Church of Santa Maria: it is the parish church of Villa Vicentina, a hamlet of the scattered municipality of Fiumicello Villa Vicentina, in the province of Udine and archdiocese of Gorizia; it is part of the deanery of Aquileia.
- Church of San Valentino in the municipal headquarters
- Church of San Lorenzo in the hamlet of the same name
- Church of Maria Santissima Regina in Papariano

== Languages and dialects ==
In Fiumicello Villa Vicentina, alongside the Italian language, the population uses the Friulian language. Pursuant to resolution no. 2680 of 3 August 2001 of the Council of the autonomous Region of Friuli-Venezia Giulia, the Municipality is included in the territorial scope of protection of the Friulian language for the purposes of the application of law 482/99, regional law 15/96 and regional law 29/2007. The Friulian language spoken in Fiumicello Villa Vicentina is among the variants belonging to the Gorizia Friulian. In addition to the Friulian language, the territory also has other dialects that are spoken by the population located in Fiumicello Villa Vicentina thanks to the strong linguistic union of the country.

== Demographic evolution ==
Historical population

Year	Pop.	±%
1861	?	—
1871	?	—
1881	?	—
1901	?	—
1911	?	—
1921	5,164	—

Year	Pop.	±%
1931	5,097	−1.3%
1936	5,196	+1.9%
1951	5,928	+14.1%
1961	5,471	−7.7%
1971	5,280	−3.5%
1981	5,664	+7.3%

Year	Pop.	±%
1991	5,620	−0.8%
2001	5,639	+0.3%
2011	6,408	+13.6%
2021	6,299	−1.7%

Source: Data from ISTAT

== Culture ==
=== Events ===
In the month of July the "Regional Peach Exhibition" is organised. During this festival, competitions are organized for who has the most beautiful orchard, but also who has the best looking peaches.

The municipality of Fiumicello Villa Vicentina (and before it the municipality of Fiumicello) is included in the management body of the Foce dell'Isonzo Nature Reserve together with the municipalities of Staranzano (leader), San Canzian and Grado. In the Isonzo park pertaining to Fiumicello Villa Vicentina the AESON arts in nature festival has been organized every year in July since 2008.

== Economy ==
Originally marshy land, it follows the natural evolution from a fishermen's area (given the notable concentration of waterways) to shepherds up to its almost "natural" propensity for agriculture which is still today an important driver of the Fiumicello economy, also in light of the transformations of the companies, once dedicated almost exclusively to cereal cultivation, today oriented in particular towards fruit and vegetables and interesting experiments in greenhouse floral cultivation.

== Anthropic geography ==
The municipality of Fiumicello Villa Vicentina includes the localities of Borgo Candaletis, Borgo Malborghetto, Borgo Pacco, Borgo Sandrigo, Capo di Sopra, Papariano, San Lorenzo, San Valentino, Sant'Antonio and Villa Vicentina.
