= Aminetou Mint El-Moctar =

Mauritanian politician and women's rights activist

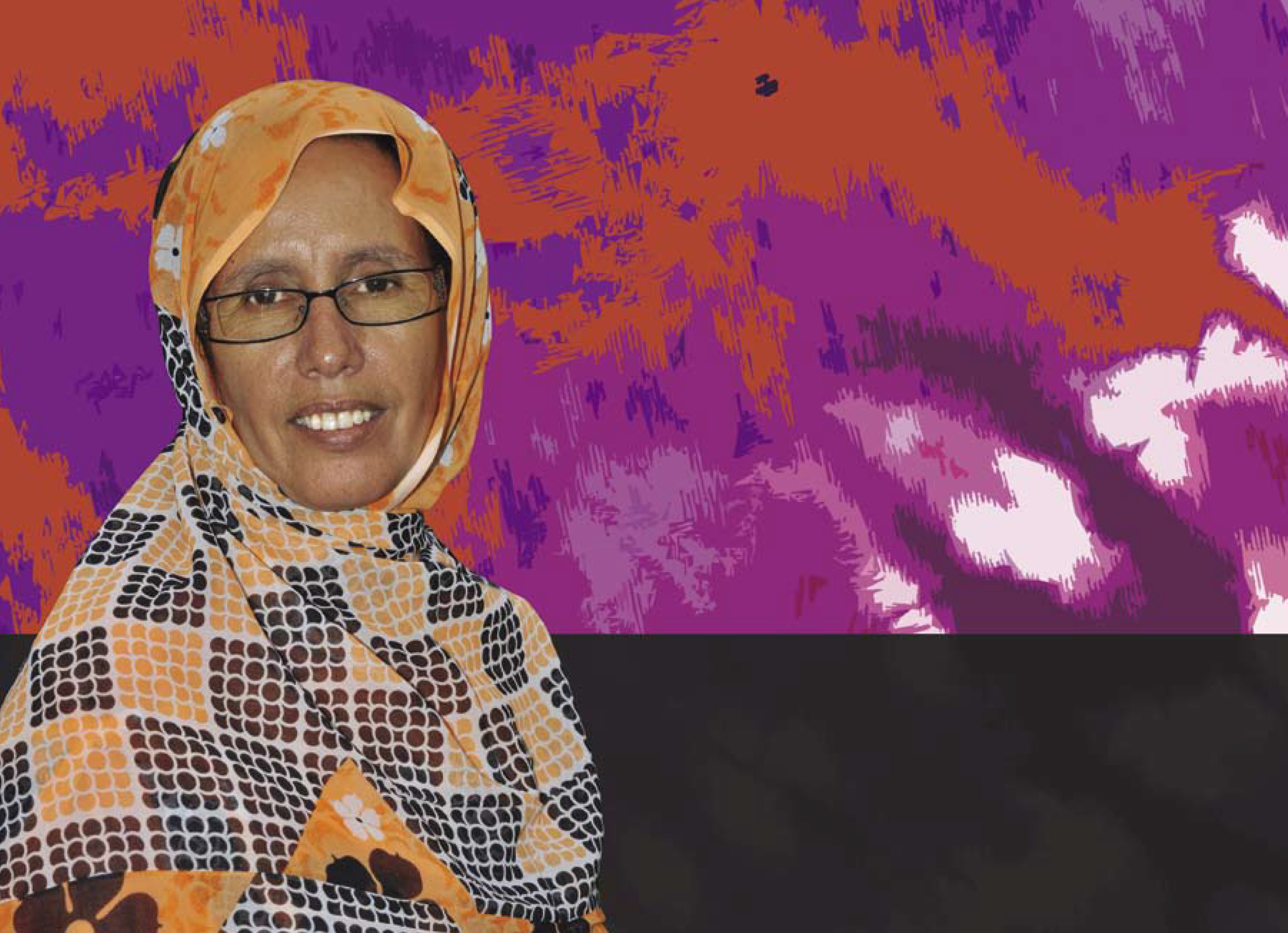
- Born: Aminetou Mint Ely; 13 December 1956 (age 69); Nouakchott
- Occupations: Political activist, feminist and abolitionist
- Organization: The Association of Women Heads of Households (AFCF)
- Honours: Legion d'Honneur

Aminetou Mint El-Moctar (Arabic: أمينيتو بنت المختار; born 13 December 1956) is a Mauritanian politician and women's rights activist. She was shortlisted for the Nobel Peace Prize in 2015 and is the first Mauritanian woman to be considered for the award.

== Early life ==
Mint El-Moctar was born in Nouakchott on 13 December 1956 and grew up in an upper-class family of eight children. At the age of eleven, her father arranged marriage for her, which she strongly objected to; however, the marriage went ahead, and her first child was born when she was 14.

As a teenager she was involved with Marxist protests and was arrested several times by police. At this point, she also stood up for the rights of her family's slaves, encouraging them to take their own freedom and to leave. After leaving her husband, and unable to attend school, she worked in a variety of low-paid jobs, including cigarette seller, switchboard operator, and as a social worker.

== Activism & Feminism ==
El-Moctar's activism was formed early - standing up for the rights of others from a young age. Activism, speaking out against the government, especially by women, is unpopular with the authorities in Mauritania. In 1974 she set up the Association of Mauritanian Women Democrats. Between 1989 and 1991 she was a member of The International Democratic Movement to Defend the Oppressed.

In 1991, El-Moctar was arrested and tortured because she spoke out against the massacre of black minority Mauritanians in Nouadhibou. Her involvement led to the creation of the Committee on Solidarity with the Victims of Repression in Mauritania. She has lobbied for a quota in government for the involvement of women in political decision-making - it stands at 20% in 2019.

In 2009 she spearheaded protests against the sex trafficking of young women to the Arabian Peninsula. She has spoken out against the early marriage of girls and especially the cultural practice of force-feeding young women to become fat ready for marriage, leading to obesity and diabetes.

In order to further the cause of human rights she states that: "We need to continue to raise taboo issues in order to break them, to make people aware of their rights and duties and, above all, to denounce all inhuman, degrading and discriminatory practices towards people, especially women and children." El-Moctar considers herself a feminist and wants to encourage women from across Africa to come together in the fights against male domination.

== Fatwa ==
In 2014, a fatwa was launched against her by the imam of a Mauritanian radical Islamist movement, who call themselves Ahbab Errassoul (The Prophet's Friends). The order was issued against El-Moctar because she publicly defending a blogger who was accused by Ahbab Errassoul of apostasy. The fatwa called for the killing and gouging out of El-Moctar's eye, simply because she demanded a fair trial for the blogger.

== The Association of Women Heads of Households ==
UNESCO's Soft Power Today Manifesto, featuring El-Moctar (pdf).

On 17 April 1999, El-Moctar founded The Association of Women Heads of Households (AFCF, French: Association des femmes chefs de familles), which she chairs. From its outset, the AFCF has been designed to reflect the diversity of Mauritania, including Arab, Berber, Haratin, Pulaar, Soninke and Wolof women. The AFCF has 12,000 members, six rescue centers for victims, 168 social workers, four lawyers and a contact person in every city in Mauritania. In 2019, the AFCF proposed new legislation to the Mauritanian government to defend women rights, in particular to introduce harsher sentences for rape.

The proposal was rejected by the Mauritanian government as it did not comply with Sharia law.

== Awards and honors ==
El-Moctar was awarded the Human Rights Prize of the French Republic in 2006. In 2010 she was awarded the Legion d'Honneur for her work in defending human rights in Mauritania. In 2015, El-Moctar was nominated for the Nobel Peace Prize, along with other anti-slavery campaigners Biram Dah Abeid and Boubacar Ould Messaoud.

Other recognition includes:

- Heroes Prize (USA)
- 500 Most Influential Personalities in the Muslim World
- Prize from the Young Chamber of Commerce of Mauritania
