= Villa Vicentina =

- Frazione
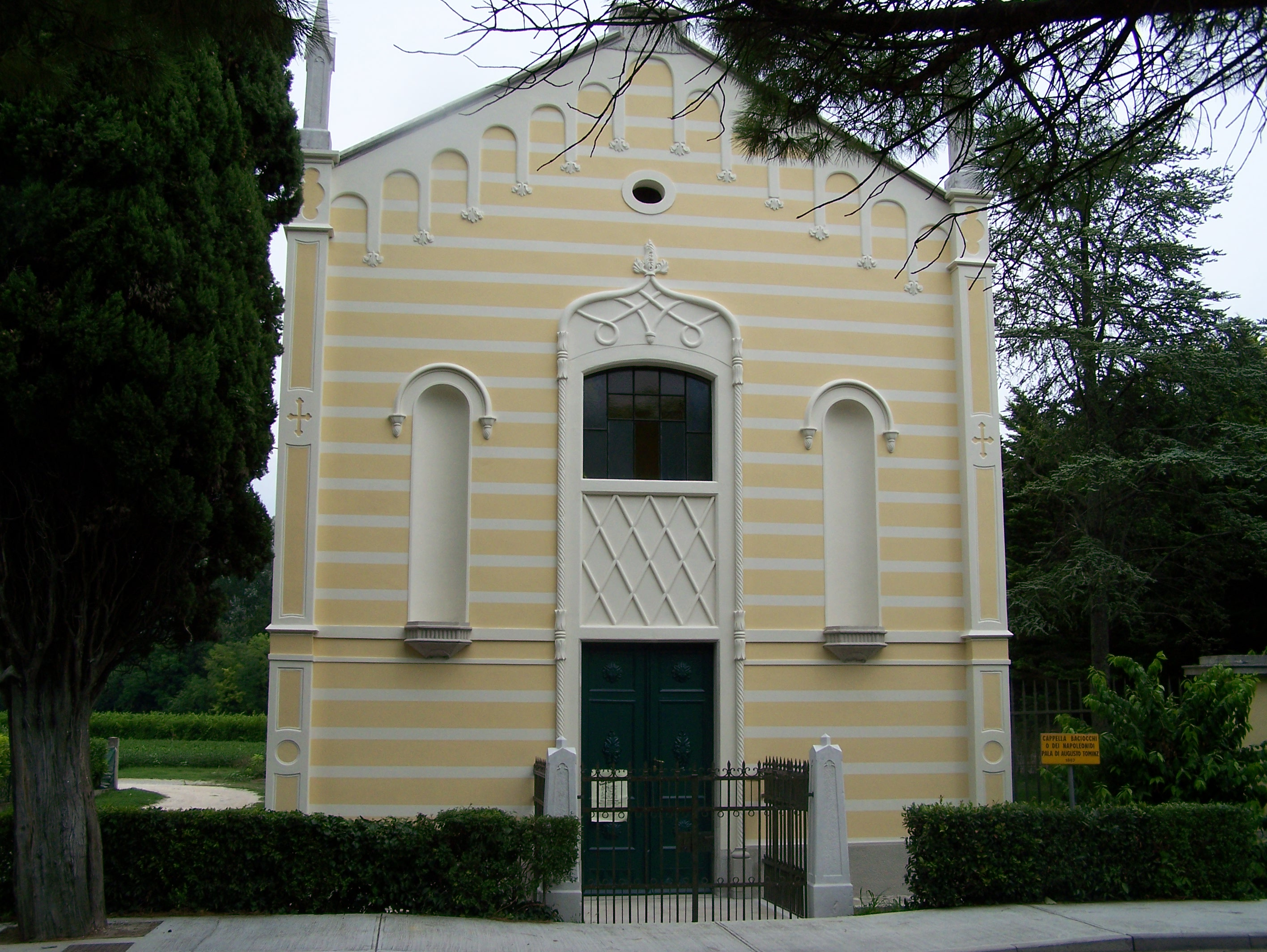
- Cappella Baciocchi.

- Location of Villa Vicentina in Italy
- Coordinates: 45°49′N 13°24′E
- Country: Italy
- Region: Friuli-Venezia Giulia
- Province: Udine (UD)
- Comune: Fiumicello Villa Vicentina

Area
  - Total: 5.55 km^{2} (2.14 sq mi)
- Elevation: 9 m (30 ft)

Population (March 2009)
  - Total: 1,399
  - Density: 252/km^{2} (653/sq mi)
- Time zone: UTC+1 (CET)
  - Summer (DST): UTC+2 (CEST)
- Postal code: 33059
- Dialing code: 0431

Villa Vicentina (Friulian: Vile Visintine, locally: La Vila) is a frazione of Fiumicello Villa Vicentina in the Province of Udine in the Italian region Friuli-Venezia Giulia, located about 35 kilometres (22 mi) northwest of Trieste and about 30 kilometres (19 mi) southeast of Udine.

The Villa Ciardi, in the town's territory, was the summer residence of Elisa Bonaparte Baciocchi, sister of Napoleon Bonaparte.

== Twin towns ==
- Colpo, France
