= Campolongo Tapogliano =

Campolongo Tapogliano Cjamplunc Tapoian (Friulian)
- Comune
- Comune di Campolongo Tapogliano
- Location within Italy Location within Friuli-Venezia Giulia
- Coordinates: 45°53′N 13°24′E
- Country: Italy
- Region: Friuli-Venezia Giulia
- Province: Udine (UD)
- Frazioni: Campolongo al Torre, Cavenzano, San Leonardo, Tapogliano

Area
  - Total: 9.63 km^{2} (3.72 sq mi)
- Elevation: 16 m (52 ft)

Population (2008)
  - Total: 1,202
  - Density: 125/km^{2} (323/sq mi)
- Demonym: Campolonghesi / tapoglianesi
- Time zone: UTC+1 (CET)
  - Summer (DST): UTC+2 (CEST)
- Postal code: 33040
- Dialing code: 0431
- Website: Official website

Campolongo Tapogliano (Friulian: Cjamplunc Tapoian) is a comune (municipality) in the Regional decentralization entity of Udine in the Italian region of Friuli-Venezia Giulia. It was created in 2009 by the fusion of the former municipalities of Campolongo al Torre and Tapogliano.

== Twin towns ==
Campolongo Tapogliano is twinned with:

- Montgiscard, France, since 2005
