= Ibrahim Metwaly =

Egyptian human rights activist

Ibrahim Metwaly Hegazy is an Egyptian lawyer and human rights activist and a member of the Egyptian Commission for Rights and Freedoms. In September 2017, Metwaly was detained by the Egyptian security services. He had been investigating the death in Egypt of the Italian student Giulio Regeni. On 10 September 2017, Metwaly was thrown into Tora Prison.

His detention was criticised by the governments of the UK, Canada, Germany, Italy, and the Netherlands.

== See also ==
- Lists of solved missing person cases
