= San Pier d'Isonzo =

San Pier d'Isonzo San Piero (Venetian)
- Comune
- Comune di San Pier d'Isonzo
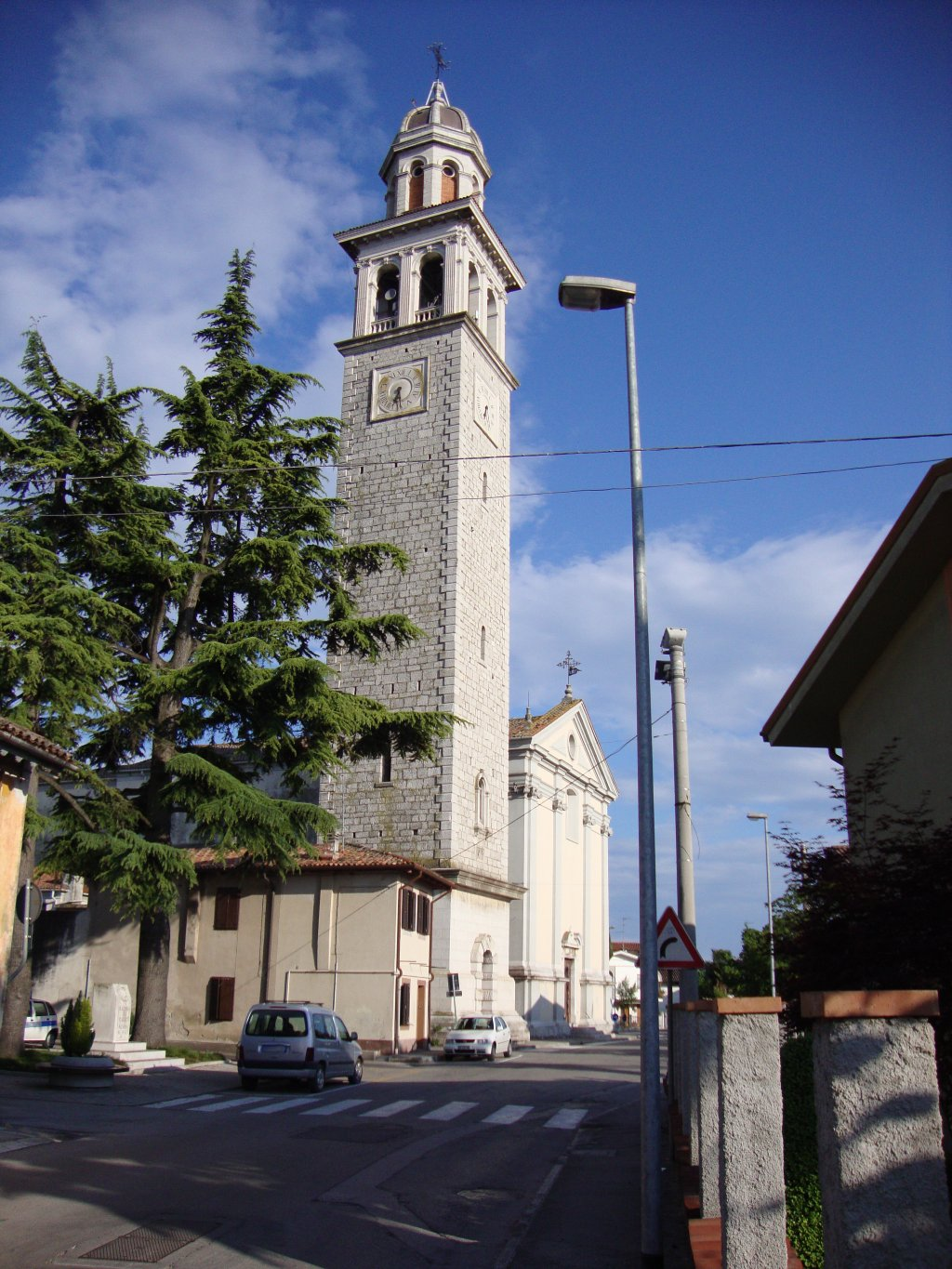

- Coat of arms

- Location within Italy Location within Friuli-Venezia Giulia
- Coordinates: 45°51′N 13°28′E
- Country: Italy
- Region: Friuli-Venezia Giulia
- Province: Gorizia (GO)
- Frazioni: Cassegliano, San Zanut

Government
  - Mayor: Claudio Bignolin (since 2021)

Area
  - Total: 9 km^{2} (3.5 sq mi)
- Elevation: 18 m (59 ft)

Population (2024)
  - Total: 1,936
  - Density: 220/km^{2} (560/sq mi)
- Time zone: UTC+1 (CET)
  - Summer (DST): UTC+2 (CEST)
- Postal code: 34070
- Dialing code: 0481
- Patron saint: Sts. Peter and Paul

San Pier d'Isonzo (Bisiacco: San Piero; Friulian: San Pieri dai Bisiacs) is a town and comune (municipality) in the Regional decentralization entity of Gorizia, Friuli-Venezia Giulia, northeast Italy. It borders Turriaco. The village first appears in a patriarchal document in 1247.
