= Mohamed Lotfy (human rights defender) =

Egyptian human rights activist

Personal details
- Born: Mohamed Lotfy; 29 July 1981 (age 44); Cairo, Egypt
- Spouse: Amal Fathy (m. 2014)
- Children: Zidane
- Education: Université de Genève
- Awards: Franco-German Prize for Human Rights and Rule of Law in 2018

Mohamed Lotfy, a human rights defender, is the co-founder and executive director of the Egyptian Commission for Rights and Freedoms (ECRF), an organisation that works in several governorates of Egypt in the defence of human rights in the country. Before moving back to Cairo and co-founding ECRF in 2013 he was a human rights researcher at Amnesty International in London .

On 2 June 2015, a travel ban was imposed on Mohamed Lotfy by Egyptian state security. The human rights defender was stopped on that day by state security at Cairo International Airport as he attempted to travel to Berlin to speak on the situation of human rights in Egypt at a round table convened by the Green Party. The round table was organised to coincide with Egyptian President Abdel Fattah El-Sisi's visit to Germany. The European Parliament, through the head of the Human Rights Committee, called on the Egyptian Authorities to lift the restrictions.

On 20 October 2016, Egyptian authorities raided the office of the Egyptian Commission for Rights and Freedoms (ECRF) in Giza, Egypt.
