= Campolongo al Torre =

- Frazione
- Location of Campolongo al Torre in Italy
- Coordinates: 45°52′N 13°23′E
- Country: Italy
- Region: Friuli-Venezia Giulia
- Province: Province of Udine (UD)
- Comune: Campolongo Tapogliano

Area
  - Total: 5.9 km^{2} (2.3 sq mi)
- Elevation: 16 m (52 ft)

Population (2007)
  - Total: 775
  - Density: 130/km^{2} (340/sq mi)
- Demonym: Campolonghesi
- Time zone: UTC+1 (CET)
  - Summer (DST): UTC+2 (CEST)
- Postal code: 33040
- Dialing code: 0431
- Patron saint: San Rocco
- Saint day: 16 August

Campolongo al Torre (Friulian: Cjamplunc) is a former comune of the Province of Udine in the Italian region Friuli-Venezia Giulia, located about 40 km (25 mi) northwest of Trieste and about 25 km (16 mi) southeast of Udine. Since 2009 it has been one of the two principal centres of Campolongo Tapogliano, a municipality formed by its merger with the former comune of Tapogliano.

== History ==
=== Ancient era ===
The lands near Campolongo appear to have been settled dating back to Roman times. The first mention dates to the nearby town of Tapogliano. Gravestones, bearing Latin inscriptions which indicate that name of the nearby town derives from the Latin "Tappulius (Tappulus)", a possible Roman assignee of these lands. That settlement is probably a consequence to that of the establishment of Aquileia (ca. 180 BC). These settlements served as strategic frontier outposts at the north-east corner of the Italian peninsula, intended to protect the Veneti, allies of Rome at that time. In the next centuries the Roman roads of Via Postumia, Via Popilia, Via Gemina and Via Annia would link the area to the rest of the Italian peninsula and beyond.

=== Middle Ages ===
The area was devastated in the fifth century by Germanic and other invasions by Alaric I and Attila. The Roman inhabitants fled en masse to the lagoons, in Veneti and so laid the foundations of the city of Venice. Then the Lombards wasted the countryside a second time in 590 but also establishing the Duchy of Friuli in the vicinity. Lombards ruled until 774, when Charlemagne conquered the Friuli and made it into a Frankish state under Eric of Friuli.

Under Charlemagne the new Patriarchate of Aquileia was established. The patriarchate would become one of the largest dioceses. However, in the 10th century, the Friuli area would suffer under the raids of the Magyars, which would contribute to the decline of imperial control and increase the authority of the patriarchs. By the 11th century, the patriarch of Aquileia had grown strong enough to assert temporal sovereignty over Friuli and Aquileia and the Holy Roman Emperor Henry IV gave the region to the patriarch as a feudal possession albeit constantly disputed by the territorial nobility. In the 14th century the Patriarchal State known as the Patria del Friuli reached its largest extension, stretching from the Piave river to the Julian Alps and northern Istria. The seat of the Patriarchate of Aquileia had been transferred first to Cividale and then in 1238 to Udine.

It was during this time that the name of Campolongo is encountered for the first time in a note relating to March 1327: "Taxes collected by the Aquileia on the massari (farmers/settlers) of Carripa and Dapiferato, on the beheast of the Patriarch, as they are shown in the following note in Budrio, Orasaria, Campolongo and Visco, San Pietro d'Isonzo ...". Thus in 1327 in Campolongo there were "massari" subject to the Patriarch of Aquileia. Then the documents are silent for a period.

However, Friuli had to cope with the rising naval power of the Republic of Venice. Since the transfer of the patriarchal residence to Udine, the Venetians and the Patriarchate engaged in political and physical warfare. From about 1400, Venice began to enlarge its influence by occupying Aquileia/Friulian territory. By 1411 this turned into a war which was to mark the end of the Patriarchate. In December an Imperial army captured Udine; in 1419 the Venetians conquered Cividale; and, then Gemona, San Daniele, Venzone and Tolmezzo followed. The former Patriarchate territories were secularized by Venice and under the Domini di Terraferma, the territories stretching from the Adriatic Sea to the Alps, were ceded to the Republic.

Campolongo was thus ruled by the Republic of Venice in 1420. Campolongo was administered by its own degani and by Venetian "notaries". Friuli maintained a form of autonomy, by keeping its own Parliament ruling on the old territory of the Patriarchate; it also maintained its feudal nobility, which was able to keep their feudal rights over the land and its inhabitants for some time. Venice exploited the Friulian lands. The harvesting of timber needed to build Venetian ships caused complete deforestation of the lower and central Friuli. Venice took also possession of collective farms belonging to rural Friulian communities, seriously impoverishing them.

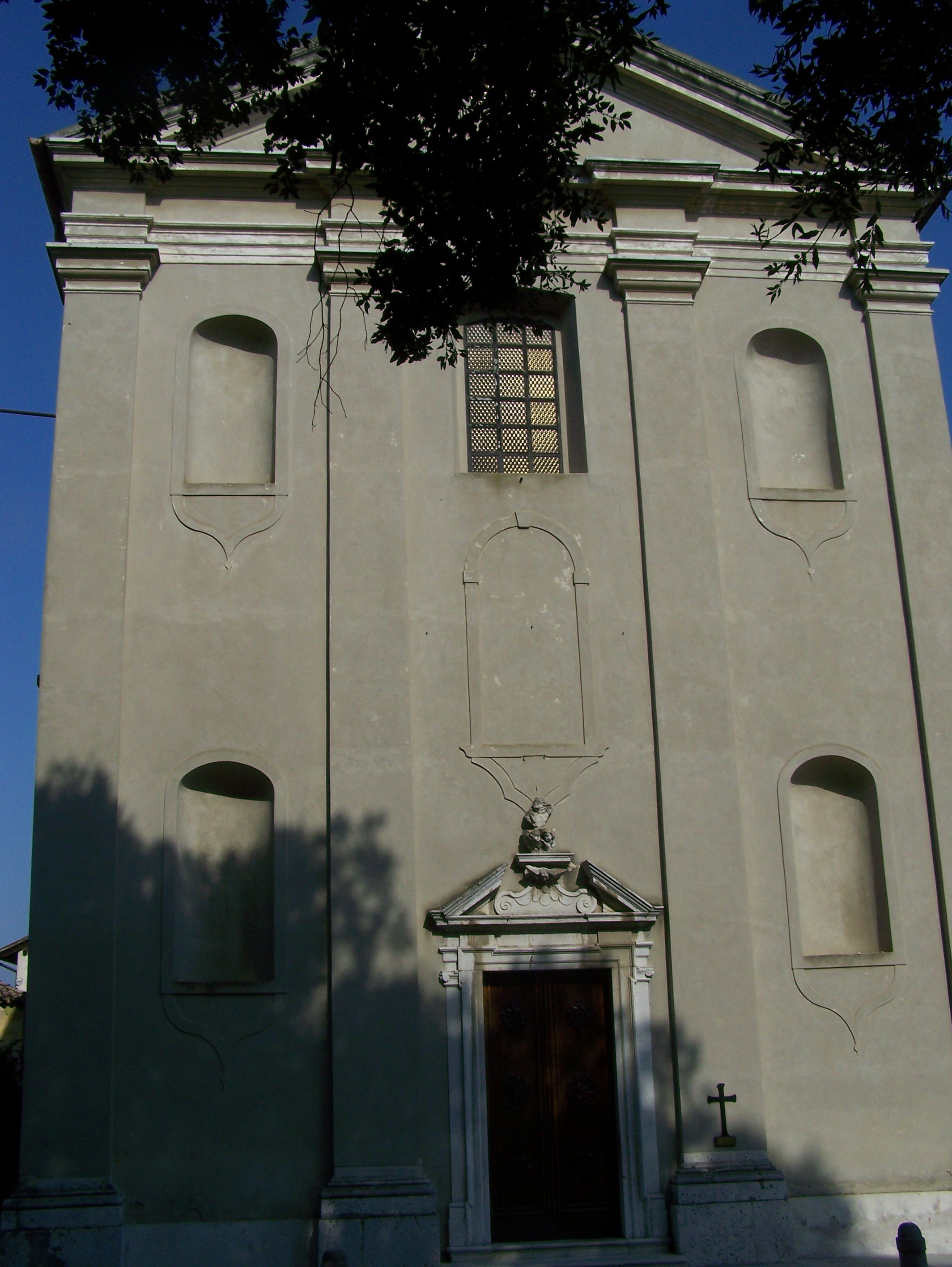
San Giorgio Martire, constructed between 1696 and 1736

Beginning in 1516 the Habsburg Empire controlled eastern Friuli, while western and central Friuli was Venetian. Campolongo and Tapogliano then, wedged between the Austrian archducal territory, often felt the weight of foreign incursions, which Austria then instigated or nurtured, so much so that: "... the twentieth first of May 1616 some (archducal) forces, stopping outside Gradisca, sacked the villa of Campolongo, highly esteemed by the Venetians".

In another circumstance Campolongo was put on fire and according to the chronicle of the town leaders (catapano), the priest was killed, the parsonage burned and grains and livestock were removed from the country.

=== Modern age ===
==== Austrian rule ====
Campolongo remained under Venetian rule until the fall of Venice, that is, from the year 1420 to 1797. That year under the Treaty of Campo Formio, this part of the Friuli became part of Austria. For a brief period from 1805 until the Bourbon Restoration (Congress of Vienna), Friuli belonged to the Italic Kingdom under Napoleon.

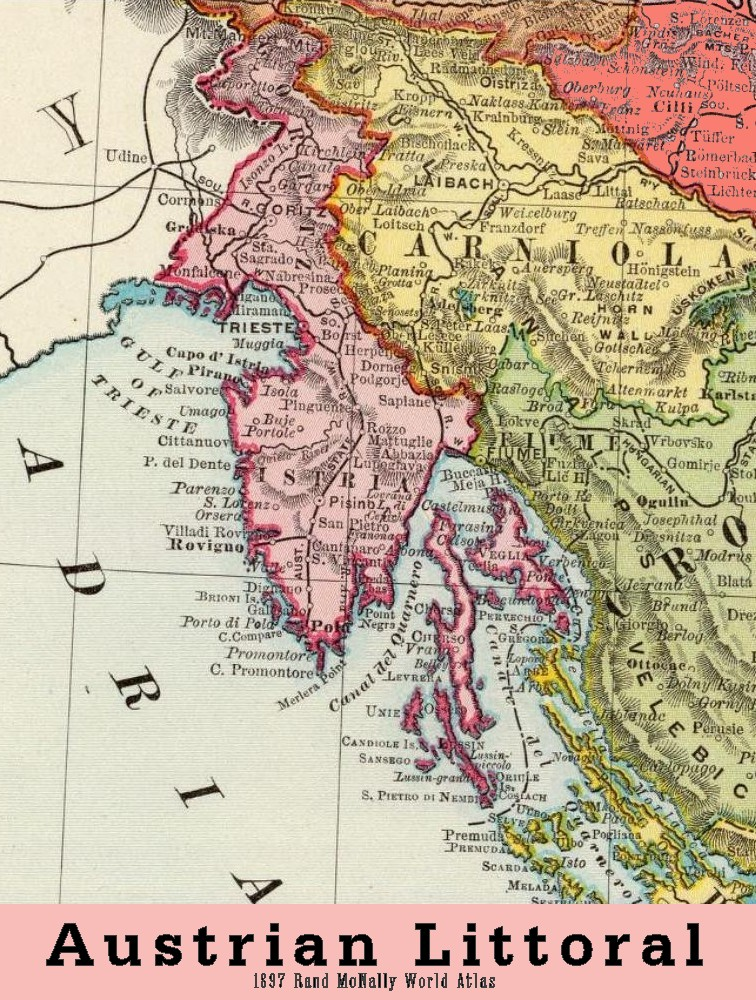
Austrian Küstenland

The Ethnographic map of Karl von Czoernig-Czernhausen, issued by the Imperial Administration of Statistics in 1855, recorded a total of over 400 thousand Friulians living in the Austrian Empire. The majority of Friulians (about 351 thousand) lived in that part of Friuli that belonged to the Kingdom of Lombardy–Venetia, the others in the Friulian parts of the Austrian Küstenland. Friulians were registered as their own category separate from Italians.

Küstenland (or the Austrian Littoral) was officially Triest Province, one of two provinces (or governments) of the Empire, the other being Laibach (Ljubljana in Slovenia). It was further divided into four districts or kreis: 1) Görz or Gorizia including the Julian March (Include Campolongo), 2) Istrien or Istria, Eastern Istria and the Quarnero Islands, 3) Triest or Trieste; the Trieste hinterland and Western Istria, and 4) Trieste city.

Around 1825, the province was reorganized into two subdivisions: 1) Istria and 2) Gorizia (includes Campolongo) with Trieste and its immediate surroundings under the direct control of the crown and separate from the local administrative structure.

In 1849, Küstenland became a separate crown land with a governor in Trieste. It was formally divided into Istria and Gorizia and Gradisca (includes Campolongo) with Trieste remaining separate from both.

By 1861, Gorizia and Gradisca (includes Campolongo) and Istria became administratively separate entities and, in 1867, Trieste received separate status as well, and the Küstenland was divided into the three crown lands of the Imperial Free City of Trieste and its suburbs, the Margraviate of Istria, and the Princely County of Gorizia and Gradisca (includes Campolongo), which each had separate administrations and Landtag assemblies, but were all subject to a statholder at Trieste.

During the Third War of Independence in 1866, Campolongo saw the location of the last action between the Kingdoms of Italy and Austria. On July 26, a mixed Italian force of bersaglieri and cavalry defeated an Austrian force guarding the crossing of the Torre river and reached present-day Romans d'Isonzo in the Battle of Versa. This marked the maximum Italian advance into Friuli. Under the Treaty of Vienna (1866), Central Friuli (today's province of Udine) and western Friuli (today's province of Pordenone) were annexed by Italy together with Veneto after this war, while eastern Friuli (County of Gorizia and Gradisca, including Campolongo) remained under Austria. This division helped in part to give rise to "Italia irredenta".

== Demographic evolution ==
Historical population

Year	Pop.	±%
1861	?	—
1871	?	—
1881	?	—
1901	?	—
1911	?	—

Year	Pop.	±%
1921	1,245	—
1931	1,020	−18.1%
1936	1,039	+1.9%
1951	1,047	+0.8%
1961	939	−10.3%

Year	Pop.	±%
1971	828	−11.8%
1981	793	−4.2%
1991	712	−10.2%
2001	716	+0.6%

Source: Data from ISTAT
