= List of railway stations in Friuli-Venezia Giulia =

This is the list of the railway stations in Friuli-Venezia Giulia owned by:

- Rete Ferroviaria Italiana (RFI), a branch of the Italian state company Ferrovie dello Stato;
- Ferrovie Udine-Cividale (FUC).

== RFI stations ==
Station	Locality	Province	Category
Artegna	Artegna	Udine	Bronze
Aviano	Aviano	Pordenone	Bronze
Basiliano	Basiliano	Udine	Bronze
Bivio d'Aurisina	Duino-Aurisina	Trieste	Bronze
Budoia-Polcenigo	Budoia	Pordenone	Bronze
Buttrio	Buttrio	Udine	Bronze
Capriva	Capriva	Gorizia	Bronze
Carnia	Carnia	Udine	Bronze
Casarsa	Casarsa della Delizia	Pordenone	Silver
Cervignano-Aquileia-Grado	Cervignano del Friuli	Udine	Silver
Codroipo	Codroipo	Udine	Silver
Cordovado Sesto	Cordovado	Pordenone	Bronze
Cormons	Cormons	Gorizia	Silver
Cornino	Cornino	Udine	Bronze
Cusano	Cusano	Pordenone	Bronze
Fanna-Cavasso	Fanna	Pordenone	Bronze
Fontanafredda	Fontanafredda	Pordenone	Bronze
Forgaria-Bagni Anduins	Forgaria nel Friuli	Pordenone	Bronze
Gemona del Friuli	Gemona del Friuli	Udine	Silver
Gorizia Centrale	Gorizia	Gorizia	Silver
Latisana-Lignano-Bibione	latisana	Udine	Silver
Lumignacco	Lumignacco	Udine	Bronze
Maniago	Maniago	Pordenone	Bronze
Manzano	Manzano	Udine	Bronze
Meduno	Meduno	Pordenone	Bronze
Miramare	Trieste	Trieste	Bronze
Monfalcone	Monfalcone	Gorizia	Silver
Montereale Valcellina	Montereale Valcellina	Pordenone	Bronze
Mossa	Mossa	Gorizia	Bronze
Muzzana del Turgnano	Muzzana del Turgnano	Udine	Bronze
Palazzolo dello Stella	Palazzolo dello Stella	Udine	Bronze
Palmanova	Palmanova	Udine	Silver
Pinzano	Pinzano al Tagliamento	Pordenone	Bronze
Pontebba	Pontebba	Udine	Bronze
Pordenone	Pordenone	Pordenone	Gold
Redipuglia	Fogliano Redipuglia	Gorizia	Bronze
Risano	Risano	Udine	Bronze
Ronchi dei Legionari Nord	Ronchi dei Legionari	Gorizia	Bronze
San Giorgio di Nogaro	San Giorgio di Nogaro	Udine	Silver
San Giovanni al Natisone	San Giovanni al Natisone	Udine	Bronze
San Giovanni di Casarsa	San Giovanni	Pordenone	Bronze
Santa Maria La Longa	Santa Maria La Longa	Udine	Bronze
Santo Stefano Udinese	Santo Stefano Udinese	Udine	Bronze
San Vito al Tagliamento	S.Vito al Tagliamento	Pordenone	Silver
Sacile	Sacile	Pordenone	Silver
Sacile-San Liberale	Sacile	Pordenone	Bronze
Sagrado	Sagrado	Gorizia	Silver
Sevegliano	Sevegliano	Udine	Bronze
Sistiana-Visogliano	Sistiana	Trieste	Bronze
Strassoldo	Strassoldo	Udine	Bronze
Tarcento	Tarcento	Udine	Bronze
Tarvisio Boscoverde	Tarvisio	Udine	Silver
Travesio	Travesio	Pordenone	Bronze
Tricesimo-San Pelagio	Tricesimo	Udine	Bronze
Trieste Airport	Ronchi dei Legionari	Gorizia	
Trieste Centrale	Trieste	Trieste	Gold
Udine	Udine	Udine	Gold
Ugovizza-Valbruna	Ugovizza	Udine	Bronze
Venzone	Venzone	Udine	Bronze
Villa Opicina	Villa Opicina	Trieste	Bronze

== FUC stations ==
Station	Locality	Province
Bottenicco Zona Industriale	Moimacco	Udine
Cividale	Cividale del Friuli	Udine
Moimacco	Moimacco	Udine
Remanzacco	Moimacco	Udine
San Gottardo	Udine	Udine

== See also ==
- Railway stations in Italy
- Ferrovie dello Stato
- Rail transport in Italy
- High-speed rail in Italy
- Transport in Italy
