= Pordenone railway station =

Railway station in Pordenone, Italy

Pordenone
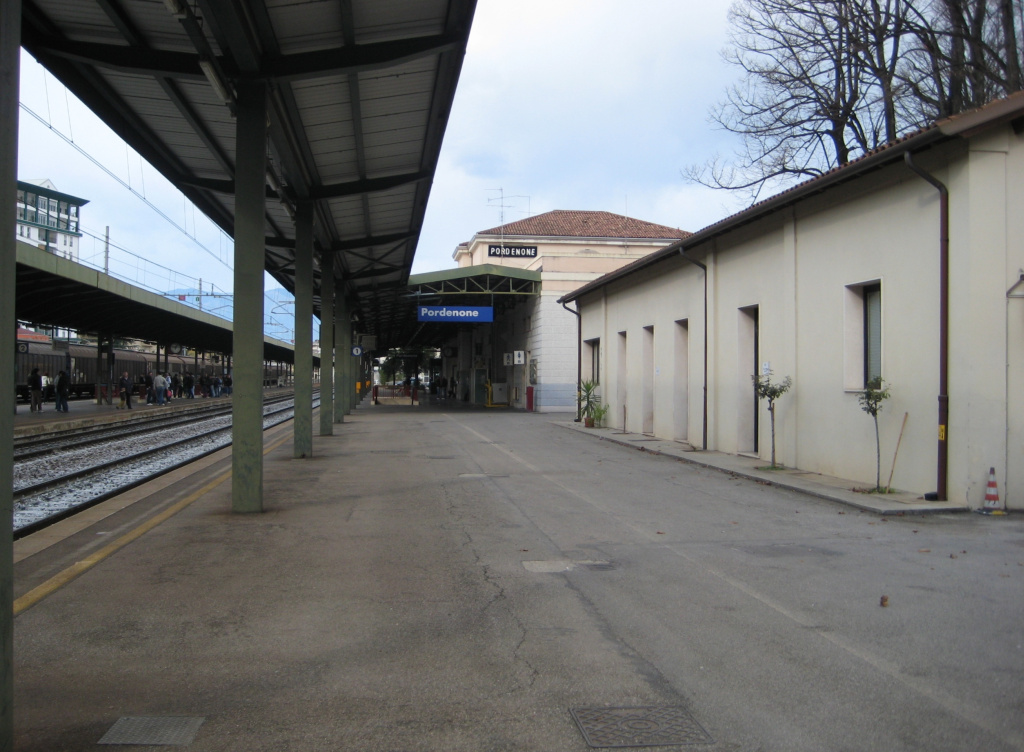
- View of platform 1 looking towards Venice.

General information
- Location: Via Pola 1; 33170 Pordenone PN; Pordenone, Pordenone, Friuli-Venezia Giulia; Italy
- Coordinates: 45°57′24″N 12°39′16″E
- Operator: Rete Ferroviaria Italiana; Centostazioni
- Line: Venice–Udine
- Distance: 77.800 km (48.343 mi) from Venezia Mestre
- Train operators: Trenitalia
- Connections: Urban (ATAP) and suburban buses

Other information
- Classification: Gold

History
- Opened: 1 May 1855; 171 years ago
Location
- Location within Friuli-Venezia Giulia Location within Northern Italy Location within Italy

Pordenone railway station (Italian: Stazione di Pordenone) serves the city and comune of Pordenone, in the autonomous region of Friuli-Venezia Giulia, northeastern Italy. Opened in 1855, the station is located on the Venice–Udine railway. Although it is not a junction or terminal station, it is used by a great many passengers.

The station is currently managed by Rete Ferroviaria Italiana (RFI). However, the commercial area of the passenger building is managed by Centostazioni. Train services to and from the station are operated by Trenitalia. Each of these companies is a subsidiary of Ferrovie dello Stato Italiane (FS), Italy's state-owned rail company.

== Location ==
Pordenone railway station is situated in Via Pola, at the western edge of the city centre.

== History ==
The station became operational on 1 May 1855, when the portion of the Venice–Udine railway between Treviso Centrale and Pordenone was opened. In the same year, the next portion of line, to Casarsa, was completed. Only in 1860 did the line reach its final destination, Udine.

== Features ==
The station is equipped with a large passenger building that houses many services, including ticketing, a kiosk, a bar, a bank, and a Club Eurostar.

== Train services ==
The station is served by the following service(s):

- High speed services (Frecciarossa) Udine - Treviso - Venice - Padua - Bologna - Florence - Rome
- High speed services (Frecciarossa) Udine - Treviso - Venice - Padua - Verona - Milan
- High speed services (Railjet) Vienna - Klagenfurt - Villach - Udine - Treviso - Venice
- Night train (Nighjet) Munich - Tarvisio - Udine - Treviso - Venice
- Night train (EuroNight) Vienna - Linz - Salzburg - Villach - Udine - Treviso - Venice
- Night train (Intercity Notte) Trieste - Udine - Venice - Padua - Bologna - Rome
- Express services (Regionale Veloce) Trieste - Gorizia - Udine - Treviso - Venice
- Regional services (Treno regionale) Trieste - Gorizia - Udine - Treviso - Venice

== Passenger and train movements ==
The movement of passengers at the station is about 3,000,000 people per year, which means that Pordenone is the third busiest station in Friuli-Venezia Giulia in terms of numbers of passengers, after Udine and Trieste Centrale. Passenger traffic is heavy at all hours of the day.

The station is a transit stop for all types of trains. The destinations of the regional trains are: Udine, Venezia Santa Lucia, Sacile, Trieste Centrale and Casarsa. The station is also served by Frecciargento and night trains to Rome and Frecciabianca trains to Milan. International trains operate to Vienna and Munich.

Interchange with the bus is excellent: in the square outside the station are stops for urban and suburban buses. In front of the station there is a taxi stand.

== See also ==
- History of rail transport in Italy
- List of railway stations in Friuli-Venezia Giulia
- Rail transport in Italy
- Railway stations in Italy
