= Codroipo railway station =

Railway station in Friuli-Venezia Giulia, Italy

Codroipo

General information
- Location: Piazzale Oberdan, Codroipo, Friuli-Venezia Giulia; Italy
- Coordinates: 45°57′56″N 12°58′35″E
- System: Railway Station
- Owner: Rete Ferroviaria Italiana
- Operator: Trenitalia
- Line: Venice–Udine railway
- Distance: 103.674 km (64.420 mi) from Venezia Mestre
- Platforms: 2
- Tracks: 2

Other information
- Classification: Silver

History
- Opened: 21 July 1860; 166 years ago
Location
- Location within Friuli-Venezia Giulia Location within Northern Italy Location within Italy

Codroipo (Italian: Stazione di Codroipo) is a railway station serving the town of Codroipo, in the region of Friuli-Venezia Giulia, northern Italy. The station opened on 21 July 1860 and is located on the Venice–Udine railway. The train services are operated by Trenitalia.

== Train services ==
The station is served by the following service(s):

- Night train (Intercity Notte) Trieste - Udine - Venice - Padua - Bologna - Rome
- Express services (Regionale Veloce) Trieste - Gorizia - Udine - Treviso - Venice
- Regional services (Treno regionale) Trieste - Gorizia - Udine - Treviso - Venice

== See also ==
- History of rail transport in Italy
- List of railway stations in Friuli-Venezia Giulia
- Rail transport in Italy
- Railway stations in Italy
