= Latisana–Lignano–Bibione railway station =

Railway station in Italy

Latisana–Lignano–Bibione
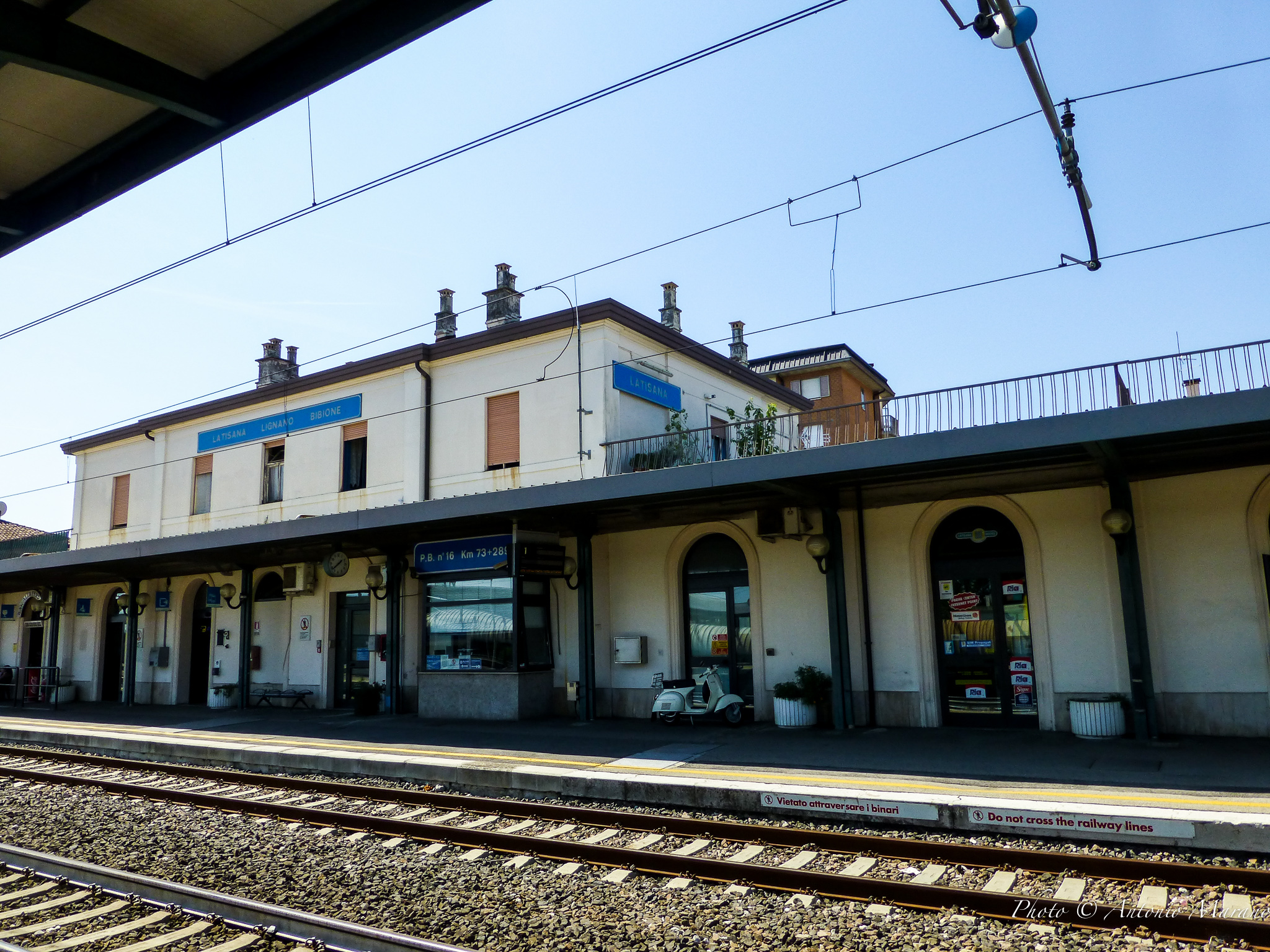
- Latisana–Lignano–Bibione railway station

General information
- Location: Viale Stazione 132, Latisana, Friuli-Venezia Giulia; Italy
- Coordinates: 45°46′41″N 13°00′04″E
- Owner: Rete Ferroviaria Italiana
- Operator: Trenitalia
- Line: Venice–Trieste railway
- Distance: 73.289 km (45.540 mi) from Venezia Mestre
- Platforms: 4
- Tracks: 4

Other information
- Classification: Silver
Location
- Location within Friuli-Venezia Giulia Location within Northern Italy Location within Italy

Latisana–Lignano–Bibione (Italian: Stazione di Latisana–Lignano–Bibione) is a railway station serving the town of Latisana and the seaside resorts of Lignano and Bibione, in the region of Friuli-Venezia Giulia, northern Italy. The station is located on the Venice–Trieste railway. The train services are operated by Trenitalia.

The station opened simply as Latisana but in 1939 became Latisana–Lignano and in 1962 the station became known as Latisana–Lignano–Bibione.

== Train services ==
The station is served by the following service(s):

- High speed services (Frecciargento) Rome – Florence – Bologna – Padua – Venice – Trieste
- High speed services (Frecciarossa) Turin – Milan – Verona – Padua – Venice – Trieste
- Intercity services Rome – Florence – Bologna – Padua – Venice – Trieste
- Express services (Regionale Veloce) Venice – Portogruaro – Cervignano del Friuli – Trieste
- Express services (Regionale veloce) Verona – Padua – Venice – Latisana

== Bus services ==
Buses operate to the former stations of Palazzolo dello Stella and Muzzana del Turgnano.

== See also ==
- History of rail transport in Italy
- List of railway stations in Friuli-Venezia Giulia
- Rail transport in Italy
- Railway stations in Italy
