= San Giorgio di Nogaro railway station =

Railway station in Italy

San Giorgio di Nogaro
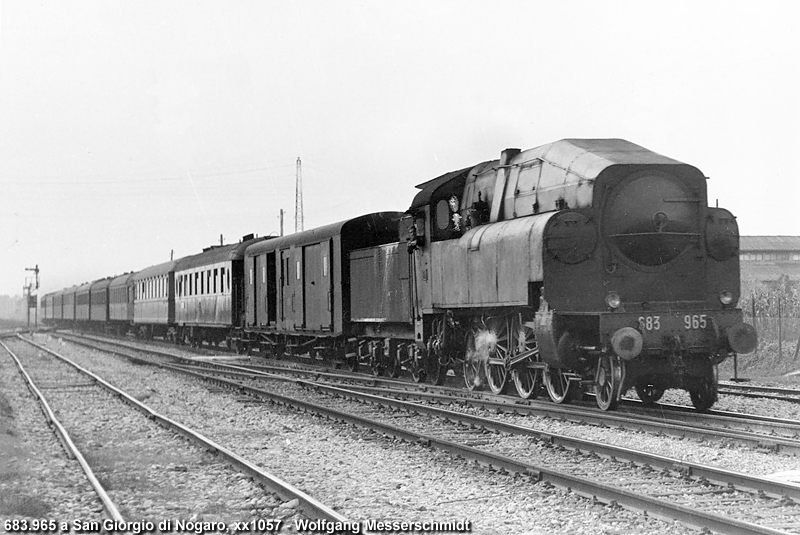
- San Giorgio di Nogaro railway station

General information
- Location: Viale Stazione 132, San Giorgio di Nogaro, Friuli-Venezia Giulia; Italy
- Coordinates: 45°49′45″N 13°12′36″E
- Owner: Rete Ferroviaria Italiana
- Operator: Trenitalia
- Line: Venice–Trieste railway
- Distance: 90.962 km (56.521 mi) from Venezia Mestre
- Platforms: 3
- Tracks: 8

Other information
- Classification: Silver

History
- Opened: 26 August 1888; 137 years ago
Location
- Location within Friuli-Venezia Giulia Location within Northern Italy Location within Italy

San Giorgio di Nogaro (Italian: Stazione di San Giorgio di Nogaro) is a railway station serving the town of San Giorgio di Nogaro, in the region of Friuli-Venezia Giulia, northern Italy. The station is located on the Venice–Trieste railway. The train services are operated by Trenitalia.

== History ==
The station opened on 26 August 1888 on the Palmanova-San Giorgio di Nogaro railway. On 31 December 1888 the line was extended to Portogruaro. On 18 October 1897 the line was extended eastwards, to Cervignano, which was the final section of the Venice-Trieste railway which was missing. The line to Palmanova was closed in 1997, where a bus now operates in its place.

== Train services ==
The station is served by the following service(s):

- Express services (Regionale Veloce) Venice - Portogruaro - Cervignano del Friuli - Trieste

== See also ==
- History of rail transport in Italy
- List of railway stations in Friuli-Venezia Giulia
- Rail transport in Italy
- Railway stations in Italy
