= Ciol =

Ciol or CIOL may refer to:

- Chartered Institute of Linguists (CIOL)
- Elio Ciol (born 1929), Italian photographer and publisher
- Marcia Ciol, Brazilian-American statistician
- Rita Ciol (or Sior), main character of anime series Sisters of Wellber
