= Cervignano–Aquileia–Grado railway station =

Railway station in Italy

Cervignano–Aquileia–Grado
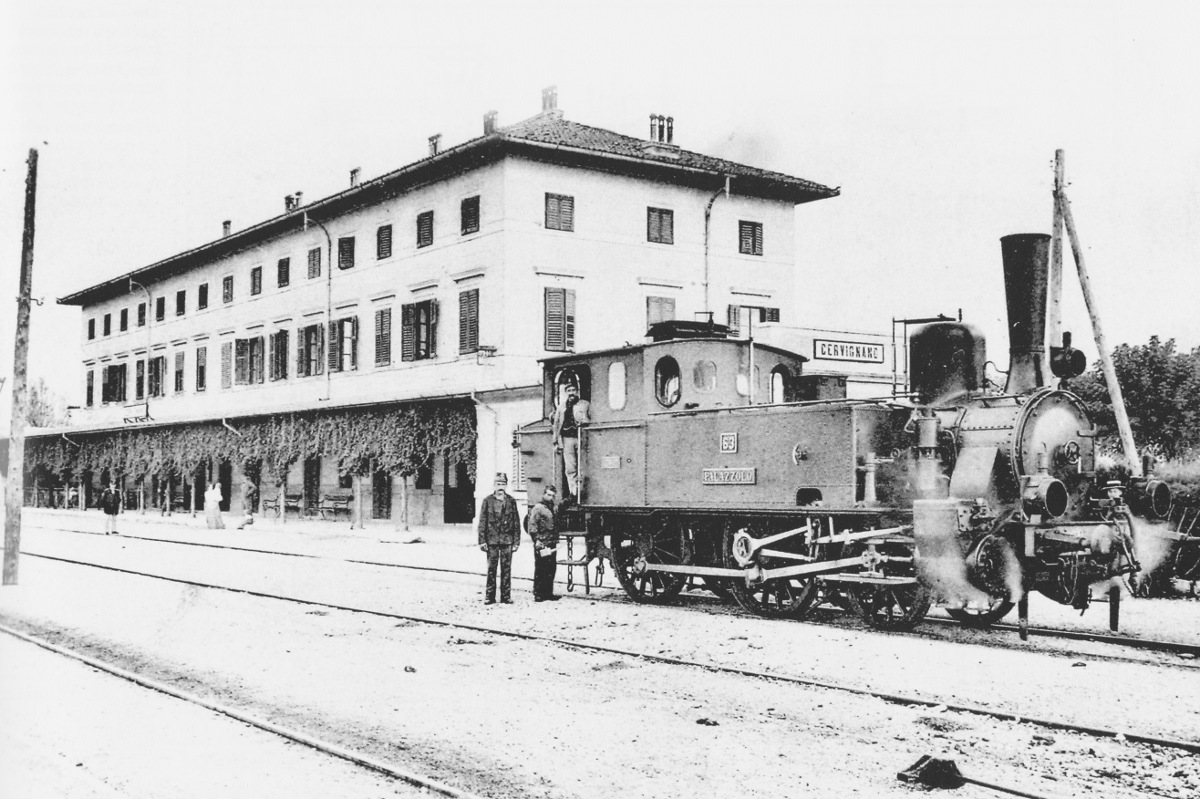

General information
- Location: Viale Stazione 33, Cervignano del Friuli, Friuli-Venezia Giulia; Italy
- Coordinates: 45°49′27″N 13°20′37″E
- Owner: Rete Ferroviaria Italiana
- Operator: Trenitalia
- Lines: Venice–Trieste railway Udine–Cervignano railway
- Distance: 101.338 km (62.969 mi) from Venezia Mestre
- Platforms: 4
- Tracks: 8

Other information
- Classification: Silver

History
- Opened: 11 June 1894; 132 years ago
Location
- Location within Friuli-Venezia Giulia Location within Northern Italy Location within Italy

Cervignano–Aquileia–Grado (Italian: Stazione di Cervignano–Aquileia–Grado) is a railway station serving the town of Cervignano del Friuli, in the region of Friuli-Venezia Giulia, northern Italy. The station opened on 11 June 1894 and is located on the Venice–Trieste railway and Udine–Cervignano railway. The train services are operated by Trenitalia.

== History ==
Between 1910 and 1937, the station was the terminus of the Cervignano-Aquileia-Pontile per Grado railway. In 1937 with the termination of the service on the short line to Grado, the station assumed its present name, Cervignano-Aquileia-Grado, which refers to two major tourist areas. The station was known as Cervignano del Friuli until 1937.

== Train services ==
The station is served by the following service(s):

- High speed services (Frecciarossa) Turin - Milan - Verona - Padua - Venice - Trieste
- Intercity services Rome - Florence - Bologna - Padua - Venice - Trieste
- Express services (Regionale Veloce) Venice - Portogruaro - Cervignano del Friuli - Trieste
- Regional services (Treno regionale) Tarvisio - Carnia - Gemona del Friuli - Udine - Cervignano del Friuli - Trieste

== Bus services ==
Buses supplement train services between Cervignano, Palmanova and Udine.

== See also ==
- History of rail transport in Italy
- List of railway stations in Friuli-Venezia Giulia
- Rail transport in Italy
- Railway stations in Italy
