= Trieste Airport railway station =

Railway station in Italy

Trieste Airport Ronchi dei Legionari
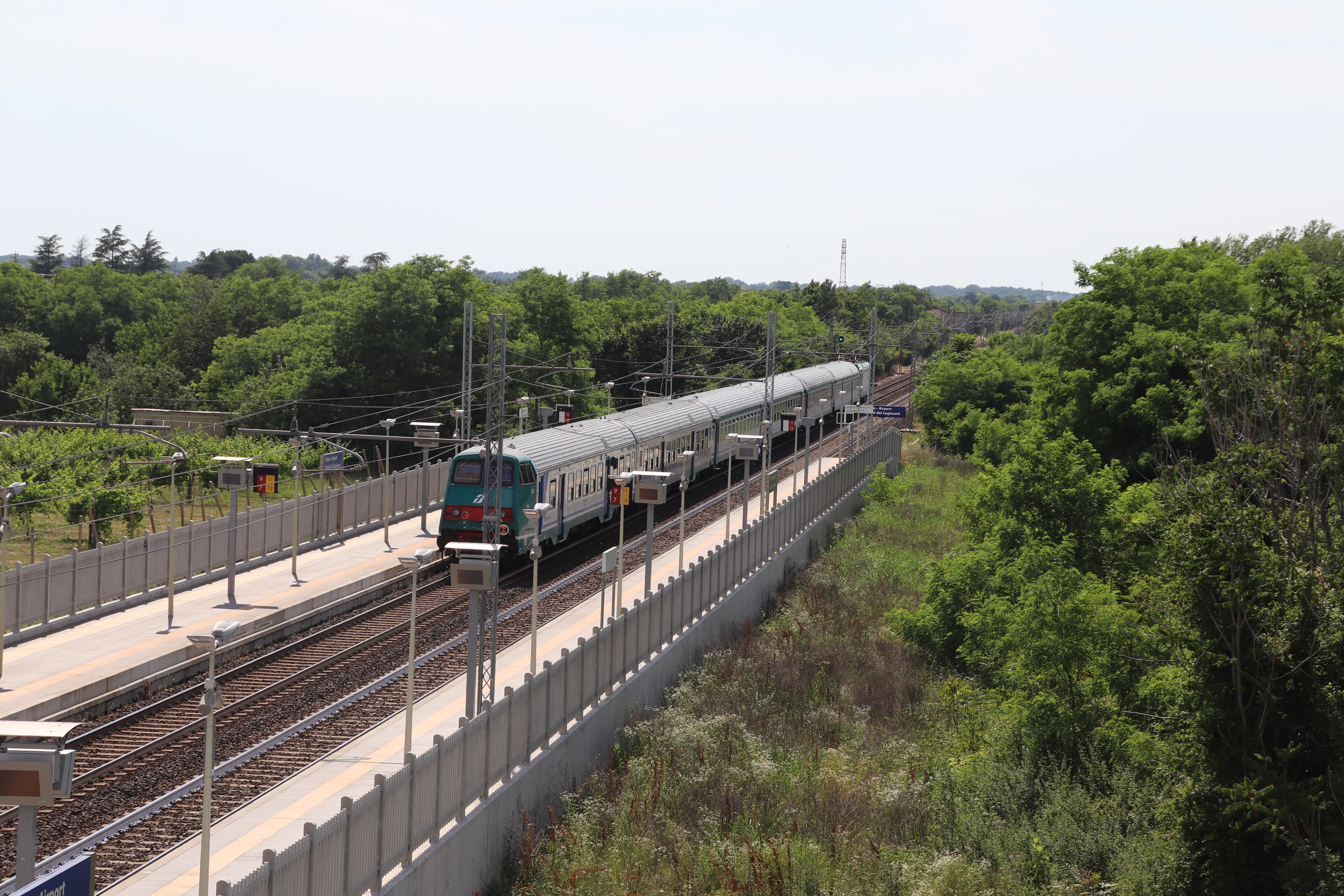

General information
- Location: Ronchi dei Legionari, Friuli-Venezia Giulia; Italy
- Coordinates: 45°49′02″N 13°29′09″E
- System: Railway Station
- Owner: Rete Ferroviaria Italiana
- Operator: Trenitalia
- Line: Venice–Trieste railway
- Distance: 112.820 km (70.103 mi) from Venezia Mestre
- Platforms: 2
- Tracks: 2

Construction
- Parking: Airport parking

Other information
- Website: At Trieste Airport trains

History
- Opened: 19 March 2018; 8 years ago
Location
- Location within Friuli-Venezia Giulia Location within Northern Italy Location within Italy

Trieste Airport (Italian: Stazione di Trieste Airport) is a railway station serving Trieste Airport, located in Ronchi dei Legionari, in the region of Friuli-Venezia Giulia, northern Italy. The station opened on 19 March 2018 and is located on the Venice–Trieste railway. The train services are operated by Trenitalia.

== History ==
Construction work began in January 2017. It cost a total of €17.2 million, €14.2 million of which was publicly funded and €3 million from public-private partnerships.

It opened to public service on March 19, 2018. At the inaugural ceremony, some signs reported the previous provisional name of Trieste-Airport Ronchi dei Legionari.

== Facilities and Systems ==
The station has two through platforms, both served by 400 m long platforms 55 cm high above the track level.

The facility is part of the intermodal hub of the same name, connected to Trieste–Ronchi dei Legionari Airport. It includes:

a bus station with sixteen bus bays a ground-level parking lot with 1,000 spaces a multi-story parking lot with another 500 spaces. The station is connected to the airport via a 425 m long walkway, which crosses the Venezia Giulia state road 14. It is one of the "barrier-free stations," meaning those equipped to allow access for people with disabilities or reduced mobility.

== Train services ==
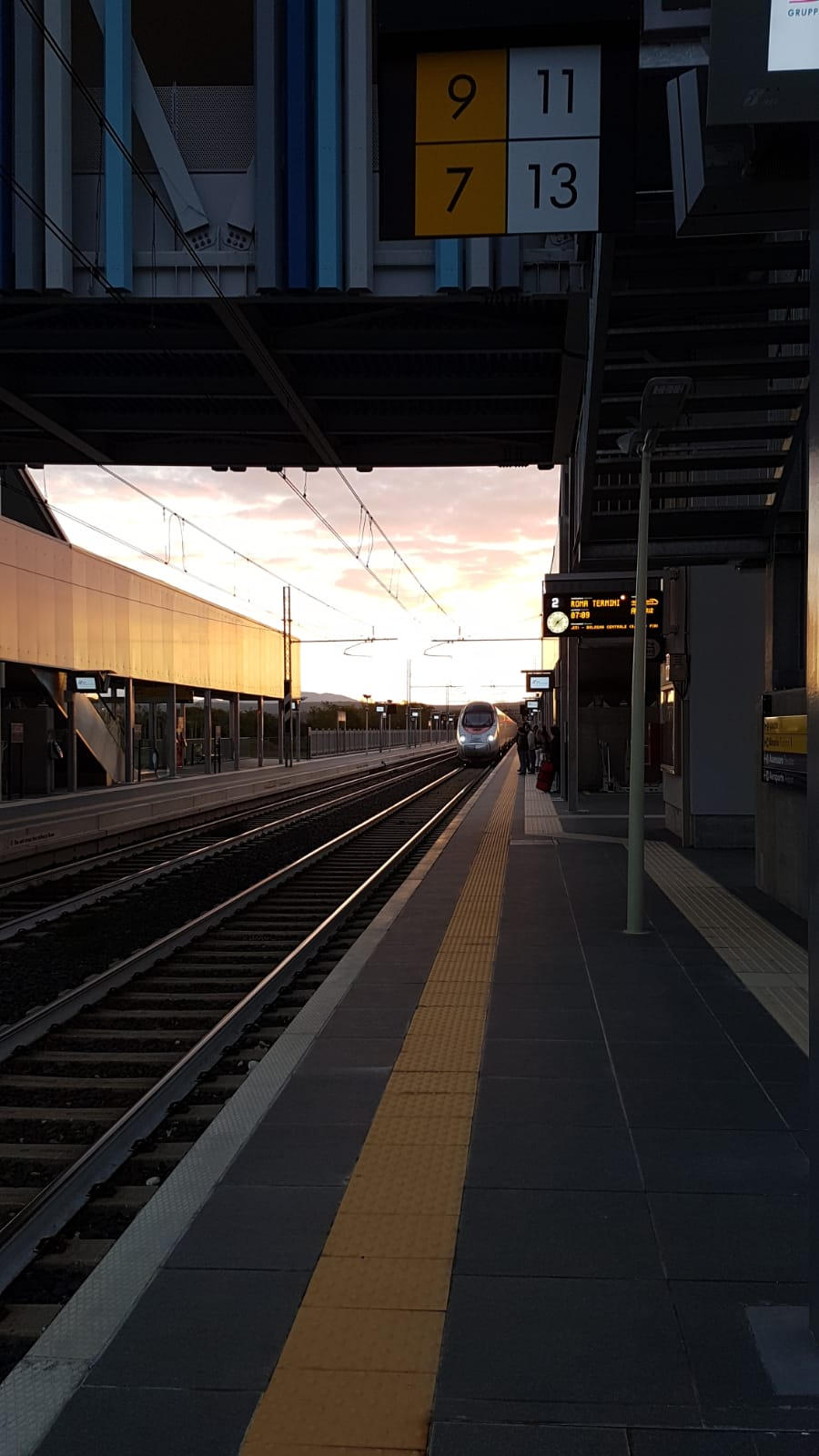
Trieste Airport train station

The station is served by the following service(s):

- High speed services (Frecciarossa) Naples - Rome - Florence - Bologna - Padua - Venice - Trieste
- High speed services (Frecciarossa) Turin - Milan - Verona - Padua - Venice - Trieste
- Intercity services Rome - Florence - Bologna - Padua - Venice - Trieste
- Express services (Regionale Veloce) Venice - Portogruaro - Cervignano del Friuli - Trieste
- Regional services (Treno regionale) Tarvisio - Carnia - Gemona del Friuli - Udine - Cervignano del Friuli - Trieste
- International Regional services (Treno regionale) Venezia Mestre - Gorizia - Nova Gorica

== Bibliography ==
- Claudio Canton, with the collaboration of Daniele De Anna (March 2018). "La fermata di Trieste Airport". Il Tender. No. 88. pp. 1–2.

== See also ==
- History of rail transport in Italy
- List of railway stations in Friuli-Venezia Giulia
- Rail transport in Italy
- Railway stations in Italy
