= Gemona del Friuli railway station =

Railway station in Italy

Gemona del Friuli

General information
- Location: Piazzale della Stazione 2, Gemona del Friuli, Friuli-Venezia Giulia; Italy
- Coordinates: 46°16′26″N 13°07′41″E
- System: Railway Station
- Owner: Rete Ferroviaria Italiana
- Operator: Trenitalia; ÖBB
- Lines: Tarvisio–Udine railway Gemona del Friuli-Casarsa railway
- Distance: 28.199 km (17.522 mi) from Udine
- Platforms: 4
- Tracks: 4

Other information
- Classification: Silver

History
- Opened: 15 October 1875; 150 years ago
Location
- Location within Friuli-Venezia Giulia Location within Northern Italy Location within Italy

Gemona del Friuli (Italian: Stazione di Gemona del Friuli) is a railway station serving the town of Gemona del Friuli, in the region of Friuli-Venezia Giulia, northern Italy. The station opened on 15 November 1875 and is located on the Pontebbana railway (Udine–Tarvisio) and Gemona del Friuli-Casarsa railway. The train services are operated by Trenitalia and ÖBB.

== History ==
The station was inaugurated on 15 November 1875 when the railway line from Udine opened.

On 18 December 1876 the line was extended to the station of Carnia. It took until 1 November 1914 for Gemona to be connected with Pinzano, completing the railway line from Casarsa.

In 1992 the doubling of the line from Artegna was completed, which involved the reconstruction of the station and the adjacent service yard.

== Train services ==
The station is served by the following service(s):

- Regional services (REX) Villach - Tarvisio - Carnia - Gemona del Friuli - Udine
- Regional services (Treno regionale) Tarvisio - Carnia - Gemona del Friuli - Udine - Cervignano del Friuli - Trieste

== Bus services ==
- Tarvisio - Carnia - Gemona del Friuli - Udine
- Maniago - Pinzano - Germona del Friuli

== See also ==
- History of rail transport in Italy
- List of railway stations in Friuli-Venezia Giulia
- Rail transport in Italy
- Railway stations in Italy
