= Gioacchino Muccin =

Italian Roman Catholic clergyman

- Church: Roman Catholic
- See: Diocese of Belluno-Feltre
- In office: 1949–1975

Personal details
- Born: 25 November 1899 Casarsa della Delizia, Province of Pordenone, Friuli-Venezia Giulia, Italy
- Died: 27 August 1991 (aged 91)

Gioacchino Muccin (25 November 1899 – 27 August 1991) was an Italian Roman Catholic clergyman who became the bishop of the Diocese of Belluno-Feltre. He was born in Casarsa della Delizia, Pordenone, a province in the region of Friuli-Venezia Giulia, Italy. From 1949 to 1975, Muccin served as the bishop of the Diocese of Belluno-Feltre. He died at age 91.

== See also ==
- Lists of patriarchs, archbishops, and bishops
- List of Italians
