= Zefferino Tomè =

Italian lawyer, partisan, and politician

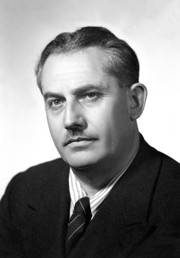
Portrait of Zefferino Tomè

Zefferino Tomè (1905, in Casarsa della Delizia – 1979) was an Italian lawyer, partisan (during the Second World War) and politician. He was a Christian Democratic senator from 1948 to 1958. He was a friend of Pier Paolo Pasolini.
