= Ausa (Udine) =

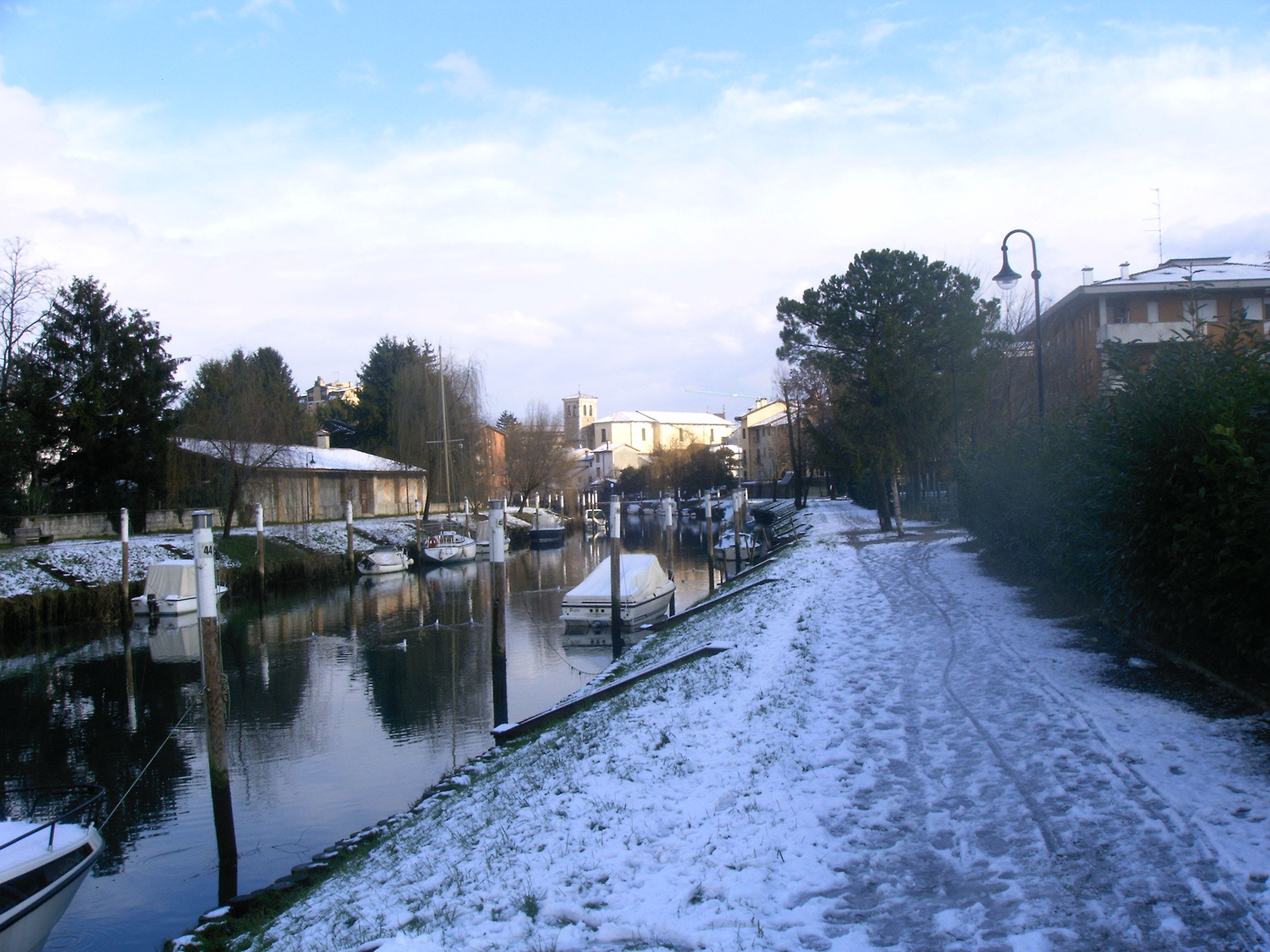
- The Ausa flowing past Cervignano

Location
- Country: Italy

Physical characteristics
- Source
  - location: Novacco
- Mouth
  - location: Laguna di Marano
  - coordinates: 45°45′10″N 13°14′24″E

The Ausa or Aussa (Latin: Alsa) is a river in the Italian province of Udine. Its source is near the city of Udine. The river flows south past Palmanova, Aiello del Friuli, Cervignano del Friuli and Terzo d'Aquileia before emptying into the Laguna di Marano between Marano Lagunare and Aquileia.
