= Casarsa della Delizia =

Casarsa della Delizia Cjasarsa (Friulian)
- Comune
- Città di Casarsa della Delizia
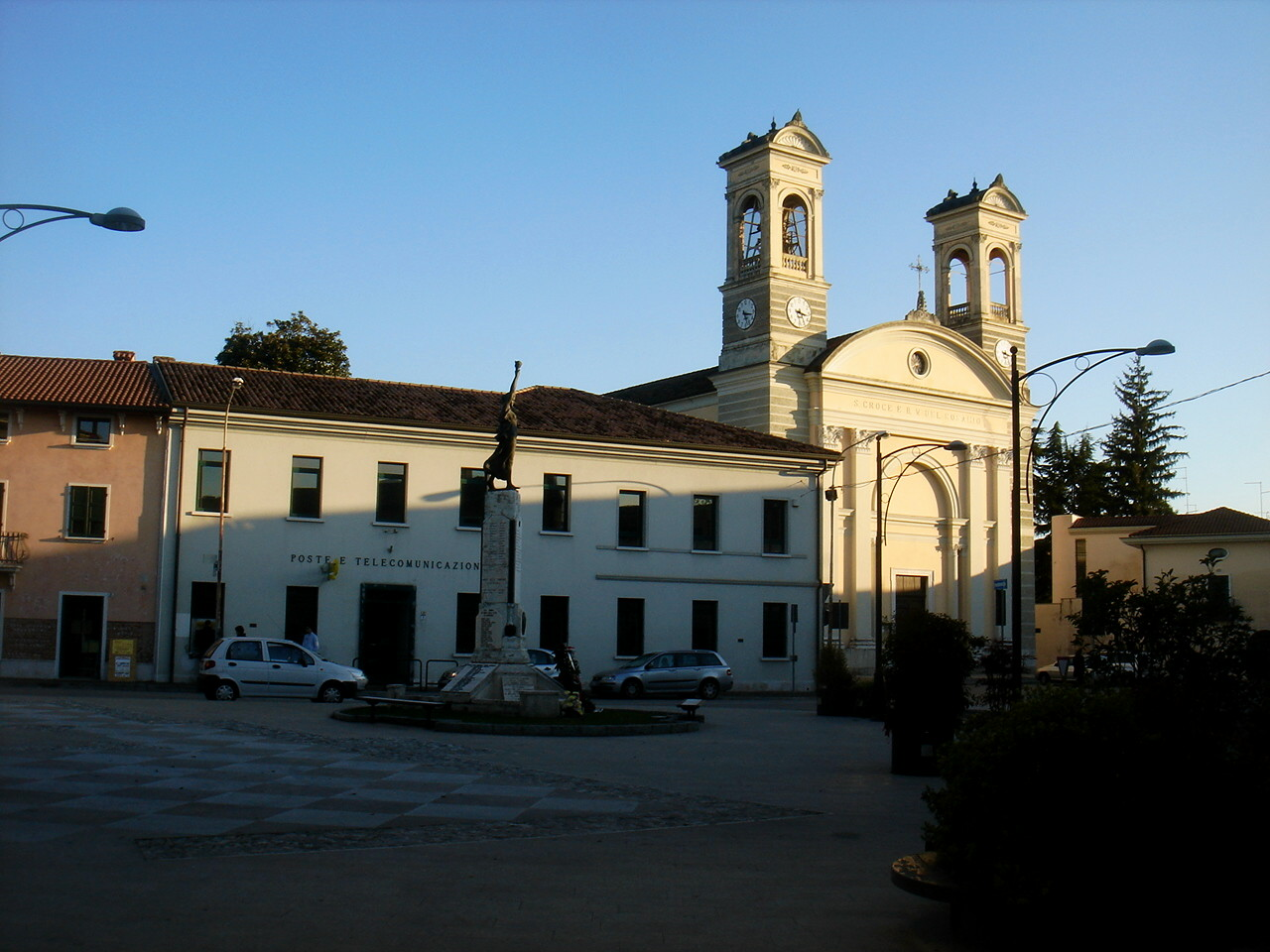

- Location within Italy Location within Friuli-Venezia Giulia
- Coordinates: 45°57′N 12°51′E
- Country: Italy
- Region: Friuli-Venezia Giulia
- Province: Pordenone (PN)

Government
  - Mayor: Lavinia Clarotto

Area
  - Total: 20.4 km^{2} (7.9 sq mi)
- Elevation: 44 m (144 ft)

Population (28 February 2011)
  - Total: 8,599
  - Density: 422/km^{2} (1,090/sq mi)
- Demonym: Casarsesi
- Time zone: UTC+1 (CET)
  - Summer (DST): UTC+2 (CEST)
- Postal code: 33072
- Dialing code: 0434
- Website: Official website

Casarsa della Delizia or simply Casarsa (Standard Friulian: Cjasarse, Western Friulian: Cjasarsa) is a comune (municipality) in the Regional decentralization entity of Pordenone in the Italian region of Friuli-Venezia Giulia, located about 80 kilometres (50 mi) northwest of Trieste and about 15 kilometres (9 mi) east of Pordenone.

Casarsa della Delizia borders the following municipalities: Arzene, Fiume Veneto, San Vito al Tagliamento, Valvasone, Zoppola.

It houses the tomb of local poet and writer Pier Paolo Pasolini, as well as a Didactic Center based in his mother's house.

== People ==
- Elio Ciol
- Bryan Cristante
- The Jacuzzi brothers
- Gioacchino Muccin
- Nico Naldini
- Pier Paolo Pasolini
- Zefferino Tomè
- Ezio Vendrame

== Transport ==
Casarsa railway station is on the busy Venice–Udine railway. Train services operate to Venice, Treviso, Udine, Trieste, Portogruaro, Padua, Bologna and Rome.
