= Palazzo Ricchieri, Pordenone =

The Palazzo Ricchieri is a palace in central Pordenone, located on Corso Vittorio Emanuele II number 51, across from the Palazzo della Comune of the city. It now serves as the Museo Civico d'Arte di Pordenone.

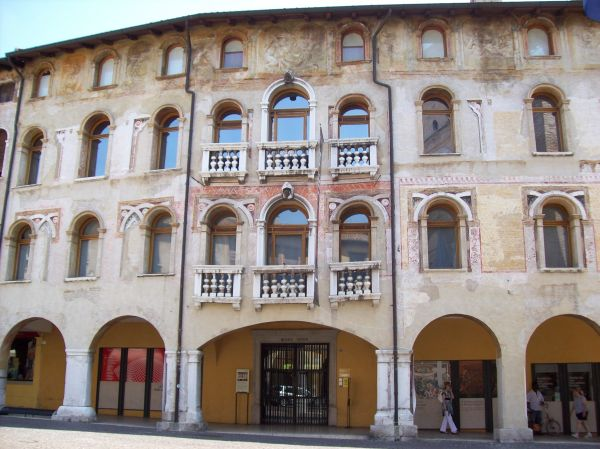
Palace Facade.

The structure originated as a 13th-century fortress tower, belonging to the Ricchieri family, who served at times, either the Holy Roman Emperor or the Republic of Venice. In 1468, the head of the family was made Count by the Holy Roman Emperor.

By the 15th century, the main layout was developed consisting of three blocks with a frescoed facades, and lower porticos marked by arches. The large central arch is surmounted by three narrow balconied windows. Further reconstructions occurred in later centuries; the gothic style windows on the first floor appear to have been added around 1667.

The piano nobile or main salon is a hall frescoed with the Story of Tristan and Isolde from the early 14th century. Also a series of small painted wooden tablets depict scenes from the age: including romances, duels, hunts, and a bestiary with unicorns, dragons, and flying serpents.

Major portions of the palace were donated in the 1950s by the Ricchieri family to the Comune for the civic museum. The museum displays a large collection of sacred painting, sculpture, and objects from the region.
