= Conegliano railway station =

Railway station in Veneto, Italy

Conegliano
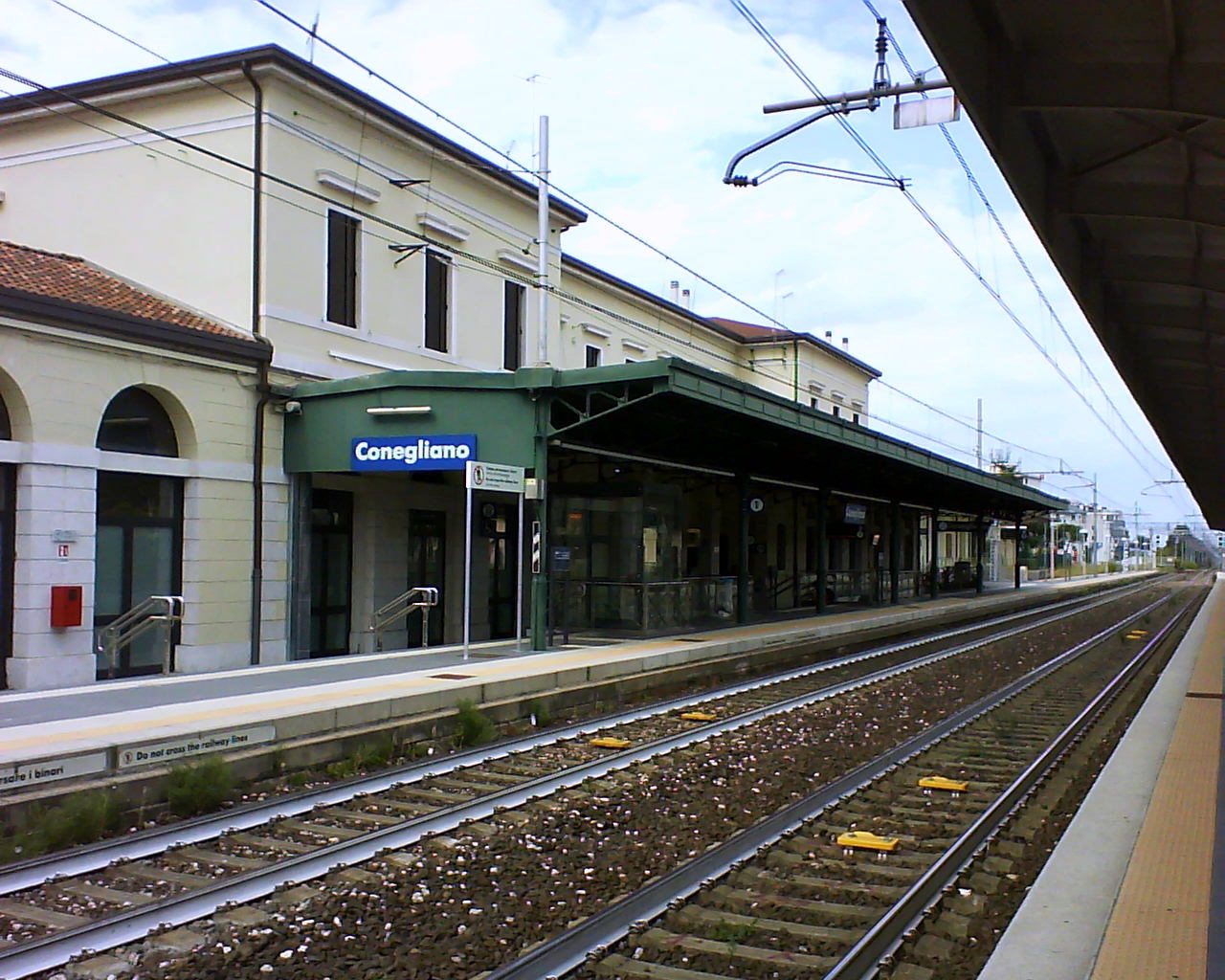
- Conegliano railway station

General information
- Location: Via Carducci 45, Conegliano, Veneto; Italy
- Coordinates: 45°53′05″N 12°17′55″E
- Owner: Rete Ferroviaria Italiana
- Operator: Trenitalia
- Lines: Venice–Udine railway Ponte nelle Alpi-Conegliano railway
- Distance: 47.861 km (29.739 mi) from Venezia Mestre
- Platforms: 3
- Tracks: 5

Other information
- Classification: Silver

History
- Opened: 1 May 1855; 171 years ago
Location
- Location within Veneto Location within Northern Italy Location within Italy

Conegliano (Italian: Stazione di Conegliano) is a railway station serving the town of Conegliano, in the region of Veneto, northern Italy. The station opened on 1 May 1855 and is located on the Venice–Udine railway and Ponte nelle Alpi-Conegliano railway. The train services are operated by Trenitalia.

== Features ==
The station is equipped, internally, with ticketing service, automatic ticketing, waiting room, bar, newsstand, toilet and snacks area. The railway traffic is managed with an ACC (Central Computerized Apparatus), remotely controlled by the DCO of VE_Mestre. In addition to the passing tracks, it has a trunk called "Binario 1 giardino", activated to serve the line to Belluno. However, from the activation of electrification on this last section, this track is not used as it is not equipped with an overhead power line.

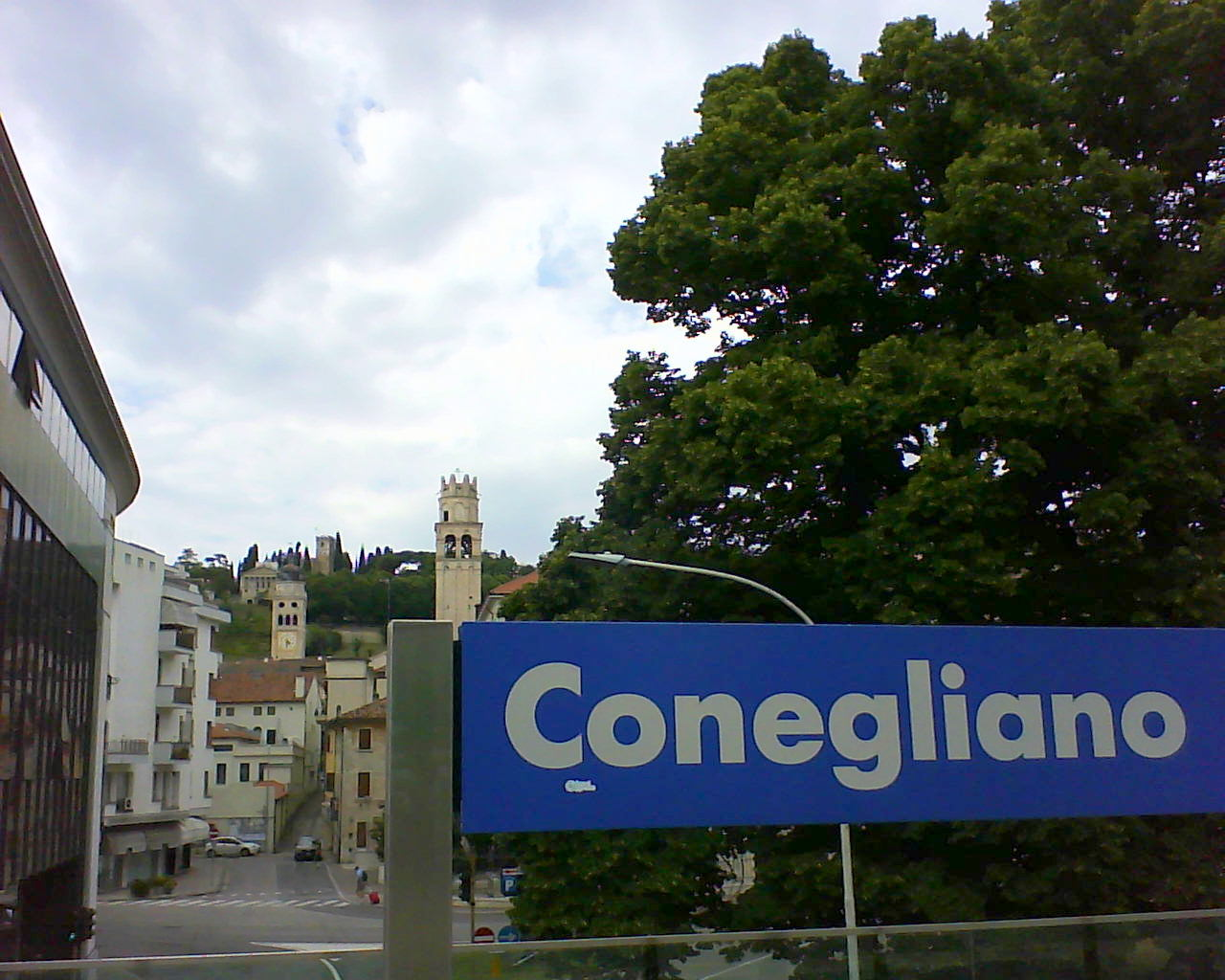

== Train services ==
The station is served by the following service(s):

- High speed services (Frecciarossa) Udine - Treviso - Venice - Padua - Bologna - Florence - Rome
- High speed services (Frecciarossa) Udine - Treviso - Venice - Padua - Verona - Milan
- Night train (CityNightLine) Munich - Tarvisio - Udine - Treviso - Venice
- Night train (EuroNight) Vienna - Linz - Salzburg - Villach - Udine - Treviso - Venice
- Night train (Intercity Notte) Trieste - Udine - Venice - Padua - Bologna - Rome
- Express services (Regionale Veloce) Trieste - Gorizia - Udine - Treviso - Venice
- Regional services (Treno regionale) Trieste - Gorizia - Udine - Treviso - Venice
- Local services (Treno regionale) Belluno - Vittorio Veneto - Conegliano - Treviso - Venice

Since October 2019 it has also been served by a pair of Italo AV trains operating between Udine - Rome.

== See also ==
- History of rail transport in Italy
- List of railway stations in Veneto
- Rail transport in Italy
- Railway stations in Italy
