= Giovanni Maria Zaffoni =

Italian painter

Giovanni Maria Zaffoni (c. 1500 – after 1570) was an Italian painter of the Renaissance period, active in Northern Italy near his natal city of Pordenone.

He is also known as Giovanni Maria Calderari or as il Calderari. He first trained with Giovanni Antonio de' Sacchis, known as il Pordenone and later with Pomponio Amalteo.

He painted the frescoes on Scenes of the life of Christ and the Virgin for the Mantica chapel (1554-1555) in the Duomo of San Marco in Pordenone. He also painted frescoes in the church of Santissima Trinità in Pordenone, as well as in Montereale Valcellina, where he painted a series of frescoes on the Life of the Virgin (1560–63) in the apse of the church of San Rocco. Additional frescoes attributed to Zaffoni are present in Azzano Decimo, and a Nativity, various Saints, and Patron in armor (1542) for the Church of Pescincanna in Friuli.
