= Pordenone =

Pordenone Pordenon (Venetian, Friulian)
- Comune
- Comune di Pordenone
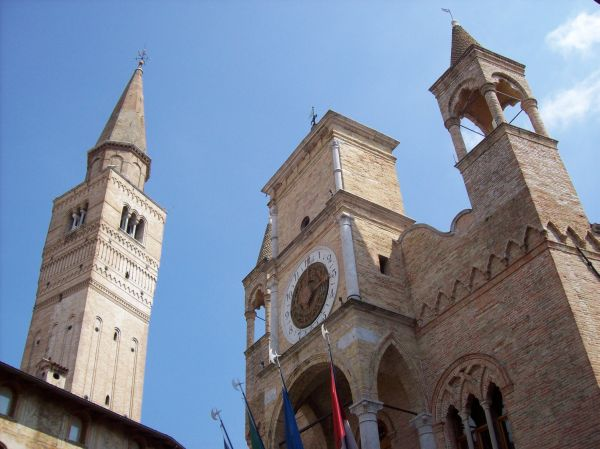
- Pordenone City Hall and bell tower

- Flag Coat of arms

- Location within Italy Location within Friuli-Venezia Giulia
- Coordinates: 45°57′N 12°39′E
- Country: Italy
- Region: Friuli-Venezia Giulia
- Province: Pordenone
- Frazioni: Borgomeduna, Rorai Grande, San Gregorio, Torre, Vallenoncello, Villanova di Pordenone

Government
  - Mayor: Alessandro Basso (FdI)

Area
  - Total: 38.2 km^{2} (14.7 sq mi)
- Elevation: 24 m (79 ft)

Population (30 June 2025)
  - Total: 52,632
  - Density: 1,380/km^{2} (3,570/sq mi)
- Demonym: Pordenonesi
- Time zone: UTC+1 (CET)
  - Summer (DST): UTC+2 (CEST)
- Postal code: 33170
- Dialing code: 0434
- ISTAT code: 093033
- Patron saint: Saint Mark
- Saint day: April 25
- Website: Official website

Pordenone (Italian: [pordeˈnoːne]; Venetian and Friulian: Pordenon) is a city and comune (municipality) in the Italian region of Friuli-Venezia Giulia, the capital of the regional decentralization entity of Pordenone.

The name comes from Latin Portus Naonis, meaning "port on the Noncello River".

== History ==
Pordenone was created at the beginning of the High Middle Ages as a river port on the Noncello, with the name Portus Naonis. In the area, however, there were already villas and agricultural settlements from the Roman age, especially in the area of the town of Torre.

Between 1257 and 1270 Pordenone was conquered by Ottokar II of Bohemia, who was eventually defeated in 1277, when the city was brought back to the Empire, under Rodolph I of Habsburg.

In 1278, after having been administered by several feudatories, the city was handed over to the Habsburg family, forming an Austrian enclave within the territory of the Patriarchal State of Friuli. In the 14th century, Pordenone grew substantially due to the flourishing river trades, gaining the status of city in December 1314.

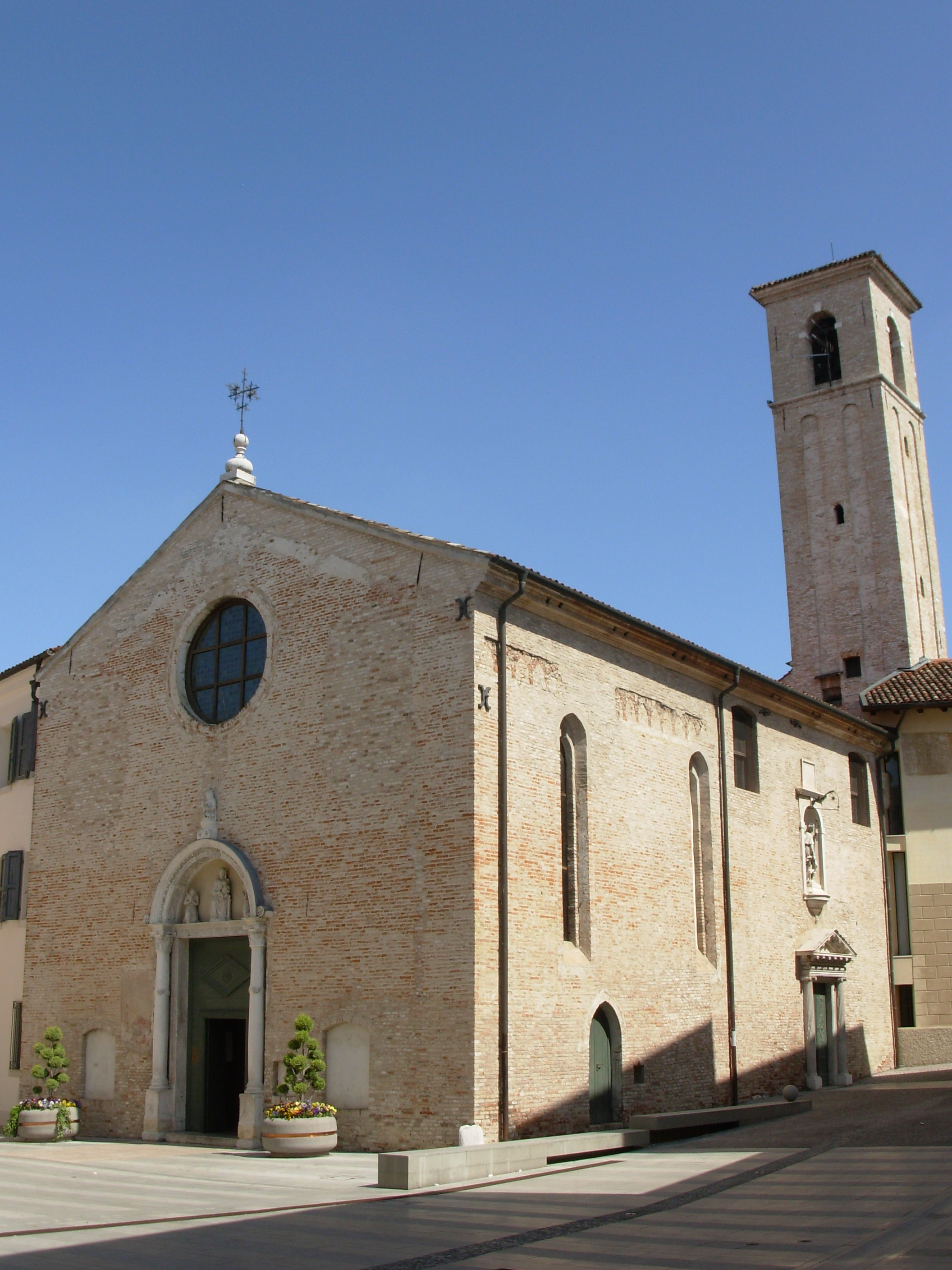
Church of Santa Maria degli Angeli

In 1508, after the failed invasion of the Republic of Venice by Emperor Maximilian, the city was seized by Venice. Despite temporary Austrian occupation during the subsequent War of the League of Cambrai (1509–16), the Venetian sovereignty over Pordenone was confirmed in 1516. Until 1537, the town was ruled by the feudal family d'Alviano, as a reward for Bartolomeo d'Alviano's military service to the Republic. Under Venice a new port was built and the manufacturers improved.

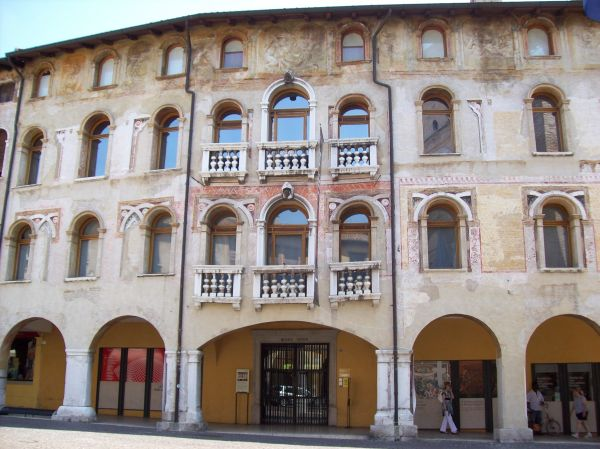
Palazzo Ricchieri, built in the 14th century

After the Napoleonic period, Pordenone was included in the Austrian possessions in Italy (Kingdom of Lombardy–Venetia). The railway connection, including Pordenone railway station (1855), and the construction of the Pontebbana road brought on the decline of the port, but spurred substantial industrial development (especially for the working of cotton). Pordenone was annexed to Italy in 1866.

The cotton sector decayed after the damage of World War I and failed completely after the 1929 crisis. After World War II, the local Zanussi firm became a world giant of household appliances, and in 1968, Pordenone became capital of the province with the same name, including territory belonging to Udine.

After World War II, Pordenone, as well as the rest of Friuli-Venezia Giulia, became a garrison for many military units, in order to prevent a socialist Yugoslavian invasion from the east.

The heavy military presence boosted the economy of the once-depressed area.

Pordenone is as now garrison of the 132nd Armored Brigade "Ariete".

== Geography ==
The territory of Pordenone is located in the lowlands of the Po-Venetian Valley, south of Venetian Prealps and the Alpine foothills of Friuli.

The lowlands of Pordenone is characterized by an abundance of water and by the "phenomenon" of resurgence.

=== Climate ===
Climate in this area has mild differences between highs and lows, and there is adequate rainfall year-round. The Köppen climate classification subtype for this climate is "Cfa" (Humid Subtropical Climate).

Climate data for Pordenone (1991–2020)
Month	Jan	Feb	Mar	Apr	May	Jun	Jul	Aug	Sep	Oct	Nov	Dec	Year
Mean daily maximum °C (°F)	8.2 (46.8)	10.2 (50.4)	14.6 (58.3)	18.9 (66.0)	23.4 (74.1)	27.4 (81.3)	29.5 (85.1)	29.5 (85.1)	24.7 (76.5)	19.2 (66.6)	13.4 (56.1)	8.8 (47.8)	19.0 (66.2)
Daily mean °C (°F)	3.8 (38.8)	5.1 (41.2)	9.2 (48.6)	13.3 (55.9)	17.8 (64.0)	21.8 (71.2)	23.7 (74.7)	23.5 (74.3)	19.0 (66.2)	14.1 (57.4)	9.0 (48.2)	4.4 (39.9)	13.7 (56.7)
Mean daily minimum °C (°F)	−0.7 (30.7)	0.1 (32.2)	3.7 (38.7)	7.8 (46.0)	12.3 (54.1)	16.2 (61.2)	17.8 (64.0)	17.5 (63.5)	13.4 (56.1)	9.1 (48.4)	4.7 (40.5)	0.1 (32.2)	8.5 (47.3)
Average precipitation mm (inches)	74.0 (2.91)	77.1 (3.04)	91.6 (3.61)	117.1 (4.61)	137.6 (5.42)	120.0 (4.72)	94.9 (3.74)	117.6 (4.63)	131.7 (5.19)	144.4 (5.69)	162.1 (6.38)	104.7 (4.12)	1,372.8 (54.06)
Average precipitation days (≥ 1.0 mm)	6.2	5.7	7.0	9.1	10.4	9.8	8.6	8.3	8.3	8.2	8.6	7.2	97.4
Source: Istituto Superiore per la Protezione e la Ricerca Ambientale

== Society ==
=== Demographic evolution ===
Historical population

Year	Pop.	±%
1861	?	—
1871	9,561	—
1881	11,152	+16.6%
1901	13,642	+22.3%
1911	18,141	+33.0%
1921	21,927	+20.9%

Year	Pop.	±%
1931	23,481	+7.1%
1936	22,174	−5.6%
1951	27,171	+22.5%
1961	34,055	+25.3%
1971	47,364	+39.1%
1981	52,094	+10.0%

Year	Pop.	±%
1991	50,192	−3.7%
2001	49,122	−2.1%
2011	50,583	+3.0%
2021	51,617	+2.0%

Source: Data from ISTAT

=== Foreign ethnicities and minorities ===
There were 7,876 foreigners residing in Pordenone as of January 1, 2025, representing 15.1% of the resident population.. The ten largest ethnic minorities are listed as follows:

1. Romania, 1,768
2. Albania, 849
3. Pakistan, 818
4. Ghana, 552
5. Ukraine, 428
6. Bangladesh, 360
7. China, 259
8. Morocco, 231
9. Moldova, 162
10. Colombia, 143

=== Local languages and dialects ===
In ancient times, the Friulian language was spoken in Pordenone. Under the Venetian rule the Venetian language – closer to modern standard Italian – was subsequently introduced in a form which developed into the modern days Pordenone dialect. The town is surrounded by Friulian-speaking communities (though Venetian features can be found there as well).

However, Friulian is protected in town in accordance with the Regional Law of December 18, 2007, n. 29, "Norms for the protection, promotion and enhancement of the Friulian language".

== Economy ==
Pordenone is known for the production of ceramics and terracotta. The city, which has always been an agricultural area, developed significantly in the nineteenth century in the textile sector, in parallel with the industrial revolution and industrial development accompanies the post-war period.

Following the 2007 global financial crisis, Pordenone experienced a deepening economic crisis. This was compounded by several factors, including, on the one hand, the country's uncompetitiveness, labor costs, poor infrastructure, overly expensive energy, and a lack of funding for innovation.

The city's decline is being countered by the fact that Pordenone has diversified industrial sectors, divided into industrial districts (Brugnera, Maniago, Meduno, San Vito al Tagliamento), made up of small and medium-sized enterprises capable, of facing the crisis and helping on the revitalization of the area. In 2022 the most important companies operate in the household appliances sector, as well as metalworking, furniture, and food industries.

== Monuments and places of interest ==
=== Religious buildings ===
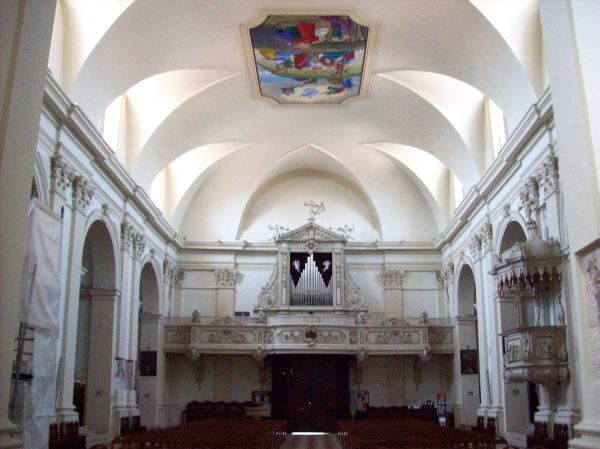
St. Mark Cathedral

- Cathedral of St. Mark (Duomo) was built from 1363 in Romanesque-Gothic style and restored in the 16th and 18th centuries. It houses a famous fresco of San Rocco and an altarpiece depicting the Virgin of Mercy by the native Renaissance painter Giovanni Antonio de' Sacchis (commonly known as Il Pordenone). Also inside the church are preserved the baptistery and the font by Giovanni Antonio Pilacorte, some fragments of frescoes of the circle of Gentile da Fabriano and a painting by Tintoretto. It has a 79-metre (259 ft) bell tower.
- Church of St. Mary of the Angels, also known as Church of the wooden Christ. The church was built in 1309 and it is characterized by an entrance portal in Istrian stone by Giovanni Antonio Pilacorte. Inside the sacred building they are kept a crucifix dating from the 1466 of Johannes Teutonicus and remains of a cycle of fourteenth-century frescoes. They are worthy of mention: the Saint Barbara by Gianfrancesco da Tolmezzo and the Our Lady of Sorrows, fresco from the first half of the fourteenth century. On the left wall of the church it is possible to admire a Madonna of humility(fourteenth-century fresco of the school of Vitale da Bologna)
- Parish Church of San George. Neoclassical church, characterized by the nineteenth-century bell tower, column Doric (architect Giovanni Battista Bassi).
- The church of the Santissima Trinità ("Holy Trinity"), alongside the Noncello river. It has an octagonal plant and frescoes by Giovanni Maria Calderari, pupil of Il Pordenone.
- Church of Blessed Odoric of Pordenone, built by architect Mario Botta in 1990–1992.
- Church of S. Ulderico, located in Villanova suburb. Contains frescoes by Il Pordenone and the font and baptistery are by Giovanni Antonio Pilacorte.
- Parish Church of St. Lawrence Martyr, in the frazione of Roraigrande, contains the baptismal font of Renaissance sculptors Donato and Alvise Casella. Inside it is possible to admire a cycle of frescoes by Giovanni Antonio de 'Sacchis'.

=== Secular buildings ===
The town has many mansions and palaces, in particular along the ancient "Greater Contrada", today Corso Vittorio Emanuele II (wonderful example of Venetian porticoes and called by some small "waterless Grand Canal"). Below is a list of the most important in terms of architectural and artistic.

- The Gothic Communal Palace (1291–1395). The clock-tower of the loggia, designed by painter Pomponio Amalteo, was added in the 16th century to the main building.
- Palazzo Ricchieri: Built in the 13th century as a house fortress with a tower, it was rebuilt to house the Ricchieri family. It now houses the Civic Art Museum.
- Palazzo Polacco – Barbarich – Scaramuzza.

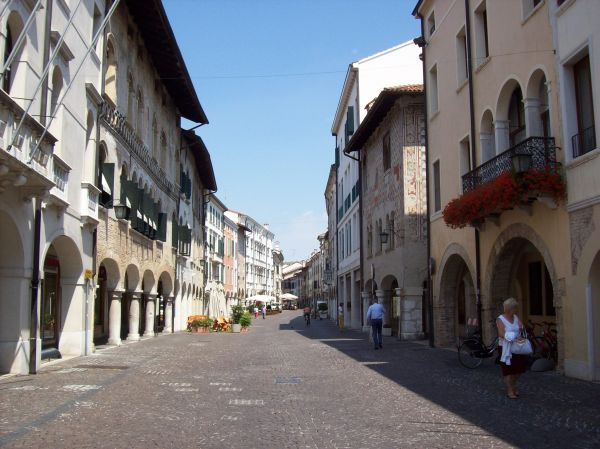
Corso Vittorio Emanuele II, the main street in the historical center of Pordenone

- Palazzo Rorario – Spelladi – Silvestri, headquarters of the municipal gallery "Harry Bertoia".
- Palazzo Mantica – Cattaneo.
- Palazzo Mantica.
- Palazzo Gregoris.
- Casa Gregoris – Bassani.
- Palazzo Varmo – Pomo, also known as House of the Captains.
- Palazzo Crescendolo – Milani.
- Palazzo Popaite – Torriani – Policreti.
- Casa Simoni.
- Casa Pittini.
- Palazzo Domenichini – Varaschini.
- Palazzo Rosittis.
- Palazzo De Rubeis.

=== Castles ===
- Castello di Torre (late 12th century), residence of the Ragogna family and now seat of the Western Friuli Archaeological Museum. It was assaulted in 1402 by Imperial troops, who destroyed the castle. A few years later a tower was rebuilt.
- Castle of the ancient town of Pordenone, located in Piazza della Motta, now a prison.

=== Archaeological site ===
- Roman Villa of Torre, remains of a patrician villa discovered in the 1950s.

=== Venetian villas ===
In the city there are nine buildings protected by the Regional Institute Venetian Villas (IRVV). Worthy of note are:

- Villa Cattaneo, the Gaspera, (seventeenth century), which is characterized by a high arched pediment (Villanova of Pordenone);
- Villa Cattaneo, Cirielli Barbini, probably dating back to 700 (Vallenoncello of Pordenone).

=== Industrial archeology ===
The urban conglomerate of Pordenone is characterized by the presence of the ruins of the industries dating back to the nineteenth century, examples of industrial archeology.

== Infrastructure and transport ==
=== Road ===
The main roads serving Pordenone are the Autostrada A28 and the Strada statale 13 Pontebbana (SS13).

=== Bus ===
The local transportation company in Pordenone is called ATAP. It provides ten "urban routes", which serve the municipal territory and all surrounding neighborhoods, and several "extraurban routes" which cover the whole Pordenone province, about twenty of them connecting the town directly with other destinations, including Aviano, the Venice International Airport and Lignano Sabbiadoro.

=== Railway ===
Pordenone railway station, opened in 1855, is located on the Venice–Udine railway. Although it is not a junction or terminal station, it is used by 3 million passengers a year.

=== Air ===
Trieste Airport and Venice-Treviso (TSF) Airport are the nearest air connectivity, approximately 75 kilometres (47 miles) away from the city.

== Education ==
As concerns public general education, Pordenone hosts nine kindergartens, twelve primary schools, four first grade secondary schools, the Flora Professional School of Commerce, Culinary Studies, Hospitality Training and Social Services, the Zanussi Professional School of Industry and Crafts, the Matiussi High School of Economics, two Schools of Technologies (J.F. Kennedy and Pertini). The licei (grammar schools) in town are Grigoletti Scientific High School and Leopardi-Majorana High School of Classics and Science. Alongside public schools, some private schools also exist in Pordenone.

Pordenone hosts a local branch of the University of Trieste, whose didactic includes a double degree Master study program in Production Engineering and Management with the University of Lippe, Germany. Other curricula include B.Sc. courses in Multimedial Sciences & Technologies and Nursing and a M.Sc. course in Multimedia Communication and IT, offered by the University of Udine.

The university building on Via Prasecco was designed by Japanese architect Toyo Ito.

== Sport ==
Pordenone is home to the Ottavio Bottecchia Stadium, on via dello Stadio, a multipurpose 3,000-seats facility once serving as a soccer field for the local team, Pordenone Calcio which is now playing at Stadio Omero Tognon, stadium of the city of Fontanafredda, and still as velodrome used for both national and international track cycling competitions. In 2001, the facility hosted one round of the UCI Track Cycling World Cup. It is considered one of the most important outdoor velodromes in the world.

The site of the stadium includes tennis courts as well as an athletics field.

Birthplace of accomplished NBA player Reggie Jackson.

Volleyball Cornacchia World Cup since 1983 - U19 / U17 (Boys / Girls) in Pordenone

== Culture ==
Sleeping Beauty awakes. This industrial town in Friuli has put on a new dress and got rid of its past Cinderella image and its ugly duckling complex. Pordenone now banks on culture, also to bring together people from more than one-hundred ethnic groups living in town

— Elena Del Savio, quiTOURING.

=== Literature ===
Pordenone has hosted every year, for more than a decade, the book festival pordenonelegge.it, which includes book stalls being placed all over the town center, as well as interviews with Italian and international authors and lectures by journalists and scholars.

=== Film ===
Pordenone has been the primary host to the Le Giornate del cinema muto, a festival of silent film, since 1981, excepting an eight-year lapse after the host theater, Cinema-Teatro Verdi, was being demolished and rebuilt. The nearby town of Sacile hosted the festival from 1999 to 2006.

Pordenone is also home to the FMK International Short Film Festival.

=== Music ===
In the 1980s, Pordenone was the hub of the Italian punk rock scene.

Punk-rock band Prozac+ and alternative rock band Tre Allegri Ragazzi Morti were formed in the 1990s in Pordenone. And in 2005 the Reggae band Mellow Mood was formed in Pordenone.

Since 1991, the town has hosted each summer the Pordenone Blues Festival, expanding its scope in 2010 encompassing the fields of performing arts, literature and visual arts. Notable guests over the years include Kool & the Gang, Steve Hackett, Rival Sons, Anastacia, Ronnie Jones and Ana Popović. Performers playing at this festival include artists based in Italy, Germany, Slovenia, Spain, Serbia, Croatia, Hungary and other countries.

=== Museums and galleries ===
==== Diocesan Museum of Sacred Art – Diocese of Concordia-Pordenone ====
Located in the Pastoral Activities Centre, designed by Othmar Barth (1988), retains a artistic heritage from churches and religious buildings of the Roman Catholic Diocese of Concordia-Pordenone.

==== Town Art Museum ====
The museum is housed in the Palazzo Ricchieri, an important place to understand the art of Veneto and Friuli-Venezia Giulia. In it houses works by various painters, such as Pordenone, P. Amalteo, Varotari, Pietro della Vecchia, O. Politi and Michelangelo Grigoletti.

==== Archaeological Museum of Western Friuli ====
The museum, housed since 2006 in the ancient castle of the Torre of Pordenone, the last residence of Count Giuseppe di Ragogna, illustrates the archaeological heritage of the province of Pordenone. Of particular significance are the finds from the caves Pradis and pile-dwelling (or stilt house) of Palù di Livenza (UNESCO World Heritage Site – Prehistoric pile dwellings around the Alps).

==== Gallery of Modern and Contemporary Art "Armando Pizzinato" ====
The museum is housed in a Venetian villa of the city park, once owned by industrialist Galvani. In its rooms it houses paintings by Mario Sironi, Renato Guttuso, Corrado Cagli, Alberto Savinio, Filippo De Pisis, Giuseppe Zigaina, Armando Pizzinato and many others.

=== Newspapers ===
Two Italian daily newspapers have a local edition:

- Messaggero Veneto – Giornale del Friuli
- Il Gazzettino

== Tourisms ==
Pordenone is also the starting point for the province of Pordenone with its numerous sights. Extensive tourist information is provided by Pordenone Turismo. Since 2022, the Pordenone Greeters offer free tours for guests of the city and province. The group is a member of the international Greeter network.

== Twin towns – sister cities ==
Pordenone is twinned with:

- Ōkawa, Japan
- Poprad, Slovakia
- Spittal an der Drau, Austria

== Notable people ==
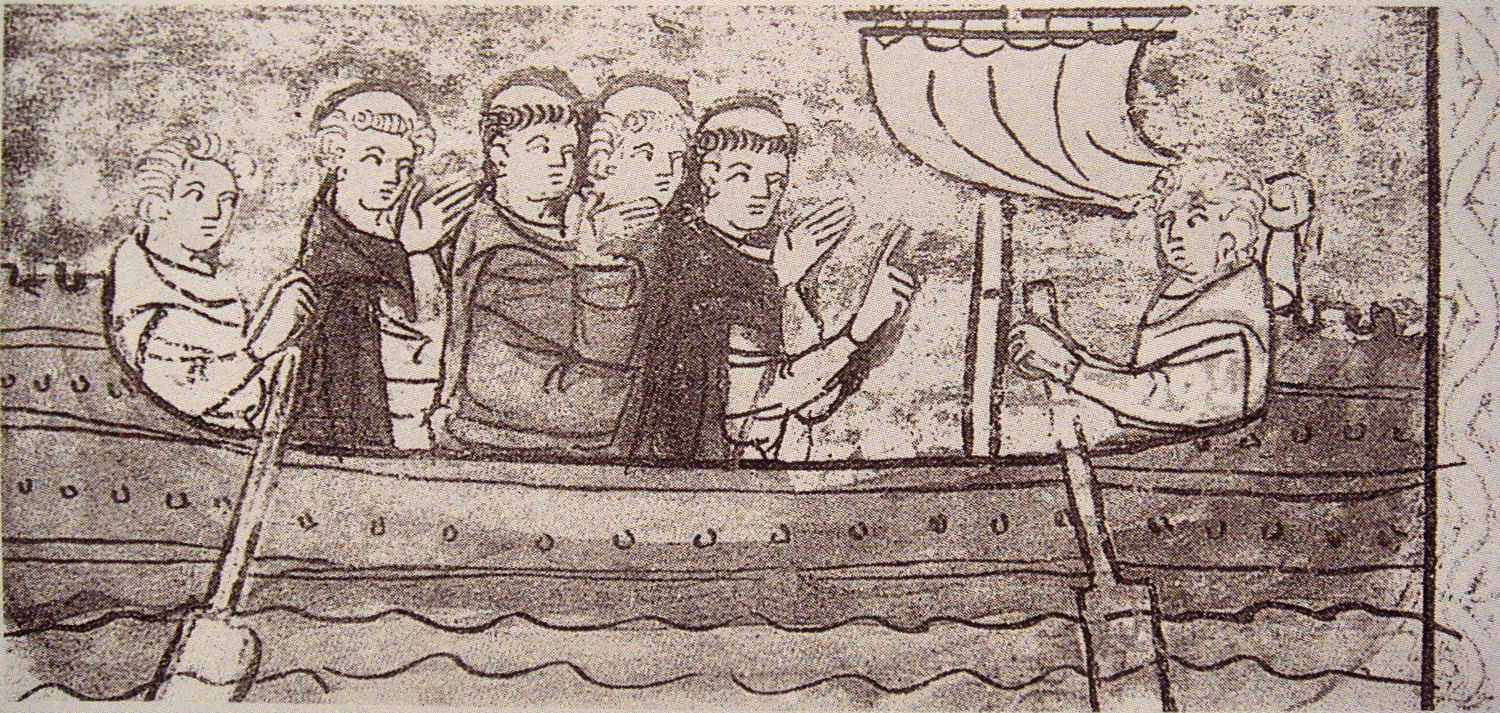
Departure of Odoric of Pordenone

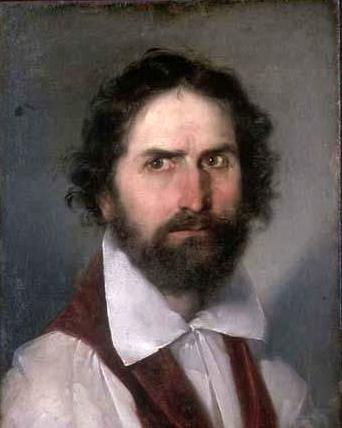
Michelangelo Grigoletti

- Odoric of Pordenone (1286–1331), Franciscan friar and missionary explorer
- Il Pordenone (c. 1484–1539), byname of Giovanni Antonio de' Sacchis, mannerist painter
- Hieronymus Rorarius (Pordenone 1485–1556), envoy for Charles V of Habsburg, and papal nuncio
- Giovanni Maria Zaffoni (c. 1500 – after 1570), painter of the Renaissance period
- Pomponio Amalteo (1505–1588), painter of the Venetian school
- Girolamo Michelangelo Grigoletti (1801–1870), painter, active in a Neoclassical style
- Valentina Pielich - Tina Vajtova (also Tina Vajtawa), (1900–1984), Resian Slovenian peddler and a folk storyteller of Resian fairy tales (lived in Pordenone for 17 years and died there)
- Rudy Buttignol (born 1951), Canadian television network executive and entrepreneur
- Davide Toffolo (born 1965, Pordenone), author of comics books
- Raffaello D'Andrea (born 1967), robotics engineer
- Luca Manfè (born 1981) chef and entrepreneur

=== Sport ===
- Stefano Lombardi (born 1976), footballer
- Luca Rossetti (born 1976), rally driver
- Marzia Caravelli (born 1981), hurdler
- Daniele Molmentii (born 1984), slalom canoeist
- Federico Gerardi (born 1987), footballer
- Reggie Jackson (born 1990), American basketball player
- Nicola de Marco (born 1990), racing driver
- Alessia Trost (born 1993), high jumper
- Ivan Provedel (born 1994), footballer
- Egidio Mguizami (born 1994), footballer
- Aurora Fochesato (born 2006), darts player
