= Elio Ciol =

Italian photographer and publisher

Italia Black and White, a 1985 collection.

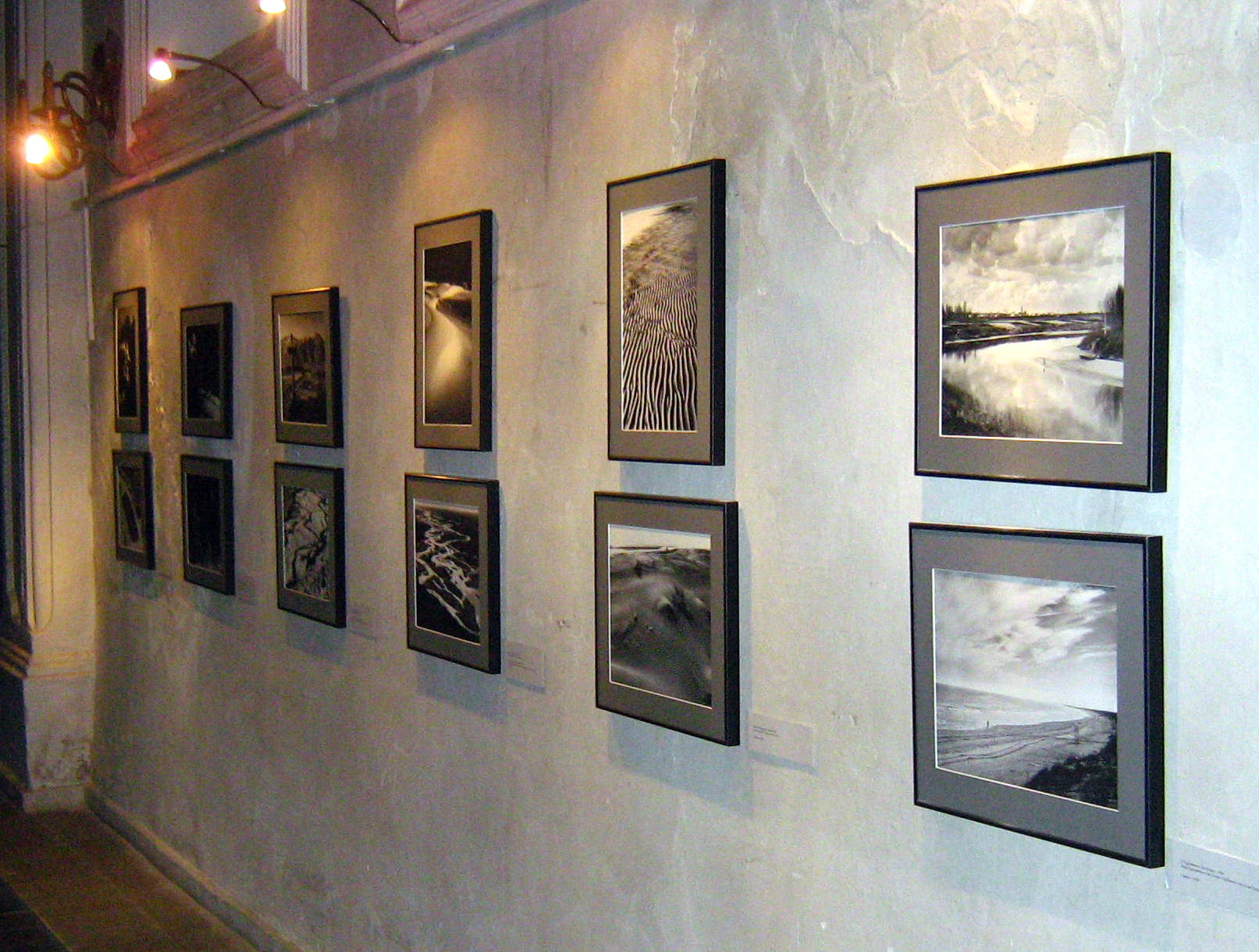
Exhibit in Sejny (Poland) in July 2009

Elio Ciol (born 1929) is an Italian photographer and publisher who was born in Casarsa della Delizia in Friuli-Venezia Giulia, the region where he has principally lived and worked. His father was a photographer who kept a studio in their hometown and Elio was fascinated by the technical aspects and worked in the darkroom as a boy. A formative experience was when, during the Nazi occupation, a German doctor brought in films with photographs of the countryside rather than of people, "photographs that I myself should have been able to do and which I had not done or even imagined." He began practising photography at fifteen, worked full-time in the studio from nineteen, and spent an increasing amount of his free time taking photographs for his own interests. A trip to Assisi in 1951 made a great impression; Ciol subsequently spent much time there, taking many photographs.

Dissatisfied with the conventions demanded in Italian photographic contests, Ciol ambitiously entered contests abroad; in 1955 and 1956 he was encouraged by favorable mentions in the American magazine Popular Photography.

Ciol was greatly influenced by the ideas of Luigi Crocenzi, emphasizing sequence rather than single images when illustrating a book or other story (an example had been Crocenzi's Conversazione in Sicilia, with text by Elio Vittorini). Ciol moved to Milan in 1963 to work on projects for the firm of Altimani; this soon ran into financial difficulties and Ciol returned to Casarsa, but invigorated with new ideas for the illustration and layout of books. He has illustrated dozens of books since that time.

Ciol has concentrated on creating a photographic record and archive of Italian works of art, architecture, landscapes, and archaeological sites and artefacts, particularly in Friuli. His works are black and white, sometimes employing infrared-sensitive film. Some of his photographs show people so close as to be recognizable, but more often people appear as small figures within landscapes. More often still the landscapes are devoid of people.

== Bibliography ==
- Ciol, Elio. Italia Black and White, ed. Giovanni Chiaramonte. Milan: Jaca ("Punto e Virgola"), 1985. ISBN 88-16-64008-1 A survey of Ciol's work, with about a hundred full-page prints, and all texts and captions in both Italian and English.
- Ciol, Elio. Assisi. Milan: Motta, 1991. ISBN 88-7179-024-3
- Ciol, Elio. Venezia. Milan: Motta, 1995. ISBN 88-7179-090-1
- Ciol, Elio. Dove l'infinito è presente / The Presence of Infinity. Tricesimo, Udine: Roberto Vattori, 1996. Ten portfolios, each of between ten and twelve black and white photographs on a theme or of a place, published on the occasion of their exhibition in September/October 1996 at the Galleria della Loggia, Assisi. The photographs are of Italy (especially Assisi), Yosemite (California), Yemen (notably Sanaa), and Greece. Captions are in Italian only, but each portfolio has an introductory text (by one of a number of critics) in both Italian and English.
- Ciol, Elio. Cinquant'anni di fotografia, ed. Giuseppe Bergamini. Milan: Motta, 1999. ISBN 88-7179-202-5
- Ciol, Elio. L'enchantement de la vision. Campanotto, 2000. ISBN 88-456-0265-6
- Ciol, Elio, and Stefano Ciol. La facciata del Duomo di Orvieto: Teologia in figura. Silvana, 2002. ISBN 88-8215-522-6
- Ciol, Elio. Concrete astrazioni, a cura di Sergio Momesso e Carlo Sala, Punto Marte Edizioni, 2007. ISBN 978-88-902036-7-1
