= Egidio Mguizami =

Angolan-Italian footballer

Personal information
- Date of birth: 26 April 1994 (age 32)
- Position: Striker

Youth career
- Portogruaro

Senior career*
Years	Team	Apps	(Gls)
2011–2013	Portogruaro	2	(0)
2013–2014	SC Lüstringen		
2014–2015	Woluwe-Zaventem		
2015–2016	Géants Athois		
- * Club domestic league appearances and goals as of 10 June 2014

Egidio Mguizami (born 26 April 1994) is an Angolan-Italian professional footballer who plays as a striker.

== Career ==
Born in Rio de Janeiro, Brazil, he moved to Italy as a child and later joined Portogruaro, being initially assigned to the reserve team in the campionato berretti.

On 4 March 2012 Egidio made his Lega Pro debut, coming on as a late substitute in a 0–4 home loss against U.S. Cremonese.
