= Moimacco =

Moimacco Muimans (Friulian)
- Comune
- Comune di Moimacco
- Coat of arms

- Location within Italy Location within Friuli-Venezia Giulia
- Coordinates: 46°6′N 13°23′E
- Country: Italy
- Region: Friuli-Venezia Giulia
- Province: Province of Udine (UD)
- Frazioni: Bottenicco

Government
  - Mayor: Manolo Sicco

Area
  - Total: 11.82 km^{2} (4.56 sq mi)
- Elevation: 121 m (397 ft)

Population (March 2009)
  - Total: 1,638
  - Density: 138.6/km^{2} (358.9/sq mi)
- Demonym: Moimacchesi
- Time zone: UTC+1 (CET)
  - Summer (DST): UTC+2 (CEST)
- Postal code: 33040
- Dialing code: 0432
- Patron saint: St. Mary of the Assumption
- Saint day: 15 August
- Website: Official website

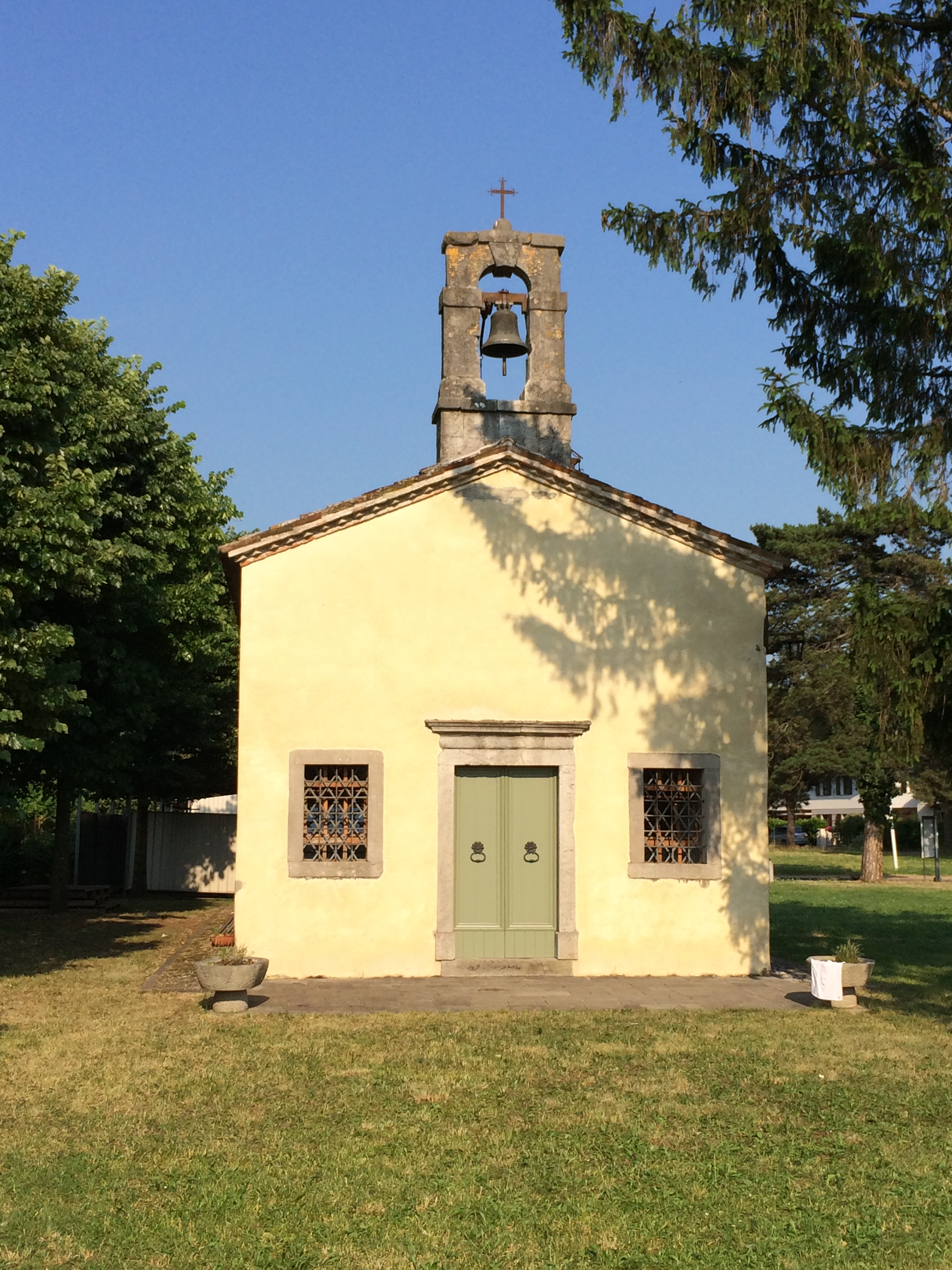
San Giovanni church

Moimacco (Friulian: Muimans) is small a town and comune (municipality) in the Regional decentralization entity of Udine in Friuli-Venezia Giulia, north-east Italy. It is situated a few kilometres west of Cividale del Friuli, 121 metres (397 ft) above sea level.

== History ==
Located at the intersection of important trade routes, legend says that Moimacco was funded by an officer of the Roman army named Mommeius (or Mumius). Since its origins the economy of the village was tied to the neighboring center of Cividale.

== Economy ==
Today, Moimacco's industrial district provides jobs for workers commuting from close by cities. A few small farms are present as well.

== Main sights ==
Places of interest are the churches of S. Maria Assunta, San Giovanni and San Donato, the noble villas De Claricini and De Puppi, with splendid gardens and art collections.

== Food ==
Frico is a cheese and potatoes, or sometimes only cheese, pan fried pie. Other local products include salami and Montasio cheese.
