= Latisana =

Town in Friuli Venezia Giulia, Italy

Latisana Tisana (Friulian)
- Comune
- Città di Latisana
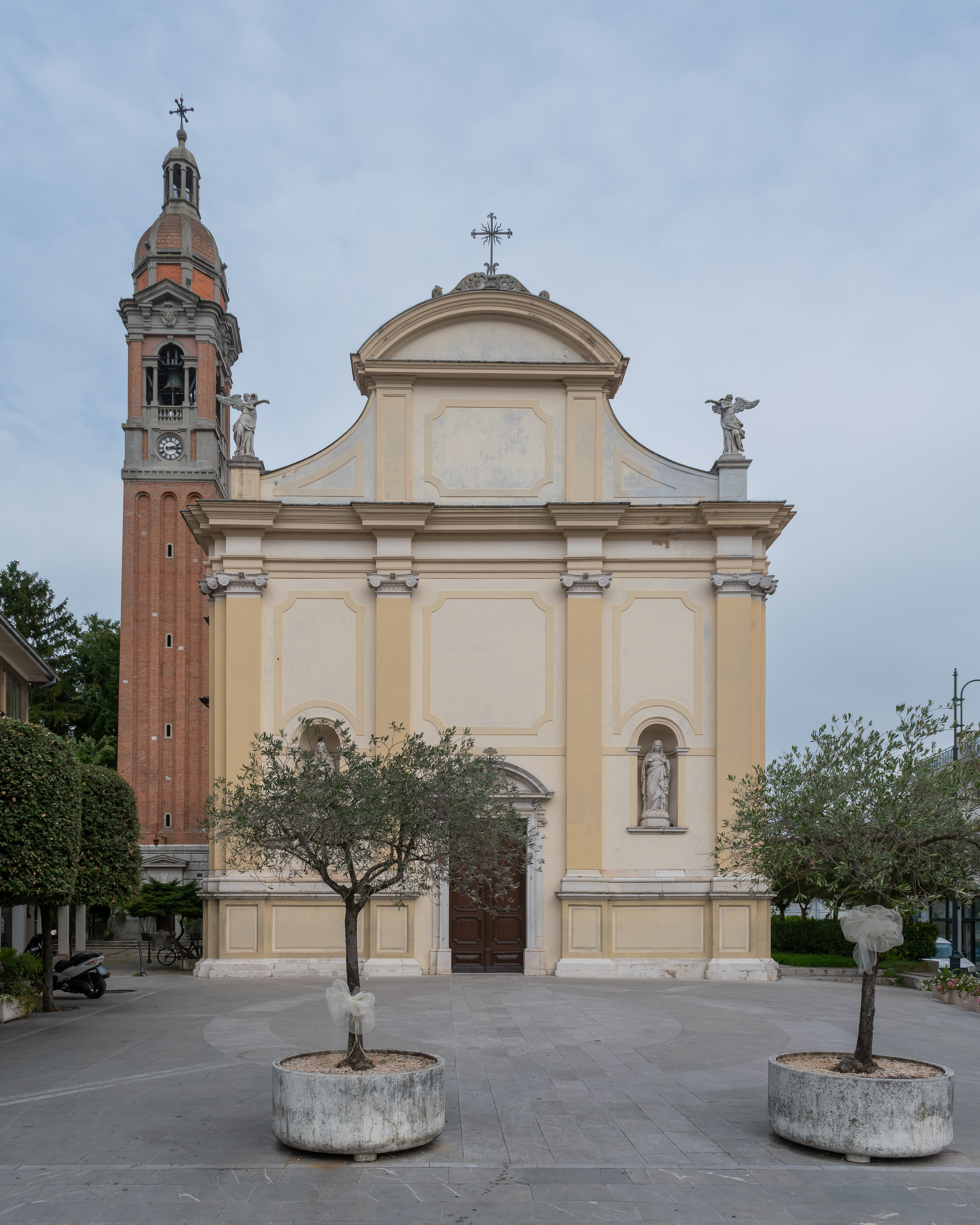
- Cathedral of Latisana

- Coat of arms

- Location of Latisana in Italy Latisana (Friuli-Venezia Giulia)
- Coordinates: 45°47′N 13°07′E
- Country: Italy
- Region: Friuli-Venezia Giulia
- Province: Udine (UD)
- Frazioni: Latisanotta, Gorgo, Pertegada, Latisana Marittima, Bevazzana

Government
  - Mayor: Lanfranco Sette (centre-right)

Area
  - Total: 37.8 km^{2} (14.6 sq mi)
- Elevation: 7 m (23 ft)

Population (31 August 2017)
  - Total: 13,539
  - Density: 358/km^{2} (928/sq mi)
- Demonym: Latisanesi
- Time zone: UTC+1 (CET)
  - Summer (DST): UTC+2 (CEST)
- Postal code: 33053
- Dialing code: 0431
- ISTAT code: 030046
- Patron saint: St. John the Baptist
- Saint day: June 24
- Website: Official website

Latisana (Friulian: Tisane, locally Tisana) is a town and comune (municipality) in the Regional decentralization entity of Udine in the region of Friuli-Venezia Giulia, north-eastern Italy, on the Tagliamento river.

== History ==
The city was probably a Roman post station (Mansio Apicilia) on the Via Annia which connected Concordia to Aquileia.

The city is first mentioned in 1072, and became an important river port in the 12 and 13th centuries, especially known for salt trade, under the counts of Gorizia. In the 12th century it became an autonomous commune, annexed by the Republic of Venice in 1420.

The trade declined in the late years of the Republic of Venice, and the city was acquired by the Austrian Empire with the Treaty of Campo Formio (1797). In 1814 it became part of the client Kingdom of Lombardy–Venetia and, in 1866, of the newly formed Kingdom of Italy.

During the 20th century wars it suffered heavy damage, especially in the bombing of 19 May 1944 that destroyed the historical centre. Further damage was caused by the floods of the Tagliamento in 1965 and 1966.

== Twin towns ==
Latisana is twinned with:

- Reichenau an der Rax, Austria, since 2005

== Main sights ==
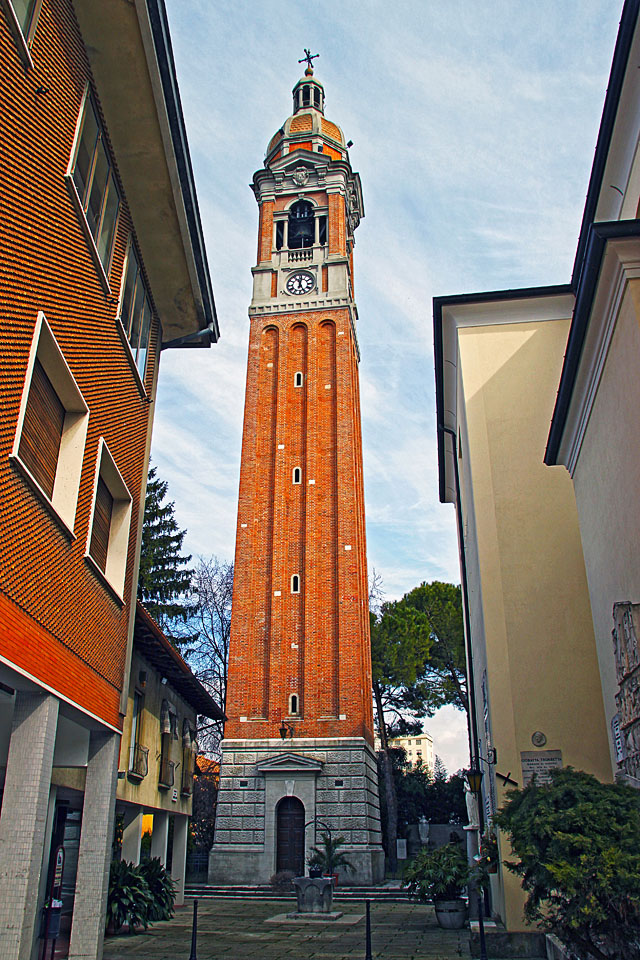
Latisana bell tower

The Cathedral (Duomo) was rebuilt in the 17th century over the old 1504 edifice. The main attractions are the canvas portraying the Baptism of Jesus (1567) by Paolo Veronese and a wooden Crucifix (1566) by Andrea Fosco. The choir has a Transfiguration (1591) by Marco Moro and the first altar on the left has a Holy Family with Saints by Giovan Battista Grassi (1568).

== Transportation ==
- Latisana-Lignano-Bibione railway station
