= Sacile railway station =

Railway station in Sacile, Italy

Sacile
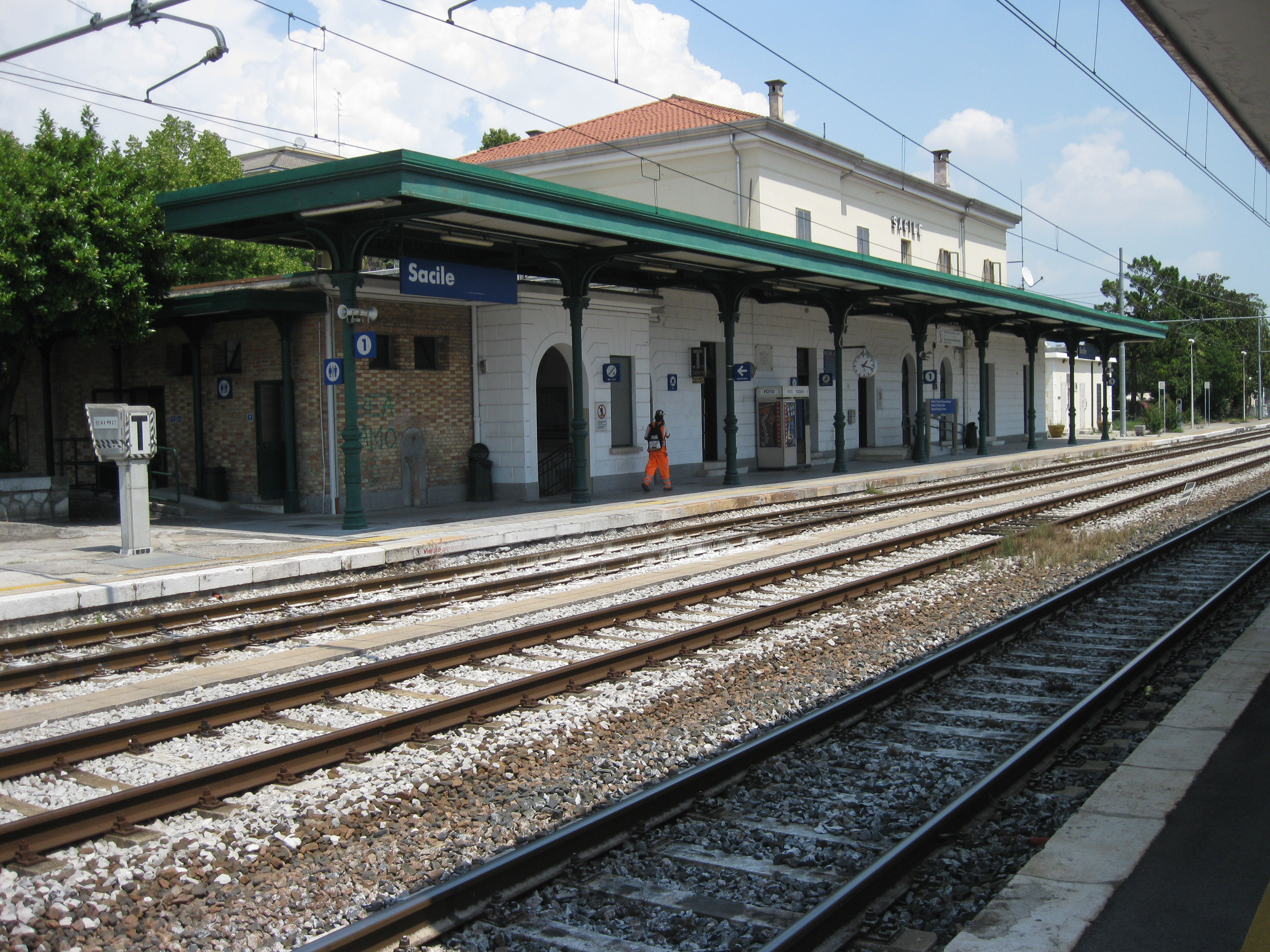
- Sacile railway station

General information
- Location: Piazza della Libertà 1, Sacile, Friuli-Venezia Giulia; Italy
- Coordinates: 45°56′54″N 12°29′54″E
- Owner: Rete Ferroviaria Italiana
- Operator: Trenitalia
- Lines: Venice–Udine railway Sacile-Pinzano railway
- Distance: 64.961 km (40.365 mi) from Venezia Mestre
- Platforms: 3
- Tracks: 5

Other information
- Classification: Silver

History
- Opened: 1855; 171 years ago
Location
- Location within Friuli-Venezia Giulia Location within Northern Italy Location within Italy

Sacile (Italian: Stazione di Sacile) is a railway station serving the town of Sacile, in the region of Friuli-Venezia Giulia, northern Italy. The station opened in 1855 and is located on the Venice–Udine railway and Sacile-Pinzano railway. The train services are operated by Trenitalia.

== History ==
The station was located on the Sacile-Vittorio Veneto railway until its closure in 1918. The line was dismantled in 1923. Train services on the Sacile-Pinzano railway are currently limited to Maniago.

== Train services ==
The station is served by the following service(s):

- Night train (Intercity Notte) Trieste - Udine - Venice - Padua - Bologna - Rome
- Express services (Regionale Veloce) Trieste - Gorizia - Udine - Treviso - Venice
- Regional services (Treno regionale) Trieste - Gorizia - Udine - Treviso - Venice
- Regional services (Treno regionale) Sacile - Aviano - Maniago - Pinzano - Gemona del Friuli Currently limited to Maniago

== Bus services ==
Buses have replaces trains to Pinzano since July 2012.

== See also ==
- History of rail transport in Italy
- List of railway stations in Friuli-Venezia Giulia
- Rail transport in Italy
- Railway stations in Italy
