= Casarsa railway station =

Railway station in Friuli-Venezia Giulia, Italy

Casarsa
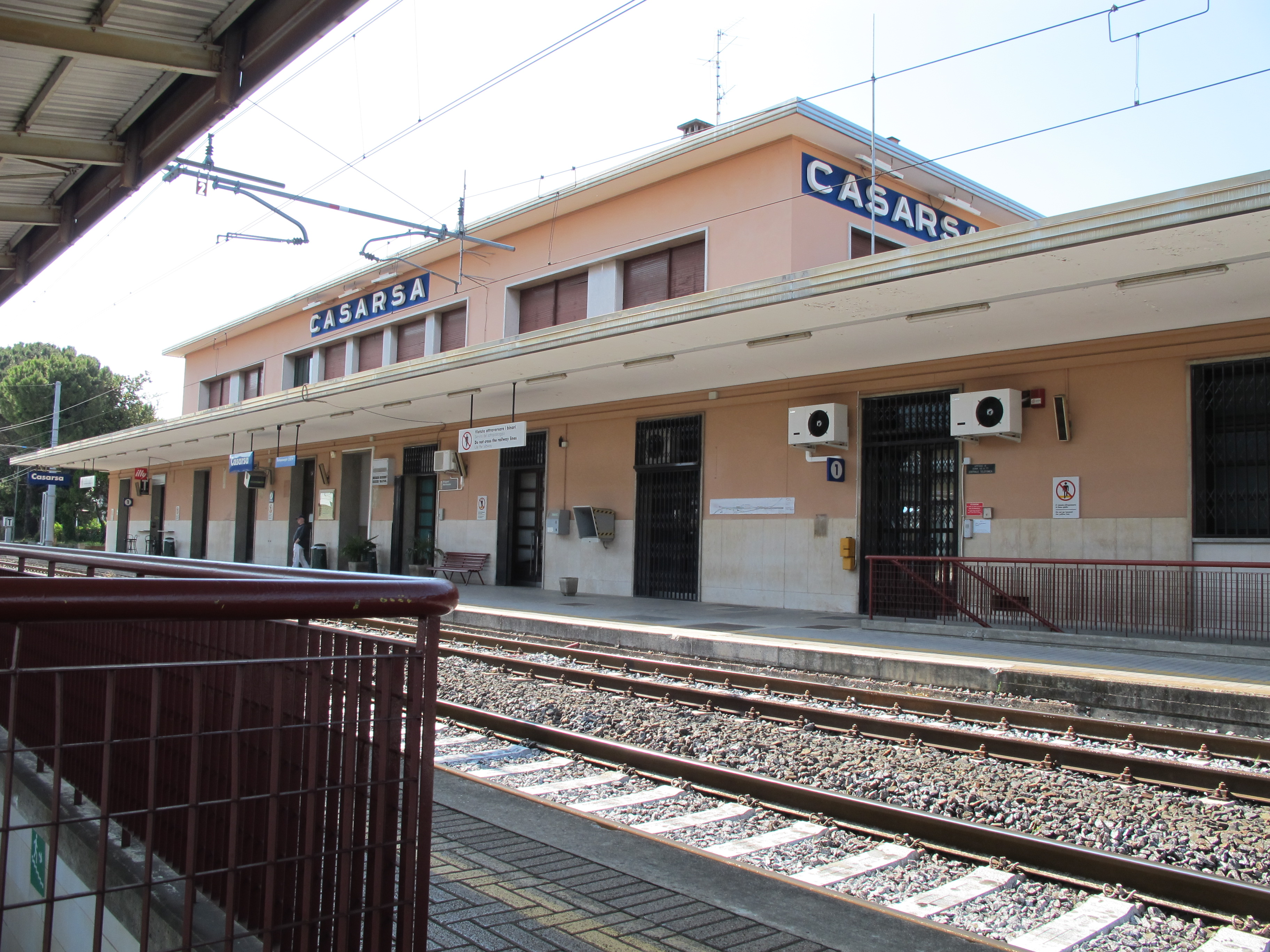
- Casarsa railway station

General information
- Location: Via IV Novembre 7, Casarsa della Delizia, Friuli-Venezia Giulia; Italy
- Coordinates: 45°57′11″N 12°50′27″E
- Owner: Rete Ferroviaria Italiana
- Operator: Trenitalia
- Lines: Venice–Udine railway Casarsa–Portogruaro railway
- Distance: 92.912 km (57.733 mi) from Venezia Mestre
- Platforms: 5

Other information
- Classification: Silver

History
- Opened: 1855; 171 years ago
Location
- Location within Friuli-Venezia Giulia Location within Northern Italy Location within Italy

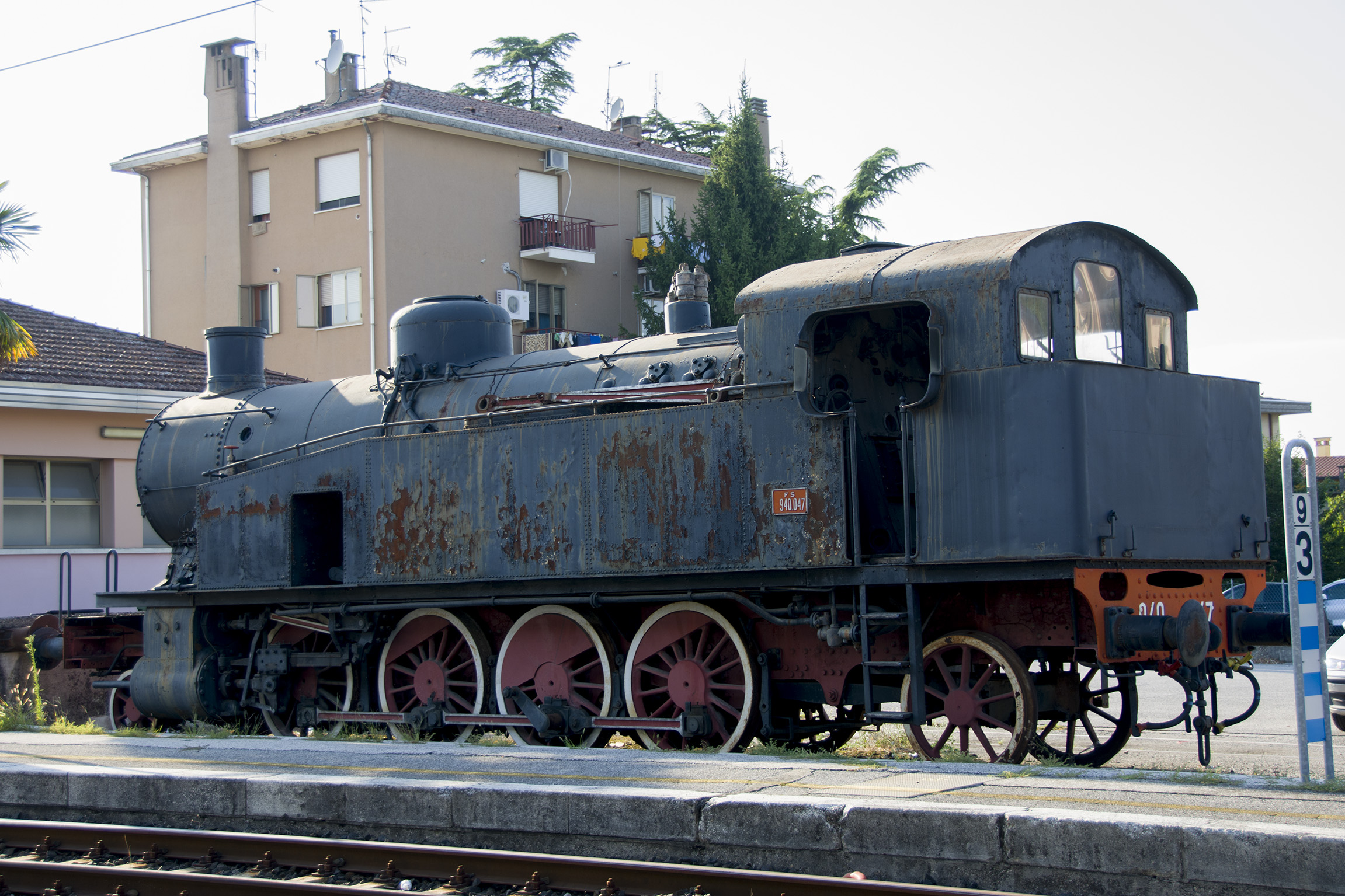
Steam engine 940.047 is on display at the station.

Casarsa (Italian: Stazione di Casarsa) is a railway station serving the town of Casarsa della Delizia, in the region of Friuli-Venezia Giulia, northern Italy. The station opened in 1855 and is located on the Venice–Udine railway and Casarsa–Portogruaro railway. The train services are operated by Trenitalia.

== History ==
The station was located on the Gemona del Friuli-Casarsa railway until its closure in 1987.

== Train services ==
The station is served by the following service(s):

- Night train (Intercity Notte) Trieste - Udine - Venice - Padua - Bologna - Rome
- Express services (Regionale Veloce) Trieste - Gorizia - Udine - Treviso - Venice
- Regional services (Treno regionale) Trieste - Gorizia - Udine - Treviso - Venice
- Local services (Treno regionale) Portogruaro - Casarsa della Delizia

== See also ==
- History of rail transport in Italy
- List of railway stations in Friuli-Venezia Giulia
- Rail transport in Italy
- Railway stations in Italy
