= San Giorgio di Nogaro =

San Giorgio di Nogaro San Zorz (Friulian)
- Comune
- Comune di San Giorgio di Nogaro; Comun di San Zorç di Noiâr
- Location within Italy Location within Friuli-Venezia Giulia
- Coordinates: 45°50′N 13°12′E
- Country: Italy
- Region: Friuli-Venezia Giulia
- Province: Udine (UD)
- Frazioni: Chiarisacco, Galli, Porto Nogaro, Villanova, Zellina, Zuccola

Area
  - Total: 25.8 km^{2} (10.0 sq mi)
- Elevation: 7 m (23 ft)

Population (Dec. 2004)
  - Total: 7,417
  - Density: 287/km^{2} (745/sq mi)
- Demonym: Sangiorgini
- Time zone: UTC+1 (CET)
  - Summer (DST): UTC+2 (CEST)
- Postal code: 33058
- Dialing code: 0431
- Website: Official website

San Giorgio di Nogaro (Friulian: Sant Zorç di Noiâr, locally San Zorz) is a comune (municipality) in the Regional decentralization entity of Udine in the Italian region of Friuli-Venezia Giulia, located about 50 kilometres (31 miles) northwest of Trieste and about 25 kilometres (16 mi) south of Udine. As of 31 December 2004, it had a population of 7,417 and an area of 25.8 square kilometres (10.0 mi^{2}).

The municipality of San Giorgio di Nogaro contains the frazioni (boroughs) Chiarisacco, Galli, Porto Nogaro, Villanova, Zellina, and Zuccola.

San Giorgio di Nogaro borders the following municipalities: Carlino, Castions di Strada, Grado, Marano Lagunare, Porpetto, Torviscosa.

== Demographic evolution ==
Historical population

Year	Pop.	±%
1861	?	—
1871	2,752	—
1881	2,886	+4.9%
1901	3,510	+21.6%
1911	4,624	+31.7%

Year	Pop.	±%
1921	4,753	+2.8%
1931	5,491	+15.5%
1936	5,972	+8.8%
1951	7,413	+24.1%
1961	7,123	−3.9%

Year	Pop.	±%
1971	7,398	+3.9%
1981	7,688	+3.9%
1991	7,581	−1.4%
2001	7,314	−3.5%

Source: Data from ISTAT

== International relations ==
=== Twin towns – Sister cities ===
San Giorgio di Nogaro is twinned with:

- Völkermarkt, Austria
- Mezohegyes, Hungary

== Transportation ==
- San Giorgio di Nogaro railway station
