= Cervignano del Friuli =

Cervignano del Friuli Sarvignan (Friulian)
- Comune
- Città di Cervignano del Friuli
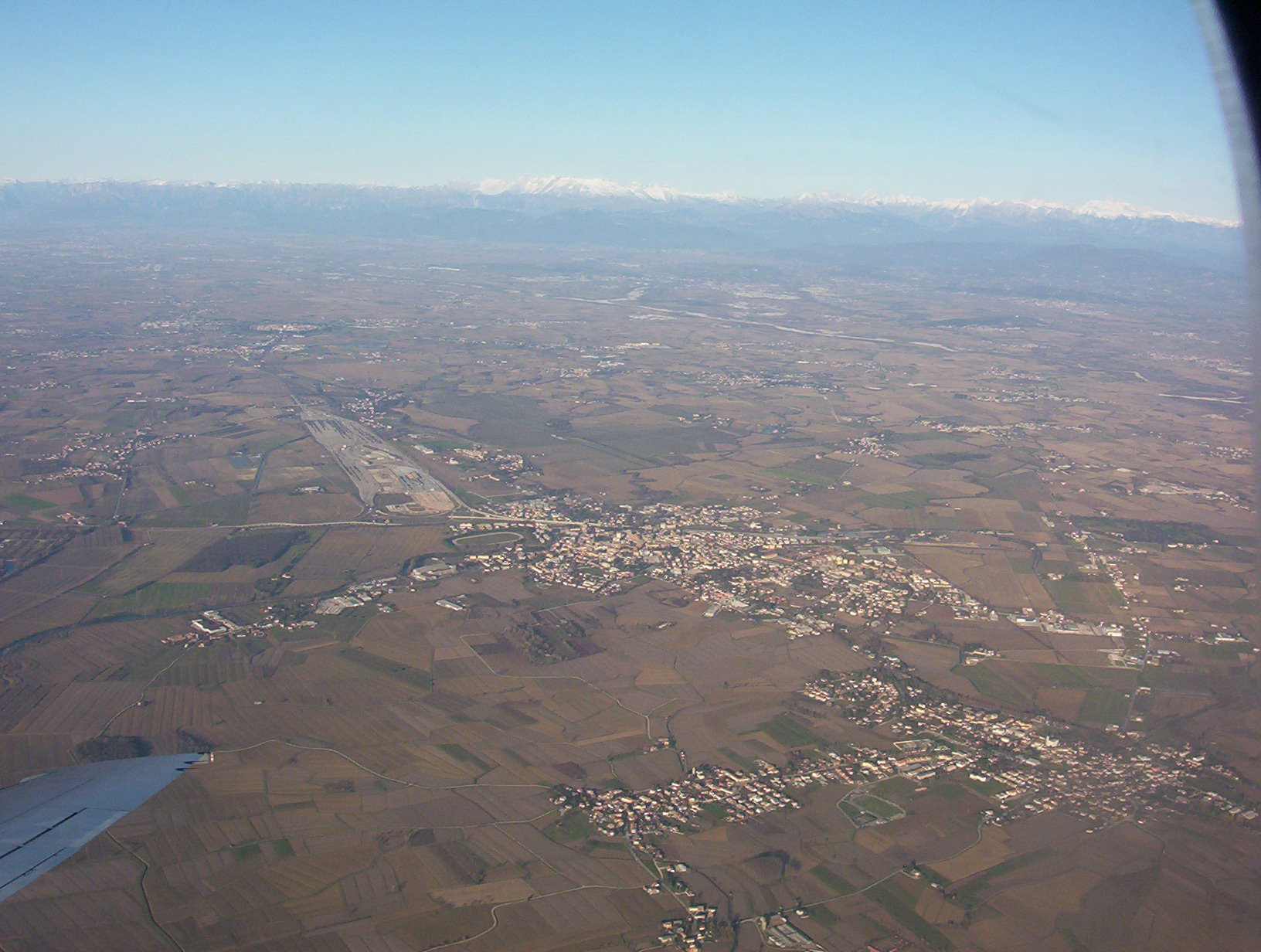
- Aerial view of Cervignano and Terzo di Aquileia; the Alps in the background.

- Location within Italy Location within Friuli-Venezia Giulia
- Coordinates: 45°49′23″N 13°20′6″E
- Country: Italy
- Region: Friuli-Venezia Giulia
- Province: Udine (UD)
- Frazioni: Scodovacca, Strassoldo, Muscoli

Government
  - Mayor: Andrea Balducci

Area
  - Total: 28 km^{2} (11 sq mi)
- Elevation: 2 m (6.6 ft)

Population (28 February 2017)
  - Total: 13,849
  - Density: 490/km^{2} (1,300/sq mi)
- Demonym: Cervignanesi
- Time zone: UTC+1 (CET)
  - Summer (DST): UTC+2 (CEST)
- Postal code: 33052
- Dialing code: 0431
- ISTAT code: 030023
- Patron saint: St. Michael
- Saint day: 29 September
- Website: Official website

Cervignano del Friuli (Friulian: Çarvignan, locally Sarvignan; Latin: Cervenianum; Slovene: Červinjan) is a comune (municipality) in the Regional decentralization entity of Udine, in Friuli-Venezia Giulia, Italy. It is the most important town of Bassa Friulana. It lies at about 12 kilometres (7 mi) from the Laguna di Grado and at about 18 kilometres (11 mi) from the Adriatic Sea; from the point of view of viability, its position is peculiar since it lies at the junction of the SS14, linking Venice to Trieste, and the SS352, linking Udine to Grado. Nevertheless, it is in Cervignano that the railroad from Austria, passing through Tarvisio and Udine, ends, and is linked to the one from Venice to Trieste. Its frazione (borough) of Strassoldo is one of I Borghi più belli d'Italia ("The most beautiful villages of Italy").

== History ==
Cervignano was born with the foundation of Aquileia in 181 B.C. by the Romans Lucio Manlio Acidino, Publio Scipione Nasica and Caio Flaminio, sent from Rome to defeat the barbarians menacing the eastern borders of Italy. As usual, the territory near Aquileia was populated, in order to establish a settlement in the area.

Some documents of 912 read about Cerveniana or Cirvignanum: the name comes from the name of an ancient Roman family, Cervenius or Cervonius, with the suffix -anus to mean the ownership of the land where Cervignano was born. The name, however, was wrongly linked to the Latin word cervus (or to the Italian cervo), meaning "deer", and evoking a large wood populated by deer; for that reason, a deer can be seen in the left section of the borough shield. The right section of the shield is an anchor, a reference to the ancient harbour on the Ausa river, relevant for the economic life of the town.

During the 11th century an abbey for the Order of Saint Benedict was built. It was dedicated to Saint Michael Archangel and it was controlled by the monastery of Aquileia and by the Count of Gorizia. In 1420 Cervignano was conquered by Venice and in 1521 returned to the County of Gorizia with the Worms Treaty. In 1615 was conquered by Venice during the War of Gradisca but it was for a very short period. The town became part of Italy after World War I.

In 1923 the municipality became part of the Province of Udine, along with other municipalities in the same area, and today still belongs to it.

== Transportation ==
- Cervignano–Aquileia–Grado railway station
