= Venice–Udine railway =

Railway line in Italy

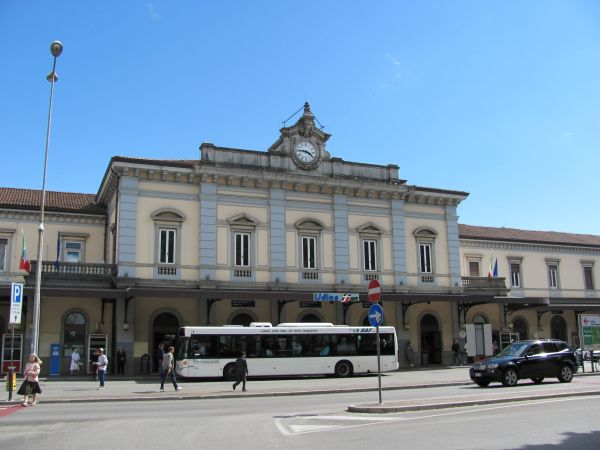
- Udine-stazionefront

Overview
- Native name: Ferrovia Venezia-Udine
- Owner: RFI
- Line number: 57, 62
- Locale: Veneto, Friuli-Venezia Giulia, Italy
- Termini: Venezia Santa Lucia; Udine

Service
- Route number: 14
- Operator(s): Trenitalia

History
- Opened: 1851–1860

Technical
- Line length: 135 km (84 mi)
- Track gauge: 1,435 mm (4 ft 8 1/2 in) standard gauge
- Electrification: 3000 V DC
- Operating speed: 150 km/h (93 mph)

The Venice–Udine railway is an Italian railway line connecting Venice, in Veneto, with Udine, in Friuli-Venezia Giulia. It follows the same route as state highway 13 (SS 13, "Pontebbana").

The railway infrastructure is managed by the Rete Ferroviaria Italiana, which classifies it as one of its primary lines.

It has a maximum line speed of 150 km/h (93 mph).

== History ==
| Section | Opened |
|---|---|
| Mestre–Marghera | 13 December 1842 (Note: Part of the Milan–Venice railway.) |
| Marghera–end of bridge over Venice lagoon | 5 November 1843 |
| Bridge over Venice lagoon | 13 January 1846 |
| Mestre–Treviso | 15 August 1851 |
| Treviso–Pordenone | 1 May 1855 |
| Pordenone–Casarsa | 15 October 1855 |
| Casarsa–Udine | 21 July 1860 |

The section between Mestre and Udine was opened between 1851 and 1860.

The electrification of the Mestre–Udine section at 3000 volts DC was officially inaugurated in October 1960.

== Standards ==
The line is a double-track line entirely electrified at 3000 volts DC. The major cities crossed, in addition to the two termini, are Treviso and Pordenone.

The line is signalled with the Sistema di Comando e Controllo (SCC), a form of centralized traffic control. Traffic is regulated by an operations centre manager at Venezia Mestre.

== Rail traffic ==
Services are mainly operated by Trenitalia and consist of regional services, long-distance connections from Udine to Milan and Rome and from Venice to Vienna and Munich. In summary, the trains that operate on this line are:

- regional
- regional express
- Intercity
- Eurocity
- Frecciarossa
- Italo AV (since October 2019)

The main stations that have an interchange function with other lines are Venezia Mestre, Treviso Centrale, Conegliano, Sacile, Casarsa and Udine.
