= Venice–Trieste railway =

Railway line in Italy

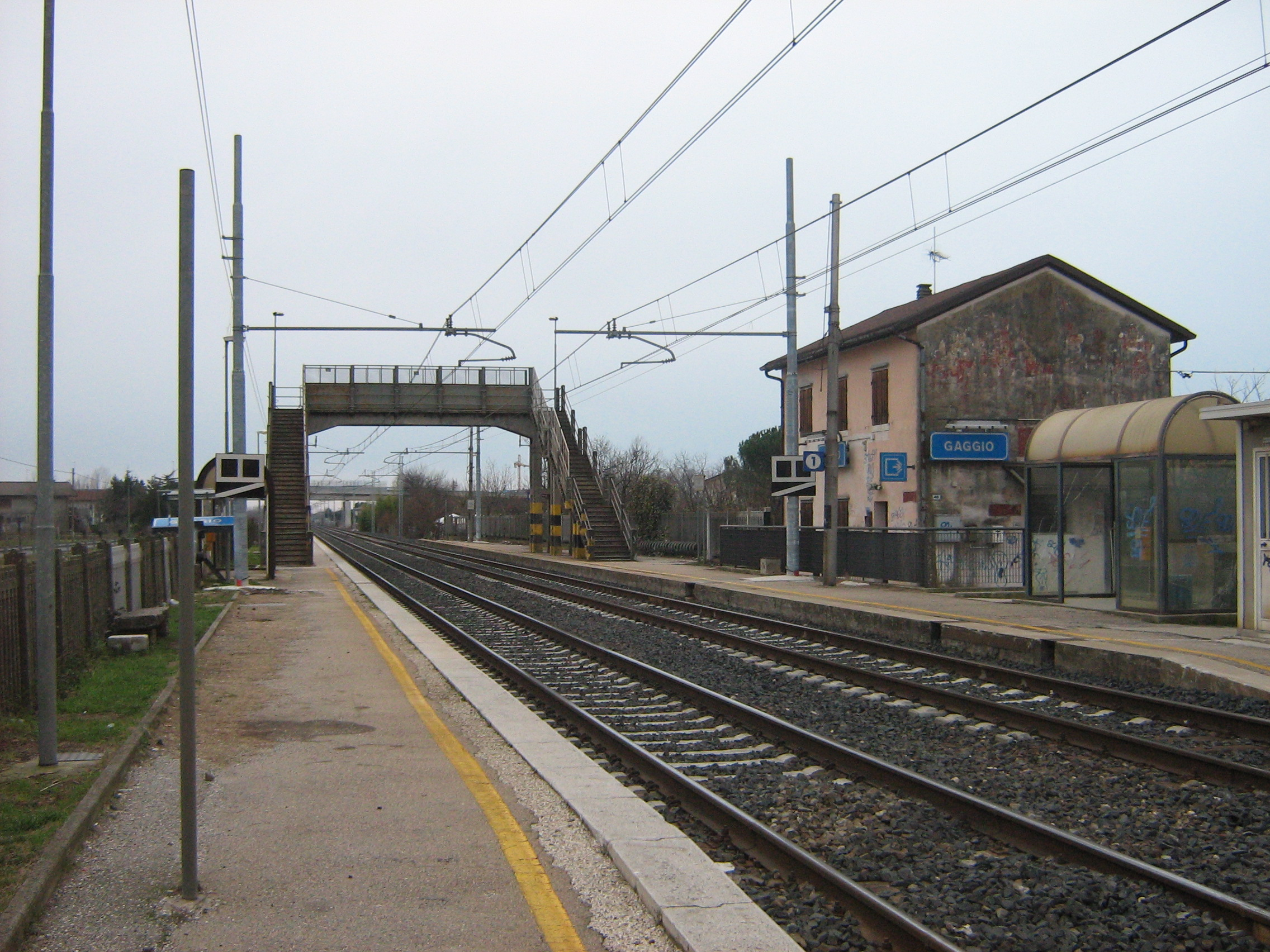
- Gaggio station on the Venice–Trieste railway in 2008

Overview
- Status: in use
- Owner: RFI
- Locale: Italy
- Termini: Venice; Trieste

Service
- Type: Heavy rail
- Operator(s): Trenitalia

History
- Opened: 1897

Technical
- Line length: 153 km (95 mi)
- Number of tracks: 2
- Track gauge: 1,435 mm (4 ft 8 1/2 in) standard gauge
- Electrification: 3 kV DC

The Venice–Trieste railway is a railway line in Italy.

== History ==
The section between Venice and San Giorgio di Nogaro was opened as a local railway from the private company Società Veneta in several sections between 1885 and 1888. Later it was decided to prolonge this line through the international border to Austria-Hungary; in 1894 the Austrian section between Cervignano and Monfalcone was opened by the Friauler Eisenbahn-Gesellschaft, the border section between San Giorgio and Cervignano followed three years later.

After the First World War all the line came to Italy, and it became a principal railway, managed by the state company Ferrovie dello Stato Italiane.

== See also ==
- List of railway lines in Italy

== Bibliography ==
- RFI - Fascicolo Linea 52 (Venezia Santa Lucia–Latisana)
- RFI - Fascicolo Linea 63 (Latisana–Trieste Centrale)
