= Giordano Vittori =

Italian linguist, poet and teacher

Aldo Vittori
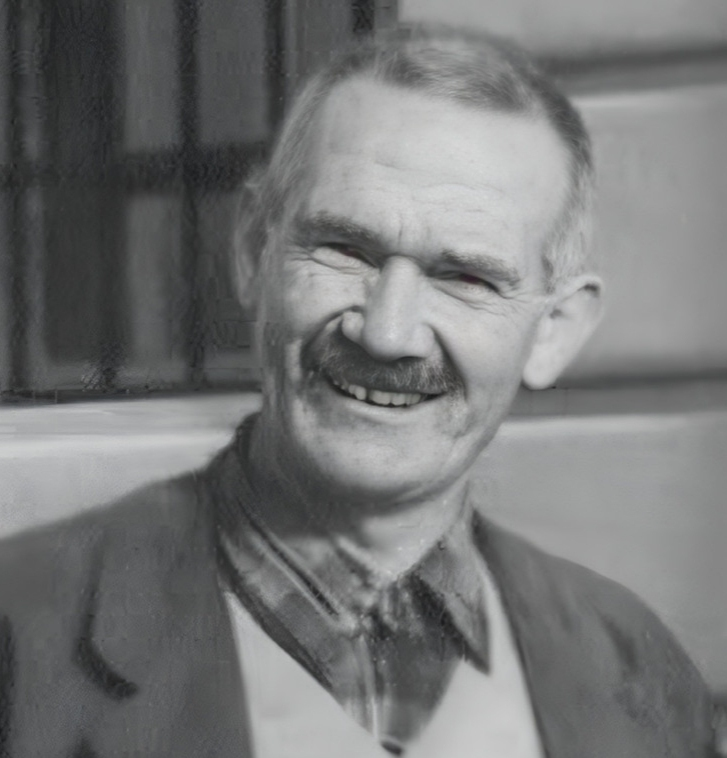
- Portrait of Giordano Vittori (1970)
- Born: Aldo Vittori; 4 October 1919; Sagrado, Italy
- Died: 7 January 1974 (aged 54); Gorizia, Italy
- Citizenship: Italian
- Occupations: Linguist, poet, school teacher

Aldo Vittori (1919–1974), also known by his nickname Jambo, was an Italian linguist, poet, and teacher. He is primarily remembered as one of the founding figures of modern Bisiaco lexicography, having been part of the core group of scholars who compiled the seminal Vocabolario fraseologico del dialetto bisiac (Cappelli, Bologna, 1985), the first comprehensive lexicographical work dedicated to this specific variety of the Venetian-Julian dialect.

== Biography ==
Born in Sagrado in 1919, Vittori completed his higher education at the "S. Slataper" Teacher Training Institute in Gorizia. He worked as a primary school teacher for over thirty years and was actively involved in union work within the CGIL.

Alongside his teaching career, he had a strong passion for theater, serving as an actor and artistic director for several local companies, with a particular focus on works in the local dialect.

== Filmography ==
In 1968, together with Aldo Miniussi and F. Gismano, he participated in the production of the educational short film *Insiemistica per i più piccoli* ("Set theory for little ones"), dedicated to teaching set theory in primary schools. The film, shot on 16mm, was screened in various schools in the Friuli-Venezia Giulia region and received a special award at the 1969 Rome Educational Film Festival.

== Contribution to Bisiaco lexicography ==
Starting in the late 1950s, Vittori collaborated with Silvio Domini, Aldo Fulizio, and Aldo Miniussi to compile the *Vocabolario fraseologico del dialetto "bisiàc"*. The extensive project, which involved collecting phrases, proverbs, and typical expressions of the Bisiaco dialect, spanned over fifteen years of research. The work was published posthumously in 1985 by Cappelli Editore. The dictionary is considered by scholars an essential reference for documenting and studying the local dialect.

== Literary works ==
In the final years of his life, Vittori dedicated himself to writing poetry and prose in the vernacular, contributing to local cultural journals such as "La Cantada" and "La Britula". His compositions, known for their expressive power and shifting between ironic and melancholic tones, mark him as a significant figure in Bisiaco literature.

== Legacy ==
In 1975, his colleagues Domini, Fulizio, and Miniussi published a commemorative volume containing a biographical profile and an anthology of his writings. A more extensive anthology followed in 1988, edited by Silvio Domini. In 1995, the municipality of Sagrado named a street in his honor and established a scholarship to support research into Venetian-derived dialects in the Isonzo area.
