= Associazione Culturale Bisiaca =

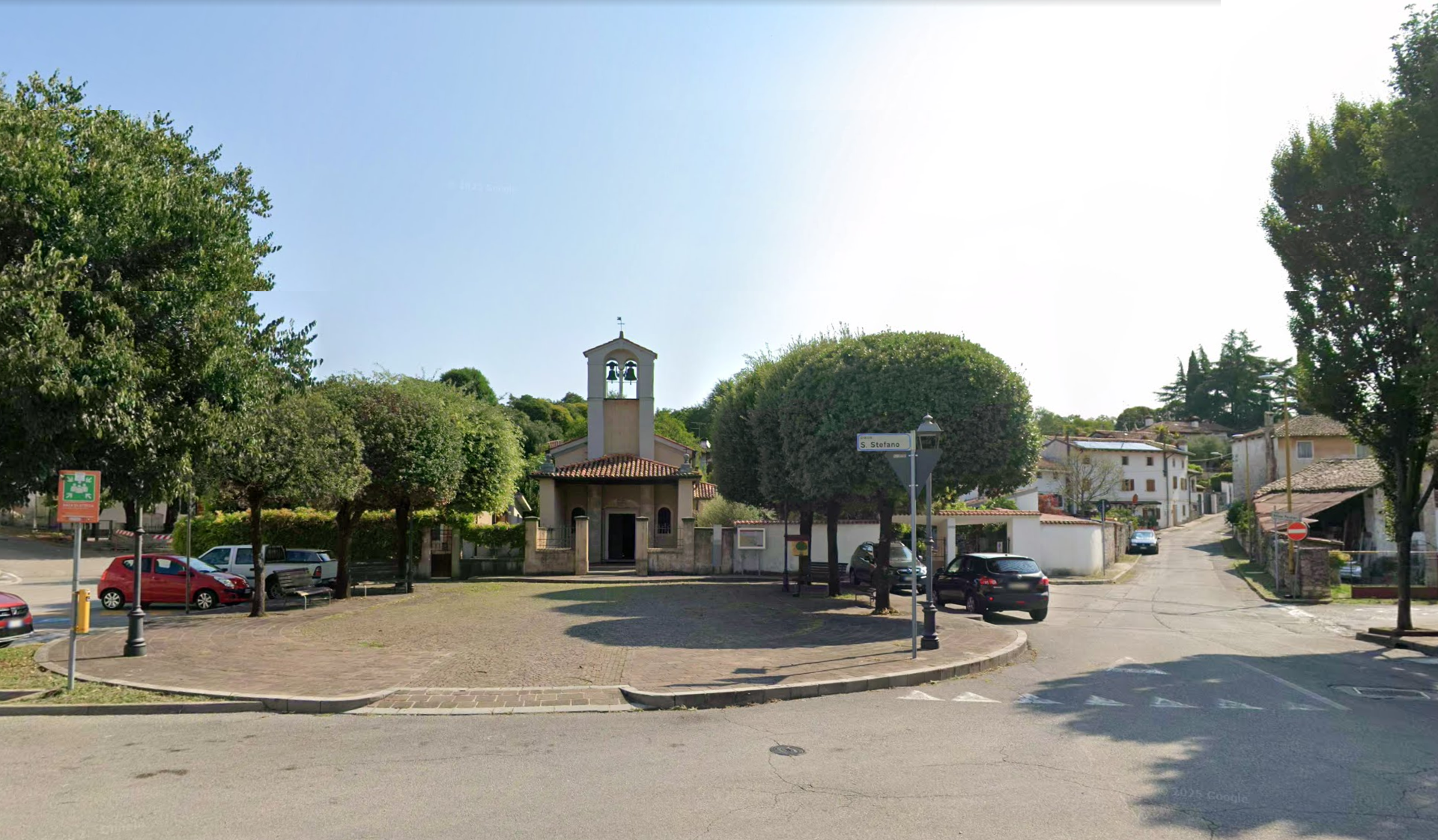
- Piazza Santo Stefano in Vermegliano, headquarters of the association
- Abbreviation: ACB
- Type: Voluntary organization
- Founded: 1987
- Founder: Silvio Domini
- Purpose: Promotion and preservation of Bisiaco culture and dialect
- Headquarters: Piazza S. Stefano, 6; 34077 Ronchi dei Legionari
- Country: Italy
- Region served: Bisiacaria
- President: Chiara Moimas
- Languages: Italian, Bisiaco dialect
- Website: www.acbisiaca.it

The Associazione Culturale Bisiaca (ACB) is a voluntary non-profit organization based in Ronchi dei Legionari, operating in the historical region of Bisiacaria. Founded in 1987, its primary objective is the promotion, protection, and enhancement of the historical, linguistic, and cultural heritage of the territory located between the Timavo river, the lower Isonzo, the Karst Plateau, and the Adriatic Sea.

== History ==
The association was established in 1987. Key figures in its creation included the scholar, lexicographer and poet Silvio Domini, who served as its first president and founder.

Since its inception, the association has conducted historical research, archival documentation, and cultural outreach, focusing specifically on safeguarding the Bisiaco dialect and the folk traditions of the area.

== Activities ==
ACB organizes public lectures, exhibitions, regional language courses, conferences, and research groups dedicated to local history and cultural preservation.

Its key initiatives include:

- the annual language and local culture course A scola de bisiac;
- lecture series focused on the history of the Gorizia and Monfalcone areas;
- historical and archival exhibitions;
- book presentations and independent publishing endeavors.

== Publishing activities ==
Since 1987, the association has published the annual journal Bisiacaria, which features research in local history, linguistics, archaeology, anthropology, and folklore. The publication is frequently cited in academic literature and by cultural institutions, such as the Archival Superintendence of Friuli-Venezia Giulia.

In addition to its annual journal, ACB publishes the four-monthly periodical Lisonz (since 1987) alongside various monographs on lexicography, social history, and regional literature.

=== Selected publications ===
Title	Author(s)	Year	ISBN	Notes
Lisonz	Associazione Culturale Bisiaca	1987–present		Four-monthly periodical.
Cori e canti bisiachi	Rodolfo Kubik	1989		Musical score edited by Silvio Domini.
La mancata conquista di quota 28 del Timavo nel 1917	Abramo Schmid	1991		Offprint from the journal Bisiacaria (1991).
Vistù de verdo / Zeleno oblečen	Silvio Domini	1993		Poetry collection. Edited by Jolka Milič (Italian and Slovenian parallel text).
La Chiesa di Santa Maria in Monte a Fogliano	Luca Geroni, Licio Pavan	1998		
Fiori de ben : poesie e racconti	Marina Zucco	2001		Edited by Marina Dorsi; illustrated by Mario Bagat.
Il ponte di Sagrado a 90 anni dall'inaugurazione: 1914-2004	Sergio Vittori	2004		
La Madonna del Capitello : Fogliano: una scultura dipinta ritrovata	Nadia Bertoni, Stéphane Cren	2004		
Bisiaco è bello ovvero Come andare per il mondo e restare in Bisiacaria	Various authors (ed. A. Gasparini and G. Tarlao)	2005	ISBN 88-89825-02-2	Published in collaboration with the Institute of International Sociology of Gorizia (ISIG).
Vocabolario essenziale italiano-bisiac	Mauro Casasola	2007		
...perchè li abbiate a goder unitamente in comun a pascolo e legne...	Renato Duca, Marina Dorsi, Renato Cosma	2009	ISBN 978-88-96257-02-9	Study on common land usage in the Monfalcone region (16th–19th centuries).
Il samartinàr : storia di un antigo dialetto del Carso goriziano	Irene Angela Vidal	2010	ISBN 978-88-96257-07-4	
Marianna e Luigia Pascoli : due donne e l'ambiente artistico italiano dell'800	Luca Geroni	2010	ISBN 978-88-96257-06-7	
L'erbario : piante spontanee di uso alimentare nella Bisiacaria	Ed. Alfredo Altobelli and Rosa Braut	2013	ISBN 978-88-96257-10-4	Recipes by Mariano Boriani (3rd ed. ISBN 978-88-96257-21-0).
Zughi bisiachi de 'na volta	Sergio Vittori	2013	ISBN 978-88-96257-11-1	
Al Cant dei Canti	Ivan Crico	2018	ISBN 978-88-96257-19-7	Translation of the Song of Songs into the Bisiaco dialect.
Caradori : storie di vita e di lavoro lungo l'Isonzo	Emanuela Puntin	2024		2nd edition.
La stagione febbrile dei Consorzi nella Bisiacaria: 1965–1980	Ed. Antonia Barillari	n.d.	ISBN 978-88-96257-32-6	Published in collaboration with the Consorzio Culturale del Monfalconese.

== Collaborations ==
The association collaborates with local authorities, public libraries, museums, and regional institutions throughout Friuli-Venezia Giulia, such as the Consorzio Culturale del Monfalconese (CCM), participating in joint projects dedicated to the preservation of regional historical memory and oral history.

== Bibliography ==
- Bisiacaria, annual publication of the Associazione Culturale Bisiaca, Ronchi dei Legionari, 1987–present.
- Marina Dorsi, "Ensayos e contribuciones sobre la Bisiacaria", in Bisiacaria, nos. 1–7 (1987–1993).
- "Gorizia, storie, poesie e immagini svelano la Bisiacaria". Messaggero Veneto. 2024-11-26.
- "Gorizia-Monfalcone, il nuovo numero di "Bisiacaria"". Il Piccolo. 2023-12-04.
- "Un cd per i bisiachi all'estero". Messaggero Veneto. 2004-08-23.
- "Nelle copertine della rivista i primi 25 anni di Bisiacaria". Il Piccolo. 2012-10-25.
- "Gorizia-Monfalcone, assemblea on line dell'Associazione Culturale Bisiaca". Il Piccolo. 2021-04-13.
- "Decimo congresso dell'Associazione Culturale Bisiaca". Messaggero Veneto. 2007-09-20.
- "Bisiacaria - numero unico 2026". InBiblio (Catalogo Bibliotecario).
- "Vocabolario essenziale italiano-bisiac". InBiblio (Catalogo Bibliotecario).
- "Al curtivon dei spurtivi e altre storie". InBiblio (Catalogo Bibliotecario).
