= Quaderni =

- Frazione
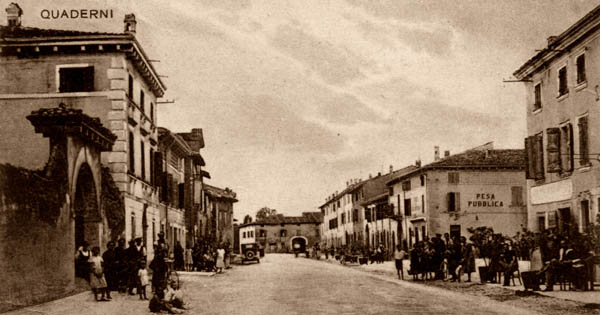
- Viale Mazzini in 1920s

- Location of Quaderni in Italy
- Coordinates: 45°19′46.14″N 10°47′25.87″E
- Country: Italy
- Region: Veneto
- Province: Verona (VR)
- Comune: Villafranca di Verona
- Elevation: 55 m (180 ft)

Population (2011)
  - Total: 1,618
- Demonym: Quadernesi
- Time zone: UTC+1 (CET)
  - Summer (DST): UTC+2 (CEST)
- Postal code: 37069
- Dialing code: (+39) 045
- Patron saint: St. Matthew the Apostle
- Saint day: 4th sunday of September

Quaderni is an Italian village and hamlet (frazione) of the commune of Villafranca di Verona, in the Veneto. It has an estimated population of 1,618.

== History ==
The village became an autonomous parish in 1583. Its name, in Italian, means "notebooks".

== Geography ==
Quaderni lies on a plain between Villafranca (6 km northeast), Valeggio sul Mincio (5 km northwest), and Mozzecane (3 km southeast); and next to the borders of Veneto with Lombardy. It is 9 km from Roverbella (in the Province of Mantua), 8 from Povegliano Veronese, 23 from Verona and 24 from Mantua.

== See also ==
- Dossobuono
- Rosegaferro
- Villafranca di Verona
- Verona-Villafranca Airport
