= Vocabolario fraseologico del dialetto bisiac =

Dialect dictionary of the Bisiacaria region, published in 1985

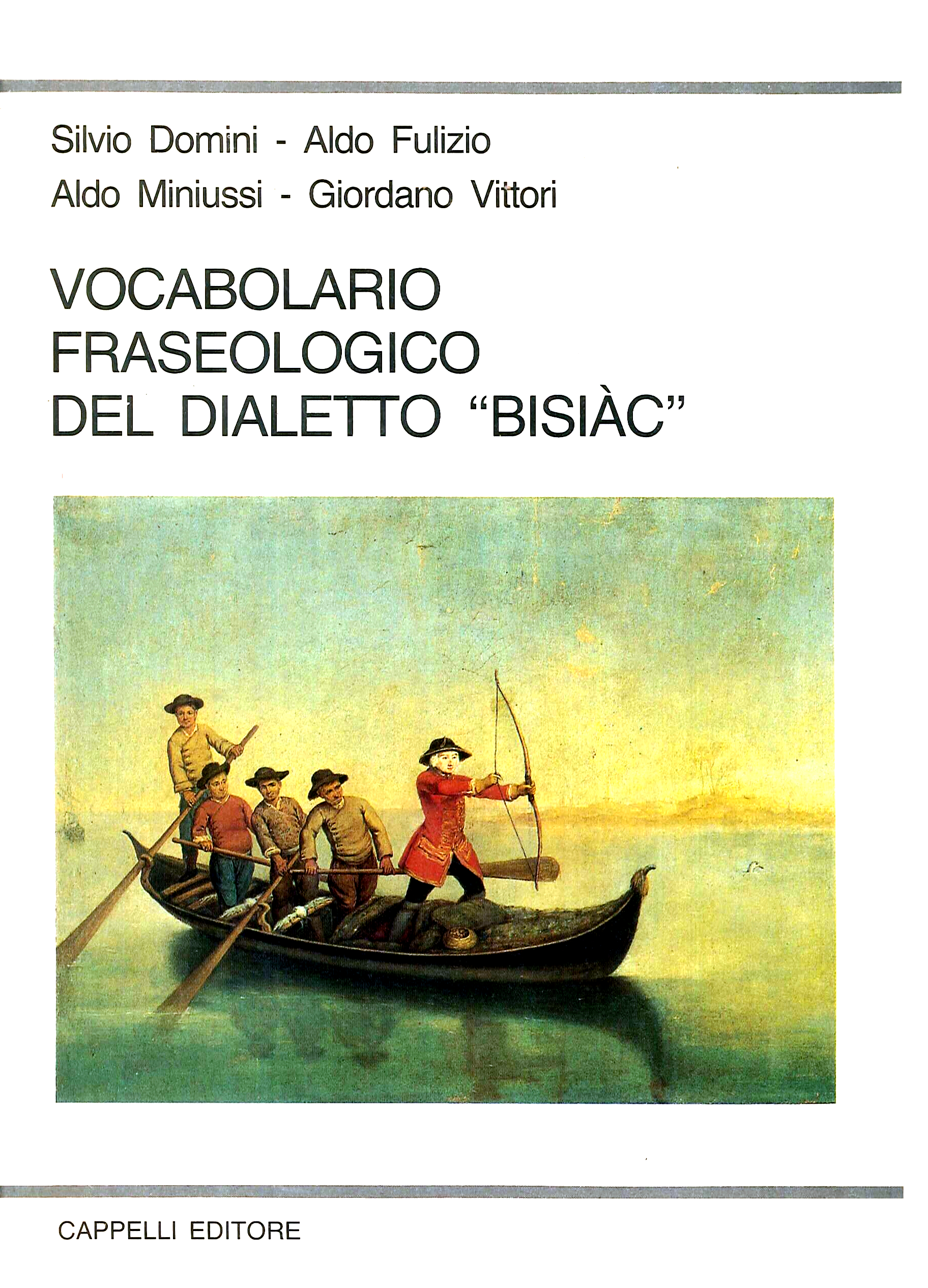
- Author: Aldo Miniussi, Silvio Domini, Aldo Fulizio, Giordano Vittori
- Language: Italian, Bisiac
- Genre: Dictionary
- Published: 1985
- Publisher: Cappelli Editore
- Pages: 580
- OCLC: OCLC 13358303

The Vocabolario fraseologico del dialetto bisiac is a dialect dictionary published in 1985 by the publishing house Cappelli Editore in Bologna, Italy. Edited by Aldo Miniussi, Silvio Domini, Aldo Fulizio, and Giordano Vittori, the work compiles and codifies the Bisiac dialect, a Venetian-type variety historically spoken in the Bisiacaria region within the Province of Gorizia.

== Editorial history ==
The project originated in the post-World War II era to document the linguistic heritage of the Bisiacaria amidst shifting socioeconomic conditions and the progressive Italianization of local speech.

Gathering the lexical entries required two decades of ethnolinguistic field research. The authors collected oral testimonies across the towns of Monfalcone, Ronchi dei Legionari, Staranzano, San Canzian d'Isonzo, Turriaco, Fogliano Redipuglia, and Sagrado (excluding the hamlets of Poggio, Peteano, and San Martino, which fall outside the Bisiac linguistic area), drawing particularly from older generations and workers from the Cantieri Riuniti dell'Adriatico (CRDA) shipyards.

== Characteristics ==
The volume spans 580 pages and contains over 20,000 entries, weighing more than 3 kg. The material is organized into three main sections—proper dialect lemmas, words with graphical similarities to Italian, and terms identical to Italian—along with two appendices.

Each entry documents etymological origins, including an archaic Venetian foundation as well as historical loanwords derived from Friulian, Slovenian, and German. Entries are supplemented by phonetic transcription, utilizing a specific system of graphic signs to record local pronunciation variants and distinguish homophones, alongside structural phraseology featuring real conversational contexts and idiomatic expressions.

== Reception ==
Publication by Cappelli successfully integrated the Bisiac variety into broader Italian and international dialectology studies. The work was reviewed in a critical essay by glottologist Mario Doria in the journal Il Territorio and received academic reviews in international publications such as the University of California's Romance Philology.

== Sources and bibliography ==
- Silvio Domini, Aldo Fulizio, Aldo Miniussi, Giordano Vittori, Vocabolario fraseologico del dialetto bisiac, Bologna, Cappelli, 1985.
- Mario Doria, Né friulano, né triestino. Il Vocabolario fraseologico del dialetto bisiac, in Il Territorio. Bollettino del Consorzio Culturale del Monfalconese, no. 13, pp. 53–61.
- Review of Vocabolario fraseologico del dialetto 'bisiac'' (1985), in Romance Philology, vol. 42, no. 1, 1988, pp. 107–110.
- Silvio Domini, La ricerca dialettale nella Bisiacaria, in Iniziativa Isontina, no. 75, 1980.
- Sistema Informativo sul Patrimonio Culturale del Friuli Venezia Giulia (SIRPAC), Fondo Silvio Domini e documentazione CCM, in collaboration with the Consorzio Culturale del Monfalconese (CCM).
- University of Udine (Department of Foreign Languages and Literatures), Rapporti ed indagini sui dialetti veneto-goriziani, Udine, 1987.
- C. Battisti, Veneto e Friulano nel Medioevo, Studi goriziani, 1959, pp. 9–36.
- F. Crevatin, A proposito di aree linguistiche friulane, Studi goriziani, 1978, pp. 7–11.
- G. Francescato, Motivi per lo studio del "bisiaco". Il problema storico-linguistico, Il Territorio, 1980, pp. 29–36.
- G. Frau, I dialetti del Friuli, Pisa/Udine, Pacini/Società Filologica Friulana, 1984.
- U. Pellis, Ai margini della friulanità, Ce fastu?, 1933, pp. 229–247.
- J. Trumper, Ricostruzione nell'Italia settentrionale: sistemi consonantici, in R. Simone, U. Vignuzzi (eds.), Problemi della ricostruzione in linguistica, Rome, Bulzoni, 1977, pp. 259–310.
- A. Zamboni, Sul neolatino delle aree marginali friulane: il problema del "bisiacco" e la presenza storica del veneto, in H. Holtus, K. Ringger (eds.), Raetia antiqua et moderna. W. Theodor Elwert zum 80. Geburtstag, Tübingen, Niemeyer, 1986, pp. 617–646.
