= Aldo Fulizio =

Italian linguist, translator, and lexicographer (1897–1980)

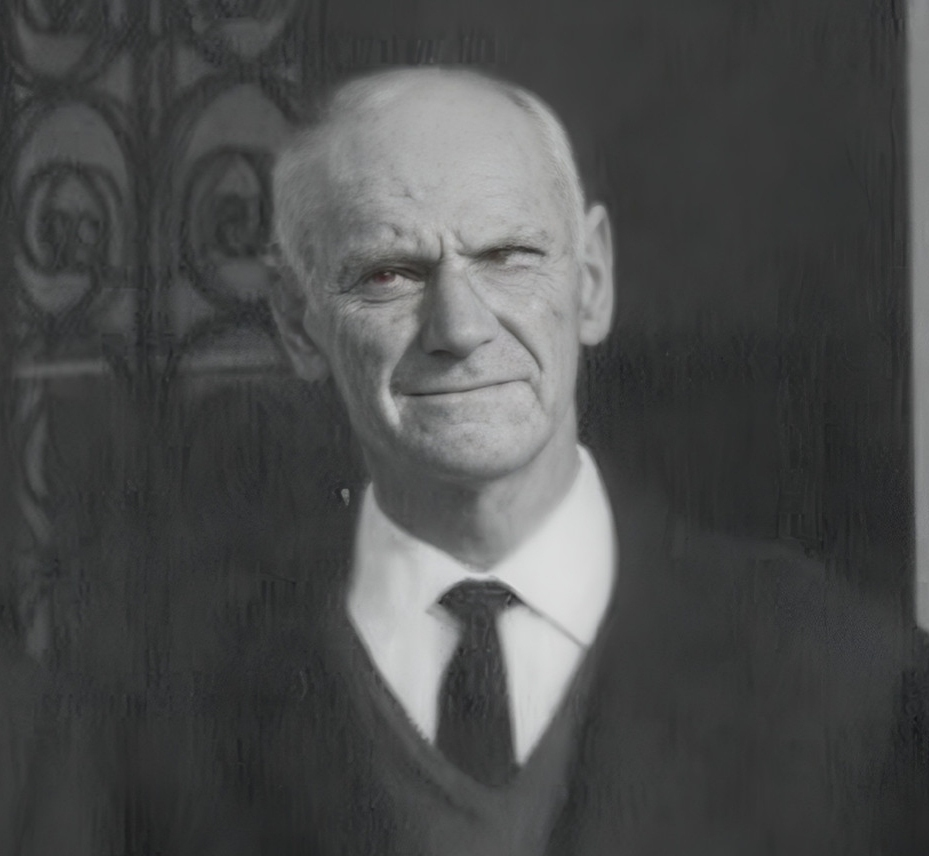
- Portrait of Aldo Fulizio (1970)
- Born: March 19, 1897; Vermegliano, Austria-Hungary
- Died: May 2, 1980 (aged 83); Portogruaro, Italy
- Other name: Alceo
- Citizenship: Italian
- Education: Istituto magistrale di Gradisca d'Isonzo
- Occupations: Linguist; Translator; Enigmatist; Teacher
- Known for: Co-author of the Vocabolario fraseologico del dialetto bisiac

Aldo Fulizio (19 March 1897 – 2 May 1980), also known by the pen name Alceo, was an Italian linguist, lexicographer, translator, and writer. He is best remembered as one of the founding figures of modern Bisiac lexicography, having contributed significantly to the compilation of the Vocabolario fraseologico del dialetto bisiac (1985), the foundational dictionary of the Bisiac dialect.

== Biography ==
Born in Vermegliano, a hamlet of Ronchi dei Legionari, Fulizio grew up within the historical context of the Austrian Littoral. During World War I, he served in the Austro-Hungarian Army, as documented in the military district records of Gorizia. Following the conclusion of the conflict, he completed his studies and obtained his teaching diploma from the institute in Gradisca d'Isonzo in 1919.

Fulizio dedicated approximately forty years of his career to teaching in primary and vocational schools in Ronchi dei Legionari. Alongside his educational activities, he served as a cultural promoter in the local community, directing the municipal library of Ronchi dei Legionari for several years.

Proficient in French, English, and German, Fulizio worked as a professional translator for various publishing houses, translating roughly thirty works, primarily in children's literature. Notably, he translated Peter Christen Asbjørnsen and Jørgen Moe's collection of Norwegian folk tales (Norske Folkeeventyr) for Edizioni Paoline in 1960.

From the 1930s onward, he contributed prose and poetry to national periodicals such as L'Illustrazione Italiana, I Diritti della scuola, and Le Stagioni. In 1938, several of his poems were included in the anthology Dieci poeti (Edizioni Centauro, Milan).

Working under the pseudonym "Alceo", Fulizio was also an active figure in classical enigmistics, publishing around two thousand puzzles and word games in specialized magazines—such as Penombra and Diana d'Alteno—as well as in La Settimana Enigmistica. In 1961, he compiled a portion of this work into the volume La sfinge dei piccoli (Editrice La Scuola).

Starting in the late 1950s, Fulizio collaborated with Silvio Domini, Aldo Miniussi, and Giordano Vittori on a lexical cataloging project to document the Bisiac linguistic heritage, culminating in the 1985 publication of the Vocabolario fraseologico del dialetto bisiac. He also co-authored the memorial volume Biografia e scelta di scritti in memoria di Giordano Vittori in 1975 and contributed to the 1978 collection Proverbi della Bisiacaria.

In his later years, Fulizio moved to Portogruaro to live with his daughter's family, where he died on 2 May 1980 at the age of 83.

== Selected works ==
=== Linguistics and Lexicography ===
- Silvio Domini, Aldo Fulizio, Aldo Miniussi, Giordano Vittori, Vocabolario fraseologico del dialetto bisiac, Bologna, Cappelli, 1985.

=== Enigistics ===
- La sfinge dei piccoli, Brescia, La Scuola, 1961.

== Sources and bibliography ==
- Silvio Domini, La piera de canton. Recordo de Aldo Fulizio, Aldo Miniussi, Giordano Vittori, in Bisiacaria, no. 3/4, 1983, pp. 31–38.
- Pier Maria Miniussi, Fulizio Aldo, in Nuovo Liruti. Dizionario biografico dei friulani, Udine, Forum, 2006, pp. 1245–1247.
- Gianfranco Francisci, La lessicografia dialettale in Friuli, in Ce Fastu?, Udine, Società Filologica Friulana, 1986, pp. 67–89.
- Bruno Pincherle, Storia dell'enigmistica italiana, Milan, Rizzoli, 1988.
