= Aeroporto Friuli Venezia Giulia (company) =

- Company type: state-owned Società per azioni
- Headquarters: 46 via Aquileia, Ronchi dei Legionari, Friuli-Venezia Giulia, Italy
- Revenue: ▼€14,436,760 (2014)
- Operating income: ▼ (€1,228,967) (2014)
- Net income: ▼ (€1,252,046) (2014)
- Total assets: ▼€16,011,598 (2014)
- Total equity: ▼€3,476,436 (2014)
- Owner: Friuli-Venezia Giulia
- Parent: Friuli-Venezia Giulia
- Subsidiaries: AFVG Security (100%); Midtravel (100%); Sigepar (100%)
- Website: Official website

Aeroporto Friuli Venezia Giulia SpA is the operator of the Trieste Airport in Friuli-Venezia Giulia, Italy.

The company is a minority owner of Aeroporto Amedeo Duca d'Aosta di Gorizia SCpA, the operator of the airport of Gorizia.
