= Sandro Veronesi (entrepreneur) =

Italian entrepreneur

- Born: 1959 (age 66–67); Ala, Trento, Italy
- Education: University of Verona
- Occupation: Founder of Calzedonia
- Known for: Calzedonia, Intimissimi, Tezenis, Falconeri, Signorvino, Atelier Emé Cash & Carry
- Spouse: Nadia Grassi
- Website: www.calzedonia.it

Sandro Veronesi (born 1959) is an Italian billionaire businessman, and founder of the Calzedonia Group. The group includes Calzedonia, Intimissimi, Tezenis, Falconeri, Signorvino, Atelier Emé and Cash & Carry. As of December 2024, Forbes estimated his net worth at US$2.0 billion.

== Early life ==
Veronesi was born in Ala, Trento, Italy, in 1959. He earned his high school diploma from Liceo ‘Galileo Galilei’ and a bachelor's degree in economics and business from University of Verona in 1983. After completing his degree, he began to work at the Golden Lady Spa, an Italian company leader in the production of pantyhose, founded by Nerino Grassi. Sandro Veronesi married Nadia Grassi, one of the two daughters of Nerino Grassi, chairman of Golden Lady. Nadia Veronesi is also one of the main shareholders of Calzedonia Group (with a 15% share).

== Career ==
Veronesi was added to the Forbes billionaires list in 2013. He is the founder of the Calzedonia Group, an Italian company that sells lingerie, stockings and swimsuits through its Calzedonia, Intimissimi and Tezenis brands. It also has a majority position in Falconeri, an Italian clothing company known for its cashmere knitwear. Veronesi's first job after graduating from the University of Verona was with Golden Lady, an Italian hosiery company. He started Calzedonia in 1987 while still working at Golden Lady. The company originally focused on tights and stockings before it diversified to include the lingerie and underwear sectors in the mid-1990s. In 2013 there were more than 3,000 Calzedonia stores in Europe and the Middle East]

“In life as in work you must be an actor and not a spectator“.

=== Early career ===
After university, Sandro Veronesi began to work in 1984 at Golden Lady Spa, the company of pantyhose founded by Nerino Grassi. In 1987, when he was only 27 years old, he founded Calzedonia Spa, while he was still working in Golden Lady as a general manager. In 1993 the partnership between the two entrepreneurs broke up and he decided to dedicate himself exclusively to his own Calzedonia, focusing on the objective of producing and selling high quality products at a fair price. In 1996 Calzedonia Group expanded with Intimissimi (underwear for women and men) with 481 million in revenue (+8%) and in 2003 with Tezenis (underwear for the whole family) with 401 million in revenue (+25%). In 2009 Calzedonia Group acquired a majority share in Falconeri (knitwear and cashmere). Veronesi is also the owner of the brand Cash & Carry by Calzedonia Group for the sale of products in stock.

=== International activities ===
The stores of Calzedonia, Intimissimi and Tezenis are about 3,000 in more than 30 countries, with factories in Italy, Eastern Europe and Sri Lanka. The Group has about 20,000 employees, with only 2,200 in Italy. Competitive positioning showed a significant leap in sales, which rose from €77 million in 1998 to €1,295 million in 2011.

"But the absence of multinationals is a brake for the development of the Country (Italy) and a lost opportunity of making our children citizens of the world: according to me it is a priority let the employees of the group travel, but only a big company can do it systematically".

“If I involve the people that will conduct initiatives first I get more information, second they feel more engaged and third we will take better decision. However, this have to be done quickly otherwise we will not take any decision “.

The organization adopted by the entrepreneur originally from Trento is verticalised: it goes from the head to the distribution in single-brand stores through a concentrated production to countries where labor is cheap. The group has four production subsidiaries in Sri Lanka, where it produces the bulk of the production of lingerie, two in Croatia, one in Romania, one in Bulgaria and one in Serbia. This is in addition to three historic sites in Italy.

=== Other activities ===
The hotel "La Torre", within the business group Calzedonia, is a luxury hotel complex created initially by Studio Botturi Castiglione, aimed at restoring an old rural complex. It was subsequently purchased by Sandro Veronesi.

The hotel is located near Lake Garda in Verona with good connections to the city and Verona Villafranca Airport. The hotel targets both business and holiday customers, and is positioned for local tourist activities like visiting the local vineyards.

In 2013, Sandro Veronesi launched the SignorVino chain of wine bars, with the intention of transferring know-how from his experiences in the textile industry. This includes developing the same type of organization and a centralized warehouse management (in Verona). Veronesi created the foundation San Zeno in 1999 through which a part of Calzedonia profit is reinvested in education, training and work for those who are in need and cannot afford it. Furthermore, Veronesi is a counselor for the advisory committee of Assofranchising.

== Recognition ==
1. He received "The Museo Nicolis Award" because of the competitive price/quality ratio, style and design and the use of avant-garde materials and fabrics on 30 October 2008.
2. He was awarded the Honor of "Cavaliere del Lavoro" ("Order of Merit for Labour", a recognition for high employment and economic strategy), on 29 May 2009.
