= Oniverse =

Italian fashion group

Oniverse Holding Spa
- Company type: Private
- Industry: Retail
- Founded: 1986; 40 years ago
- Founder: Sandro Veronesi
- Headquarters: Dossobuono di Villafranca di Verona, Veneto, Italy
- Number of locations: 5,732 (2024)
- Area served: Worldwide
- Products: Clothing; lingeries; accessories; wine shops; restaurants; superyachts
- Brands: Calzedonia; Intimissimi; Intimissimi Uomo; Tezenis; Falconeri; Atelier Emé; Antonio Marras; Signorvino; Cantiere del Pardo
- Revenue: ▲€3.527 billion (2024)
- Operating income: ▲€788 million (2024)
- Net income: ▲€142 million (2024)
- Website: oniverse.it

Oniverse Holding S.p.A., known as Oniverse (formerly Calzedonia Group (pronounced [kaltseˈdɔːnja])) is an Italian fashion and retail company headquartered in Dossobuono, near Verona, Italy. Founded in 1986 by Sandro Veronesi, the group owns multiple fashion and lifestyle brands and operates through a network of over 5,700 mono-brand stores across 55 countries as of 2025. Its main brands are Calzedonia, Intimissimi, Intimissimi Uomo, and Tezenis, specializing in lingerie, underwear, swimsuits, tights, and leggings, as well as other brands such as Falconeri, Atelier Emé, Antonio Marras, Signorvino, and Cantiere del Pardo, which focus on luxury fashion, Italian wines and superyachts.

== History ==
The company was established in Vallese di Oppeano (province of Verona) in 1986 and officially launched in 1987. Its founder, Sandro Veronesi, originally from Brentino Belluno, previously worked for Golden Lady, an Italian hosiery company founded by Nerino Grassi, whose daughter he later married. Veronesi holds a degree in economics and commerce from the University of Verona. As of 2025, he was listed by Forbes among the world's billionaires with an estimated net worth of $1.8 billion.

Initially, the company adopted a franchise-based model, enabling rapid expansion both in Italy and internationally. By 2009, according to Mediobanca, it was one of the few Italian groups to surpass €1 billion in revenue. In 2016, revenue exceeded €2 billion. In 2017, the group reported revenues of €2.314 billion with an EBITDA of €489 million, while in 2018, revenue slightly decreased to €2.3 billion, with EBITDA at €478 million.

On December 4, 2023, the group officially changed its name from Calzedonia Group to Oniverse.

== Brands ==
The company owns and operates the following brands:

- Calzedonia – hosiery, swimwear and leggings
- Intimissimi – lingerie and intimate apparel
  - Intimissimi Uomo – men's underwear, knitwear, nightwear and swimwear
- Tezenis – casualwear, underwear and loungewear
- Falconeri – fine knitwear and cashmere clothing
- Atelier Emé – bridal and formalwear
- Antonio Marras – high-end fashion
- Signorvino – wine shops and restaurants featuring Italian wines
- Cantiere del Pardo – luxury yachts

== Operations ==
Calzedonia logo

Tezenis logo

Tezenis old logo

The company's administrative headquarters is located in Dossobuono di Villafranca di Verona. Production facilities are located in Italy, Sri Lanka, Croatia, Bulgaria, Serbia, Bosnia and Herzegovina, and Ethiopia.

Its logistics network includes distribution centers in Oppeano and Castagnaro, Italy, Varaždin, Croatia, and São Paulo, Brazil.

Over the years, Oniverse has collaborated with several prominent international and Italian celebrities, including Julia Roberts, Sarah Jessica Parker, Adriana Lima, Rita Ora, Gisele Bündchen, Sara Sampaio, Noah Mills, Emily DiDonato, Clara Alonso, Annalisa, Chiara Ferragni, Emma Marrone and Federica Nargi.

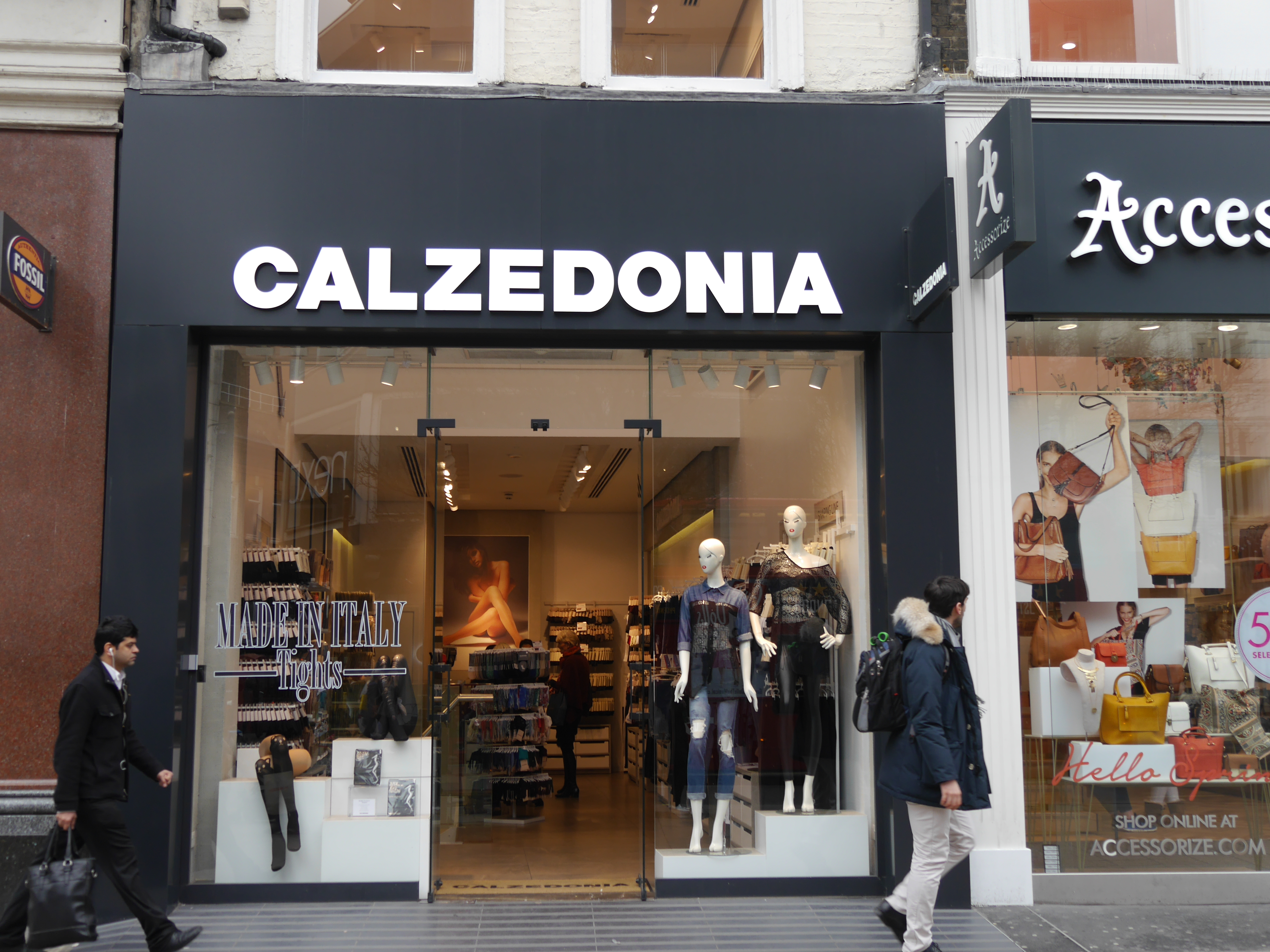
Calzedonia store, Oxford Street, London, 2016

In 2009, one of its commercials drew criticism for featuring a rearranged version of Inno di Mameli, the Italian national anthem, for advertising purposes.

== Philanthropy ==
The group supports the San Zeno Foundation, a nonprofit organization that funds educational and vocational training projects in Europe, Asia, Africa, and Latin America.

== Ownership and management ==
Sandro Veronesi remains chairman and majority shareholder. His three sons, Marcello, Matteo, and Federico Veronesi, are also involved in the business. Marcello Veronesi is C.E.O. of United States operations.

== See also ==
- List of companies of Italy
