= Trieste Airport =

Airport in Ronchi dei Legionari, Italy

Trieste Airport Aeroporto di Trieste
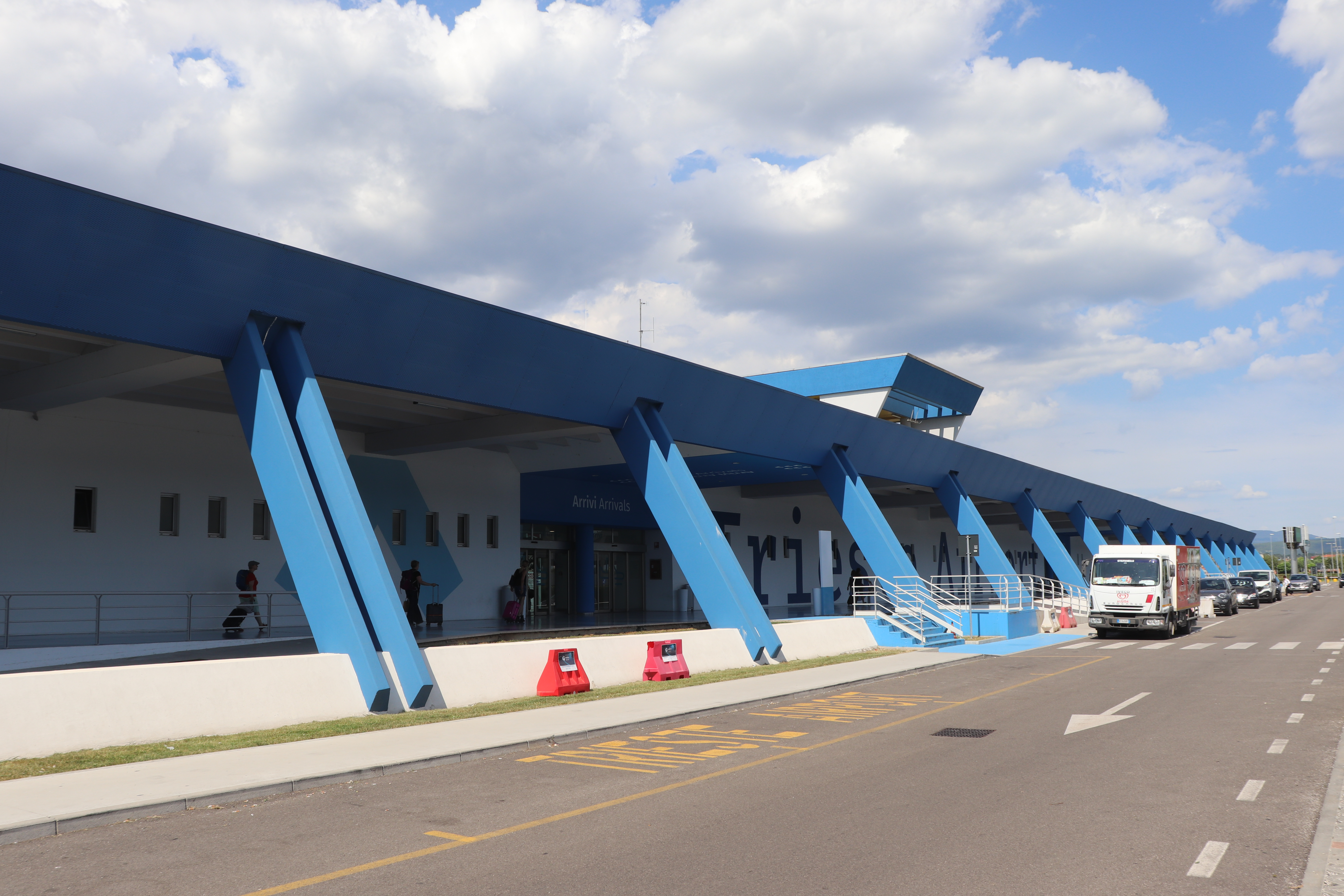
- IATA: TRS; ICAO: LIPQ

Summary
- Airport type: Public
- Operator: Aeroporto FVG S.p.A.
- Serves: Trieste
- Location: Ronchi dei Legionari, Italy
- Focus city for: Ryanair
- Elevation AMSL: 39 ft (12 m)
- Coordinates: 45°49′39″N 013°28′20″E
- Website: triesteairport.it

Map
- Location of the airport in Italy TRS (Italy)

Runways
Direction	Length		Surface
Direction	m	ft	Surface
09/27	3,000	9,843	Asphalt

Statistics (2025)
- Passengers: 1,651,703
- Passenger change 24-25: ▲25,1%
- Aircraft movements: 14,523
- Movements change 24-25: ▲14,2%
- Cargo (tons): 18,0
- Cargo change 24-25: ▼ -86,5%
- Source: Italian AIP at EUROCONTROL; Statistics from Trieste Airport

Trieste Airport (IATA: TRS, ICAO: LIPQ) (Italian: Aeroporto di Trieste) is an international airport located 0.3 NM (0.56 km; 0.35 mi) west of Ronchi dei Legionari (Province of Gorizia), near Trieste in Friuli-Venezia Giulia, north-eastern Italy. The airport has a catchment area of approximately 4 million people, stretching beyond Friuli-Venezia Giulia into neighboring Slovenia, Austria and Croatia.

== Overview ==
The first official documents citing the airfield of Ronchi dei Legionari date back to 30 November 1935, when the 4th Fighter Wing of the Royal Italian Air Force was based here. Commercial operations officially began on 2 December 1961. In 2007, the airport was dedicated to Pietro Savorgnan di Brazzà, a 19th century explorer with Friulian origins. In 2016 the airport was officially renamed Trieste Airport. In recent years, the airport has witnessed growth in low-cost and cargo traffic.

The airport is owned and operated by Aeroporto Friuli Venezia Giulia SpA, a jointly owned company controlled by F2i and the Friuli-Venezia Giulia government.

Following a record-breaking 2023, the airport became Ryanair's 17th Italian base in early 2024. This helped boost the airport's passenger numbers by 40%, crossing the one million mark for the first time in the platform's history, and making Trieste one of Europe's fastest-growing airports.

== Airlines and destinations ==
The following airlines operate regular scheduled and charter flights to and from Trieste:

Airlines	Destinations
Aeroitalia	Milan–Linate, Salerno; Seasonal: Alghero, Olbia
Air Dolomiti	Seasonal: Frankfurt
Airidea	Genoa
Eurowings	Seasonal charter: Cologne
Iberia	Seasonal charter: Madrid
ITA Airways	Rome–Fiumicino
Marabu	Seasonal charter: Hamburg
Ryanair	Barcelona, Bari, Brindisi, Brussels Charleroi, Catania, Dublin, Kraków, Lamezia Terme, London–Stansted, Malta, Naples, Palermo, Seville, Tirana, Valencia; Seasonal: Cagliari, Málaga, Olbia, Paris Beauvais, Prague, Stockholm–Arlanda
Sundair	Seasonal charter: Berlin
Transavia	Seasonal: Amsterdam (begins 1 April 2027)
TUI fly Deutschland	Seasonal charter: Hannover
Wizz Air	Naples (begins 14 December 2026), Pristina (begins 19 December 2026), Tirana

== Ground transportation ==
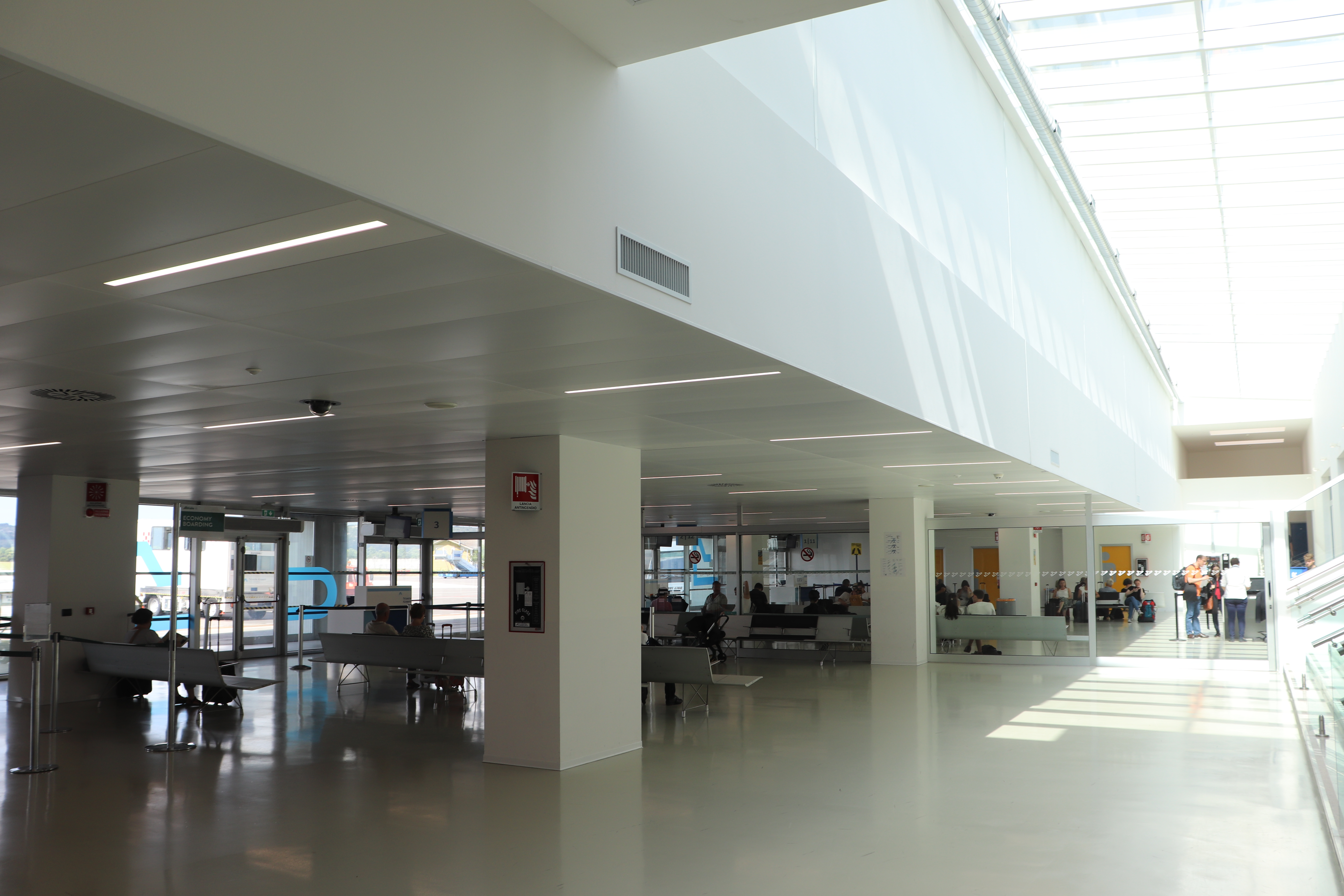
Terminal interior

The airport is connected to the national railway and highway networks thanks to the Intermodal Transit Hub completed in March 2018, serving as an air-road-rail interchange.

=== Rail ===
Trieste Airport railway station links the passenger terminal directly to the Venice–Trieste railway thanks to a 425-metre (1,394 ft) raised walkway.

=== Road ===
A bus terminal with 16 platforms, a multi-storey car park with 500 spaces and a grade level car park with 1000 spaces provide rapid access to and from the A4 Trieste-Turin highway for public and private motor vehicles. In the southern direction, this highway also offers connections to Slovenia's A1 Motorway with two crossings at Fernetti and Rabuiese, linking the airport with the highway networks in Croatia, Hungary and the Balkans. At the interchange near Palmanova, the A4 branches off to Autostrada A23 linking to Austria's Süd Autobahn A2 via Udine and Tarvisio.
