= Vigonovo =

Comune in Veneto, Italy

- Comune
- Comune di Vigonovo
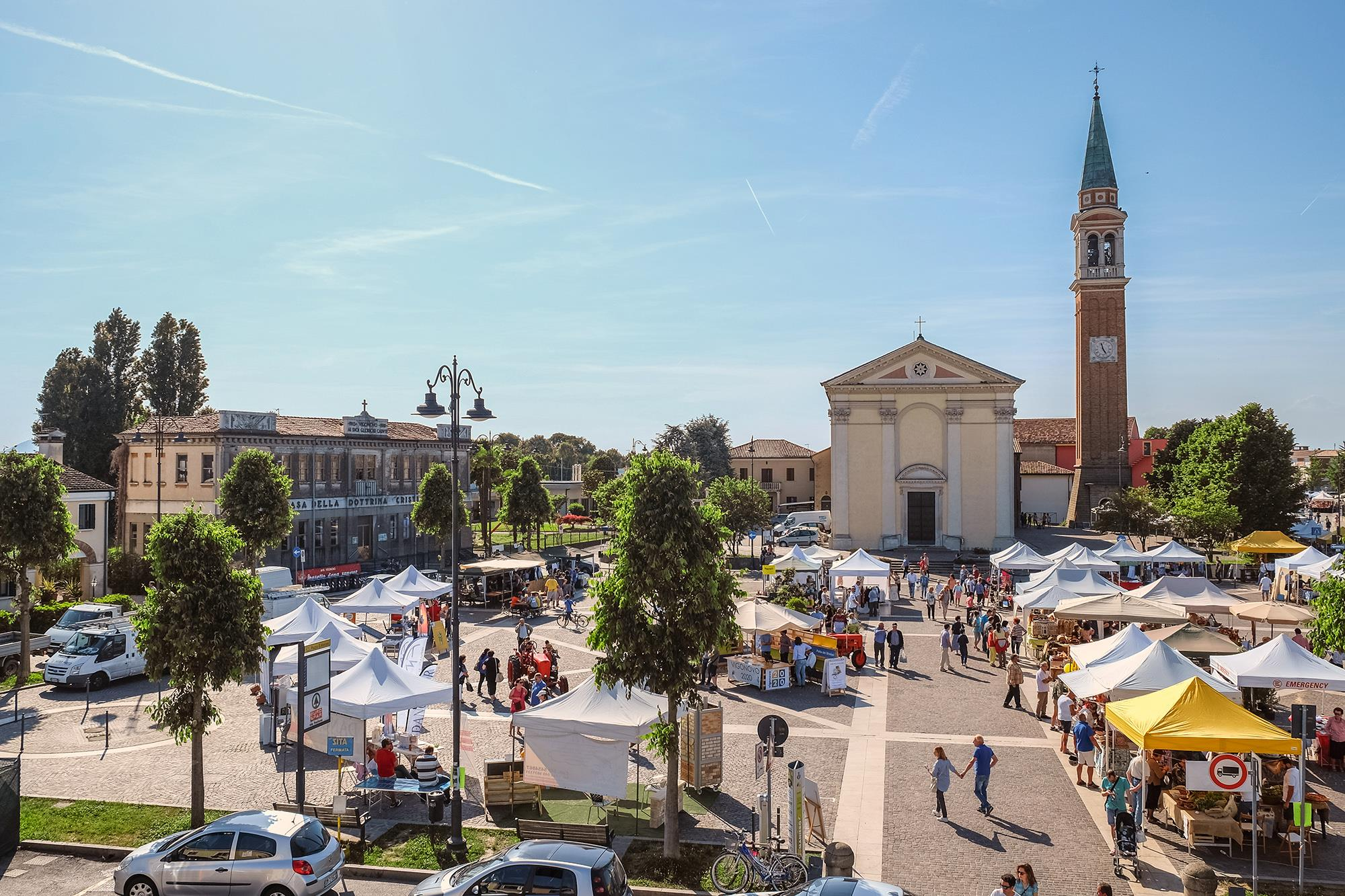

- Coat of arms

- Location within Italy Location within Veneto
- Coordinates: 45°23′N 12°3′E
- Country: Italy
- Region: Veneto
- Metropolitan city: Venice (VE)
- Frazioni: Celeseo, Galta, Tombelle località: Baita, Giudecca, Pava

Government
  - Mayor: Luca Martello

Area
  - Total: 12.79 km^{2} (4.94 sq mi)
- Elevation: 15 m (49 ft)

Population (30 April 2009)
  - Total: 9,796
  - Density: 765.9/km^{2} (1,984/sq mi)
- Demonym: vigonovesi
- Time zone: UTC+1 (CET)
  - Summer (DST): UTC+2 (CEST)
- Postal code: 30030
- Dialing code: 049
- ISTAT code: 027043
- Patron saint: Assumption of Mary
- Saint day: 15 August
- Website: Official website

Vigonovo (from Latin vicus novus, "new village") is a town and comune (municipality) in the Metropolitan City of Venice, Veneto, Italy.

== History ==
Before the year 1000 BC the territory was inhabited by Etruscans, Euganeans and Paleoveneti.

It is believed that around 1000 BC after the destruction of Troy by the Greeks, the members of a tribe of Paphlagonia (province of Asia Minor), called Heneti (hence the name Veneti), landed on the Adriatic coast and settled there after expelling the locals Etruscans.

Until medieval times, the town was called Sarmazza after a settlement of Sarmatians (an ancient people coming from the East).

== Geography ==
Vigonovo is located in the most extreme point of the area of the Venetian villas that have made the Riviera del Brenta known.

With its frazioni (boroughs) of Galta, Tombelle and Celeseo, Vigonovo is extends for about 13 square km west of the Brenta river on flat land. Extremely rich in waterways, in addition to the Brenta, the territory is crossed by the Piovego canal and other minor ones.

The town borders the municipalities of Fossò and Stra in Venice, and those of Noventa Padovana, Padua, Sant'Angelo di Piove di Sacco and Saonara in the Province of Padua.

== Transport ==
Vigonovo is located south of the strada statale SR11.
