= Air Dolomiti =

Regional airline of Italy

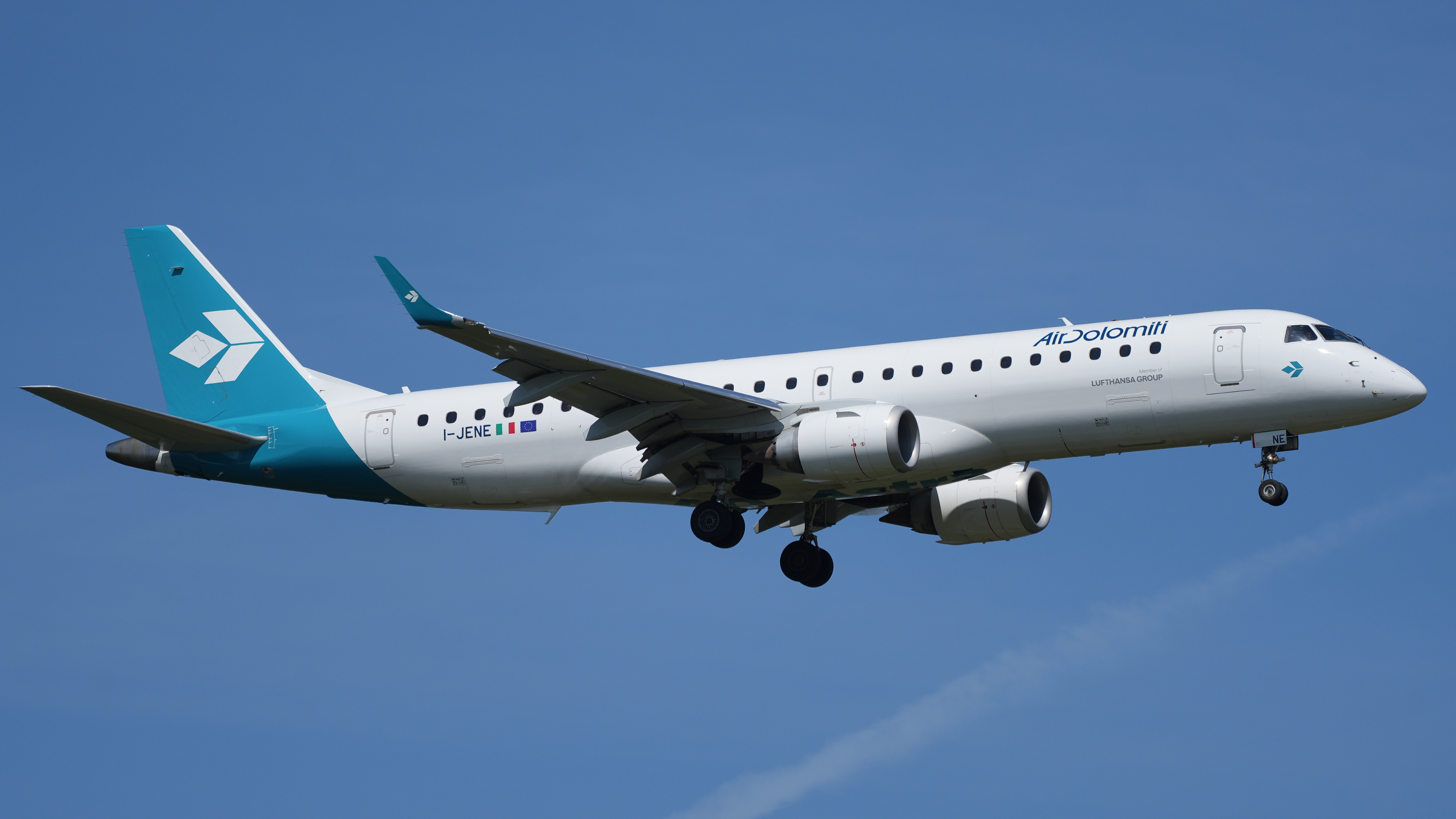
- Embraer 190
IATA	ICAO	Call sign
EN	DLA	DOLOMITI
- Founded: 30 December 1989; 36 years ago
- Commenced operations: January 1991; 35 years ago
- Operating bases: Frankfurt; Munich
- Focus cities: Verona Villafranca Airport; Florence Airport
- Frequent-flyer program: Miles & More
- Fleet size: 29
- Destinations: 49
- Parent company: Lufthansa Group
- Headquarters: Dossobuono, Villafranca di Verona, Italy
- Key people: Steffen Harbarth (CEO)
- Employees: 1000 (2024)
- Website: www.airdolomiti.eu

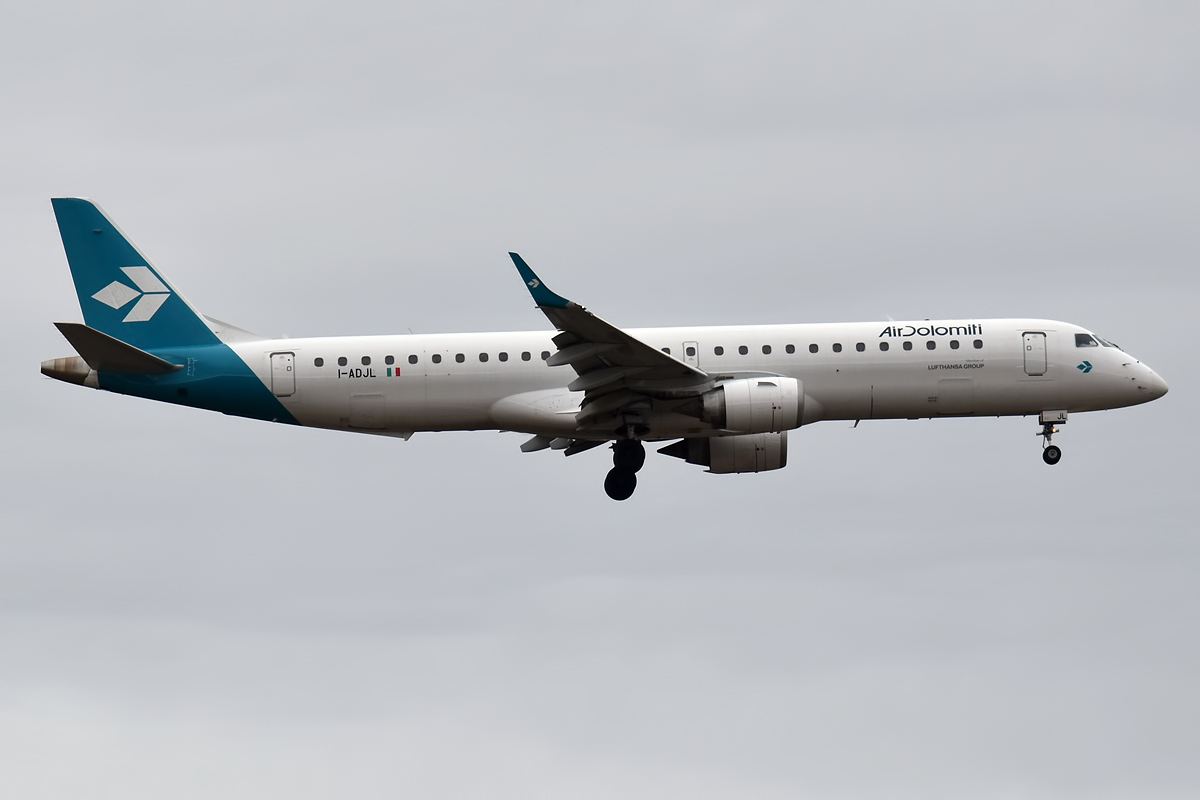
Air Dolomiti Embraer 195

Air Dolomiti S.p.A. L.A.R.E (Linee Aeree Regionali Europee) is an Italian regional airline wholly owned by Lufthansa. Its head office is located in Dossobuono, Villafranca di Verona. Its main bases are at Munich Airport and Frankfurt Airport in Germany.

Air Dolomiti operates routes from several Italian destinations to and from Munich and Frankfurt. Most of these services are sold under the Air Dolomiti brand and codeshare with Lufthansa, while a few remain under the Lufthansa brand.

== History ==
=== Foundation ===
Air Dolomiti was established on 30 December 1989 by the Linee Aeree Europee (L.A.E). The airline's name derives from the section of the Alps known as the Dolomites. It started airline operations in January 1991 with a Trieste-Genoa route. In 1992, the airline started international services with flights from Verona to Munich.

=== Takeover by Lufthansa ===
After several years of co-operation, Lufthansa acquired a 26% stake in January 1999 and increased it to 52% in April 2003 and 100% in July 2003. Although most Lufthansa Regional subsidiaries operate under their parent's name and colours, Air Dolomiti retains its own identity.

The airline employed some 748 people in June 2020. At one time the airline's registered office was in Dossobuono, Villafranca di Verona, while the airline's executive headquarters were in Ronchi dei Legionari.

In September 2018, Lufthansa announced it would expand Air Dolomiti's fleet significantly by 12 pre-owned Embraer 190 and 195 aircraft to be transferred from sister company Lufthansa CityLine. However in late 2021, Lufthansa stated that the transfer was no longer confirmed and may be continued later or on a smaller scale if at all. Later on, two Embraer 195 were transferred from Lufthansa CityLine by spring 2022. In late 2022, Lufthansa confirmed it would transfer further aircraft from Lufthansa CityLine to Air Dolomiti to strengthen the group's presence in Italy after its bid to take over ITA Airways fell apart.

In March 2024, Lufthansa announced plans to expand Air Dolomiti's fleet to 25 aircraft within the year, as the subsidiary is scheduled to take over more routes within the Lufthansa Group network.

== Destinations ==
As of August 2025, Air Dolomiti operates routes from Frankfurt Airport and Munich Airport to 26 destinations in Italy, as well as to other European countries on behalf of its corporate parent, Lufthansa.

Country	City	Airport	Notes	Refs
Austria	Graz	Graz Airport		
Austria	Linz	Linz Airport		
Croatia	Pula	Pula Airport		
Croatia	Rijeka	Rijeka Airport	Seasonal	
Croatia	Zagreb	Zagreb Airport	Begins 25 October 2026	
Czech Republic	Prague	Václav Havel Airport Prague		
Denmark	Aarhus	Aarhus Airport	Terminated	
Denmark	Billund	Billund Airport		
France	Biarritz	Biarritz Pays Basque Airport	Seasonal	
France	Bordeaux	Bordeaux–Mérignac Airport		
France	Figari	Figari–Sud Corse Airport		
France	Lyon	Lyon–Saint-Exupéry Airport		
Germany	Berlin	Berlin Brandenburg Airport		
Germany	Düsseldorf	Düsseldorf Airport		
Germany	Frankfurt	Frankfurt Airport	Hub	
Germany	Munich	Munich Airport	Hub	
Italy	Ancona	Marche Airport		
Italy	Bari	Bari Karol Wojtyła Airport		
Italy	Bologna	Bologna Guglielmo Marconi Airport		
Italy	Brindisi	Brindisi Airport		
Italy	Cagliari	Cagliari Elmas Airport		
Italy	Catania	Catania–Fontanarossa Airport		
Italy	Cuneo	Cuneo International Airport		
Italy	Florence	Florence Airport	Focus city	
Italy	Forlì	Forlì Airport		
Italy	Genoa	Genoa Cristoforo Colombo Airport		
Italy	Milan	Milan Linate Airport		
Italy	Milan	Milan Malpensa Airport		
Italy	Olbia	Olbia Costa Smeralda Airport		
Italy	Palermo	Falcone Borsellino Airport		
Italy	Pisa	Pisa International Airport		
Italy	Trieste	Trieste Airport		
Italy	Turin	Turin Airport		
Italy	Venice	Venice Marco Polo Airport		
Italy	Verona	Verona Villafranca Airport	Focus city	
Luxembourg	Luxembourg	Luxembourg Airport		
Netherlands	Amsterdam	Amsterdam Airport Schiphol		
Poland	Katowice	Katowice Airport		
Poland	Kraków	Kraków John Paul II International Airport		
Poland	Wrocław	Wrocław Airport		
Sweden	Kalmar	Kalmar Airport	Terminated	
Sweden	Ronneby	Ronneby Airport	Terminated	
Switzerland	Geneva	Geneva Airport		
Switzerland	Zurich	Zurich Airport		
Switzerland; France; Germany	Basel; Mulhouse; Freiburg	EuroAirport Basel Mulhouse Freiburg		
United Kingdom	Birmingham	Birmingham Airport		
United Kingdom	London	London City Airport		

=== Codeshare agreements ===
Air Dolomiti has codeshare agreements with the following airlines:

- Air Canada
- Air China
- All Nippon Airways
- ITA Airways
- Lufthansa
- United Airlines

== Sponsorship ==
Over the years, Air Dolomiti has established various partnerships and sponsorships. Its Settimocielo onboard service collaborated with renowned chefs such as Simone Rugiati (2015) and Giancarlo Perbellini (2016), as well as with JRE Jeunes Restaurateurs (2017). The airline also partnered with prominent wineries, including Aneri, Marchesi Antinori, and Masi, which was named Air Dolomiti’s "Wine of the Year" for 2018.

== Fleet ==
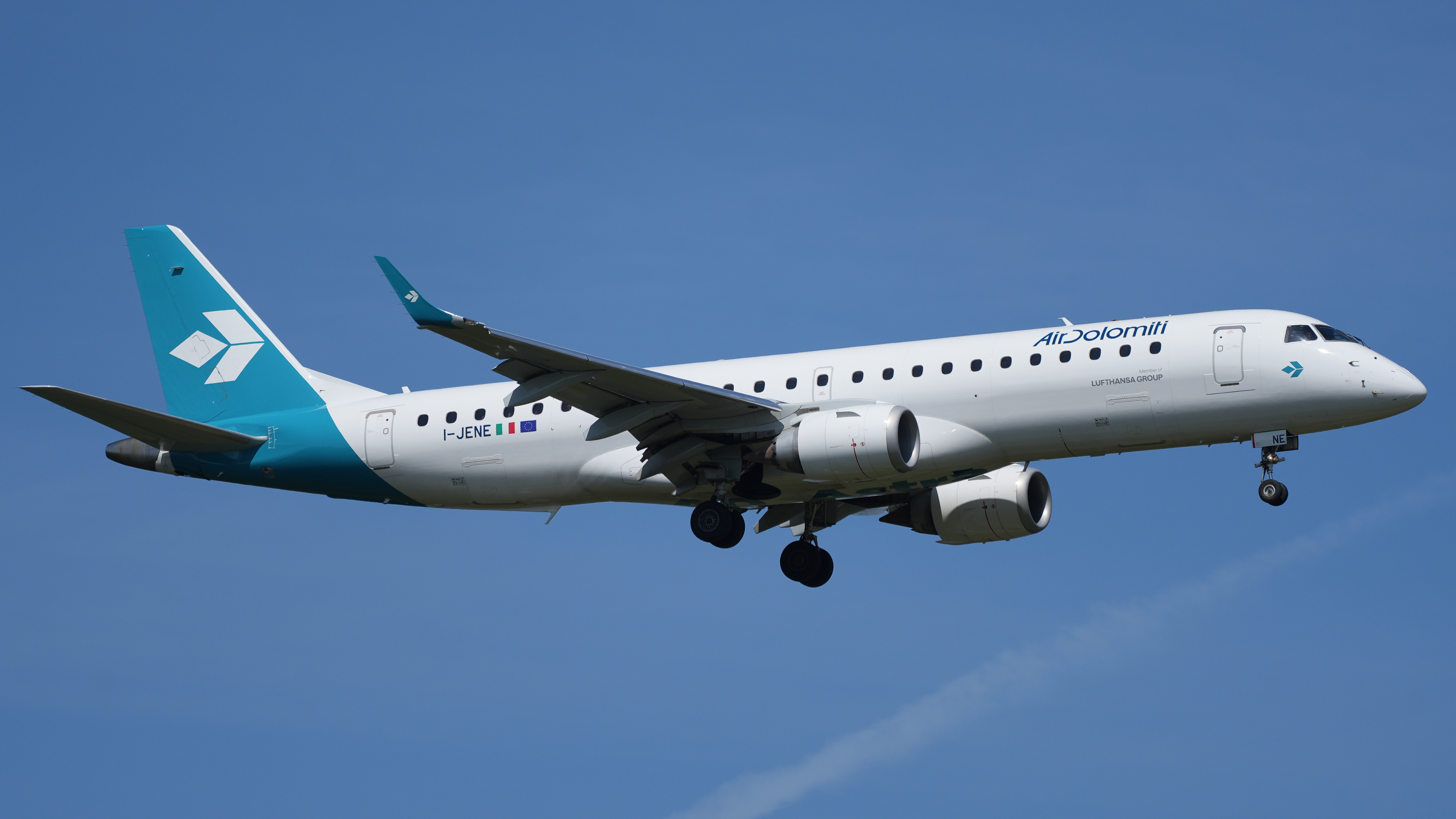
Air Dolomiti Embraer 190

=== Current fleet ===
As of July 2026, Air Dolomiti operates the following aircraft:

Aircraft	In service	Orders	Passengers	Notes
Embraer 190	9	—	108	
Embraer 195	20	10	120	13 aircraft to be transferred from Austrian Airlines by 2028.
Total	29	10		

Several of Air Dolomiti's aircraft were named after Italian operas, as a tribute to the city of Verona and its ancient theatre, the Arena di Verona. The remaining christening names are removed during the repaint into the new livery.

=== Former fleet ===
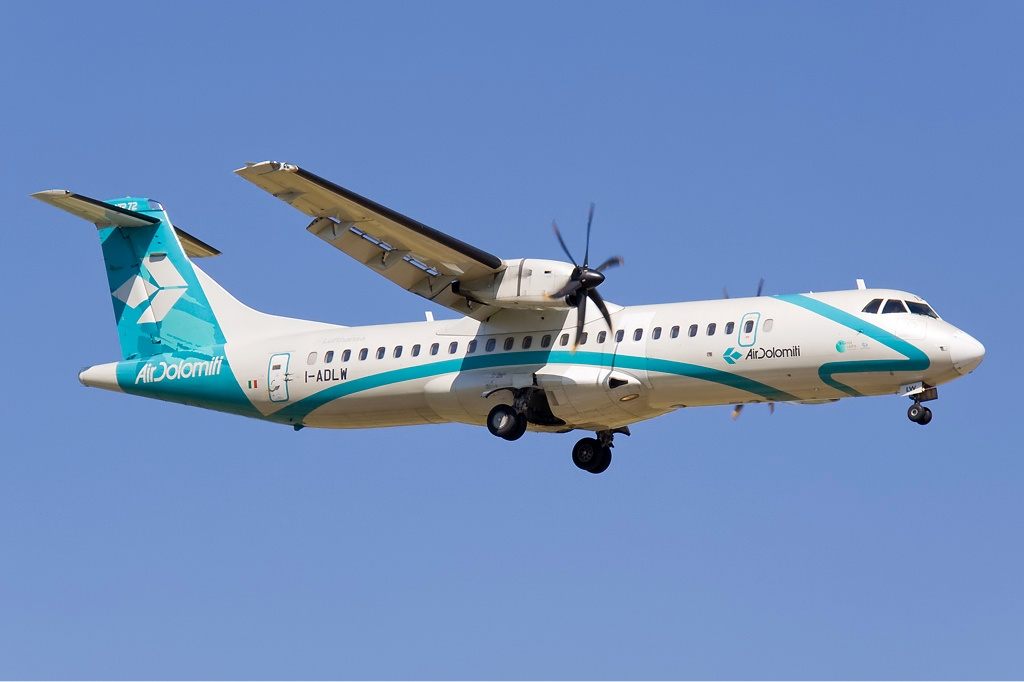
Former Air Dolomiti ATR 72-500 wearing an older livery version.

In the past, Air Dolomiti previously operated the following types of aircraft:

Air Dolomiti Historical Fleet
Aircraft	Total	Introduced	Retired	Notes
ATR 42-300	16	1993	2011	
ATR 72-500	13	2000	2014	
BAe 146-200	1	1998	1998	Leased from Flightline.
BAe 146-300	5	2005	2009	
Bombardier CRJ200	5	2001	2005	Transferred to Eurowings.
de Havilland Canada Dash 8-300	3	1990	1994	
Fokker 100	2	1999	1999	Leased from Alpi Eagles.

== Accidents and incidents ==
- 7 November 1999: Air Dolomiti Flight 2708, a Fokker 100, wet-leased from Alpi Eagles (registration I-ALPL, c/n 11250), flying from Venice, Italy, with 44 on board suffered landing gear failure while on the runway at Barcelona, Spain. It came to rest safely on a grassy area near the runway.
- 24 August 2008: An Air Dolomiti ATR 72 (registration I-ADLM, c/n 543), operating flight LH3990 from Munich, Germany, to Bologna, Italy, abandoned take off due to smoke alarm. The airline treated the evacuation of the aircraft as a minor incident, but on August 26 an amateur video, filmed by a bystander, circulated on television and the Internet. The footage shows tense moments of some 60 passengers jumping from and fleeing the burning plane before the fire department extinguishes the flames.
- 17 May 2012: An Air Dolomiti ATR 72-500 operating on flight EN-1912/LH-1912 from Munich to Venice returned to Munich after the right engine shut down and smoke was discovered in both cockpit and cabin. Shortly after touchdown the plane deviated from the southern runway and came to a standstill about 80 metres (262 feet) into the grass covered side strip. The nose gear was reported to have collapsed in the process. Of the 58 passengers and four crew members aboard, five passengers were reported to have received minor injuries.
