= Alpi Eagles =

Airline of Italy (1979–2007)

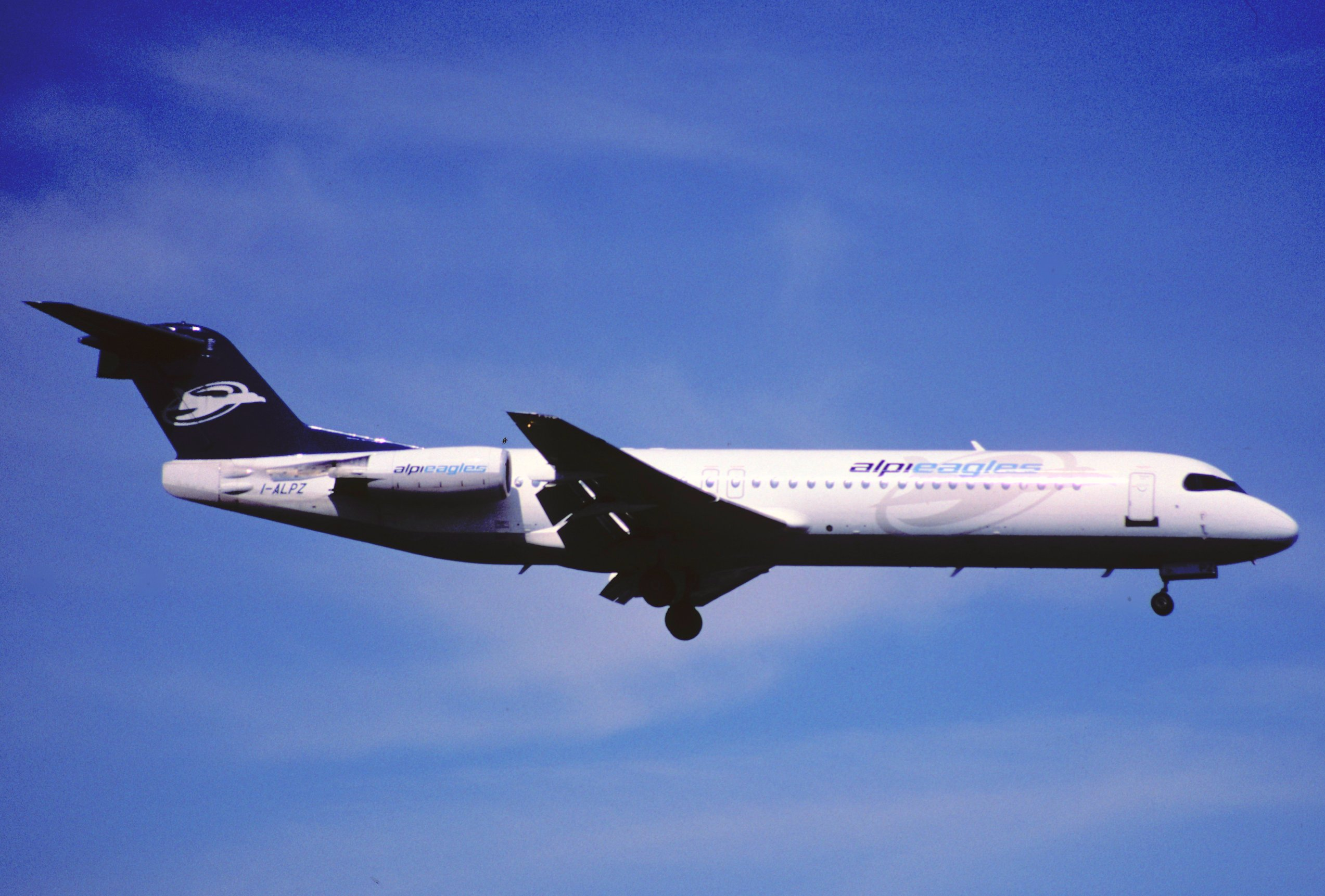
- Fokker 100
IATA	ICAO	Call sign
E8	ELG	ALPI EAGLES
- Founded: 1979
- Ceased operations: 2007
- Hubs: Venice Marco Polo Airport
- Fleet size: 16
- Headquarters: Sant'Angelo di Piove di Sacco, Province of Padua, Veneto, Italy
- Key people: Paolo Sinigalia
- Website: alpieagles.com/?lang=EN

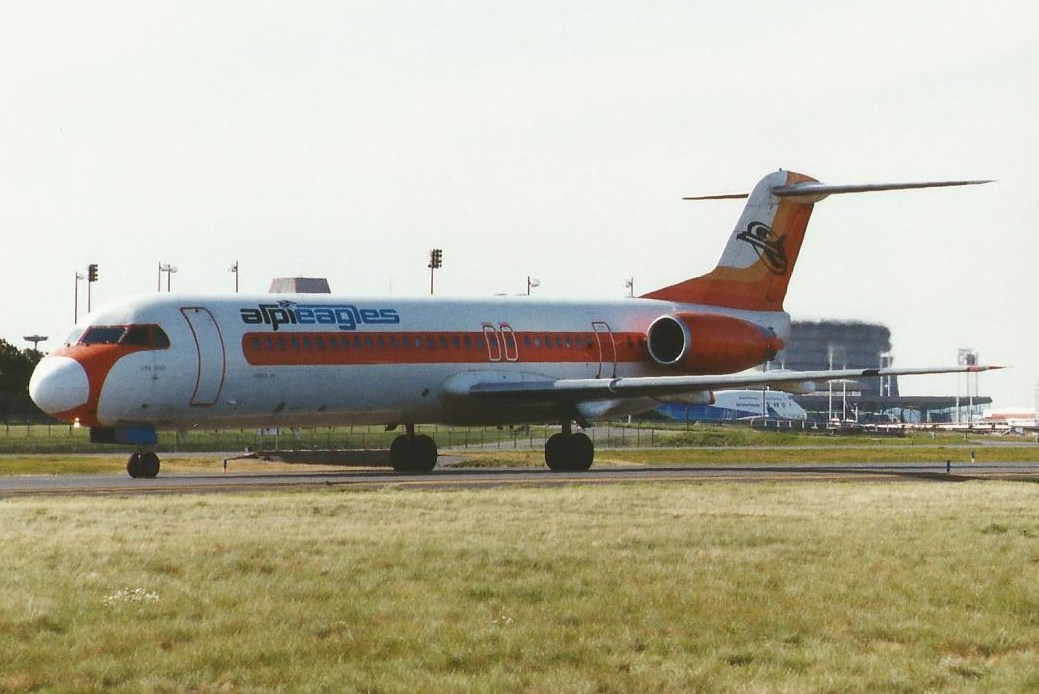
The very first colors of Fokker 100

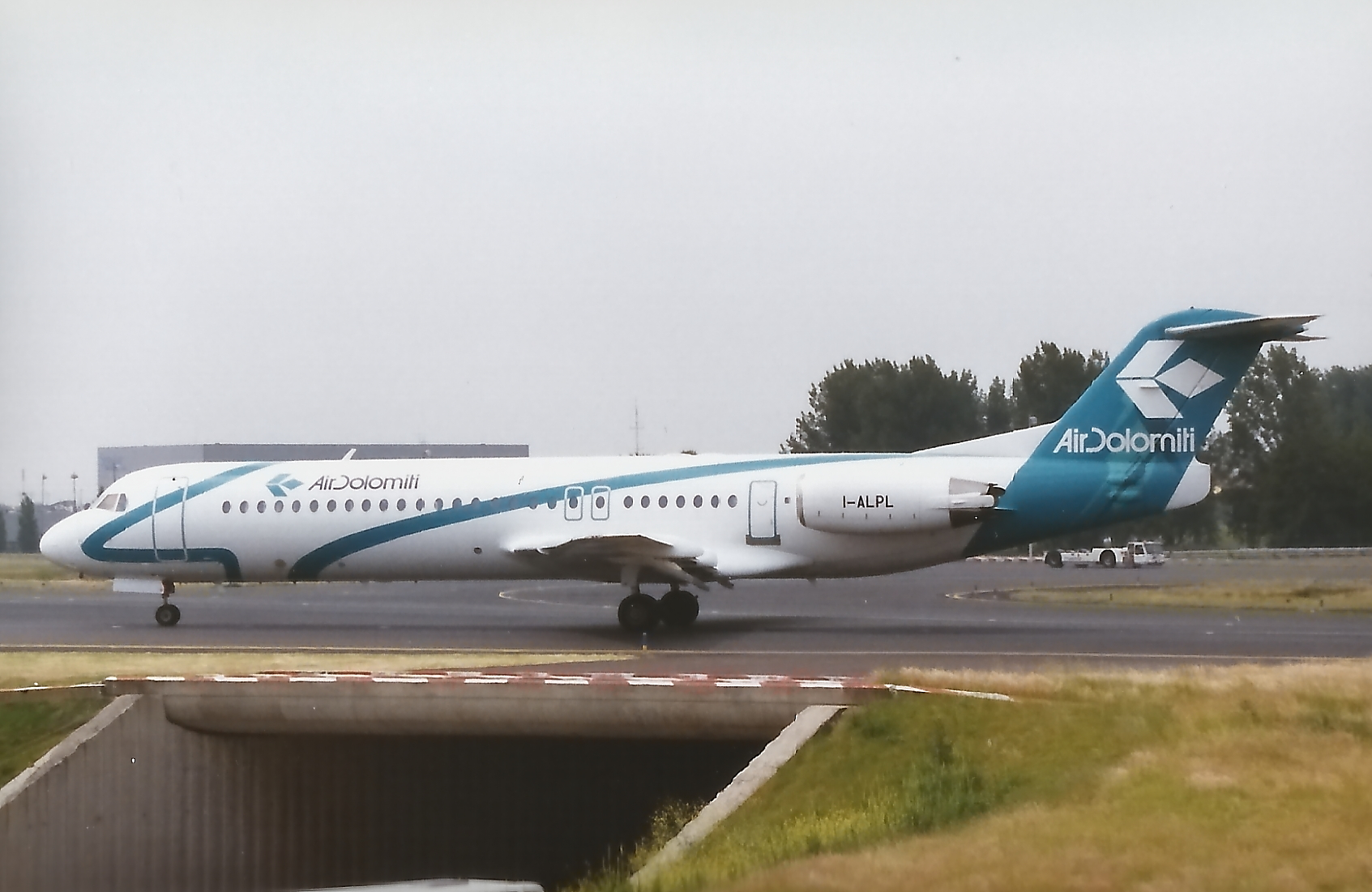
A Fokker 100 operated on behalf Air Dolomiti

Alpi Eagles SpA was an airline headquartered in Sant'Angelo di Piove di Sacco, Italy. The privately owned regional airline operated scheduled passenger services, linking 15 domestic destinations, as well as international services to Albania, Czech Republic, France, Romania, Russia, Spain and Ukraine. Its main base was Venice Marco Polo Airport.

== History ==
The company was founded in 1979 as an acrobatic team. From 1984 it focused exclusively on air taxis and private flights with Gates Learjet 25, Gates Learjet 35, Gates Learjet 55, Cessna Citation. It became a fully-fledged airline in 1986. The first scheduled flights began in June 1996. Three years later, the network included five domestic destinations and the Venice-Athens route. A majority of the shares were later purchased by Paolo Sinigalia, owner of the Simod shoe factory, in Padova, Italy.

One of the company's decisions was to "cut" the scheduled block times (scheduled time from engine start to engine shut down), because pilots were paid based on their block time. Flights were delayed; management then decided to cut scheduled turnover times. Maintenance was unable to repair airplanes on time, resulting in flight delays. Four-hour delays became routine at the Venice and Naples airports. Passengers slowly reverted to Air One Cityliner, despite preferring to fly AlpiEagles airplanes for comfort.

Pilots started to leave the company; more flights were delayed or canceled due to lack of personnel, crew rest periods, and other reasons. More passengers turned to Air One Cityliner.

In September 2007, the Italian Civil Aviation Authority (ENAC) informed passengers that Alpi Eagles's license was under investigation, due to insufficient financial resources. Their license to operate was suspended by the Italian authorities in October 2007. After legal action, a provisional license was issued by ENAC, valid until 31 December 2007. However, in December 2007, Alpi Eagles was forbidden to operate by ENAC, effective 1 January 2008.

Alpi Eagles' final act took place at the Venice Court. In 2010, the extraordinary administration commissioner, Gianluca Vidal, filed for bankruptcy, but at the hearing in late November of that year, the company's former president and founder, Paolo Sinigaglia, appeared, requesting an extension because he claimed to be in contact with potential buyers. This led to the bankruptcy hearing being postponed twice, first to February and then to May 2011.

At the hearing on May 3, the request for a commitment to pay 1.5 million euros with an immediate down payment of 10%, equal to 150,000 euros, was opposed only by a new request for an extension, which this time the Tribunal panel did not accept, declaring Alpi Eagles bankrupt with a subsequent decree.

== Fleet ==
Alpi Eagles historical fleet
Aircraft	Total	Introduced	Retired	Remarks
Learjet 35A	2	1989	1991	I-ALPM, I-ALPT
Learjet 55	1	1990	1997	I-ALPR
Boeing 737NG	2	2002	2003	OY-MRI, OY-MRX leased from Maersk Air
Fokker 100	11	1996	2008	F-GNLH, F-HALP, SE-DUR, 9A-BTE on lease

From September 2002, through January 2003, Alpi Eagles operated two Boeing 737-700, which had been leased from Danish airline Maersk Air.

Two of Alpi Eagles's Fokker aircraft had been wetleased to Air Dolomiti from May 1999, until December 1999, in the full Air Dolomiti colour scheme. One of those aircraft was involved in an incident at Barcelona's El Prat Airport (Spain) on November 7, 1999, when half of the main landing gear failed to lock, and collapsed during landing (see Air Dolomiti Accidents and incidents).
