= Sant'Angelo di Piove di Sacco =

- Comune
- Comune di Sant'Angelo di Piove di Sacco
- Location within Italy Location within Veneto
- Coordinates: 45.348°N 12.0029°E
- Country: Italy
- Region: Veneto
- Province: Province of Padua (PD)
- Frazioni: Vigorovea, Celeseo

Area
  - Total: 14.0 km^{2} (5.4 sq mi)
- Elevation: 8 m (26 ft)

Population (31-08-2021)
  - Total: 7,283
  - Density: 520/km^{2} (1,350/sq mi)
- Demonym: Santangiolesi
- Time zone: UTC+1 (CET)
  - Summer (DST): UTC+2 (CEST)
- Postal code: 35020
- Dialing code: 049
- Website: https://www.comune.santangelodipiovedisacco.pd.it/

Sant'Angelo di Piove di Sacco is a comune (municipality) in the Province of Padua in the Italian region Veneto, located about 25 kilometres (16 mi) west of Venice and about 12 kilometres (7.5 mi) east of Padua. As of 31 August 2021, it had a population of 7,283 and an area of 14.0 square kilometres (5.4 mi^{2}).

The municipality of Sant'Angelo di Piove di Sacco contains the frazioni (subdivisions, mainly villages and hamlets) Vigorovea and Celeseo.

Sant'Angelo di Piove di Sacco borders the following municipalities: Brugine, Campolongo Maggiore, Fossò, Legnaro, Piove di Sacco, Saonara, Vigonovo.

== Economy ==
The airline Alpi Eagles had its head office in Sant'Angelo di Piove di Sacco.

== Demographic evolution ==
Historical population

Year	Pop.	±%
1861	?	—
1871	2,615	—
1881	2,978	+13.9%
1901	3,487	+17.1%
1911	4,233	+21.4%

Year	Pop.	±%
1921	4,942	+16.7%
1931	5,111	+3.4%
1936	5,266	+3.0%
1951	5,610	+6.5%
1961	5,021	−10.5%

Year	Pop.	±%
1971	5,605	+11.6%
1981	5,861	+4.6%
1991	6,007	+2.5%
2001	6,665	+11.0%

Source: Data from ISTAT
