= Saonara =

Municipality in Veneto, Italy

- Comune
- Comune di Saonara
- Location within Italy Location within Veneto
- Coordinates: 45°22′N 11°59′E
- Country: Italy
- Region: Veneto
- Province: Province of Padua (PD)

Area
  - Total: 13.5 km^{2} (5.2 sq mi)

Population (31-08-2021)
  - Total: 10,531
  - Density: 780/km^{2} (2,020/sq mi)
- Time zone: UTC+1 (CET)
  - Summer (DST): UTC+2 (CEST)
- Postal code: 35020
- Dialing code: 049

Saonara is a comune (municipality) in the Province of Padua in the Italian region Veneto, located about 25 kilometres (16 mi) southwest of Venice and about 11 kilometres (7 mi) southeast of Padua. As of 31 August 2021, it had a population of 10,531 and an area of 13.5 square kilometres (5.2 mi^{2}).

Saonara borders the following municipalities: Legnaro, Padua, Sant'Angelo di Piove di Sacco, Vigonovo.

== Demographic evolution ==
Historical population

Year	Pop.	±%
1861	?	—
1871	2,569	—
1881	2,912	+13.4%
1901	3,249	+11.6%
1911	3,862	+18.9%

Year	Pop.	±%
1921	4,422	+14.5%
1931	4,790	+8.3%
1936	4,872	+1.7%
1951	5,455	+12.0%
1961	5,710	+4.7%

Year	Pop.	±%
1971	6,419	+12.4%
1981	6,608	+2.9%
1991	7,149	+8.2%
2001	8,946	+25.1%

Source: Data from ISTAT
