= Intimissimi =

Italian clothing brand

Intimissimi S.p.A.

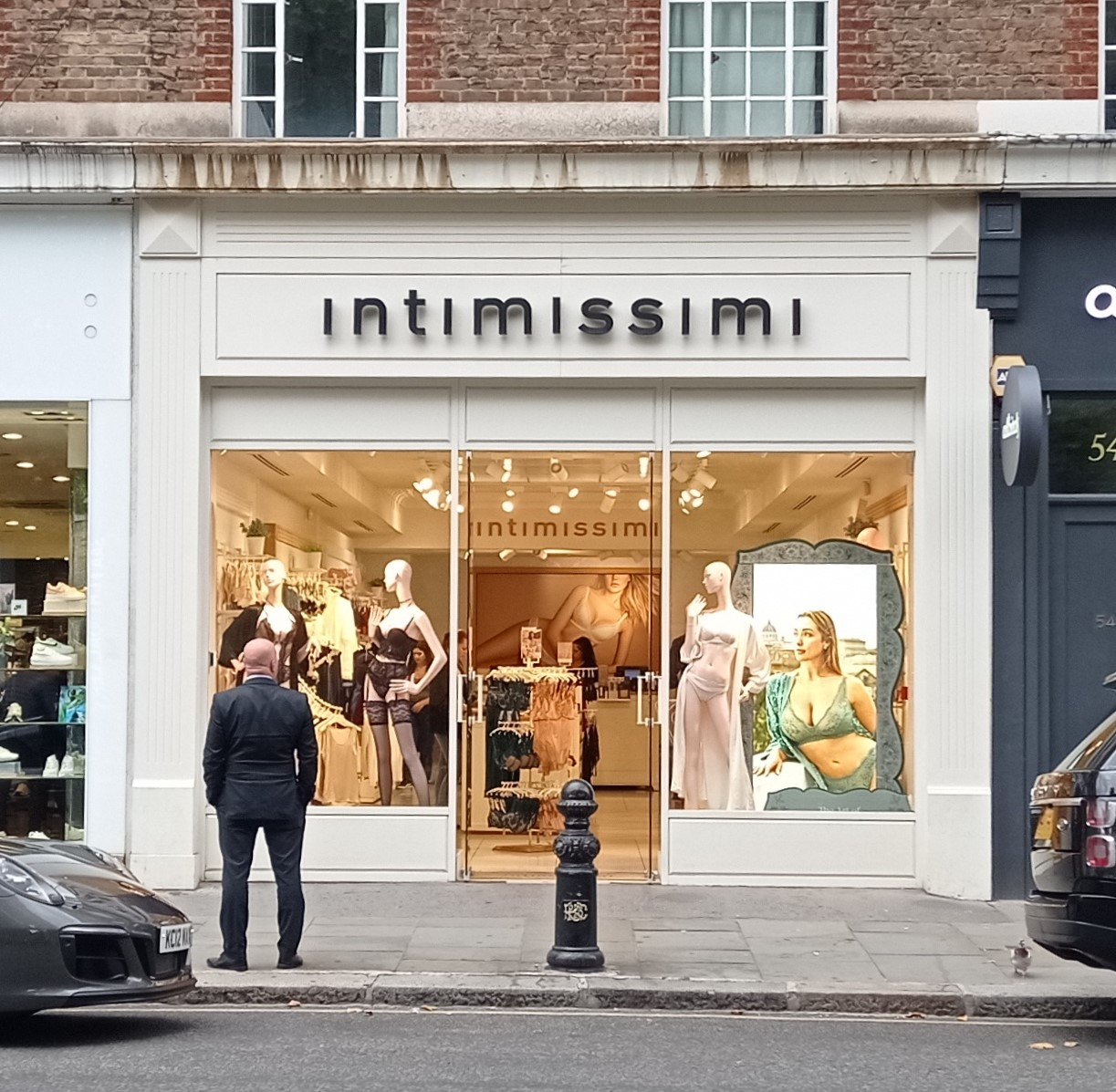
- Type: Public
- Founded: 1996; 30 years ago
- Founder: Sandro Veronesi
- Headquarters: Dossobuono di Villafranca di Verona, Veneto, Italy
- Products: Clothing
- Parent: Calzedonia S.p.A.
- Website: www.intimissimi.com

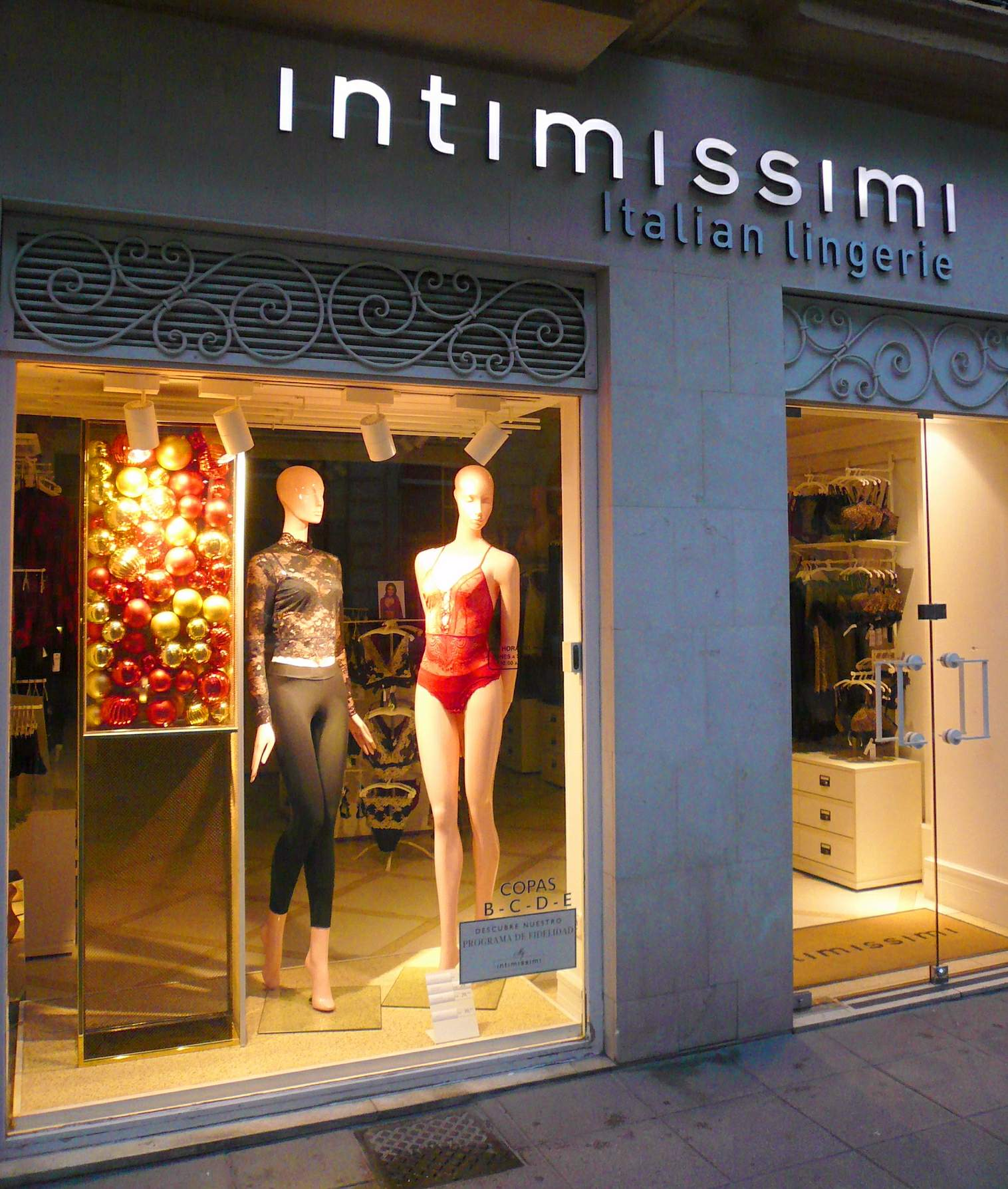
Intimissimi, Calle Dato, Vitoria, Spain, 2020

Intimissimi is an Italian clothing label founded in 1996, which specializes in bras, briefs, lingerie, vests, and pyjamas for women and men.

== History ==
The brand was launched in 1996 by Sandro Veronesi.

Starting in 2005, Intimissimi clothing was sold through Victoria's Secret in a third-party partnership arrangement. The partnership also included the creation and launch of an Intimissimi beauty line in Victoria's Secret's stores, and the distribution of Intimissimi products in Victoria's Secret's outlet stores. By 2006, the company had opened over 1,000 single-brand stores worldwide.

In 2015, the model Shlomit Malka became the face of Intimissimi. She led the company's international advertising campaigns until she was replaced in 2017 by Dakota Johnson.

In October 2017, the brand launched its fourth edition of Intimissimi on ice in the Verona Arena, with costumes designed by Chiara Ferragni. Intimissimi was one brand she used as a "symbolic vocabulary". In October 2017, Intimissimi opened a 500-square-foot store on New York's Fifth Avenue.

For the 2017 campaign Mario Testino photographed Serbian ex-sportswoman Ana Ivanovic, food writer Ella Mills, model Irina Shayk, and actress Dakota Johnson.

In June 2020, Intimissimi launched the Infinity shelf service, a system which removes the risk of out-of-stock by drawing from the e-commerce window. In 2023, the brand and Jennifer Lopez released the capsule collection 'This Is Me Now' in which the singer came out with a more mature body to show.

== See also ==
- List of Italian companies
