= Aldo Miniussi =

Italian academic (1919–1979)

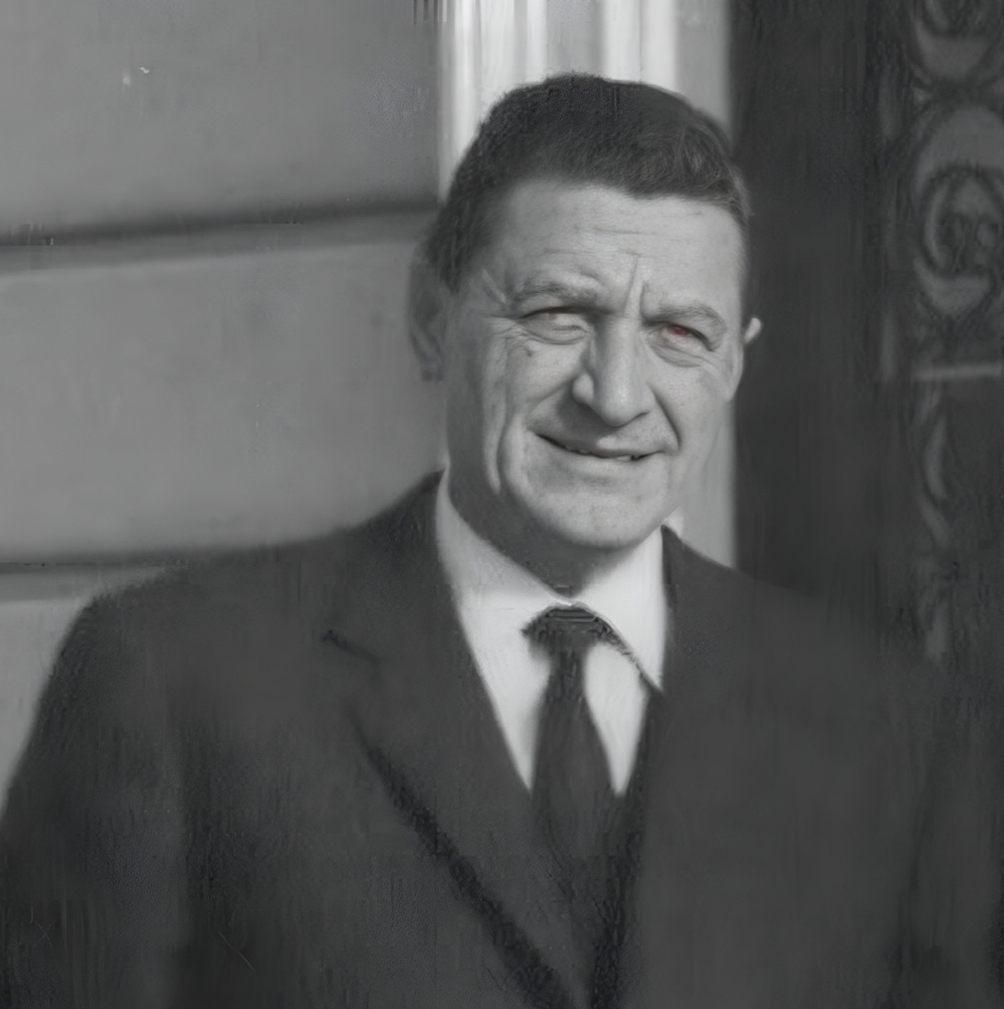
- Born: 19 March 1919; Ronchi dei Legionari, Kingdom of Italy
- Died: 19 August 1979 (aged 60); Udine, Italy
- Occupations: Educator, lexicographer, journalist
- Known for: Co-author of the Vocabolario fraseologico del dialetto bisiàc

Aldo Miniussi (19 March 1919 – 19 August 1979) was an Italian educator, lexicographer, and journalist. He is best known for his work as co-author of the Vocabolario fraseologico del dialetto bisiàc, a foundational reference dictionary for the Bisiac dialect spoken in the "Bisiacaria" (Bisiacary) region of Friuli-Venezia Giulia.

== Biography ==
=== Early life and World War II ===
Miniussi graduated from the "Scipio Slataper" teacher-training institute in Gorizia in 1937, later continuing higher education studies in pedagogy in Turin and Padua. During his youth, he studied under the Futurist painter Tullio Crali and developed a lifelong passion for drawing.

During World War II, he served as a reserve officer in the Italian Army during the Yugoslavia campaign in 1941, receiving a military valor award. Following the Armistice of 8 September 1943, he returned to Ronchi dei Legionari.

=== Post-war activity and career ===
After the war, Miniussi was appointed municipal councillor under the Allied Military Government in the region. He also served as secretary of the AS Ronchi sports association and worked as a local correspondent for several regional publications, including the Trieste-based newspaper Il Piccolo, as well as Il Semaforo, La Voce Libera, and Il Friuli Sportivo. From 1948 onward, he worked as a full-time elementary school teacher in San Pier d'Isonzo and Ronchi dei Legionari.

Miniussi was also active in local theater, the "Giuseppe Verdi" amateur drama company in Ronchi dei Legionari, where he worked as a director and playwright for over a decade. In 1968, together with Giordano Vittori and F. Gismano, he directed Nuova matematica, an educational short film about set theory in primary education.

=== Dialectological studies and literary work ===
Beginning in 1960, Miniussi collaborated with Silvio Domini, Aldo Fulizio, and Giordano Vittori to collect materials for the Vocabolario fraseologico del dialetto bisiac. Published posthumously in 1985, the work became a standard lexicographical text on the Bisiacco dialect and has been widely cited in Romance linguistics, dialectology studies, and regional literary works.

He also composed poetry and prose in the Bisiac dialect, and translated works by classical Italian writers into the dialect, including pieces by Gabriele D'Annunzio.

Contrary to what other sources write, Aldo Miniussi was never a member of the "Deputazione di Storia Patria per il Friuli" (Deputation of the History of the Friuli Region), even if he was always included in the "Dizionario Biografico dei Friulani" (Biographical Dictionary of Friulians).

== Works ==
- Biografia e scelta di scritti in memoria di Giordano Vittori (co-edited with S. Domini and A. Fulizio), Monfalcone, 1975.
- Proverbi della Bisiacaria (with S. Domini and A. Fulizio), Gorizia, 1978.
- Breve discorso sulla parola 'bisiac' '(with Silvio Domini) , number 1 of the Review "Il Territorio", Ronchi dei Legionari, Consorzio Culturale del Monfalconese, 1978.
- Al trozo, Udine, 1980 (posthumous).
- Vocabolario fraseologico del dialetto bisiàc (co-author with S. Domini, A. Fulizio, G. Vittori), Bologna, Cappelli, 1985 (posthumous).
- "Veneto e Bisiacaria: Note a 'Libera nos a malo' di Luigi Meneghello", Nuova Iniziativa Isontina, vol. 3 (1991), pp. 33–39.
