= Villafranca di Verona =

- Comune
- Comune di Villafranca di Verona
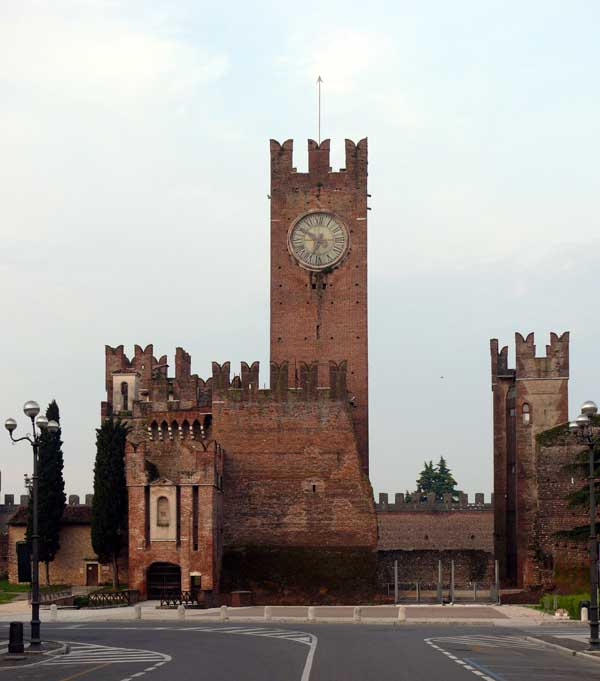
- Scaliger Castle

- Coat of arms

- Location within Italy Location within Veneto
- Coordinates: 45°21′N 10°51′E
- Country: Italy
- Region: Veneto
- Province: Verona (VR)
- Frazioni: Alpo, Caluri, Dossobuono, Pizzoletta, Quaderni, Rizza, Rosegaferro

Government
  - Mayor: Roberto Dall'Oca

Area
  - Total: 57.43 km^{2} (22.17 sq mi)
- Elevation: 54 m (177 ft)

Population (1 January 2010)
  - Total: 32,866
  - Density: 572.3/km^{2} (1,482/sq mi)
- Demonym: Villafranchesi
- Time zone: UTC+1 (CET)
  - Summer (DST): UTC+2 (CEST)
- Postal code: 37069
- Dialing code: 045
- Patron saint: Saint Peter and Saint Paul
- Saint day: 29 June
- Website: Official website

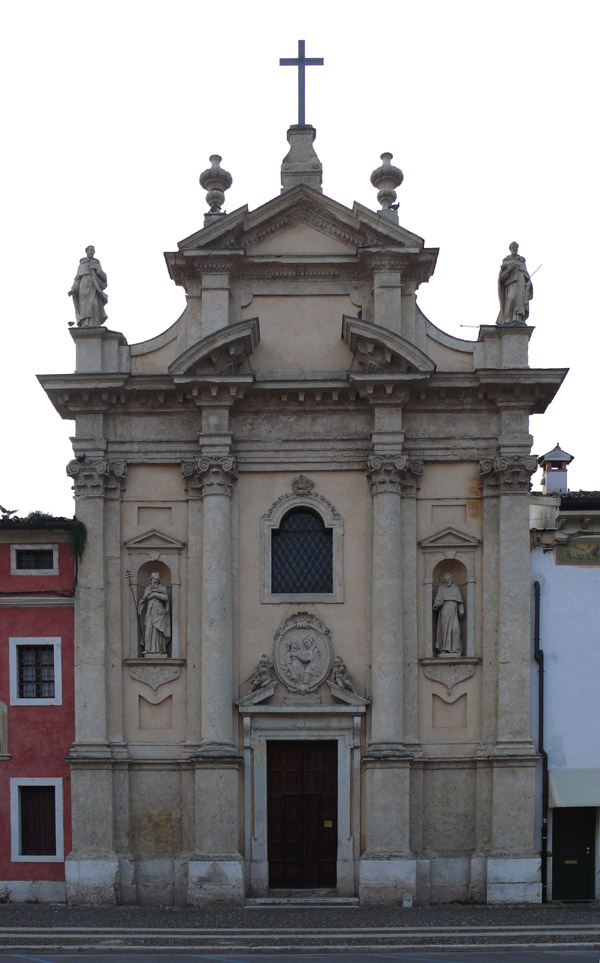
Church of Disciplina.

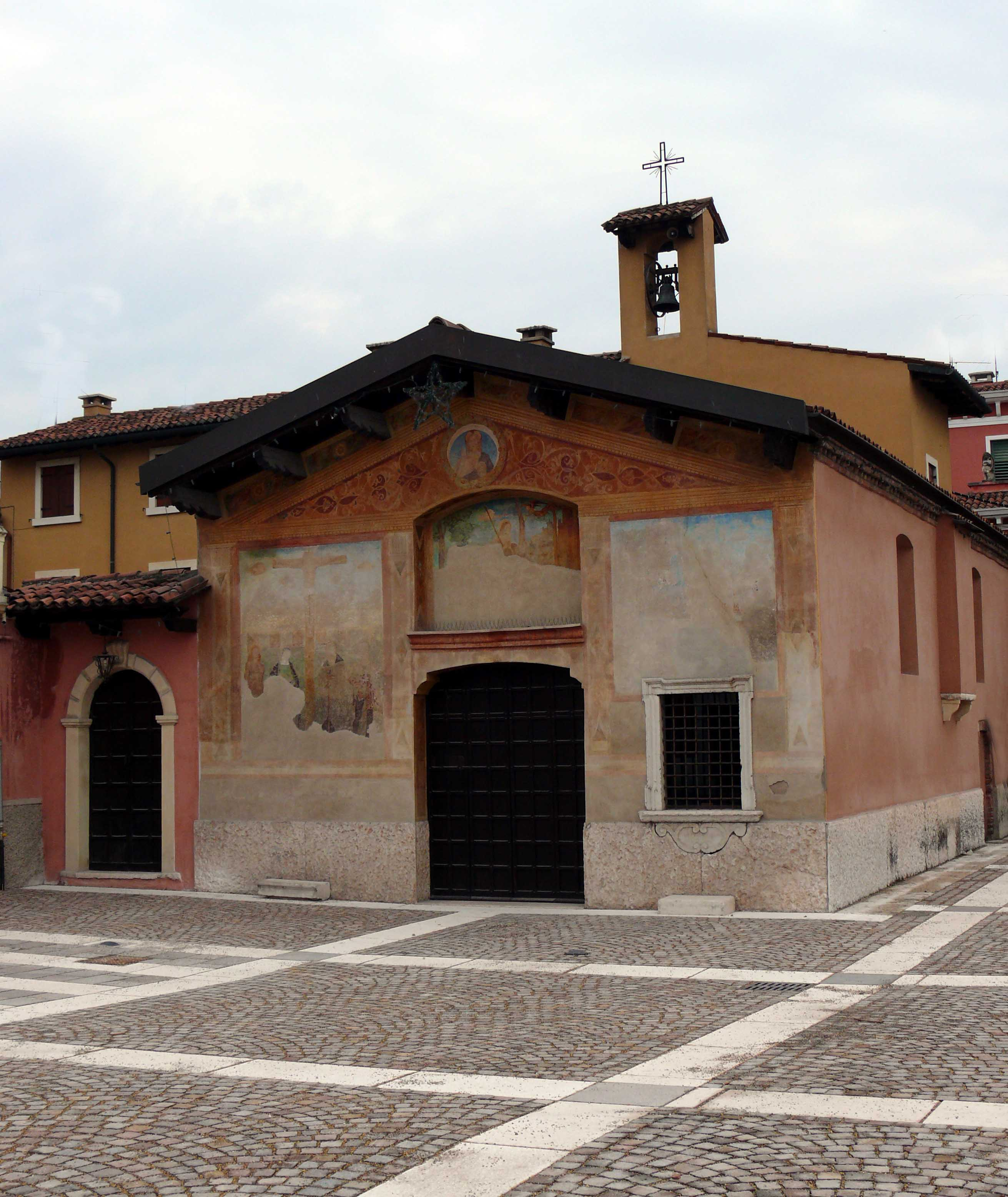
Church of San Rocco.

Villafranca di Verona is a town and comune in the province of Verona in the Veneto, Northern Italy.

== History ==
In the Middle Ages, on occasion of the foundation of the Rectors' Council of Verona, on March 9, 1185, it received the privilege of a tax free town, from which derived the name of villa franca.

It was the site of the signature of the Treaty of Villafranca, between Napoleon III and the Austrian army, which concluded the Second Italian Independence War. Nearby was the site of the Battle of Custoza, during the Third War of Italian Independence.

== Main sights ==
- Castle, built from 1199. One of its towers has stones coming from an arch entitled to the Roman emperor Tiberius. The castle was destroyed several times, but was rebuilt by the Republic of Venice, until it was abandoned in 1450.
- Church of Disciplina or of Visitazione (15th century). Donated by the Count Giorgio Maffei in 1499 to the Confraternity of Disciplinati, it has a Baroque façade and houses the "Mortorio", recently restored, a group of 9 wooden statues showing Jesus Christ, Nicodemus, Joseph of Arimatea, Mary, Mary of Cleofa, Mary Betania, Mary Magdalene and the former owner of the Church.
- San Rocco Church (15th century). It houses frescoes from the school of Domenico Morone.
- Church of San Giovanni della Paglia (15th century), built for the Knights of Malta. Today it is a private church.
- Cathedral (17th century), dedicated to Sts. Peter and Paul.
- Serraglio (14th century), a defensive wall built by the Scaliger to protect the southeastern side of the territory, now in ruins. Started by Mastino II in 1345 and completed by Cangrande II in 1355, it was 13 kilometers long, with defensive towers, and followed the course of the river Tione.
- Bottagisio Palace, location of the peace treaty signing

== Economy ==
Villafranca has an important commercial tradition: every Wednesday morning in the city center there is an important market.

Agriculture is specialized in fruit, and as a consequence of this, Villafranca owns an important trade market for peaches.

As for gastronomy, typical of this town are taiadele coi fegadini (tagliatelle in broth with liver of chicken), and sfogliatine, fragrant doughnuts prepared by many pastries in the town.

Verona Airport "Valerio Catullo" is located in Villafranca di Verona. Verona Airport and Brescia Airport "Gabriele D'Annunzio" constitute the "Garda's Airport System."

Air Dolomiti, a regional airline and Lufthansa subsidiary, maintains its head office in Dossobuono, Villafranca di Verona. At one time the airline's registered office was in Dossobuono, Villafranca di Verona, while the airline's executive headquarters were in Ronchi dei Legionari.

== Notable people ==
- Giovanni Battista Troiani (1844–1927), sculptor
