= Rosegaferro =

Coordinates: 45°20′43″N 10°48′34″E

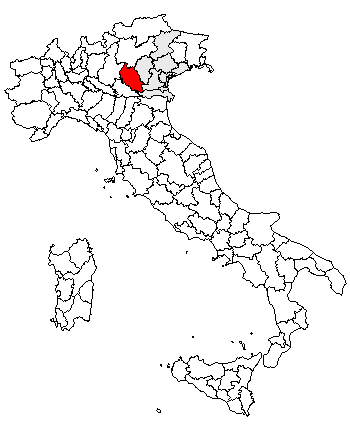
Location of the province of Verona

Rosegaferro is a town in the Veneto, in northeast Italy. It is a frazione of the comune of Villafranca di Verona, in the province of Verona. It has a population of around 1300.

== History ==
The parish church was constructed in 1754 and was widened to a Latin Cross architecture in 1952.
