= Silvio Domini =

Italian writer, historian and educator

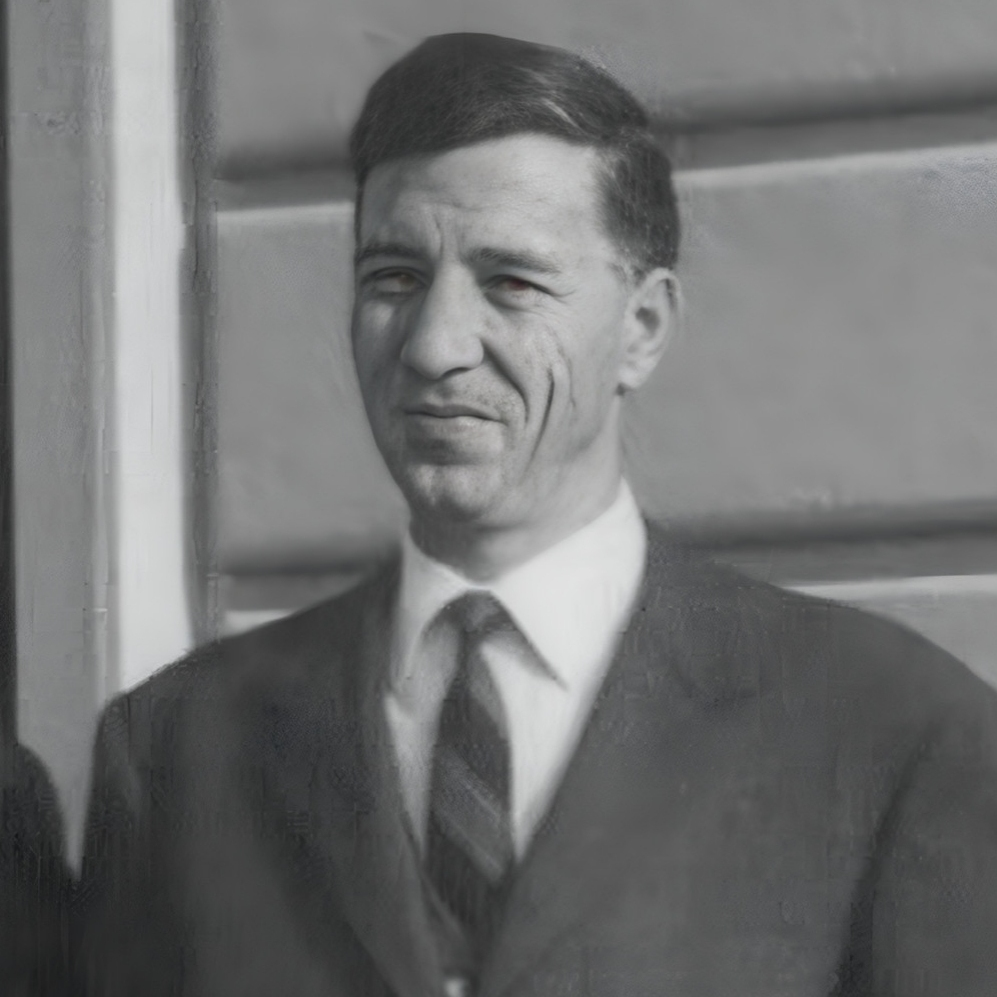
- Portrait of Silvio Domini, 1970
- Born: 1922; Ronchi dei Legionari, Kingdom of Italy
- Died: December 9, 2005 (aged 82–83)
- Occupations: Writer, historian, educator
- Writing career
- Notable work: Vocabolario fraseologico del dialetto bisiàc

Silvio Domini (1922 – 9 December 2005) was an Italian writer, historian, and educator. He is best known for his lexicographical work on the Bisiac dialect, as well as his historical research and dialectal poetry.

== Biography ==
Silvio Domini was born in Ronchi dei Legionari in 1922. After graduating from a teacher training institute (istituto magistrale), he worked as a schoolteacher until 1976. Alongside his teaching career, he was active as a violinist, painter, and local history researcher.

In 1957, Domini was appointed honorary inspector for the superintendency of archaeology, fine arts, and landscape for Friuli-Venezia Giulia. During his tenure, he was involved in the restoration of Villa Vicentini Miniussi in Ronchi dei Legionari. In 1969, he became a corresponding member, and in 1986 a fellow (deputato), of the Deputazione di storia patria per il Friuli in Udine and for Venezia Giulia in Trieste.

In 1985, together with Aldo Fulizio, Aldo Miniussi, and Giordano Vittori, Domini published the Vocabolario fraseologico del dialect bisiàc ("Phraseological Dictionary of the Bisiac Dialect"), a monumental work resulting from nearly thirty years of collaborative research. Spanning 580 pages and containing over 20,000 headwords, it is considered the most comprehensive study of the Bisiac dialect today. The dictionary includes etymological backgrounds (archaic Venetian roots, as well as historical borrowings from Friulian, Slovene, and German), phonetic transcriptions documenting local pronunciation variants, and phraseological structures mapping real-world contexts and idiomatic expressions. The publication by Cappelli brought the study of Bisiacco into wider Italian and international dialectology.

The work received attention from scholars, including a review by linguist Manlio Cortelazzo in Memorie storiche forogiuliesi, a critical essay by glottologist Mario Doria in Il Territorio, and an academic review in Romance Philology published by the University of California Press.

In 1987, Domini was one of the founders and the first president of the Associazione Culturale Bisiaca. He also co-founded the local Pro Loco of Ronchi dei Legionari, the Consorzio Culturale del Monfalconese, and the Istituto Giuliano di Storia, Cultura e Documentazione. In 1993, he was awarded the title of Commander of the Order of Merit of the Italian Republic (Commendatore).

Domini also wrote dialectal poetry, winning regional and national literary awards. Several of his writings have been translated into Slovene.

Domini died on 9 December 2005.

== Selected works ==
- Na veta curta (1973)
- Verdo sul tal (1976)
- Mazidi e sogni (1978)
- Lucamara (1985)
- Vocabolario fraseologico del dialetto bisiàc (with A. Fulizio, A. Miniussi, G. Vittori; Cappelli, 1985)
- Discolz pai trozi de l'anema (1990)
- Vistù de verdo (1993)
- All'ombra della rocca. La storia di Monfalcone (Mgs Press, 2002)

== Honours ==
- Commander of the Order of Merit of the Italian Republic (1993)
