= Dossobuono =

Coordinates: 45°24′N 10°55′E

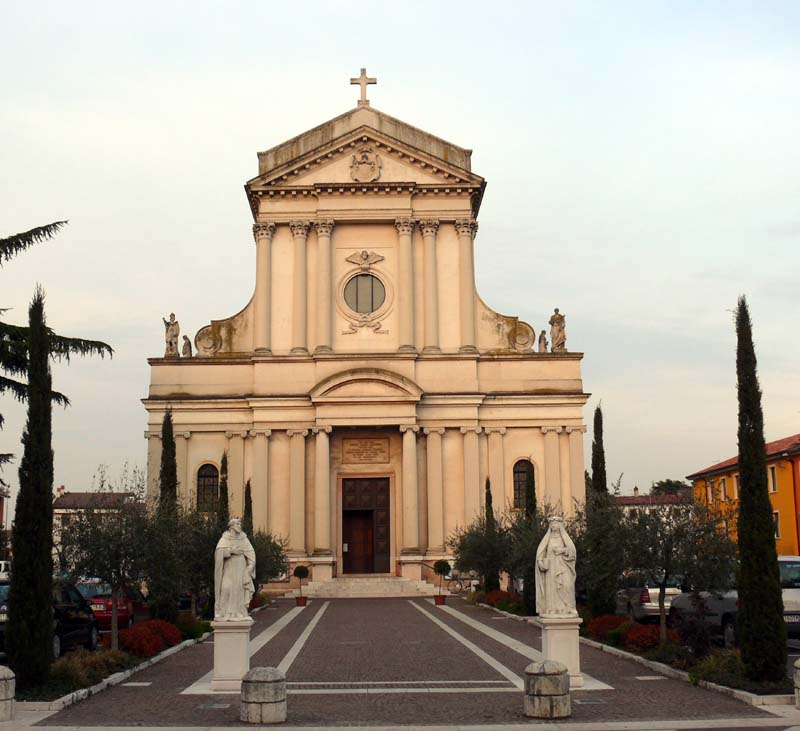
Parish church of Dossobuono.

Dossobuono is a town in the Veneto, in northeast Italy. It is a frazione of the comune of Villafranca di Verona, in the province of Verona. It has a population of around 6400.

Air Dolomiti, a regional airline and Lufthansa subsidiary, maintains its head office in Dossobuono. At one time the airline's registered office was in Dossobuono, while the airline's executive headquarters were in Ronchi dei Legionari.
