= Ronchi dei Legionari =

Ronchi dei Legionari Città di Ronchi dei Legionari
- Comune
- City of Ronchi dei Legionari
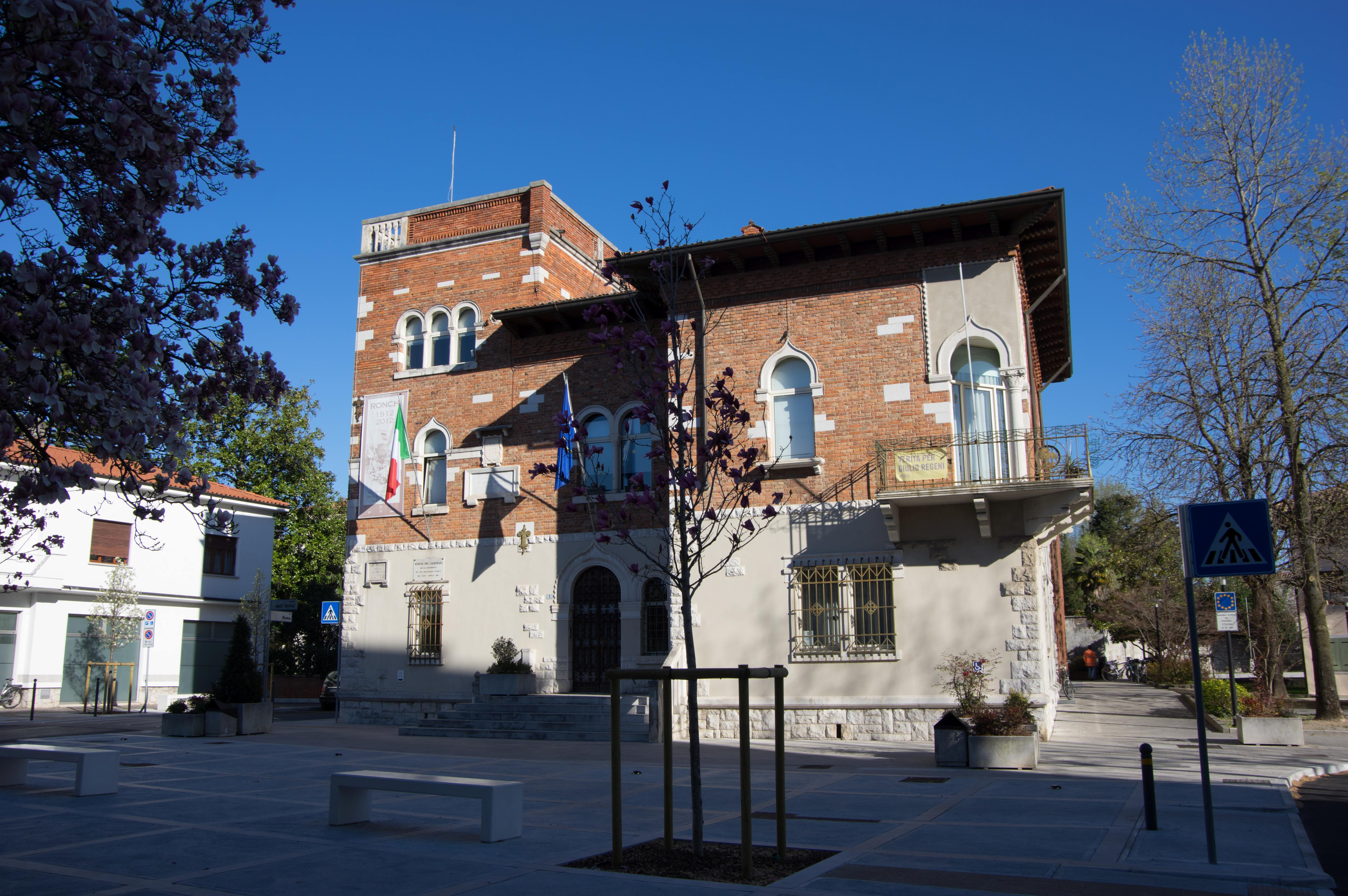

- Location within Italy Location within Friuli-Venezia Giulia
- Coordinates: 45°50′N 13°30′E
- Country: Italy
- Region: Friuli-Venezia Giulia
- Province: Gorizia (GO)
- Frazioni: San Vito, Selz, Soleschiano, Vermegliano

Government
  - Mayor: Mauro Benvenuto

Area
  - Total: 17.0 km^{2} (6.6 sq mi)
- Elevation: 11 m (36 ft)

Population (31 December 2025)
  - Total: 11,859
  - Density: 698/km^{2} (1,810/sq mi)
- Demonym(s): Ronchesi, Ronchitani
- Time zone: UTC+1 (CET)
  - Summer (DST): UTC+2 (CEST)
- Postal code: 34077
- Dialing code: 0481
- Patron saint: St. Lawrence
- Saint day: 10 August
- Website: Official website

Ronchi dei Legionari (Bisiacco: Ronchi; Friulian: Roncjis, Slovene: Ronke, German: Ronkis) is a comune (municipality) in the regional decentralization entity of Gorizia in Friuli-Venezia Giulia, northeast Italy, about 14 km (9 mi) southwest of Gorizia and 30 km (19 mi) northwest of Trieste. It is the location of Trieste – Friuli Venezia Giulia Airport, the major commercial airport serving the region.

The origins of the name Ronchi dei Legionari have been documented since 1229 in the Friulian form Ronches.

The comune was called Ronchi di Monfalcone up to 1925. It owes its current name to the Legionaries of Gabriele D'Annunzio, who set out with deserters of the Royal Italian Army's 2nd Grenadiers Regiment I Battalion from the town on 12 September 1919 (the so-called March of Ronchi), to start the Enterprise of Fiume.

According to the Italian census of 1971, 4% of the population was of Slovene ethnicity, while according to the Austrian census of 1910 only 1% of the population was Slovenian.

The climate of the city is of the sub-continental type, with cold but not harsh winters (average temperature in January is 3.5 °C) and summers that are not excessively hot, tempered by the proximity of the sea (temperature averages at about 23.5 C in July). The average annual temperature is just below 14 °C. The Ronchi dei Legionari weather station is located in the municipal area, officially recognized by the world meteorological organization.

Air Dolomiti's executive headquarters were formerly in Ronchi dei Legionari, while the airline's registered office was in Dossobuono, Villafranca di Verona.

== Demographic evolution ==
Historical population

Year	Pop.	±%
1861	?	—
1871	?	—
1881	?	—
1901	?	—
1911	?	—
1921	4,628	—
1931	5,965	+28.9%
1936	6,668	+11.8%

Year	Pop.	±%
1951	8,563	+28.4%
1961	9,343	+9.1%
1971	10,318	+10.4%
1981	10,052	−2.6%
1991	9,900	−1.5%
2001	11,121	+12.3%
2011	11,960	+7.5%
2021	11,807	−1.3%

Source: Data from ISTAT

In 2025, the population of Ronchi dei Legionari grew from 11,862 residents in 2025 to 11,994 inhabitants registered by the Municipal Registry Office as of 31 December.

=== Ethnic groups and foreign minorities ===
As of 31 December 2025, there were 1,072 foreigners residing in the municipality, representing 8.7% of the total population. The following are the largest national groups:

1. Romania: 247
2. Albania: 105
3. Bangladesh: 87

== Languages and dialects ==
The local dialect is called Bisiàco, a Venetian language with influences from Friulian, Slovenian, and German. Slovenian is also recognized in the municipality, and some road signs are bilingual. However, according to the 1910 census, only 1% of the population was Slovenian.

== Culture ==
On 11 April 2017, Ronchi dei Legionari was awarded the title of "City that Reads."

=== Events ===
- The lighting of Epiphany bonfires, called seime, is traditionally held the day before Epiphany.
- In April, the "Librinfesta. Day of Books and Reading" event takes place.
- The municipal administration promotes the "We and History" event every year.
- In June, the Journalism Festival, promoted by the "Leali delle Notizie" cultural association, has been held since 2015.
- During the summer, the "Summer Meetings in the Library" events are held in Piazzetta Francesco Giuseppe, in the library square and in Excelsior Park. The Pro Loco organizes "Ronchi under the stars"

== Economy ==
The municipality's economic importance stems from the presence of the Friuli-Venezia Giulia Airport, with daily flights to several Italian and European cities. There are also several manufacturing activities in the two artisanal-industrial areas located to the west (refrigeration, heat exchangers, construction, etc.) and northeast (aeronautics, electronics, refrigeration) of the airport.

== Infrastructure and transport ==
The municipality is served by the SS 14 and SS 677 state roads and the former SS 305. The nearest motorway junction is Redipuglia-Monfalcone Ovest, located in the municipality of Fogliano Redipuglia and along the A4 Turin-Trieste motorway.

Ronchi is located at the intersection of the Udine-Trieste and Venice-Trieste railways. There are two railway stations open to passengers within the municipality:

- Trieste Airport station, located on the Venice-Trieste railway and serving the Friuli-Venezia Giulia Airport;
- Ronchi dei Legionari Nord station, located on the Udine-Trieste railway;

The Trieste-Ronchi dei Legionari Airport is located in the municipality.

== Twin towns – sister cities ==
Ronchi dei Legionari is twinned with:

- Metlika, Slovenia
- Wagna, Austria
