= Udine (Chamber of Deputies electoral district) =

Friuli-Venezia Giulia - 03 (Udine)
- Former electoral district for the Chamber of Deputies
- Region: Friuli-Venezia Giulia
- Major settlements: Udine

Former electoral district
- Created: 2017
- Abolished: 2020
- Party: Lega Nord FVG
- Member: Daniele Moschioni
- Elected: 2018

The Udine electoral district (official name: Friuli-Venezia Giulia - 03 uninominal district) was an uninominal district in Italy for the Chamber of Deputies.

== Territory ==
As required by law, it was part of the Friuli-Venezia Giulia electoral constituency.

The Udine-district is composed by 42 comuni: Bagnaria Arsa, Bicinicco, Buttrio, Campoformido, Carlino, Castions di Strada, Chiopris-Viscone, Cividale del Friuli, Cordovado, Corno di Rosazzo, Gonars, Latisana, Lignano Sabbiadoro, Manzano, Marano Lagunare, Moimacco, Morsano al Tagliamento, Mortegliano, Muzzana del Turgnano, Palazzolo dello Stella, Palmanova, Pavia di Udine, Pocenia, Porpetto, Pozzuolo del Friuli, Pradamano, Precenicco, Premariacco, Remanzacco, Rivignano Teor, Ronchis, San Giorgio di Nogaro, San Giovanni al Natisone, San Vito al Torre, Santa Maria la Longa, Talmassons, Tavagnacco, Torviscosa, Trivignano Udinese, Udine, Varmo and Visco.

The district was composed by a part of the province of Udine and Pordenone.

The district was part of the Friuli-Venezia Giulia - 01 plurinominal district.

== Elected ==
Election	Deputy	Party
2018	Daniele Moschioni	LNFVG

== Electoral results ==
2018 general election: Udine
Party	Candidate	Votes	%	±%
Lega Nord	Daniele Moschioni	69 594	43,40	New
Five Star Movement	Domenico Balzani	38 368	23,93	New
Democratic Party	Francesco Martines	37 274	23,25	New
Free and Equal	Chiara Casasola	4 995	3,12	New
CasaPound	Domenico Sguazzino	2 336	1,46	New

Candidates	Party	Votes	%
Daniele Moschioni	Lega Nord FVG	41 058	25,61
Daniele Moschioni	Forza Italia	18 168	11,33
Daniele Moschioni	Brothers of Italy	8 222	5,13
Daniele Moschioni	Us with Italy-UDC	2 142	1,34
Domenico Balzani	Five Star Movement	38 368	23,93
Francesco Martines	Democratic Party	30 001	18,71
Francesco Martines	More Europe	5 845	3,65
Francesco Martines	Popular Civic	741	0,46
Francesco Martines	Italy Europe Together	687	0,43
Chiara Casasola	Free and Equal	4 995	3,12
Domenico Sguazzino	CasaPound	2 336	1,46
Others	Others	7 771	4,83
