= Cjarlins Muzane SSD =

Italian football club

Cjarlins Muzane
- Full name: Cjarlins Muzane Società Sportiva Dilettantistica a responsabilità limitata
- Nicknames: Arancioblu, Aranciocelesti, CM
- Founded: 2003
- Ground: Stadio Eros Della Ricca, Carlino, Italy
- Chairman: Vincenzo Zanutta
- Manager: Mauro Zironelli
- League: Serie D Group C
- 2023–24: Serie D Group C, 15th of 18
- Website: https://www.cjarlinsmuzane.it/
Home colours	Away colours

Cjarlins Muzane Società Sportiva Dilettantistica a responsabilità limitata, or simply Cjarlins Muzane, is an Italian association football club located in Carlino, Friuli-Venezia Giulia. It currently plays in Serie D Group C.

The club was born in 2003 as US Cjarlins Muzane from the merger between AC Futura (from Carlino, red-blue colors) and SS Muzzanese (from Muzzana del Turgnano, orange color)

== History ==
The origin of Cjarlins Muzane date back to 2003, when the new club took life (and registration number 58127) from Muzzanese, which was the only team to play football in the zone after the interruption of AC Futura activity. Leading the transition is Fernando Targato, patron of SS Muzzanese who becomes the secretary (and still is today) of the club, whose command was immediately taken over by the entrepreneur Vincenzo Zanutta the owner of Zanutta S.p.a., who has always been at the helm of the orange-heavenly team ever since.
A curiosity concerns the choice of the name: initially, the newborn association could not decide, therefore, also on the inspiration of ASD Lavarian Mortean (born from the merger of Lavariano and Mortegliano), a name was adopted that would highlight the villages of Carlino and Muzzana, expressing them in Friulian.
From its foundation to today, it has been a continuous advancement of the category, given that the Cjarlins Muzane in its history has never known relegation. The first appearance is in the 2003-04 Terza Categoria Championship. The following year the club wins the tournament and flies to the Seconda Categoria. The freshman season is interlocutory, but the following year leads to the primacy and the jump to the Prima Categoria. The rule of the second year is always valid and so, after a quiet salvation, the landing in Promozione arrives through the play-offs. In this category, Cjarlins Muzane participated for three years, then win the championship - after a second place the previous year behind ASD Lignano - and fly to Eccellenza. In 2017 the promotion to Serie D arrives and the club completes the ride in the amateur leagues.

=== Seasons ===
Season	League									Cups	
Season	Division	P	W	D	L	F	A	Pts	Pos	Cup	Round
2003–04	Terza Categoria, group D	22	9	9	4	44	29	60	5th	Terza Categoria Cup	Semifinals
2004–05	Terza Categoria, group D	23	16	5	2	39	12	53	1st ↑	Terza Categoria Cup	2nd round
2005–06	Seconda Categoria, group C	30	12	13	5	41	29	49	5th	Seconda Categoria Cup	2nd round
2006–07	Seconda Categoria, group C	30	16	9	5	54	25	57	1st ↑	Seconda Categoria Cup	1st round
2007–08	Prima Categoria, group B	30	10	9	11	42	42	39	9th	Prima Categoria Cup	1st round
2008–09	Prima Categoria, group B	30	14	11	5	50	32	53	3rd ↑	Prima Categoria Cup	1st round
2009–10	Promozione, group A	30	11	11	8	36	32	44	7th	FVG Cup	1st round
2010–11	Promozione, group A	30	18	6	7	51	32	60	2nd	FVG Cup	1st round
2011–12	Promozione, group A	30	23	3	4	72	23	72	1st ↑	FVG Cup	Eighters
2012–13	Eccellenza	32	13	6	13	39	38	67	5th	FVG Cup	Semifinals
2013–14	Eccellenza	30	10	9	11	38	38	39	7th	FVG Cup	Semifinals
2014–15	Eccellenza	30	18	6	6	52	29	60	2nd	FVG Cup	1st round
2015–16	Eccellenza	30	15	8	7	54	34	53	3rd	FVG Cup	1st round
2016–17	Eccellenza	30	18	9	3	61	28	63	1st ↑	FVG Cup	Runners-up
2017–18	Serie D, group C	34	10	14	10	51	49	41	11th	Serie D Cup	Preliminary round
2018–19	Serie D, group C	34	12	10	12	63	55	46	7th	Serie D Cup	1st round
2019–20	Serie D, group C	28	8	12	6	10	44	47	9th	Serie D Cup	Interrupted
2020–21	Serie D, group C	38	13	13	12	60	60	52	10th	Serie D Cup	1st round
Source: Messaggero Veneto – Giornale del Friuli

=== Key ===
1st	2nd	↑	↓
Champions	Runners-up	Promoted	Relegated

== Honours ==
- Eccellenza Friuli-Venezia Giulia (1st regional level)

Winners: 2016–17

- Promozione Friuli-Venezia Giulia (2nd regional level)

Winners: 2011–12

- Seconda Categoria Friuli-Venezia Giulia (4th regional level)

Winners: 2006–07

- Terza Categoria Friuli-Venezia Giulia (lowest regional level)

Winners: 2004–05

- Coppa Italia Dilettanti Friuli-Venezia Giulia

Runners-up: 2016–17

== Colors and badge ==
The team's colors are orange and light blue.
