= Teor =

- Comune
- Comune di Teor
- Location within Italy Location within Friuli-Venezia Giulia
- Coordinates: 45°51′N 13°3′E
- Country: Italy
- Region: Friuli-Venezia Giulia
- Province: Province of Udine (UD)

Area
  - Total: 16.9 km^{2} (6.5 sq mi)
- Elevation: 12 m (39 ft)

Population (Dec. 2004)
  - Total: 2,020
  - Density: 120/km^{2} (310/sq mi)
- Time zone: UTC+1 (CET)
  - Summer (DST): UTC+2 (CEST)
- Postal code: 33050
- Dialing code: 0432
- Website: Official website

Teor was a comune (municipality) in the Province of Udine in the Italian region Friuli-Venezia Giulia, located about 60 kilometres (37 mi) northwest of Trieste and about 30 kilometres (19 mi) southwest of Udine. As of 31 December 2004, it had a population of 2,020 and an area of 16.9 square kilometres (6.5 mi^{2}).

Teor bordered the following municipalities: Palazzolo dello Stella, Pocenia, Rivignano, Ronchis.

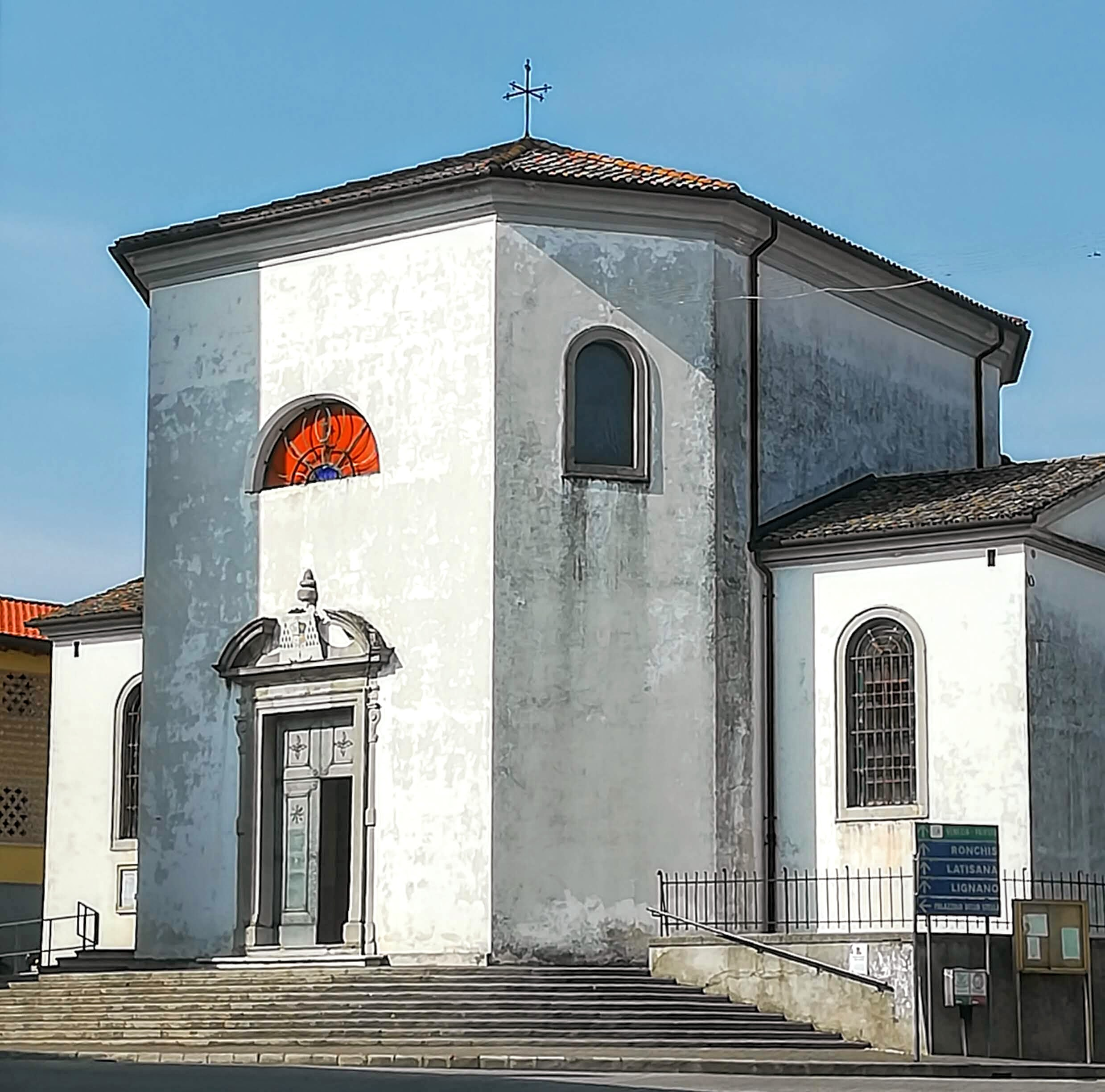
A parish, Chiesa di San Mauro, in Teor

Since January 1, 2014 Teor has been merged with Rivignano, forming a new municipality called Rivignano Teor.

== Demographic evolution ==
Historical population

Year	Pop.	±%
1861	?	—
1871	2,248	—
1881	2,294	+2.0%
1901	2,817	+22.8%
1911	3,325	+18.0%

Year	Pop.	±%
1921	3,552	+6.8%
1931	3,532	−0.6%
1936	3,247	−8.1%
1951	3,220	−0.8%
1961	2,657	−17.5%

Year	Pop.	±%
1971	2,136	−19.6%
1981	2,066	−3.3%
1991	1,954	−5.4%
2001	1,996	+2.1%

Source: Data from ISTAT

== Notable people ==
- Birthplace of 1982 FIFA World Cup champion Fulvio Collovati.
