= Valle Canal Novo =

Nature reserve in Italy

Valle Canal Novo is a nature reserve near Marano, a small town in the north east of Italy. Consisting primarily of a lagoon (or valle), which was historically used for fishing, it is 121 hectares in size and in the same protected area as the Foci dello Stella.
