= Cargnacco =

Cargnacco Cjargnà (Friulian)
- Frazione
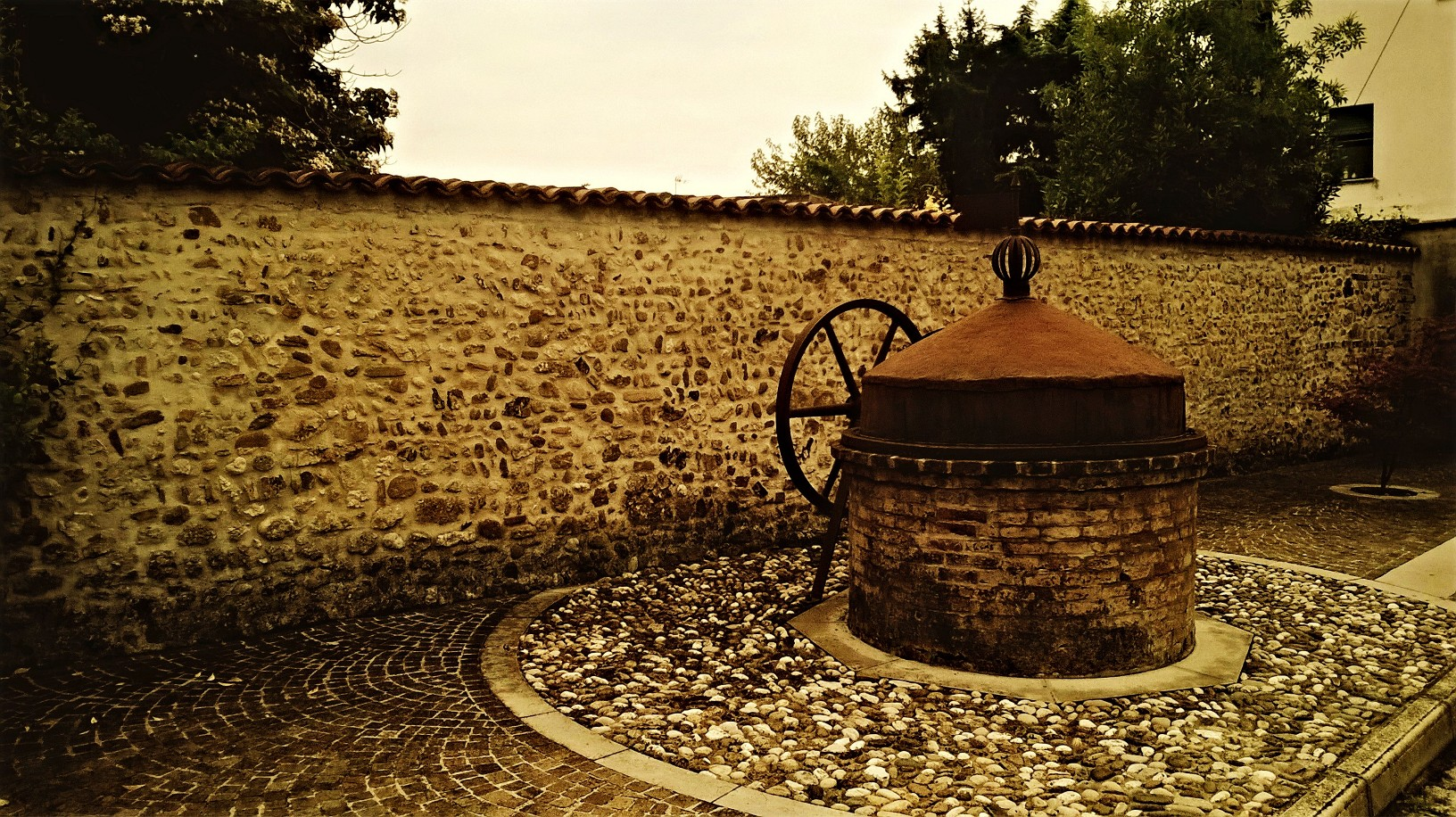
- Old well, Cargnacco

- Location of Cargnacco in Italy
- Coordinates: 46°0.24′N 13°14.1′E
- Country: Italy
- Region: Friuli-Venezia Giulia
- Province: Udine
- Comune: Pozzuolo del Friuli

Area
  - Total: 1.5 km^{2} (0.58 sq mi)

Population (2011)
  - Total: 900
  - Density: 600/km^{2} (1,600/sq mi)
- Time zone: UTC+1 (CET)
  - Summer (DST): UTC+2 (CEST)
- Dialing code: 0432

Cargnacco (Italian pronunciation: [karˈɲakko]; Friulian: Cjargnà Friulian pronunciation: [carˈɲa]) is a hamlet in the municipality of Pozzuolo del Friuli.

== Geography ==
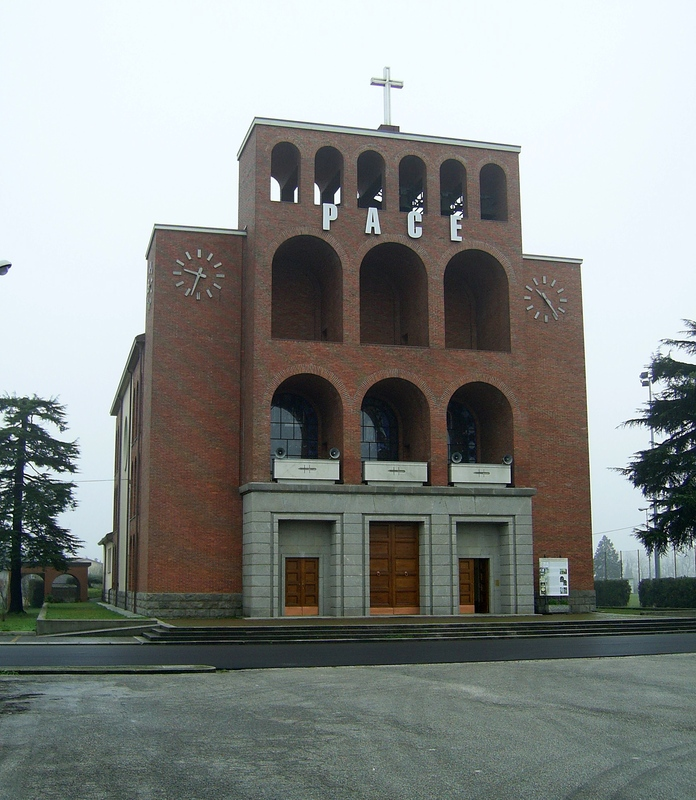
National temple "Madonna del Conforto" in Cargnacco

Cargnacco located in the Venetian-Friulan Plain, about 5 kilometres (3.1 miles) northeast of the administrative centre of Pozzuolo del Friuli, 10 kilometres (6.2 miles) south of Udine (capital of the province), 77 kilometres (48 miles) northwest of Trieste (capital of the region Friuli-Venezia Giulia), 120 kilometres (75 miles) northeast of Venice, and 645 kilometres (401 miles) northeast of Rome (capital of Italy). Cargnacco develops through four main roads from Piazza IV Novembre. Towards east, Via Manzoni passes by the old elementary school and the rectory. The latter is located close to the old church (now deconsecrated) and the local playground. Via Manzoni crosses Via Leonardo da Vinci at the main square, where the national temple "Madonna del Conforto" is located, which is dedicated to the soldiers who died at the Eastern Front (World War II). Via Buttrio also leaves Piazza IV Novembre towards east, passing by the old well, and crossing Via Leonardo da Vinci at the old country residence of the count Della Torre of Villalta, commonly referred to as “Palačat” (from “palač”, which stands for "palace" in Friulian language). Via Buttrio continues towards the Z.I.U. industrial area (also known as Casa Tosolini), whereas Via Leonardo da Vinici continues towards Lumignacco (hamlet in the municipality of Pavia di Udine), passing by the Romanello sport centre and the village's celebrations ground. Two more roads start from Piazza IV Novembre. Via Dante Alighieri leads briefly towards south, and then to the graveyard. Via Galileo Galilei leads towards west and then north, branching into Via San Giorgio, which leads to the flyover over the A23 highway and Terenzano, and Via Giosuè Carducci, which leads to the Casa Rossa crossroad (located in Terenzano), where Via Giuseppe Verdi, Via Tomba Antica, and county road 94 meet.

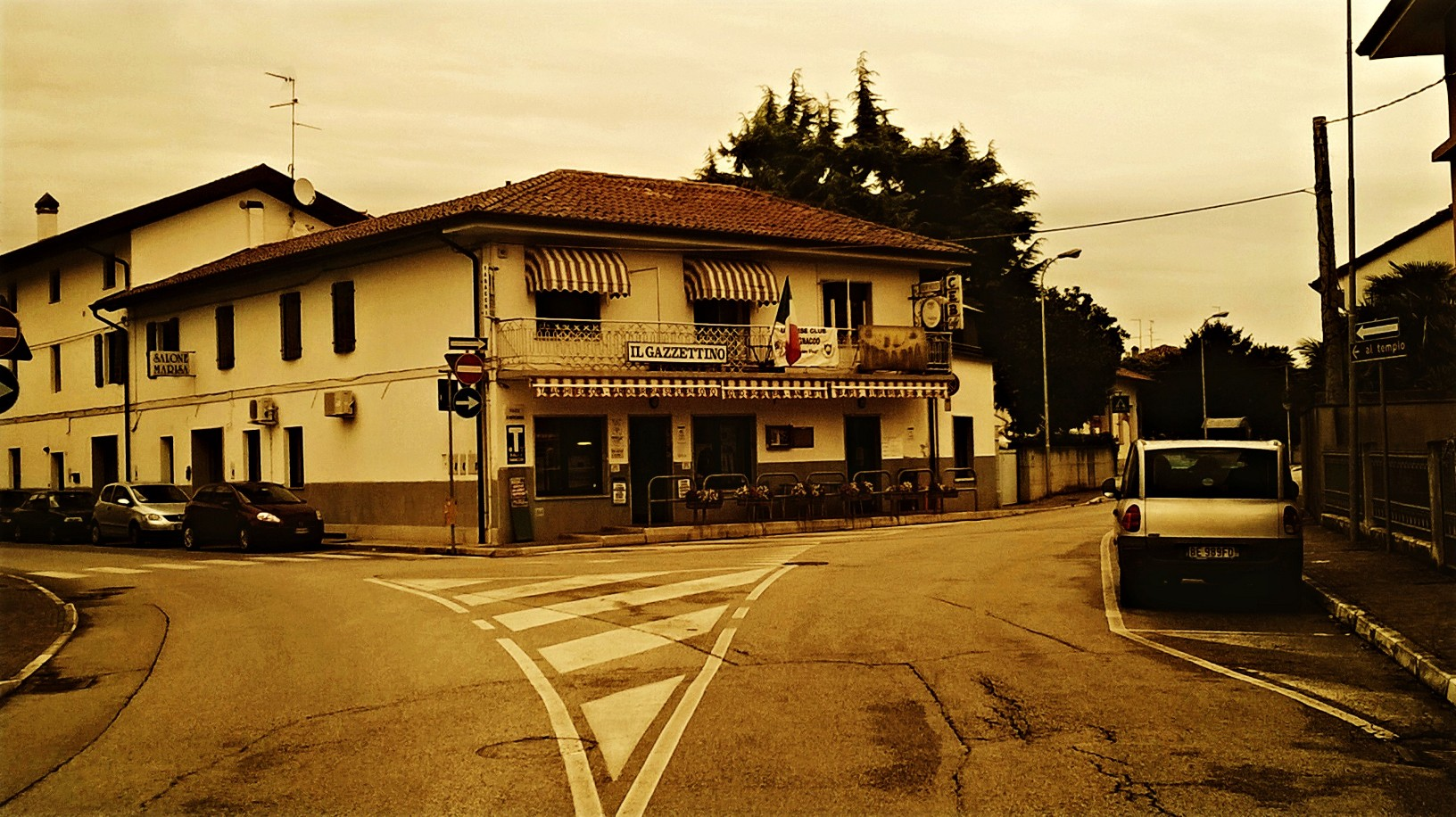
Piazza IV Novembre, Cargnacco

== Economy ==
Cargnacco hosts part of the Z.I.U (Zonaa Industriale Udinese) industrial area at the far east end of Via Buttrio. The Z.I.U. is under the authority of the Consorzio per lo sviluppo Industriale del Friuli Centrale (the consortium for the industrial development of central Friuli), and includes the two major industries of the municipality: the Acciaierie Bertoli Safau (ABS), with over a thousand employee and a sales volume of 686 million euros per annum, and the Rizzani de Eccher group, with over a thousand employee and a sales volume over 500 million euros per annum.
