= Friuli-Venezia Giulia (electoral constituency) =

Friuli-Venezia Giulia is a constituency (Italian: Circoscrizione) for the Chamber of Deputies and the Senate. It elects 13 members and 7 members, with the Rosatellum, via proportionality and first-past-the-post. Its territory is the region Friuli-Venezia Giulia.

== Chamber of Deputies ==
Friuli-Venezia Giulia
- Constituency for the Chamber of Deputies
- Region: Friuli-Venezia Giulia
- Population: 1 197 392
- Major settlements: Trieste; Udine; Pordenone; Gorizia
- Area: 7 924,36 km^{2}

Current constituency
- Created: 1994
- Seats: 13 (1994-2020); 8 (since 2020)

=== 2018 ===
==== General results (Proportional+FPTP) ====
Coalition	Party	Votes	%	Seats	
Coalition	Party	Votes	%	Prop.	FPTP
Centre-right	League	177 402	25,47	2	
Centre-right	Forza Italia	73 401	10,65	1	
Centre-right	Brothers of Italy	36 714	5,33	1	
Centre-right	Us with Italy–UDC	8 706	1,26	-	
Centre-right	Total (coalition)	296 223	42,98	4	5
Five Star Movement		169 496	24,59	2	-
Centre-left	Democratic Party	128 689	18,67	2	
Centre-left	More Europe	23 456	3,40	-	
Centre-left	Together	3 927	0,57	-	
Centre-left	Popular Civic List	2 975	0,43	-	
Centre-left	Total (coalition)	159 047	23,07	2	-
Free and Equal		22 097	3,21	-	-
CasaPound		8 778	1,27	-	-
Pact for Autonomy		7 080	1,03	-	-
Power to the People!		5 934	0,86	-	-
Others		20 625	3,00	-	-
Total		689 280	100,00	8	5

==== First-past-the-post results ====
Elected in the Centre-right coalition

Uninominal district	Elected	Party
1. Trieste	Renzo Tondo	NcI
2. Gorizia	Guido Germano Pettarin	FI
3. Udine	Daniele Moschioni	LSP
4. Codroipo	Sandra Savino	FI
5. Pordenone	Vannia Gava	LSP

==== Proportional results ====
Plurinominal district	League	Five Star Movement	Democratic Party	Forza Italia	Brothers of Italy
Friuli-Venezia Giulia - 01	Massimiliano Fedriga; Massimiliano Panizzut	Sabrina De Carlo; Luca Sut	Ettore Rosato; Debora Serracchiani	Roberto Novelli	Walter Rizzetto

=== 2022 ===
==== General results (Proportional+FPTP) ====
Coalition	Party	Votes	%	Seats	
Coalition	Party	Votes	%	Prop.	FPTP
Centre-right	Brothers of Italy				
Centre-right	League				
Centre-right	Forza Italia				
Centre-right	Us Moderates				
Centre-right	Total (coalition)				
Centre-left	Democratic Party				
Centre-left	Greens and Left Alliance				
Centre-left	More Europe				
Centre-left	Civic Commitment				
Centre-left	Total (coalition)				
Five Star Movement					
Action/Italia Viva					
Italexit					
Others					
Total				5	3

==== First-past-the-post results ====
Uninominal district	Elected	Party
1. Pordenone		
2. Udine		
3. Trieste		

==== Proportional results ====
Plurinominal district	Brothers of Italy	Democratic Party	League	Five Star Movement
Friuli-Venezia Giulia - 01				

== Senate ==
Friuli-Venezia Giulia
- Electoral district constituency for the Senate
- Region: Friuli-Venezia Giulia
- Population: 1 197 392
- Major settlements: Trieste; Udine; Pordenone; Gorizia
- Area: 7 924,36 km^{2}

Current constituency
- Created: 1948
- Seats: 6 (1948-1963) 7 (1963-2020) 4 (since 2020)

=== 2018 ===
==== General results (Proportional+FPTP) ====
Coalition	Party	Votes	%	Seats	
Coalition	Party	Votes	%	Prop.	FPTP
Centre-right	League	164 105	25,49	2	
Centre-right	Forza Italia	76 114	11,82	1	
Centre-right	Brothers of Italy	35 032	5,44	-	
Centre-right	Us with Italy–UDC	6 391	0,99	-	
Centre-right	Total (coalition)	281 642	43,76	3	2
Five Star Movement		156 251	24,27	1	-
Centre-left	Democratic Party	128 713	19,99	1	
Centre-left	More Europe	19 814	3,08	-	
Centre-left	Together	2 942	0,46	-	
Centre-left	Popular Civic List	2 473	0,38	-	
Centre-left	Total (coalition)	153 942	23,92	1	-
Free and Equal		18 815	2,92	-	-
CasaPound		7 810	1,21	-	-
Power to the People!		5 117	0,79	-	-
Pact for Autonomy		5 015	0,78	-	-
Others		15 060	2,34	-	-
Total		643 679	100,00	5	2

==== First-past-the-post results ====
Elected in the Centre-right coalition

Uninominal district	Elected	Party
1. Trieste	Laura Stabile	FI
2. Udine	Luca Ciriani	FdI

==== Proportional results ====
Plurinominal district	League	Five Star Movement	Democratic Party	Forza Italia
Friuli-Venezia Giulia - 01	Mario Pittoni; Raffaella Fiormaria Marin	Stefano Patuanelli	Tatiana Rojc	Franco Dal Mas

=== 2022 ===
==== General results (Proportional+FPTP) ====
Coalition	Party	Votes	%	Seats	
Coalition	Party	Votes	%	Prop.	FPTP
Centre-right	Brothers of Italy				
Centre-right	League				
Centre-right	Forza Italia				
Centre-right	Us Moderates				
Centre-right	Total (coalition)				
Centre-left	Democratic Party				
Centre-left	Greens and Left Alliance				
Centre-left	More Europe				
Centre-left	Civic Commitment				
Centre-left	Total (coalition)				
Five Star Movement					
Action/Italia Viva					
Italexit					
Others					
Total				3	1

==== First-past-the-post results ====
Uninominal district	Elected	Party
1. Trieste		

==== Proportional results ====
Plurinominal district	Brothers of Italy	Democratic Party	League
Friuli-Venezia Giulia - 01			
