= Ugo Anzile =

French cyclist

Personal information
- Born: 2 February 1931 Pocenia, Italy
- Died: 25 April 2010 (aged 79) Metz, France

Cycling career
- Sport: Cycling
- Role: Rider

Ugo Anzile (2 February 1931 – 25 April 2010) was a professional racing cyclist. He was born in Italy, where he obtained French nationality in 1954. He rode in four editions of the Tour de France. His brother Guido Anzile and uncle Gino Sciardis were also cyclists.
