= Gino Sciardis =

French cyclist

Personal information
- Full name: Gino Sciardis
- Born: 28 January 1917 Pocenia, Italy
- Died: 9 January 1968 (aged 50) Bondy, France

Cycling career
- Sport: Cycling
- Discipline: Road
- Role: Rider

Major wins
- 2 stages Tour de France

Gino Sciardis (28 January 1917 – 9 January 1968) was a professional road bicycle racer, born Italian, later naturalized French. He rode in the 1948, 1949, and 1950 Tour de France. He finished in fifth place in the 1950 Paris–Roubaix.

His nephews Guido Anzile and Ugo Anzile were also cyclists.

== Biography ==
Sciardis was born in Italy, but when he was 13 years old he moved to Bondy, France.

In 1948, Sciardis rode the Tour de France as member of the international team, and won the eleventh stage. In the fifteenth stage, he was caught holding on to a car, and the jury disqualified him.

In 1950, Sciardis had changed his nationality, becoming French, and he rode the Tour de France as member of a French regional team.

== Major results ==
1937
Nantes – Les Sables d'Olonne
Circuit de l'Indre
1947
Circuit des cols Pyrénéens
1948
Tour de France:

Winner stage 11

1950
Tour de France:

Winner stage 21

1951
GP du Pneumatique
