= Guido Anzile =

Italian-French cyclist (1928–2022)

Personal information
- Born: 26 September 1928 Pocenia, Italy
- Died: 4 March 2022 (aged 93) Metz, France

Cycling career
- Sport: Cycling
- Discipline: Road
- Role: Rider

Amateur teams
- 1949: Fontenay-sous-Bois Sportif
- 1951: Pédale Mosellane
- 1962: Pédale Mosellane

Professional teams
- 1952–1954: Peugeot–Dunlop
- 1955–1956: Mercier–BP–Hutchinson
- 1956: Alcyon–Dunlop
- 1958: Peugeot–BP–Dunlop

Guido Anzile (26 September 1928 – 4 March 2022) was an Italian-born French cyclist. He was the brother of fellow cyclist Ugo Anzile and the nephew of Gino Sciardis. Anzile died on 4 March 2022, at the age of 93.

== Major results ==
1954
3rd Overall Circuit des Ardennes
1955
3rd Genoa–Nice
1956
1st Stage 3 Circuit de Lorraine
1958
2nd Overall Circuit de Lorraine
2nd Overall Circuit des Ardennes
1961
3rd Grand Prix de la ville de Nogent-sur-Oise (1961)
1962
1st Overall Circuit de Lorraine
1st Stages 1 & 3
