= Fulvio Collovati =

Italian footballer

Personal information
- Date of birth: 9 May 1957 (age 69)
- Place of birth: Teor, Italy
- Height: 1.82 m (6 ft 0 in)
- Position: Centre-back

Senior career*
Years	Team	Apps	(Gls)
1976–1982	A.C. Milan	158	(4)
1982–1986	Internazionale	109	(3)
1986–1987	Udinese	20	(2)
1987–1989	Roma	45	(1)
1989–1993	Genoa	72	(0)
Total		404	(10)

International career
1976–1978	Italy U-21	7	(0)
1979	Italy Olympic	1	(0)
1979–1986	Italy	50	(3)
Medal record
Representing Italy
FIFA World Cup
Winner	1982 Spain
- * Club domestic league appearances and goals

Fulvio Collovati (Italian pronunciation: [ˈfulvjo kolloˈvaːti]; born 9 May 1957) is an Italian former professional footballer who played as a defender. He was a stopper (a man–marking centre-back in Italian football jargon) and also played for Italy at the international level, winning the 1982 FIFA World Cup. As a player, he was regarded as one of Italy's best defenders during the 1970s and 1980s. An elegant, physically strong, and dynamic player, he was gifted with good technique and distribution, as well as excellent anticipation, movement, marking ability, heading, and aerial prowess; because of his many defensive attributes, he was considered Roberto Rosato's heir at Milan.

== Club career ==
Collovati was born in Teor, in the province of Udine. Brought up through the A.C. Milan youth academy, he debuted in Serie A with the rossoneri in the 1976–77 season, in which he played eleven times and even won the Coppa Italia. In the next season, he played more regularly (25 appearances, 1 goal) but his definitive moment came during the 1978–79 season in which, thanks to his 27 appearances, he won the scudetto. Following the 1979–80 season, Milan was relegated to the Serie B for their involvement in the Totonero football betting scandal. Unlike other players, Collovati stayed on with Milan in 1980–81 Serie B and played 36 games scoring two goals, winning the league title that season, and helping the club to regain promotion to Serie A the following season. Back in Serie A the next season, Milan won the Mitropa Cup with Collovati serving as the team's captain: however, Milan was relegated to Serie B once again, but this time for their on-field exploits. On this occasion, Collovati (who in the meantime was called up to the Nazionale) decided to join local rivals Inter Milan.

In his first year with the nerazzurri (1982–83), he played in 28 games. At Inter, he was always a mainstay in the defence, but in September 1986, he wanted to be closer to his hometown of Udine, and he went to play for Udinese Calcio, where he only stayed for one season (20 games, 2 goals). He ended his career after two years at A.S. Roma (1987–88 and 1988–89) and four at Genoa C.F.C. (from 1989–90 to 1992–93), all in Serie A.

== International career ==
In his international career, Collovati played 50 games and scored 3 goals: he made his senior debut for Italy on 24 February 1979 against the Netherlands (3–0) and he scored his first international goal on 16 February 1980 during Italy–Romania (2–1). Collovati was a member of the Italy squad that finished in fourth place at the 1980 European Championships on home soil, missing the decisive penalty in the shoot-out of the bronze-medal match against Czechoslovakia. Collovati represented his country in 8 FIFA World Cup qualification matches and was a protagonist at the 1982 World Cup in Spain where Italy won the World Cup for a third time, and Collovati was named as a member of the team of the tournament. He also made an appearance for Italy at the 1986 World Cup.

== After retirement ==
He is now an analyst for the Italian media station RAI.

== Personal life ==
Collovati is married to Caterina Cimmino and has two daughters. He considers himself Roman Catholic.

== Honours ==
A.C. Milan

- Serie A: 1978–79
- Mitropa Cup: 1982
- Coppa Italia: 1976–77
- Serie B: 1980–81

Italy

- FIFA World Cup: 1982

Individual

- Sport Ideal European XI: 1980
- FIFA World Cup All-star Team: 1982
