= Talmassons =

- Comune
- Comune di Talmassons
- Location within Italy Location within Friuli-Venezia Giulia
- Coordinates: 45°56′N 13°7′E
- Country: Italy
- Region: Friuli-Venezia Giulia
- Province: Udine (UD)
- Frazioni: Flambro, Flumignano, Sant'Andrat

Government
  - Mayor: Fabrizio Pitton

Area
  - Total: 43.0 km^{2} (16.6 sq mi)
- Elevation: 30 m (98 ft)

Population (31 January 2016)
  - Total: 4,044
  - Density: 94.0/km^{2} (244/sq mi)
- Demonym: Talmassonesi
- Time zone: UTC+1 (CET)
  - Summer (DST): UTC+2 (CEST)
- Postal code: 33030
- Dialing code: 0432
- Website: Official website

Talmassons is a comune (municipality) in the Regional decentralization entity of Udine in the Italian region of Friuli-Venezia Giulia, located about 60 kilometres (37 mi) northwest of Trieste and about 15 kilometres (9 mi) southwest of Udine.

Talmassons borders the following municipalities: Bertiolo, Castions di Strada, Lestizza, Mortegliano, Pocenia, Rivignano Teor.
