= Precenicco =

Precenicco Prissinins (Friulian)
- Comune
- Comune di Precenicco
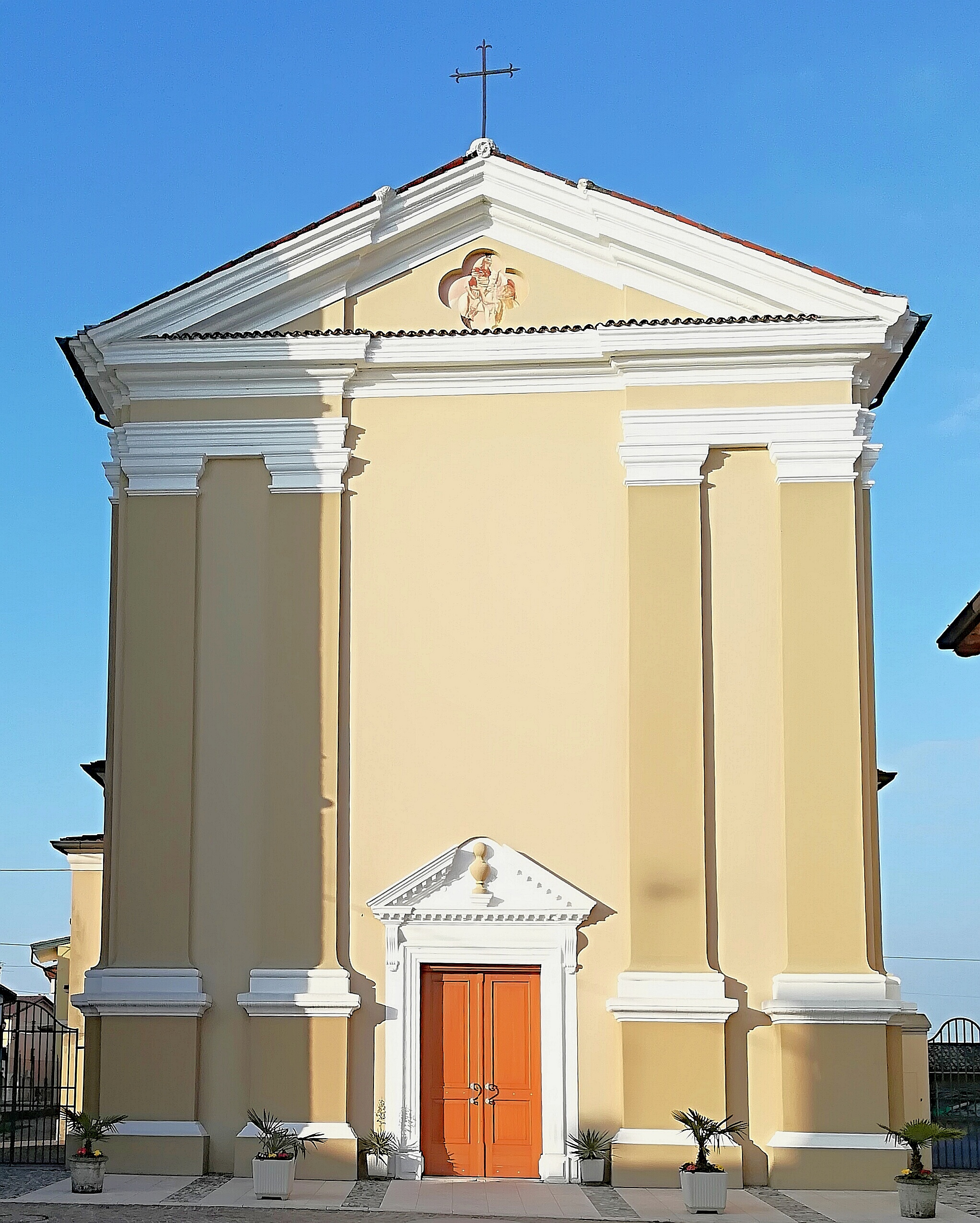
- Precenicco - parish church

- Map of comune of Precenicco

- Location within Italy Location within Friuli-Venezia Giulia
- Coordinates: 45°48′N 13°5′E
- Country: Italy
- Region: Friuli-Venezia Giulia
- Province: Udine (UD)
- Frazioni: Titiano

Government
  - Mayor: Andrea De Nicolò (lista civica)

Area
  - Total: 26.9 km^{2} (10.4 sq mi)
- Elevation: 5 m (16 ft)

Population (31 July 2025)
  - Total: 1,463
  - Density: 54.4/km^{2} (141/sq mi)
- Demonym: Precenicchesi
- Time zone: UTC+1 (CET)
  - Summer (DST): UTC+2 (CEST)
- Postal code: 33050
- Dialing code: 0431
- Website: Official website

Precenicco (Friulian: Prissinins) is a comune (municipality) in the Regional decentralization entity of Udine in the Italian region of Friuli-Venezia Giulia, located about 60 kilometres (37 mi) northwest of Trieste and about 30 kilometres (19 mi) southwest of Udine. As of 31 July 2025, it had a population of 1,463 and an area of 26.9 square kilometres (10.4 mi^{2}). The municipality of Precenicco contains the frazione (borough) of Titiano.

Precenicco borders the following municipalities: Latisana, Marano Lagunare, Palazzolo dello Stella.

== Monuments and places of interest ==
=== Religious architecture ===
- Church of San Martino di Precenicco: the current parish church was built in the 17th century, between the extinction of the Teutonic Knights' command and the beginning of Jesuit rule (1623).

=== Natural areas ===
- Stella River Mouth Nature Reserve: one of the most characteristic environments of the regional lagoon area is the Foci dello Stella Regional Nature Reserve, an area of notable naturalistic value.

== Demographic evolution ==
Historical population

Year	Pop.	±%
1861	?	—
1871	1,350	—
1881	1,304	−3.4%
1901	1,506	+15.5%
1911	1,831	+21.6%
1921	1,722	−6.0%

Year	Pop.	±%
1931	2,180	+26.6%
1936	2,300	+5.5%
1951	2,585	+12.4%
1961	2,108	−18.5%
1971	1,708	−19.0%
1981	1,695	−0.8%

Year	Pop.	±%
1991	1,585	−6.5%
2001	1,508	−4.9%
2011	1,484	−1.6%
2021	1,433	−3.4%

Source: Data from ISTAT

== Twin towns – sister cities ==
Percenicco is twinned with:

- Město Albrechtice, Czech Republic.

== Image gallery ==
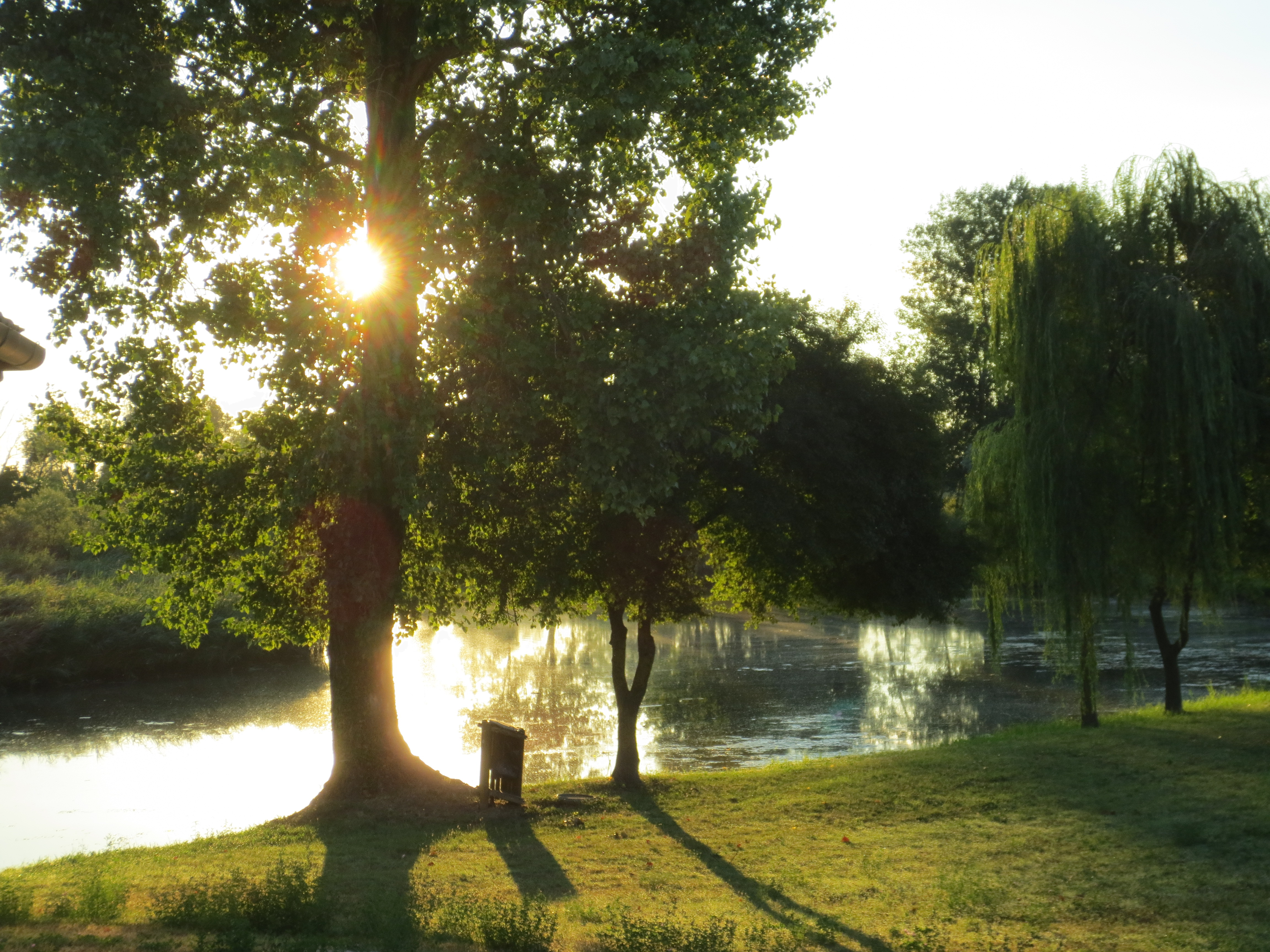
Summer sunrise on the Stella River in Titiano - panoramic view

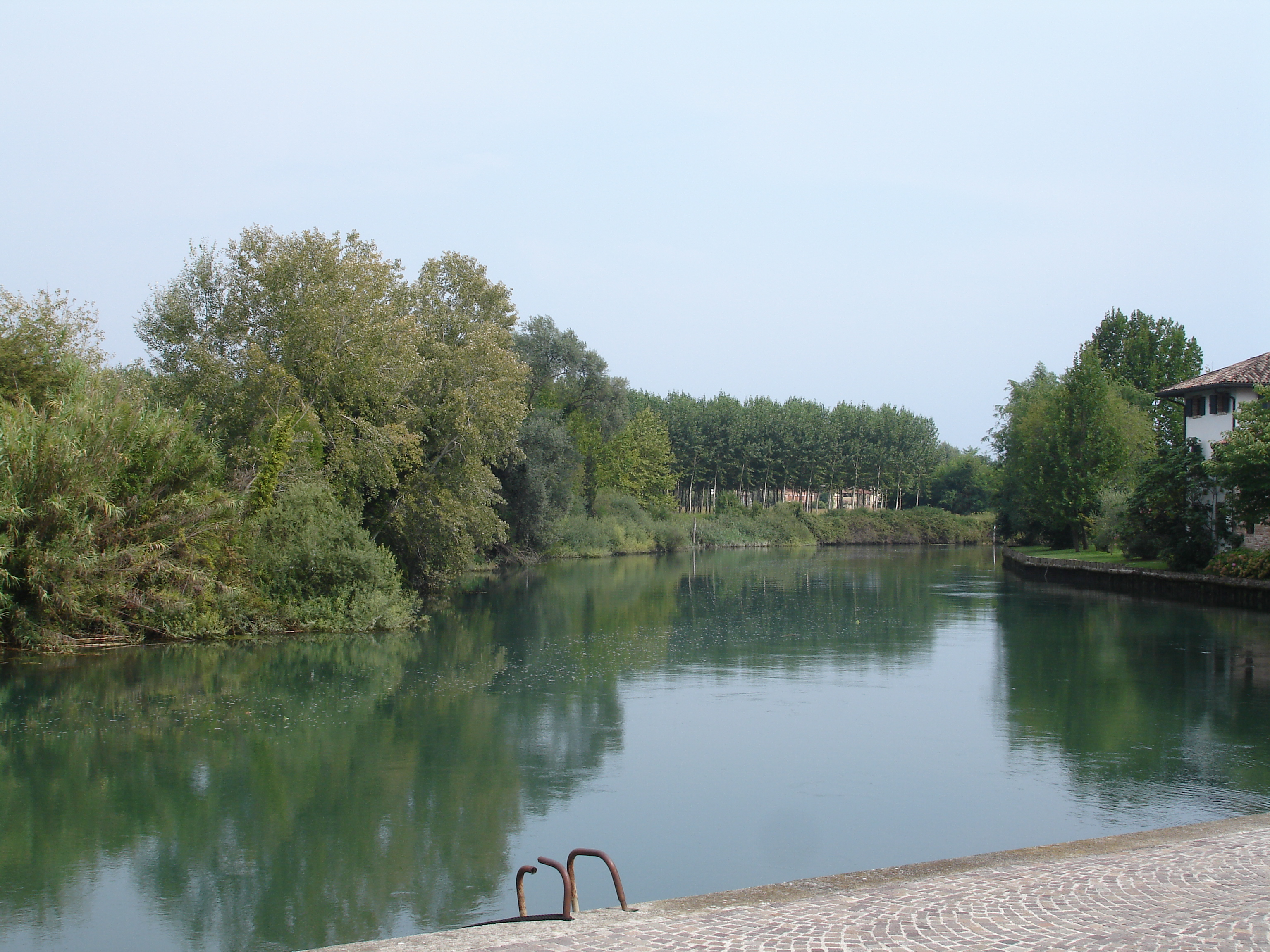
Stella River

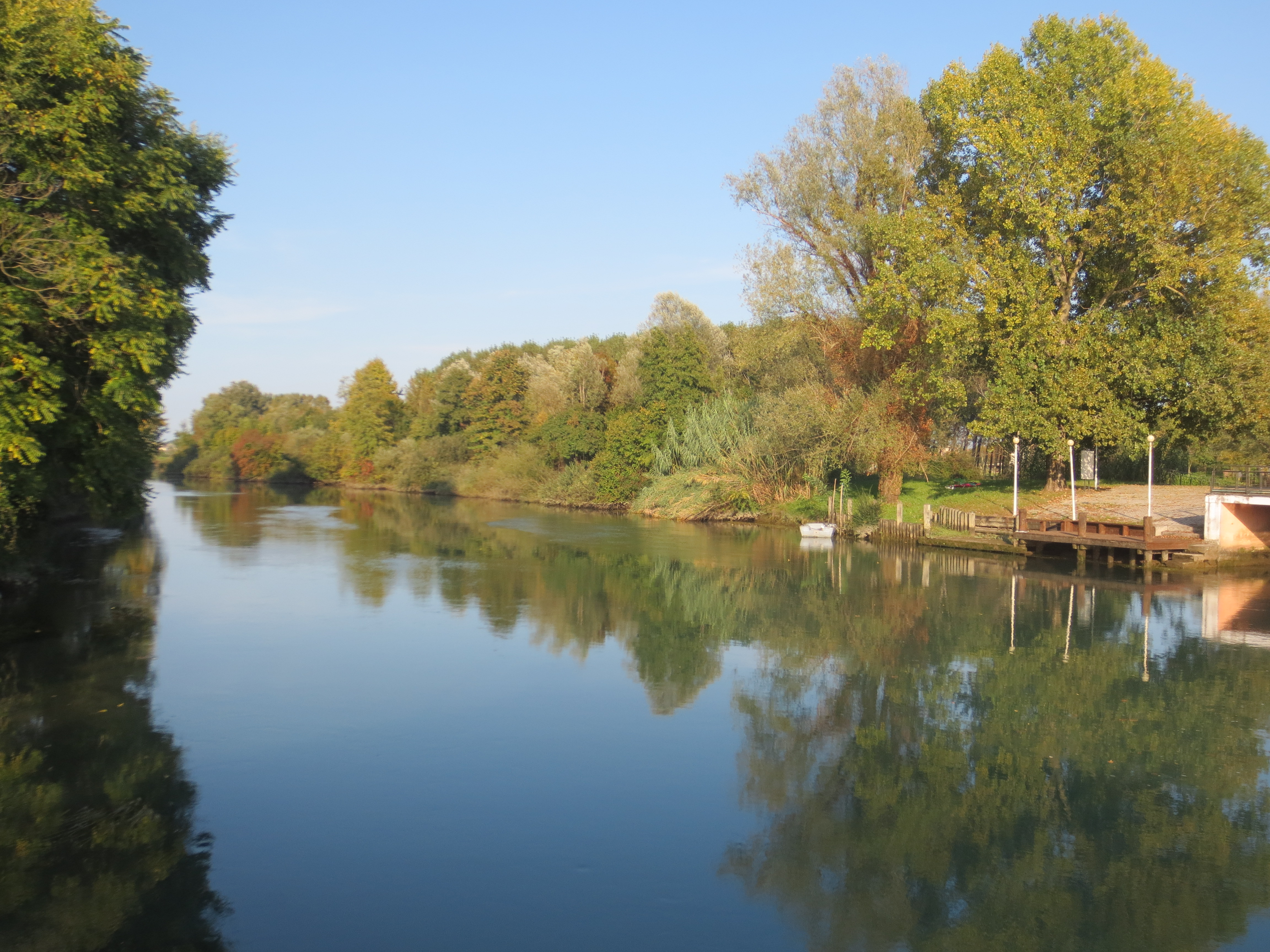
Precenicco, the Stella River - panorama
