= Chiasiellis =

Hamlet in Friuli-Venezia Giulia, Italy

Coordinates: 45°56′29.50″N 13°12′27.40″E

Chiasiellis (Friulian: Cjasielis, German: Katzelsdorf), sometimes Chiasiellis di Mortegliano (Cjasielis di Mortean) or Chiasellis, is a hamlet in the Friuli-Venezia Giulia region of north east Italy. It is a frazioni of the comune of Mortegliano in the province of Udine. It lies to the east of the main village of Mortegliano and has around 500 inhabitants.

The name of the village comes from a Friulian word meaning "boxes" which described the small houses of local farmers and shepherds. It was first mentioned around AD 1100 as a possession of the nuns of St. Mary of Aquileia.

A notable landmark of the village is the Chiesa Santa Maria Annunziata and the Golf Club Friuli is located south of the village on the via Morsano.

The hamlet is home to the women's Chiasiellis Calcio football club, a team that made it to the Serie A finals in 2008. The team also participates in Italian championship beach soccer and, in 2007, won the national title.
