= Mortegliano Cathedral =

Cathedral in Friuli-Venezia Giulia, Italy

Coordinates: 45°56′38″N 13°10′17″E

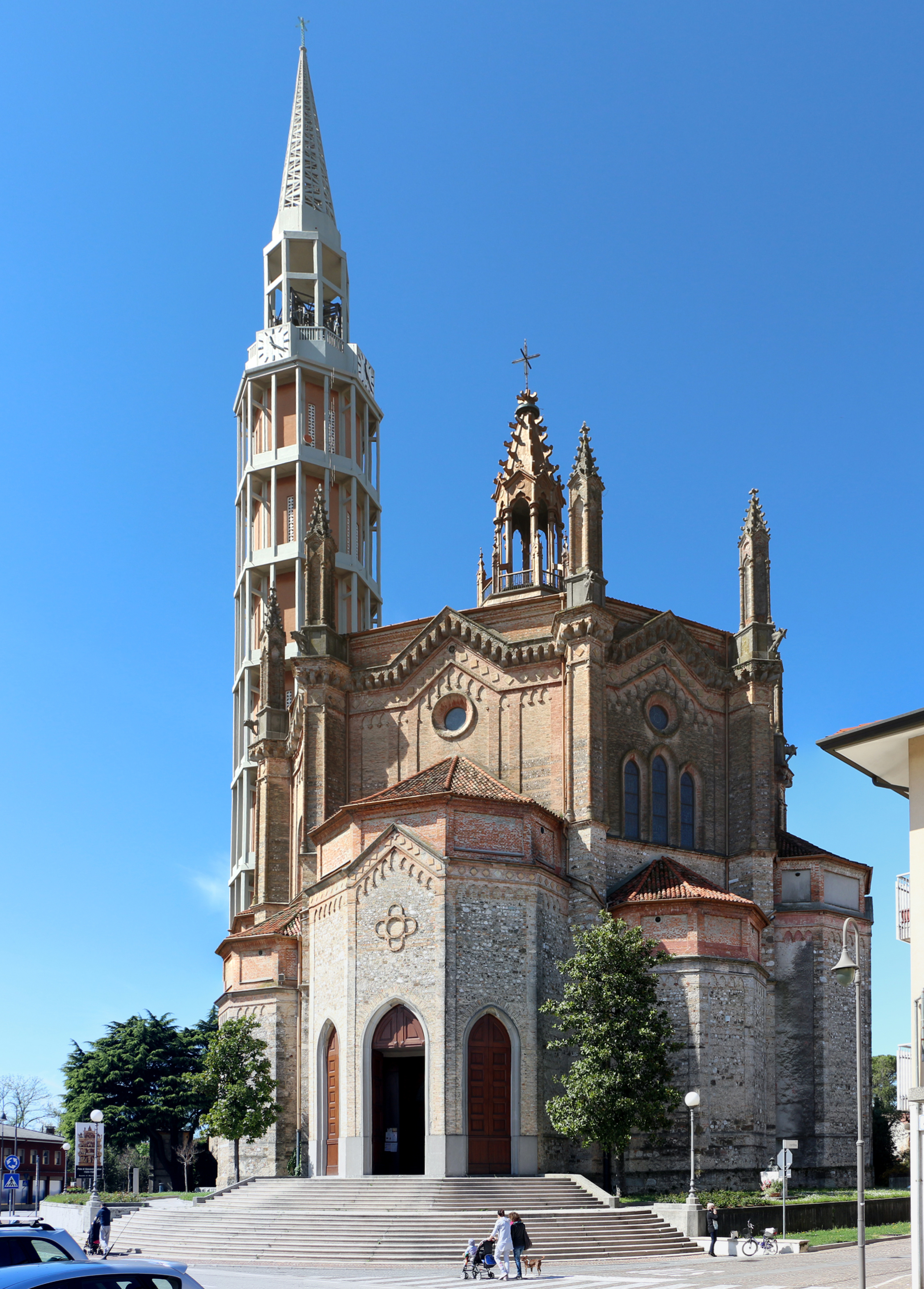

The Mortegliano Cathedral (Italian: Duomo di Mortegliano, Friulian: Domo di Mortean), is the main place of worship of the parish of the Holy Trinity of Mortegliano, in the province and archdiocese of Udine; it is part of the deanery of Central Friuli. It stands in the center of the town, in correspondence with the ancient curtain wall.
