= Marano Lagunare =

Marano Lagunare Maran (Friulian)
- Comune
- Comune di Marano Lagunare
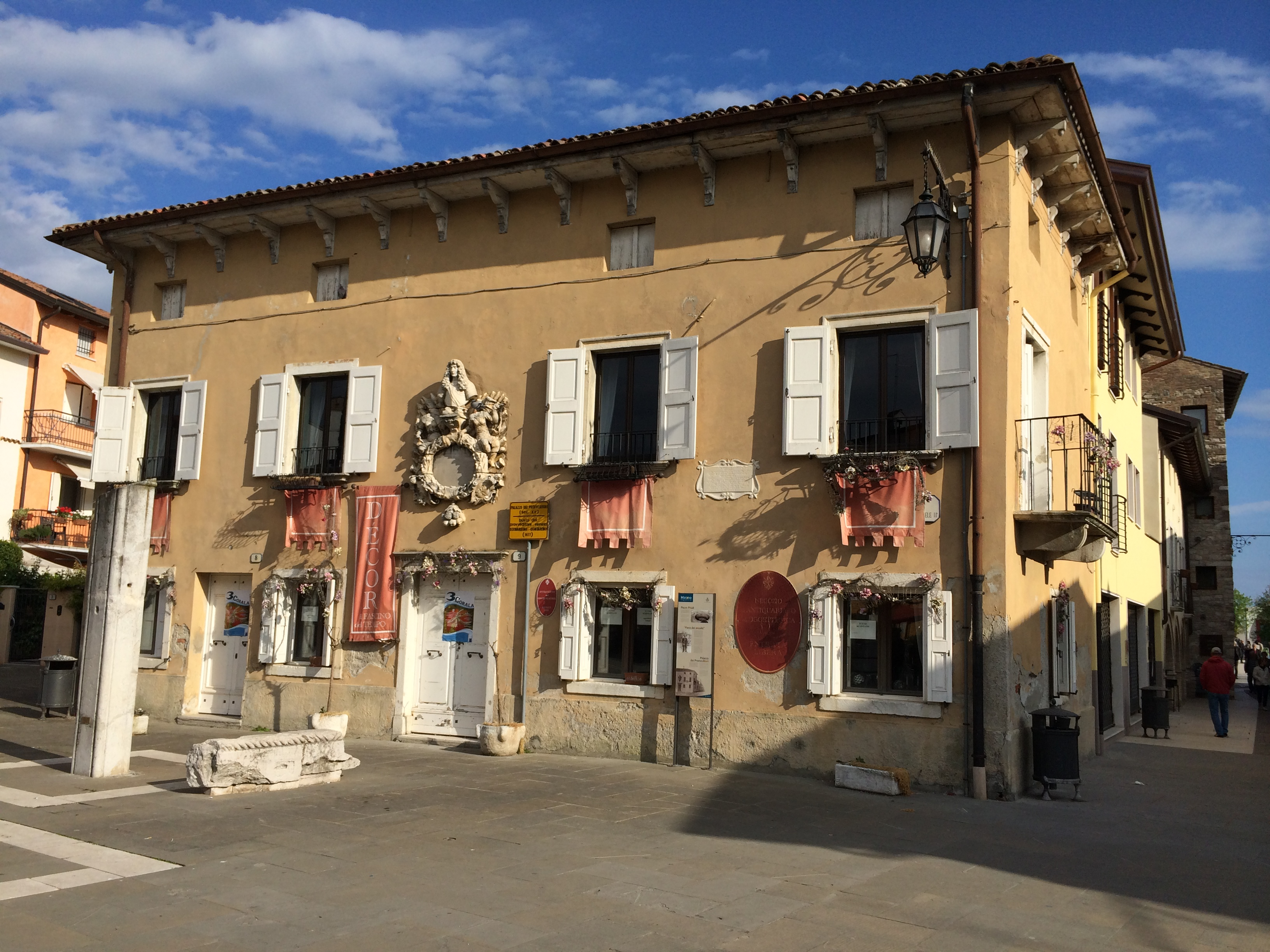
- Provveditori Palace

- Location within Italy Location within Friuli-Venezia Giulia
- Coordinates: 45°46′N 13°10′E
- Country: Italy
- Region: Friuli-Venezia Giulia
- Province: Udine (UD)

Government
  - Mayor: Devis Formentin

Area
  - Total: 85.8 km^{2} (33.1 sq mi)
- Elevation: 2 m (6.6 ft)

Population (82 February 2017)
  - Total: 1,827
  - Density: 21.3/km^{2} (55.2/sq mi)
- Demonym: Maranesi
- Time zone: UTC+1 (CET)
  - Summer (DST): UTC+2 (CEST)
- Postal code: 33050
- Dialing code: 0431
- Patron saint: St. Martin
- Saint day: 11 November
- Website: Official website

Marano Lagunare (Friulian: Maran) is a comune (municipality) in the Regional decentralization entity of Udine in the Italian region of Friuli-Venezia Giulia, located about 50 kilometres (31 mi) northwest of Trieste and about 35 kilometres (22 mi) south of Udine.

Marano Lagunare borders the following municipalities: Carlino, Grado, Latisana, Lignano Sabbiadoro, Muzzana del Turgnano, Palazzolo dello Stella, Precenicco, San Giorgio di Nogaro.

== Twin towns ==
Marano Lagunare is twinned with:

- Schweighouse-sur-Moder, France
