= Pozzuolo del Friuli =

Pozzuolo del Friuli Puçui (Friulian)
- Comune
- Comune di Pozzuolo del Friuli
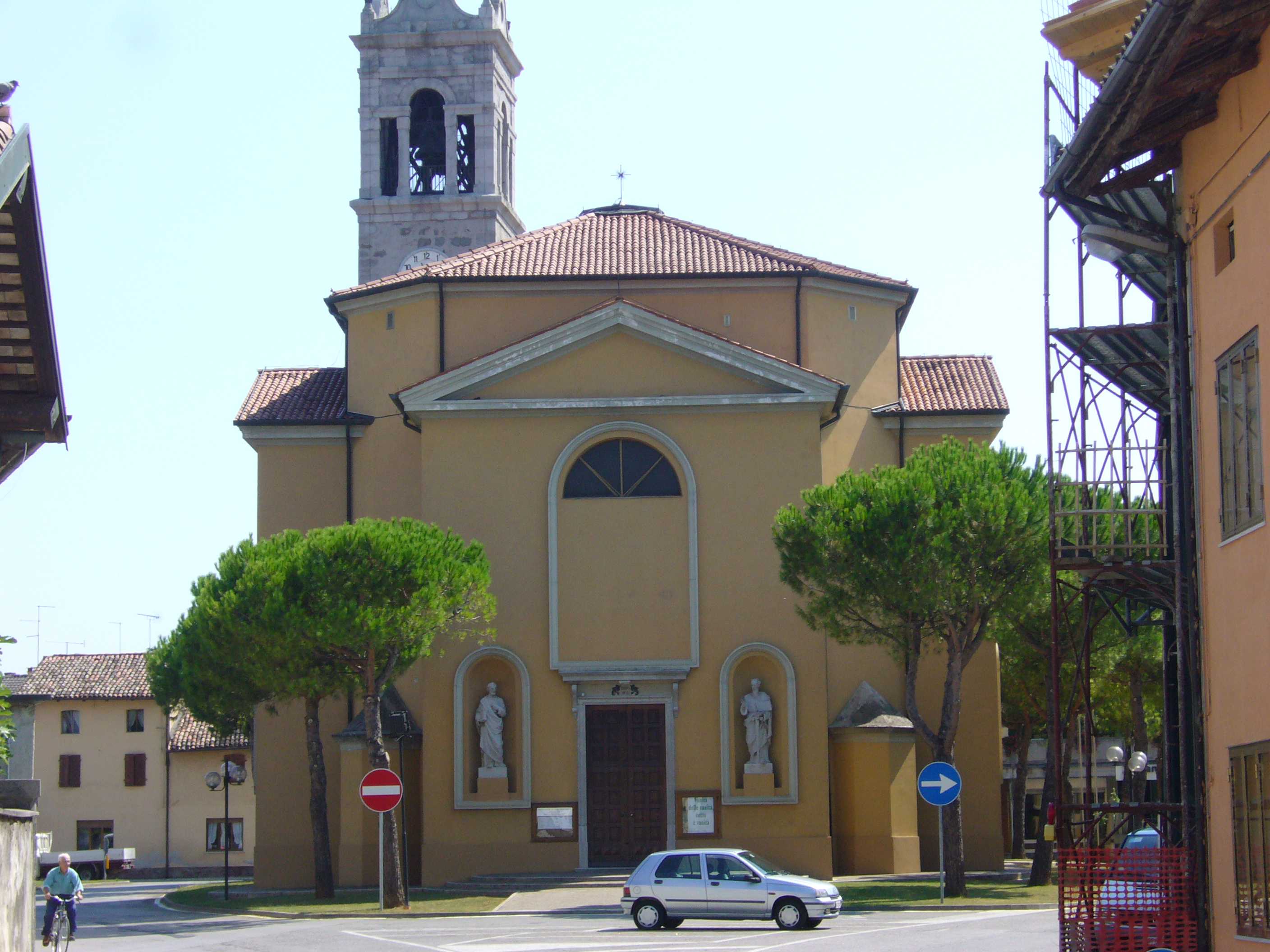

- Coat of arms

- Location within Italy Location within Friuli-Venezia Giulia
- Coordinates: 45°59′N 13°12′E
- Country: Italy
- Region: Friuli-Venezia Giulia
- Province: Udine (UD)
- Frazioni: Pozzuolo del Friuli, Zugliano, Terenzano, Cargnacco, Sammardenchia, Carpeneto

Government
  - Mayor: Denis Lodolo

Area
  - Total: 34.37 km^{2} (13.27 sq mi)
- Elevation: 67 m (220 ft)

Population (30 April 2017)
  - Total: 6,927
  - Density: 201.5/km^{2} (522.0/sq mi)
- Demonym: Pozzuolesi
- Time zone: UTC+1 (CET)
  - Summer (DST): UTC+2 (CEST)
- Postal code: 33050
- Dialing code: 0432
- ISTAT code: 030079
- Website: Official website

Pozzuolo del Friuli (Friulian: Puçui) is a comune (municipality) in the Regional decentralization entity of Udine in the Italian region of Friuli-Venezia Giulia, located about 60 kilometres (37 mi) northwest of Trieste and about 10 kilometres (6 mi) southwest of Udine.

It borders to the north-east with the Comune of Basiliano, to the north with the Comune of Udine and Campoformido, and to the east with the comune of Pavia di Udine, and to the south with the comune of Mortegliano, and to the west with the comune of Lestizza. It is crossed by the Cormor torrent, and is located in the central part of the Friulian Plain. Under its administration are also the villages of Cargnacco, Carpeneto, Sammardenchia, Terenzano and Zugliano.

== History ==
=== Medieval ===
During the Barbarian invasions of Italy, Pozzuolo, just like other Friulian villages, started concentrating around its church in order to better defend itself. It was only till 921 A.D. that the name of Pozzuolo appeared on an official document, in particular due to the donation that the Berengario Emperor made to the town. During this period the town is administered mainly by the reunion of the local family heads. In 1441 the battle between the people of Udine and Cividale took place near Pozzuolo. From 1420, Udine together with the town of Pozzuolo was assimilated under the control of the Republic of Venice. During the Turkish invasions of Europe, Pozzuolo was first destroyed by Turkish raiders during 1477, while destroyed a second time in 1499 by the last Turkish assault.

=== Battle of Pozzuolo del Friuli ===
One of the most significant historical events in Pozzuolo has been that of the Battle of Pozzuolo del Friuli which took place between 29 and 30 October 1917, following the Battle of Caporetto, where Austro-Hungarian troops reinforced by German divisions managed to break through the Italian front line, and rout the Italian Second Army. In the two days during which the battle took palace, a cavalry brigate composed by the Quarto Genova and Quinto Novara, and the infantry brigate of Bergamo, faced the Austro-Hungarian army, allowing for the Italian Third Army to cross the river Tagliamento and save itself. The battle left hundreds of dead, and took place between the alleys of the town, afflicting also the civil population. To commemorate this battle, starting from 1959 the only cavalry division of the Italian army is named "Pozzuolo del Friuli" brigate, and commemorates the event every 30 October. The town of Pozzuolo has two monuments dedicated to the cavalry and infantry respectively.

== Twin towns ==
- Santa Fiora, Italy
