= Santa Maria la Longa =

Santa Maria la Longa Sante Marie la Lungje (Friulian)
- Comune
- Comune di Santa Maria la Longa
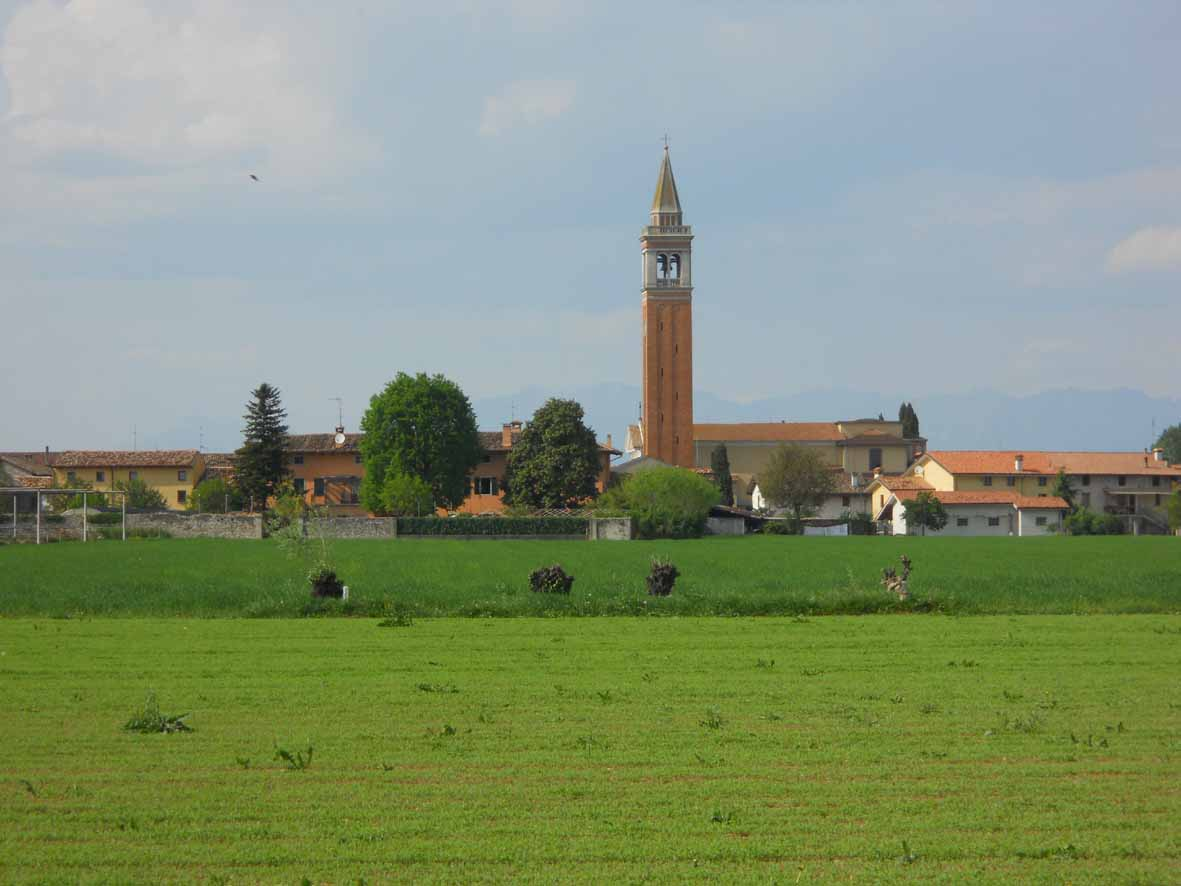

- Coat of arms

- Location within Italy Location within Friuli-Venezia Giulia
- Coordinates: 45°56′N 13°18′E
- Country: Italy
- Region: Friuli-Venezia Giulia
- Province: Udine (UD)
- Frazioni: Mereto di Capitolo, Ronchiettis, Santo Stefano Udinese, Tissano

Government
  - Mayor: Fabio Pettenà (lista Cambiamo Insieme.)

Area
  - Total: 19.6 km^{2} (7.6 sq mi)
- Elevation: 38 m (125 ft)

Population (31 May 2025)
  - Total: 2,300
  - Density: 120/km^{2} (300/sq mi)
- Demonym: Santamarialonghesi
- Time zone: UTC+1 (CET)
  - Summer (DST): UTC+2 (CEST)
- Postal code: 33050
- Dialing code: 0432
- Patron saint: St. Mary
- Saint day: 15 August
- Website: Official website

Santa Maria la Longa (Friulian: Sante Marie la Lungje) is a comune (municipality) in the Regional decentralization entity of Udine in the Italian region of Friuli-Venezia Giulia, located about 50 kilometres (31 mi) northwest of Trieste and about 15 kilometres (9 mi) southeast of Udine. The Municipality is situated in a central position in the plain of Friuli with the chief town Santa Maria la Longa and the hamlets of Tissano, Mereto di Capitolo, Santo Stefano Udinese and Ronchiettis.

Santa Maria la Longa borders the following municipalities: Bicinicco, Gonars, Palmanova, Pavia di Udine, Trivignano Udinese.

== History ==
The settlements in the territory of Santa Maria la Longa are documented only starting from the Roman period; in fact, many archaeological finds scattered in a uniform way over the whole area date back to that age.

It is worth mentioning the hamlet of Tissano, which was destroyed by the Turks in 1477; its antiquity is proven by the finding - in the 1950s - of a Lombard cemetery.

== Monuments and places of interest ==
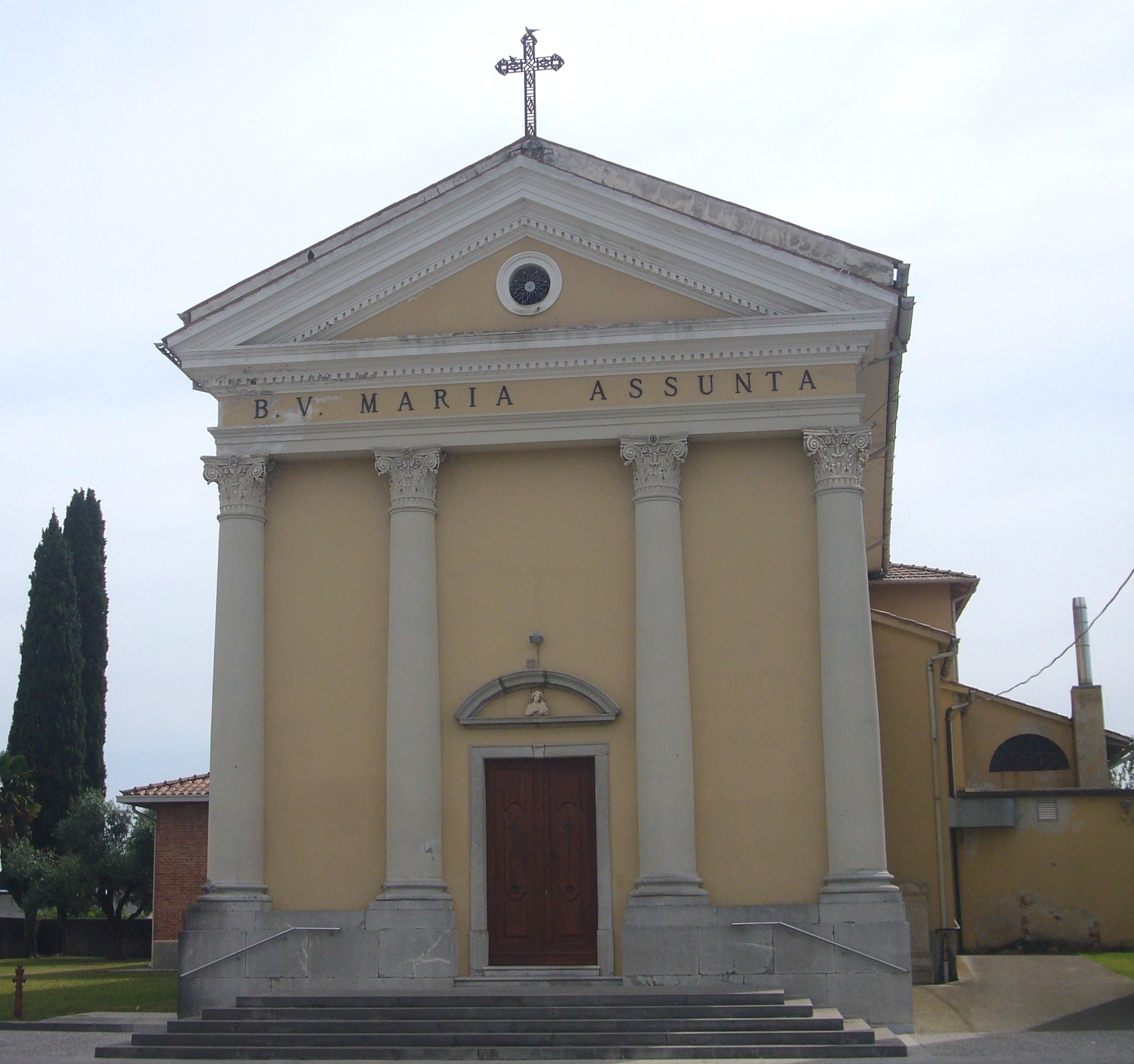
Parish church

- Church of Santa Maria Assunta is the parish church
- Church of San Giovanni Bosco
- Church of St. Joseph
- Church of San Giorgio (via Roma)
- Parish Church of St. Michael the Archangel (Tissano)
- Villa Caimo Mauroner
- Villa Strassoldo Agricola Del Torso
- Villa di Colloredo Mels
- Villa Turchetti-Vintani
- Villa Bearzi
- Villa Vintani, ora Zamaro
- Palazzo rosso
- Statue in homage to "Mattina" by Giuseppe Ungaretti
- Stele Celiberti e Brigata Catanzaro
- Colonna della Berlina

== Gallery ==
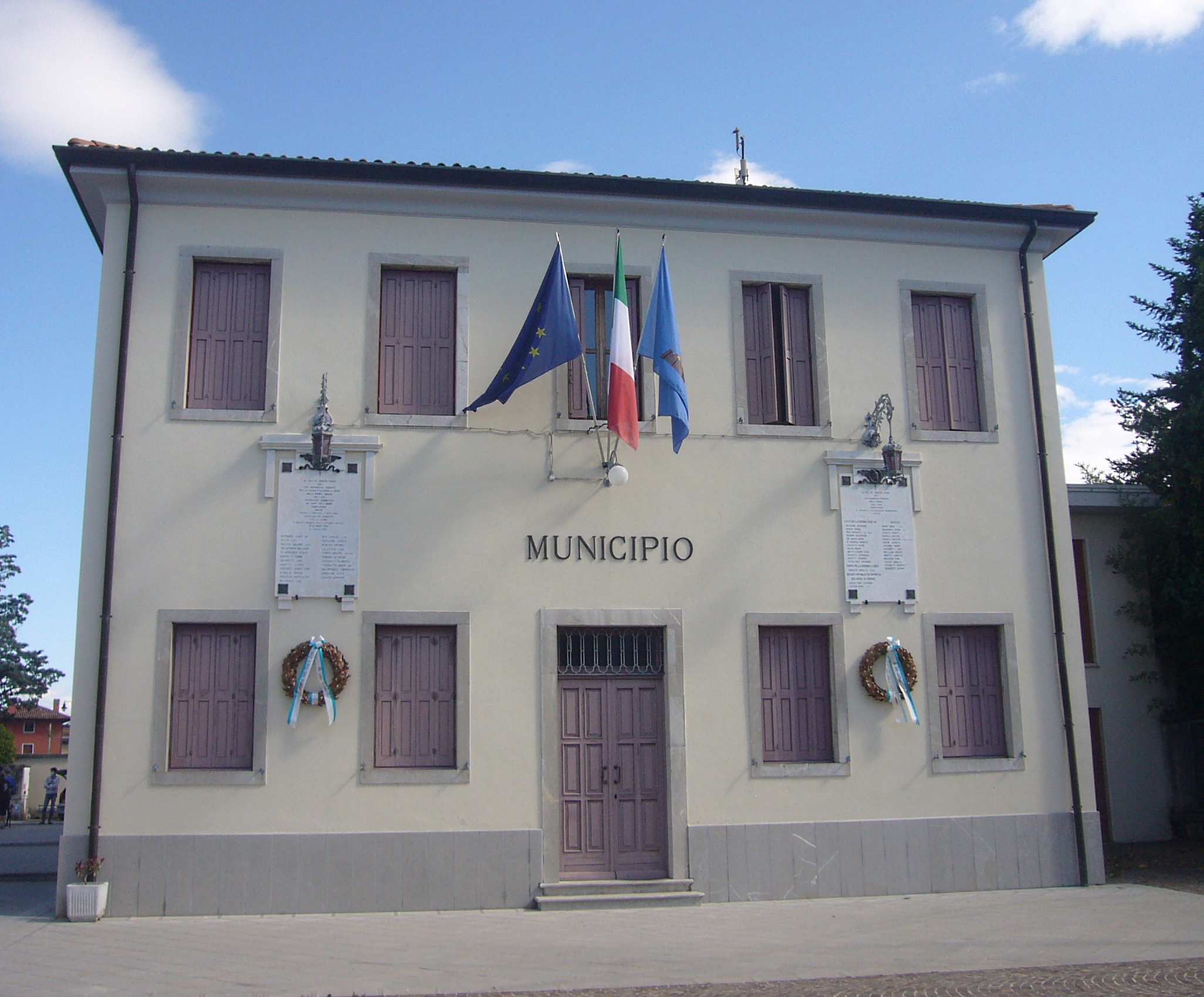
town hall

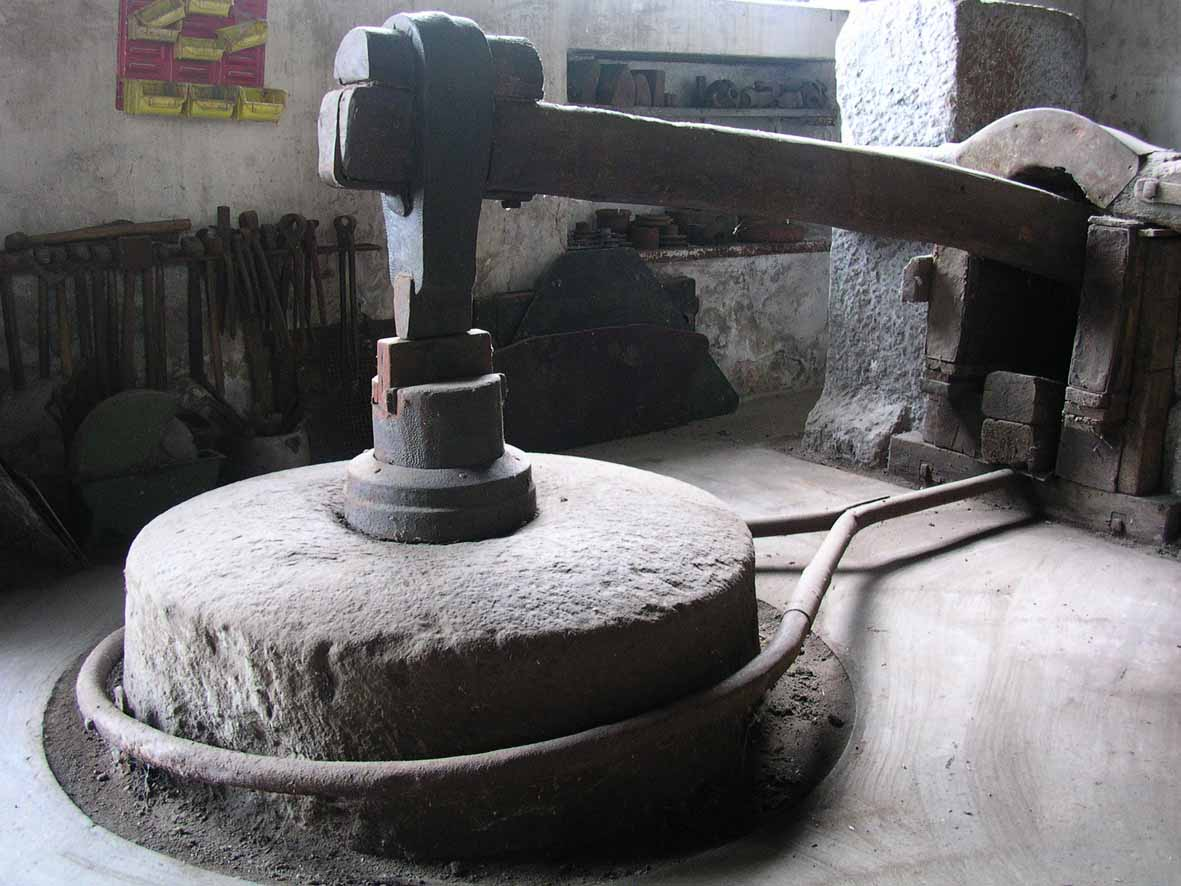
maglio fucina Mariano Fabris

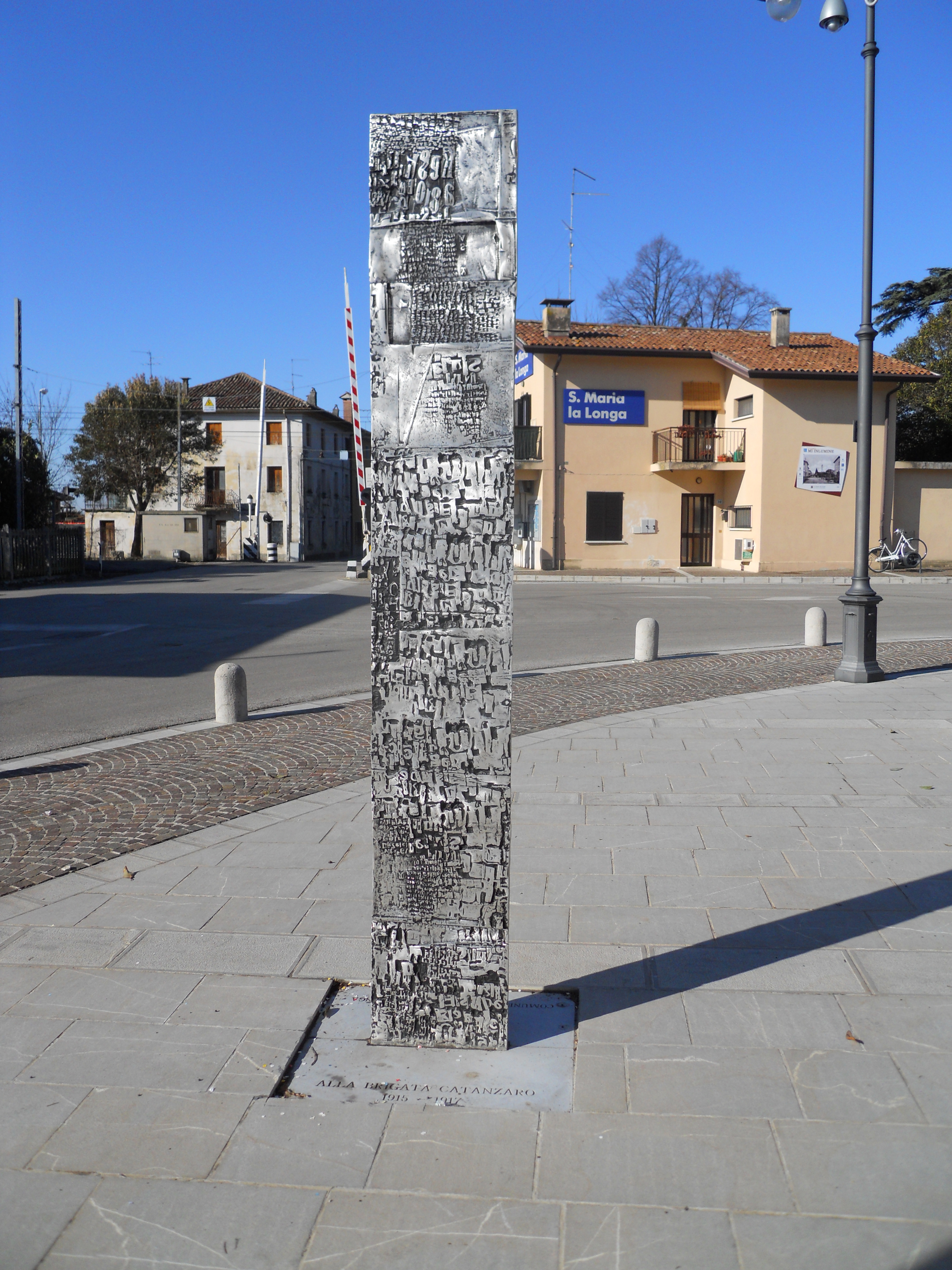
work by Giorgio Celiberti dedicated to the Catanzaro Brigade

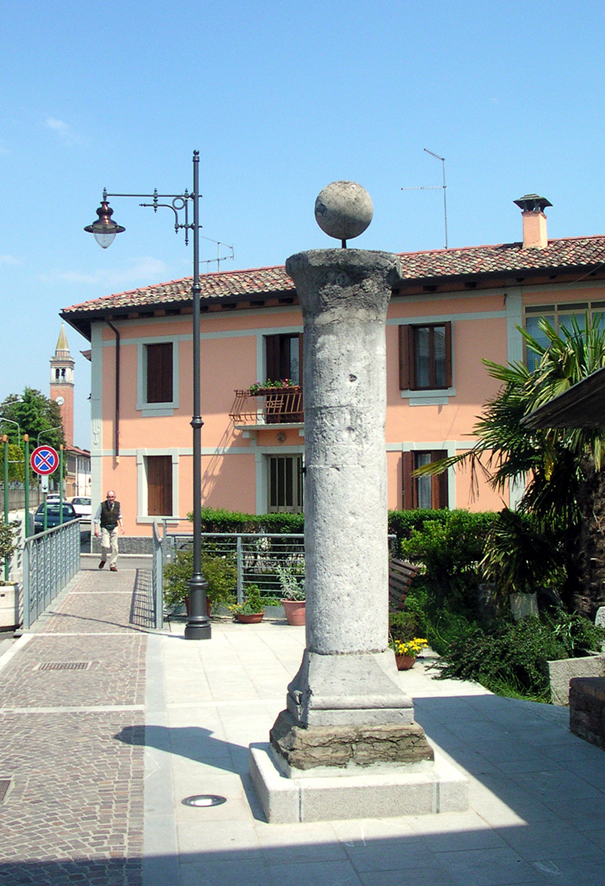
la Berlina

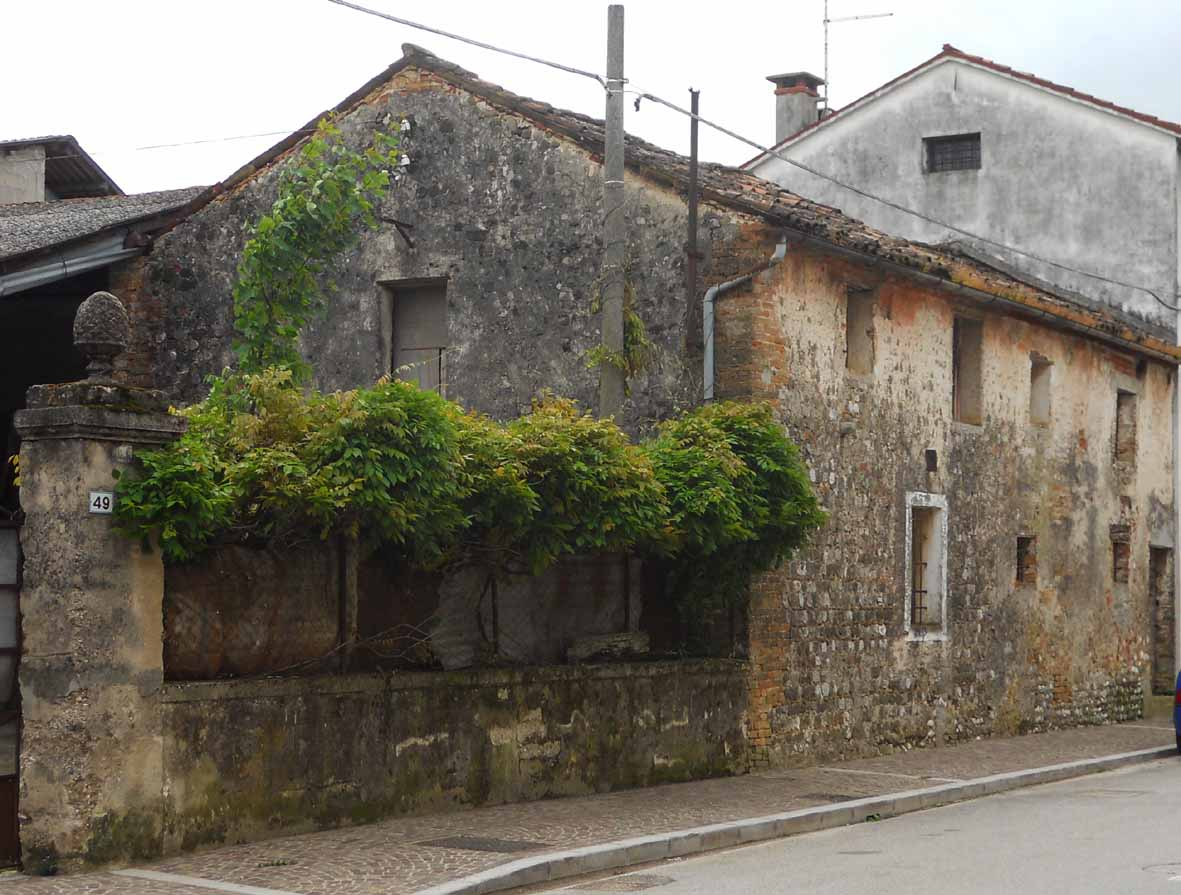
casa Pontoni

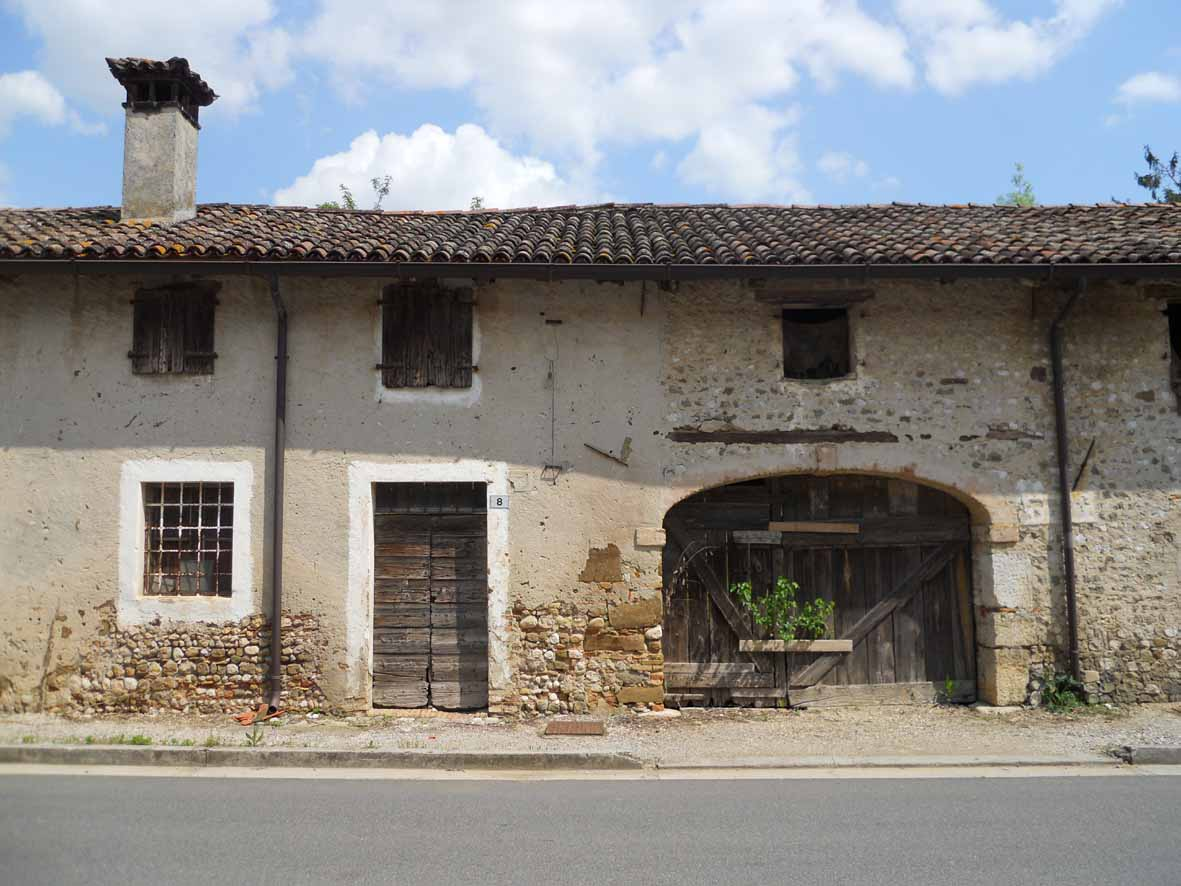
casa Volpetti
