= Bicinicco =

Bicinicco Bicinins (Friulian)
- Comune
- Comune di Bicinicco
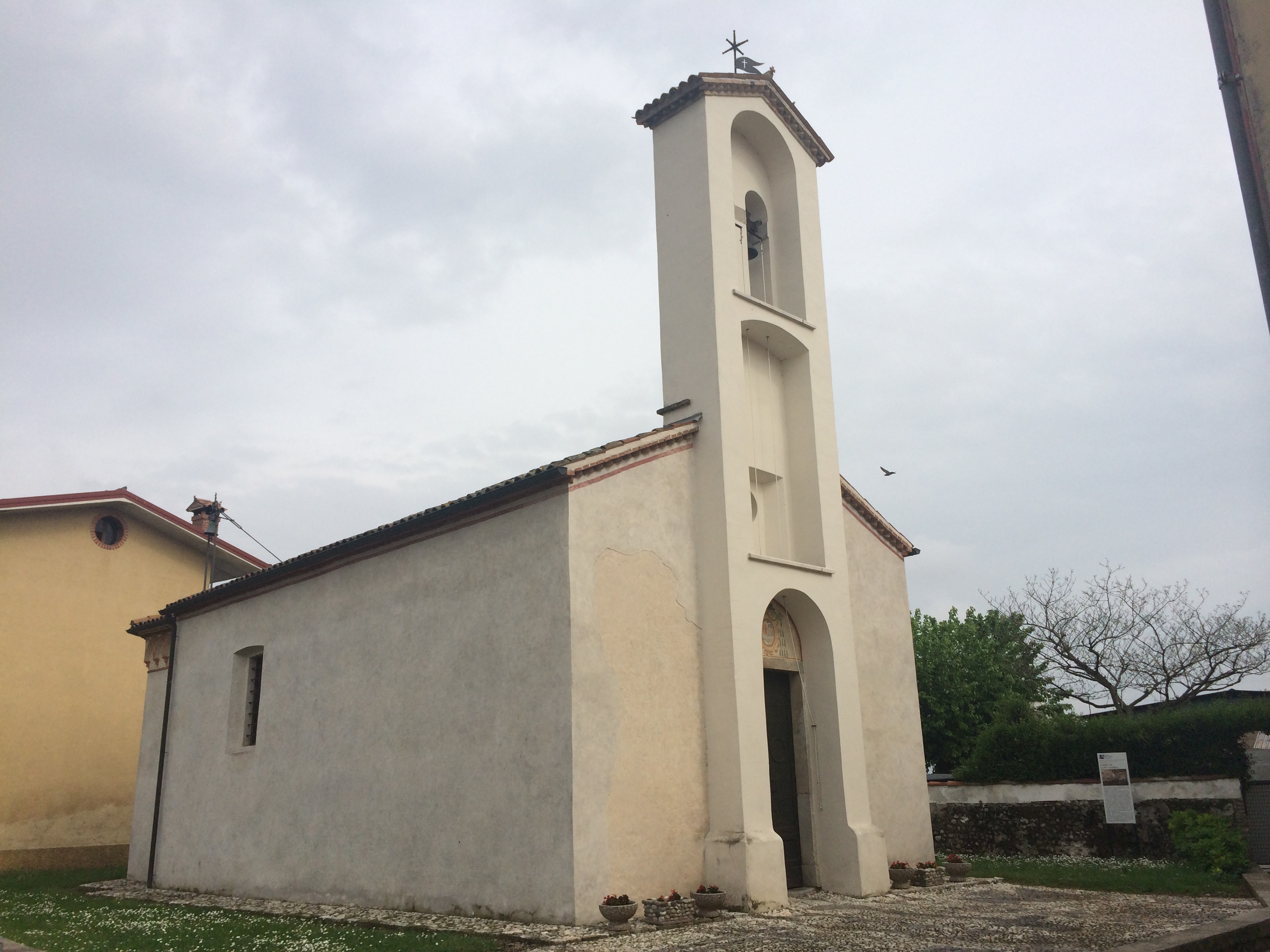
- Church of Sant'Andrea, in the frazione of Gris.

- Coat of arms

- Location within Italy Location within Friuli-Venezia Giulia
- Coordinates: 45°56′N 13°15′E
- Country: Italy
- Region: Friuli-Venezia Giulia
- Province: Udine (UD)
- Frazioni: Cuccana, Felettis, Griis

Government
  - Mayor: Giovanni Battista Bossi

Area
  - Total: 15.9 km^{2} (6.1 sq mi)
- Elevation: 37 m (121 ft)

Population (30 April 2017)
  - Total: 1,885
  - Density: 119/km^{2} (307/sq mi)
- Demonym: Bicinicchesi
- Time zone: UTC+1 (CET)
  - Summer (DST): UTC+2 (CEST)
- Postal code: 33050
- Dialing code: 0432
- Website: www.comune.bicinicco.ud.it

Bicinicco (Friulian: Bicinins) is a comune (municipality) in the Regional decentralization entity of Udine in the Italian region of Friuli-Venezia Giulia, located about 50 kilometres (31 mi) northwest of Trieste and about 15 kilometres (9 mi) south of Udine.

Bicinicco borders the following municipalities: Castions di Strada, Gonars, Mortegliano, Pavia di Udine, Santa Maria la Longa.

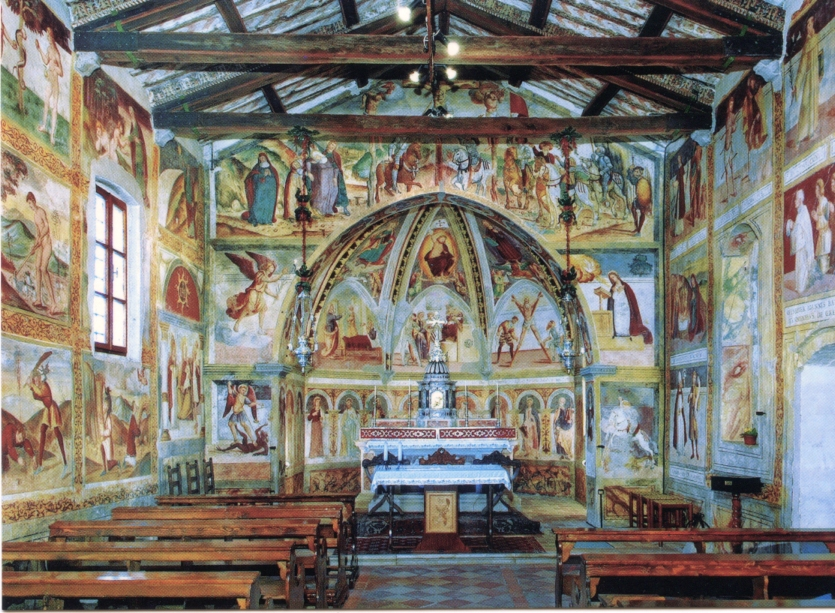
Interior of the church of Sant'Andrea in Griis
