= Rivignano =

Rivignano Rivignan (Friulian)
- Frazione
- Location of Rivignano in Italy
- Coordinates: 45°53′N 13°2′E
- Country: Italy
- Region: Friuli-Venezia Giulia
- Province: Udine (UD)
- Comune: Rivignano Teor

Area
  - Total: 30.5 km^{2} (11.8 sq mi)
- Elevation: 16 m (52 ft)

Population (Dec. 2004)
  - Total: 4,269
  - Density: 140/km^{2} (363/sq mi)
- Demonym: Rivignanesi
- Time zone: UTC+1 (CET)
  - Summer (DST): UTC+2 (CEST)
- Postal code: 33050
- Dialing code: 0432
- Patron saint: Saint John Paul II
- Saint day: 22 October

Rivignano (Friulian: Rivignan) was a comune (municipality) in the Province of Udine in the Italian region Friuli-Venezia Giulia, located about 70 kilometres (43 mi) northwest of Trieste and about 25 kilometres (16 mi) southwest of Udine.

Since January 1, 2014 Rivignano has been merged with Teor, forming a new municipality called Rivignano Teor.
