= Castions di Strada =

Castions di Strada Cjasteons di Strade (Friulian)
- Comune
- Comune di Castions di Strada
- Coat of arms

- Location within Italy Location within Friuli-Venezia Giulia
- Coordinates: 45°54′N 13°11′E
- Country: Italy
- Region: Friuli-Venezia Giulia
- Province: Udine (UD)
- Frazioni: Morsano di Strada

Government
  - Mayor: Ivan Petrucco

Area
  - Total: 32.83 km^{2} (12.68 sq mi)
- Elevation: 23 m (75 ft)

Population (28 February 2017)
  - Total: 3,814
  - Density: 116.2/km^{2} (300.9/sq mi)
- Demonym: Castionesi
- Time zone: UTC+1 (CET)
  - Summer (DST): UTC+2 (CEST)
- Postal code: 33050
- Dialing code: 0432
- Website: Official website

Castions di Strada (Friulian: Cjasteons di Strade) is a comune (municipality) in the Regional decentralization entity of Udine in the Italian region of Friuli-Venezia Giulia, located about 60 kilometres (37 mi) northwest of Trieste and about 20 kilometres (12 mi) south of Udine.

== Geography ==
Castions borders the following municipalities: Bicinicco, Carlino, Gonars, Mortegliano, Muzzana del Turgnano, Pocenia, Porpetto, San Giorgio di Nogaro, Talmassons.

== Twin towns ==
Castions di Strada is twinned with:

- San Filippo del Mela, Italy
