= Massimiliano Panizzut =

Italian politician (born 1968)

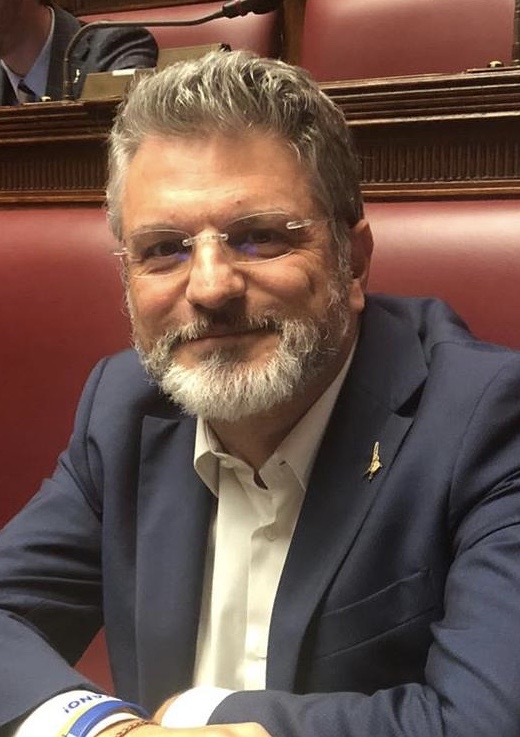
- Panizzut in 2019

Member of the Chamber of Deputies
- Incumbent
- Assumed office 23 March 2018
- Constituency: Friuli-Venezia Giulia – P01 (2018–2022); Friuli-Venezia Giulia – U03 (2022–present)

Personal details
- Born: 10 December 1968 (age 57)
- Party: Lega

Massimiliano Panizzut (born 10 December 1968) is an Italian politician serving as a member of the Chamber of Deputies since 2018. From 2014 to 2019, he was a municipal councillor of Budoia. From 2006 to 2011, he was a municipal councillor of Biassono.
