= Muzzana del Turgnano =

Muzzana del Turgnano Muçane (Friulian)
- Comune
- Comune di Muzzana del Turgnano
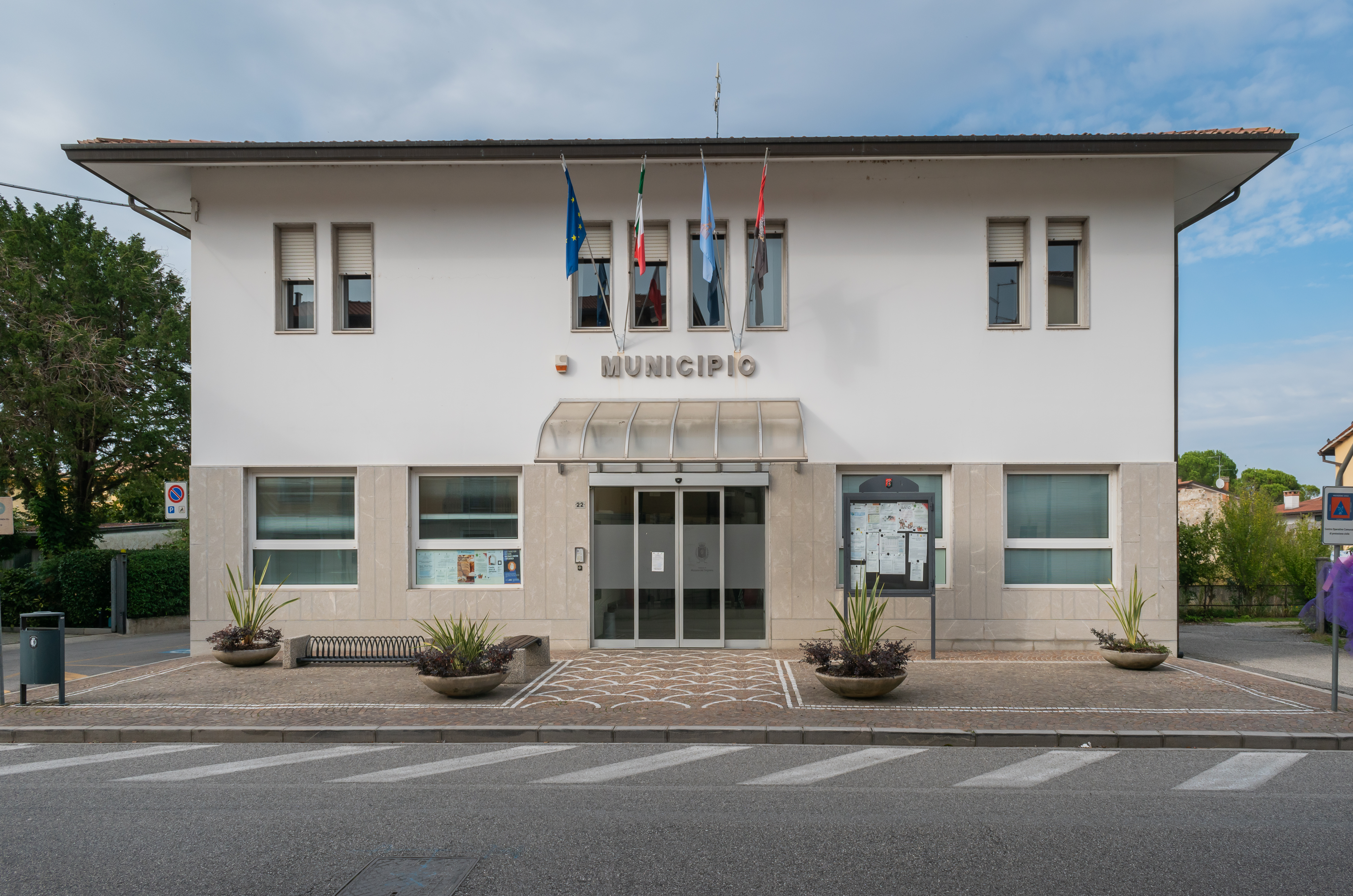

- Location within Italy Location within Friuli-Venezia Giulia
- Coordinates: 45°49′N 13°8′E
- Country: Italy
- Region: Friuli-Venezia Giulia
- Province: Udine (UD)
- Frazioni: Casali Franceschinis

Government
  - Mayor: Cristian Sedran

Area
  - Total: 24.4 km^{2} (9.4 sq mi)
- Elevation: 7 m (23 ft)

Population (30 November 2017)
  - Total: 2,502
  - Density: 103/km^{2} (266/sq mi)
- Demonym: Muzzanesi
- Time zone: UTC+1 (CET)
  - Summer (DST): UTC+2 (CEST)
- Postal code: 33055
- Dialing code: 0431
- Patron saint: St. Vitalis
- Saint day: 30 April
- Website: Official website

Muzzana del Turgnano (Friulian: Muçane) is a comune (municipality) in the Regional decentralization entity of Udine in the Italian region of Friuli-Venezia Giulia, located about 60 kilometres (37 mi) northwest of Trieste and about 30 kilometres (19 mi) southwest of Udine.

Muzzana del Turgnano borders the following municipalities: Carlino, Castions di Strada, Marano Lagunare, Palazzolo dello Stella, Pocenia.
