= Mortegliano =

Mortegliano Mortean (Friulian)
- Comune
- Comune di Mortegliano
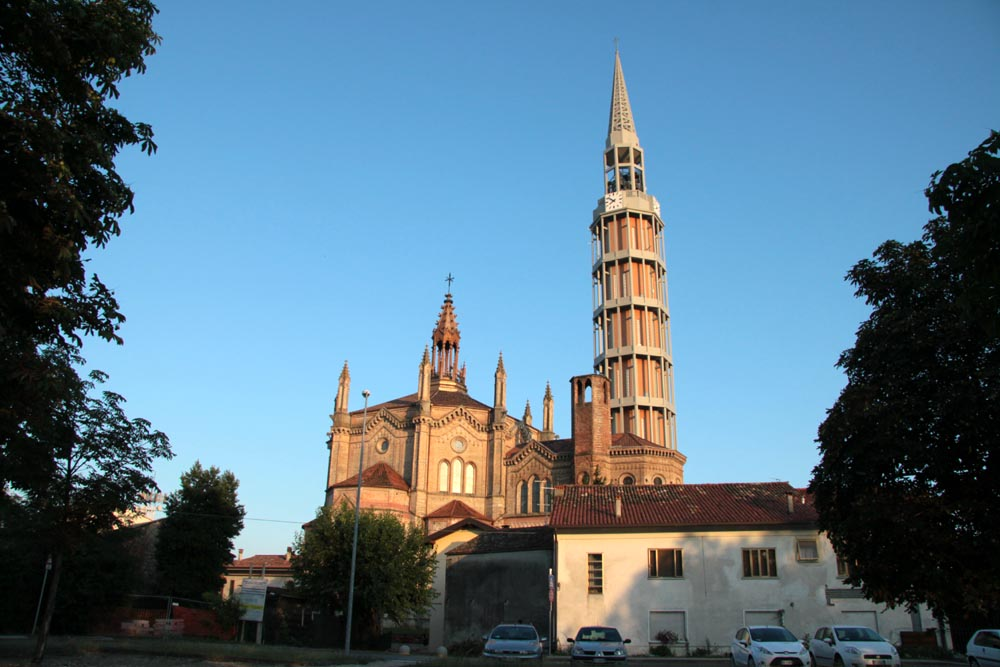
- Mortegliano Cathedral

- Location within Italy Location within Friuli-Venezia Giulia
- Coordinates: 45°57′N 13°10′E
- Country: Italy
- Region: Friuli-Venezia Giulia
- Province: Udine (UD)
- Frazioni: Chiasiellis, Lavariano

Government
  - Mayor: Roberto Zuliani

Area
  - Total: 30.05 km^{2} (11.60 sq mi)
- Elevation: 41 m (135 ft)

Population (31 December 2022)
  - Total: 4,814
  - Density: 160.2/km^{2} (414.9/sq mi)
- Demonym: Morteglianesi
- Time zone: UTC+1 (CET)
  - Summer (DST): UTC+2 (CEST)
- Postal code: 33050
- Dialing code: 0432
- Website: Official website

Mortegliano (Italian pronunciation: [morteʎˈʎaːno]; Friulian: Mortean) is a comune (municipality) in the Regional decentralization entity of Udine in the Italian region of Friuli-Venezia Giulia, located about 60 km (37 miles) northwest of Trieste and about 14 km (8 3/4 miles) southwest of Udine.

Mortegliano borders the following municipalities: Bicinicco, Castions di Strada, Lestizza, Pavia di Udine, Pozzuolo del Friuli, Talmassons.

The Mortegliano Bell Tower is the tallest campanile, a free-standing bell tower, in the world at 113.2 m (371 ft) high.

== Sport ==
Chiasiellis, a women's football club that has played in the top flight several times, is based in the hamlet of the same name. There is also a men's football club, the A.S.D. Lavarian Mortean, currently playing in Promozione.

It was the starting point of the 19th stage (Mortegliano–Sappada) of the 2024 Giro d'Italia.

== Twin towns ==
Mortegliano is twinned with:

- Arborea, Italy
