= Carlino =

Carlino Cjarlins (Friulian)
- Comune
- Comune di Carlino / Comun di Cjarlins
- Location within Italy Location within Friuli-Venezia Giulia
- Coordinates: 45°48′N 13°11′E
- Country: Italy
- Region: Friuli-Venezia Giulia
- Province: Udine (UD)

Area
  - Total: 30.3 km^{2} (11.7 sq mi)

Population (Dec. 2004)
  - Total: 2,816
  - Density: 92.9/km^{2} (241/sq mi)
- Time zone: UTC+1 (CET)
  - Summer (DST): UTC+2 (CEST)
- Postal code: 33050
- Dialing code: 0431

Carlino (Friulian: Cjarlins) is a comune (municipality) in the Regional decentralization entity of Udine in the Italian region of Friuli-Venezia Giulia, located about 50 kilometres (31 mi) northwest of Trieste and about 30 kilometres (19 mi) south of Udine. As of 31 December 2004, it had a population of 2,816 and an area of 30.3 square kilometres (11.7 mi^{2}).

Carlino borders the following municipalities: Castions di Strada, Marano Lagunare, Muzzana del Turgnano, San Giorgio di Nogaro.

Carlino is the name of the premier family from the Casino area for which the town of Carlino was named.

== Demographic evolution ==
Historical population

Year	Pop.	±%
1861	?	—
1871	841	—
1881	743	−11.7%
1901	957	+28.8%
1911	1,164	+21.6%

Year	Pop.	±%
1921	1,282	+10.1%
1931	1,649	+28.6%
1936	1,986	+20.4%
1951	2,387	+20.2%
1961	2,285	−4.3%

Year	Pop.	±%
1971	2,317	+1.4%
1981	2,571	+11.0%
1991	2,688	+4.6%
2001	2,822	+5.0%

Source: Data from ISTAT

== Notable people ==
- Mara Navarria
