= Pavia di Udine =

Pavia di Udine Pavie (Friulian)
- Comune
- Comune di Pavia di Udine
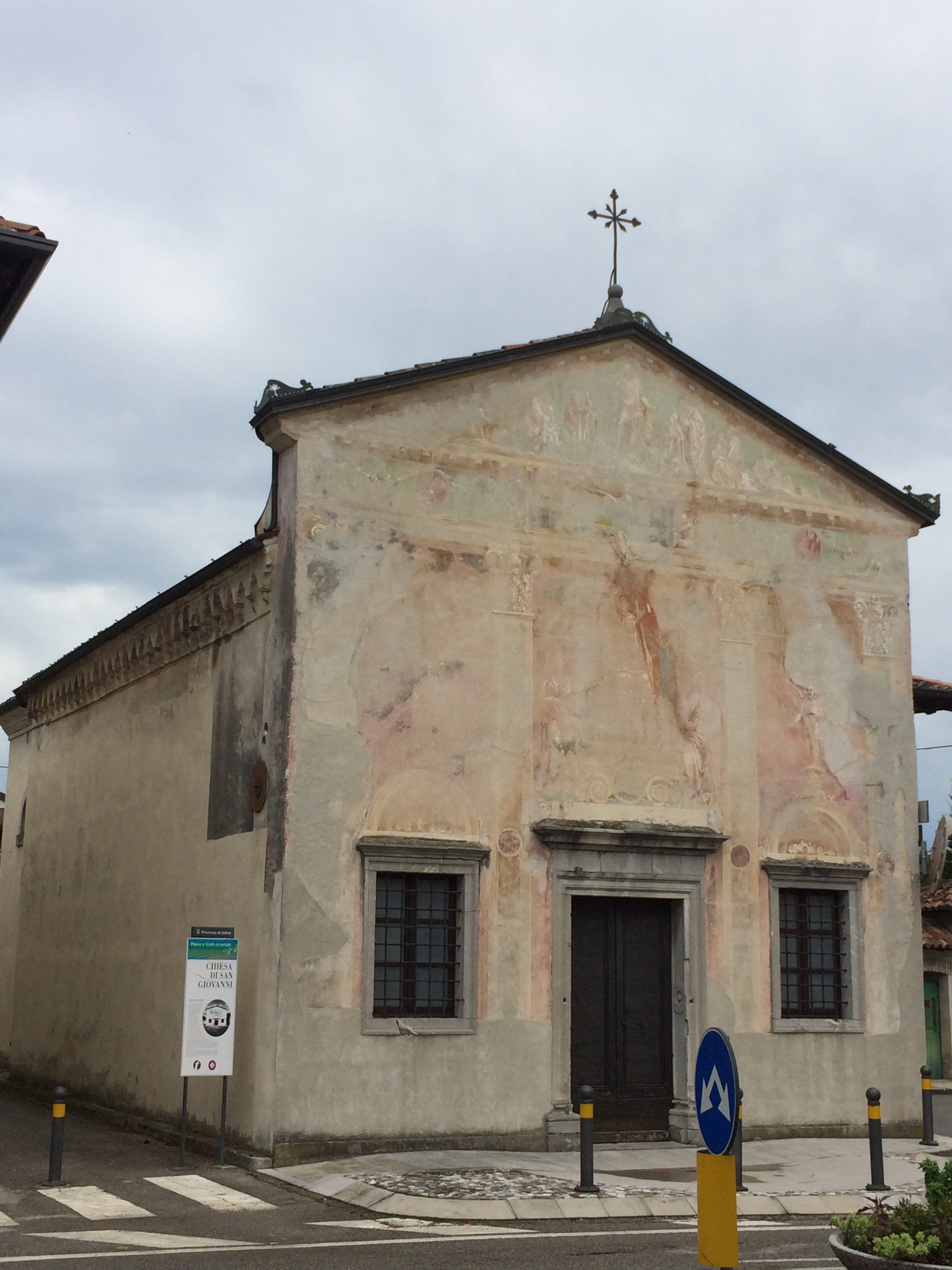
- The Chiesa di San Giovanni dei Battuti (Pavia di Udine)

- Location within Italy Location within Friuli-Venezia Giulia
- Coordinates: 46°0′N 13°18′E
- Country: Italy
- Region: Friuli-Venezia Giulia
- Province: Udine (UD)
- Frazioni: Chiasottis, Cortello, Lauzacco, Lumignacco, Moretto, Pavia di Udine, Selvuzzis, Percoto, Persereano, Popereacco, Risano, Ronchi

Government
  - Mayor: Beppino Govetto

Area
  - Total: 33.34 km^{2} (12.87 sq mi)
- Elevation: 60 m (200 ft)

Population (30 April 2017)
  - Total: 5,571
  - Density: 167.1/km^{2} (432.8/sq mi)
- Demonym: Paviesi
- Time zone: UTC+1 (CET)
  - Summer (DST): UTC+2 (CEST)
- Postal code: 33050
- Dialing code: 0432
- Website: Official website

Pavia di Udine (Friulian: Pavie) is a comune (municipality) in the Regional decentralization entity of Udine in the Italian region of Friuli-Venezia Giulia, located about 60 kilometres (37 mi) northwest of Trieste and about 9 kilometres (6 mi) southeast of Udine.

Pavia di Udine borders the following municipalities: Bicinicco, Buttrio, Manzano, Mortegliano, Pozzuolo del Friuli, Pradamano, Santa Maria la Longa, Trivignano Udinese, Udine.

== See also ==
- Nonino
