= Pocenia =

Pocenia Pucinie (Friulian)
- Comune
- Comune di Pocenia
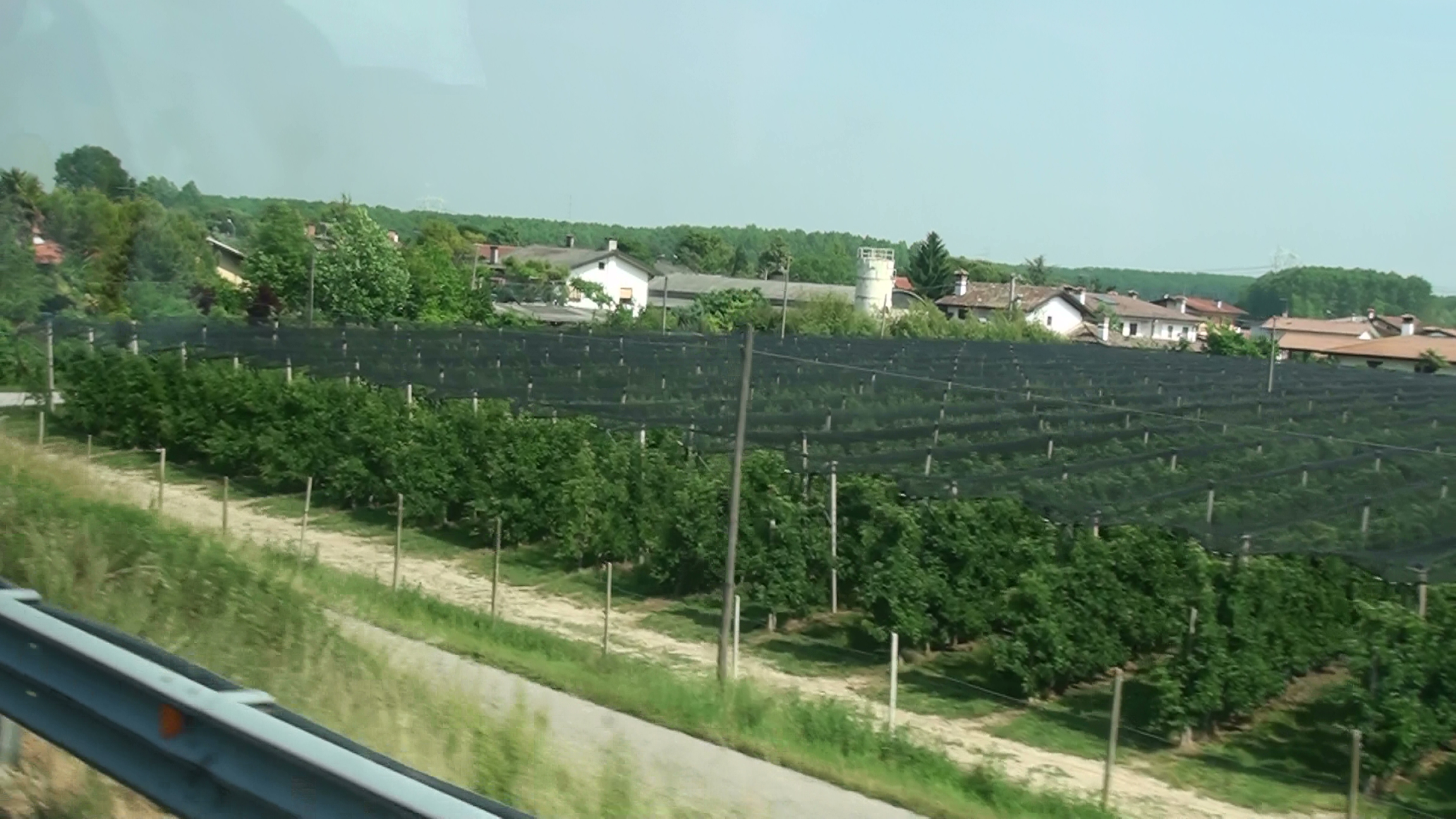

- Location within Italy Location within Friuli-Venezia Giulia
- Coordinates: 45°50′N 13°6′E
- Country: Italy
- Region: Friuli-Venezia Giulia
- Province: Udine (UD)
- Frazioni: Torsa, Roveredo, Paradiso

Government
  - Mayor: Sirio Gigante

Area
  - Total: 23.98 km^{2} (9.26 sq mi)
- Elevation: 9 m (30 ft)

Population (28 February 2017)
  - Total: 2,498
  - Density: 104.2/km^{2} (269.8/sq mi)
- Demonym: Poceniesi
- Time zone: UTC+1 (CET)
  - Summer (DST): UTC+2 (CEST)
- Postal code: 33050
- Dialing code: 0432
- Website: Official website

Pocenia (Friulian: Pucinie) is a comune (municipality) in the Regional decentralization entity of Udine in the Italian region of Friuli-Venezia Giulia, located about 60 kilometres (37 mi) northwest of Trieste and about 30 kilometres (19 mi) southwest of Udine.

Pocenia borders the following municipalities: Castions di Strada, Muzzana del Turgnano, Palazzolo dello Stella, Rivignano Teor, Talmassons.
