= Rivignano Teor =

Rivignano Teor Rivignan Teôr (Friulian)
- Comune
- Comune di Rivignano Teor
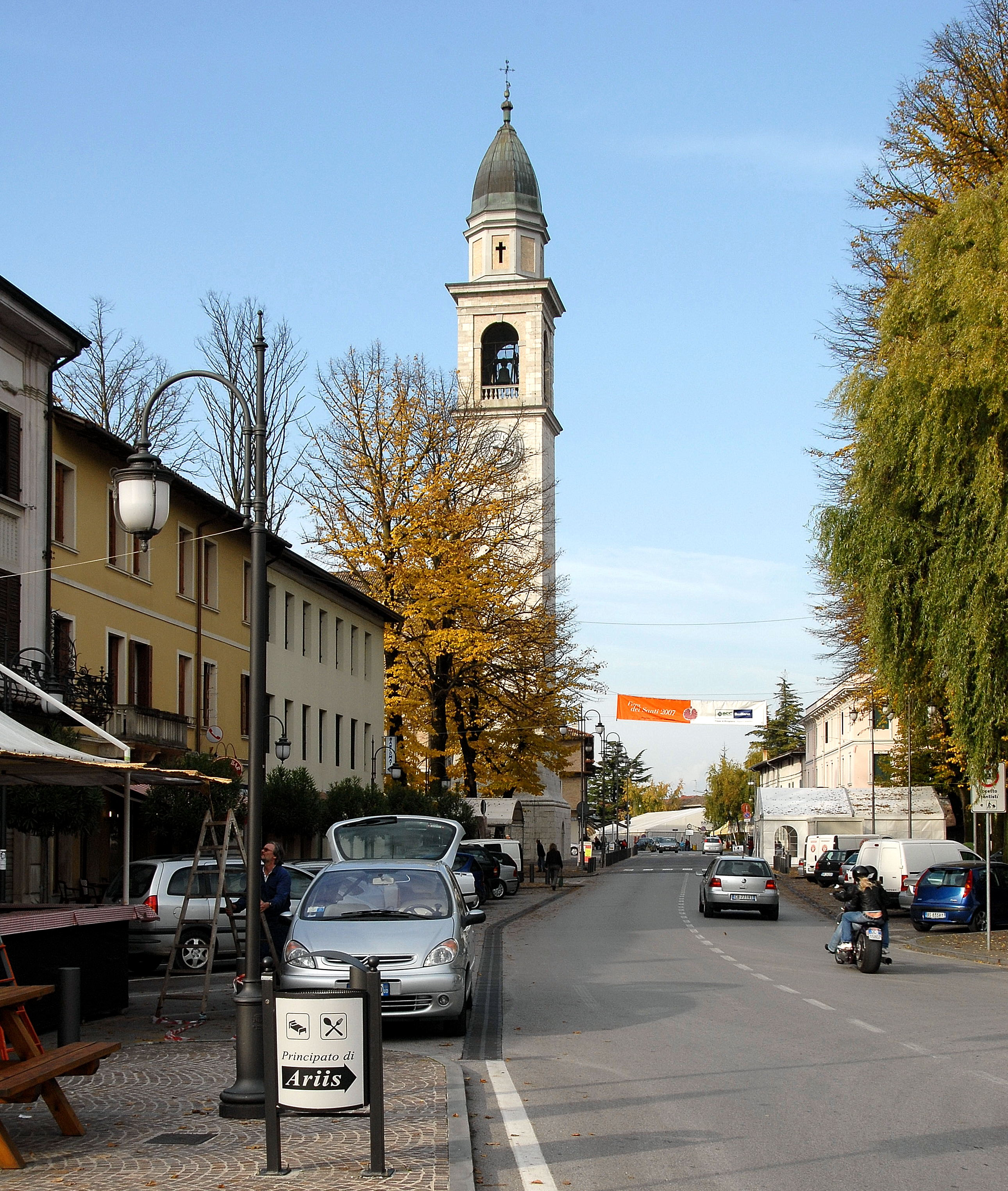

- Location within Italy Location within Friuli-Venezia Giulia
- Coordinates: 45°52′47″N 13°2′33″E
- Country: Italy
- Region: Friuli-Venezia Giulia
- Province: Udine (UD)
- Frazioni: Ariis, Campomolle, Chiarmacis, Driolassa, Flambruzzo, Rivignano, Rivarotta, Sella, Sivigliano, Teor

Government
  - Mayor: Mario Anzil

Area
  - Total: 47.43 km^{2} (18.31 sq mi)
- Elevation: 16 m (52 ft)

Population (28 February 2017)
  - Total: 6,305
  - Density: 132.9/km^{2} (344.3/sq mi)
- Demonym: Rivignanesi
- Time zone: UTC+1 (CET)
  - Summer (DST): UTC+2 (CEST)
- Postal code: 33061
- Dialing code: 0432
- Patron saint: Saint John Paul II
- Saint day: 22 October
- Website: Official website

Rivignano Teor (Friulian: Rivignan Teôr) is a comune (municipality) in the Regional decentralization entity of Udine in the Italian region of Friuli-Venezia Giulia. It was established on 1 January 2014 by the merger of the municipalities of Rivignano and Teor.
