= Palazzolo dello Stella =

Palazzolo dello Stella Palassôl (Friulian)
- Comune
- Comune di Palazzolo dello Stella
- Coat of arms

- Location within Italy Location within Friuli-Venezia Giulia
- Coordinates: 45°48′N 13°5′E
- Country: Italy
- Region: Friuli-Venezia Giulia
- Province: Udine (UD)
- Frazioni: Modeano, Piancada, Polesan

Government
  - Mayor: FRANCO D'ALTILIA

Area
  - Total: 34.4 km^{2} (13.3 sq mi)
- Elevation: 5 m (16 ft)

Population (31 December 2017)
  - Total: 2,893
  - Density: 84.1/km^{2} (218/sq mi)
- Demonym: Palazzolesi
- Time zone: UTC+1 (CET)
  - Summer (DST): UTC+2 (CEST)
- Postal code: 33056
- Dialing code: 0431
- Patron saint: St. Stephen, St. Anthony of Padua
- Saint day: 26 December / 13 June
- Website: Official website

Palazzolo dello Stella (Friulian: Palassôl) is a comune (municipality) in the Regional decentralization entity of Udine in the Italian region of Friuli-Venezia Giulia, located about 60 kilometres (37 mi) northwest of Trieste and about 30 kilometres (19 mi) southwest of Udine.

== Twin towns ==
Palazzolo dello Stella is town twinned with:

- Gratkorn, Austria
