= Monfalcone railway station =

Railway station in Molfalcone, Italy

Monfalcone
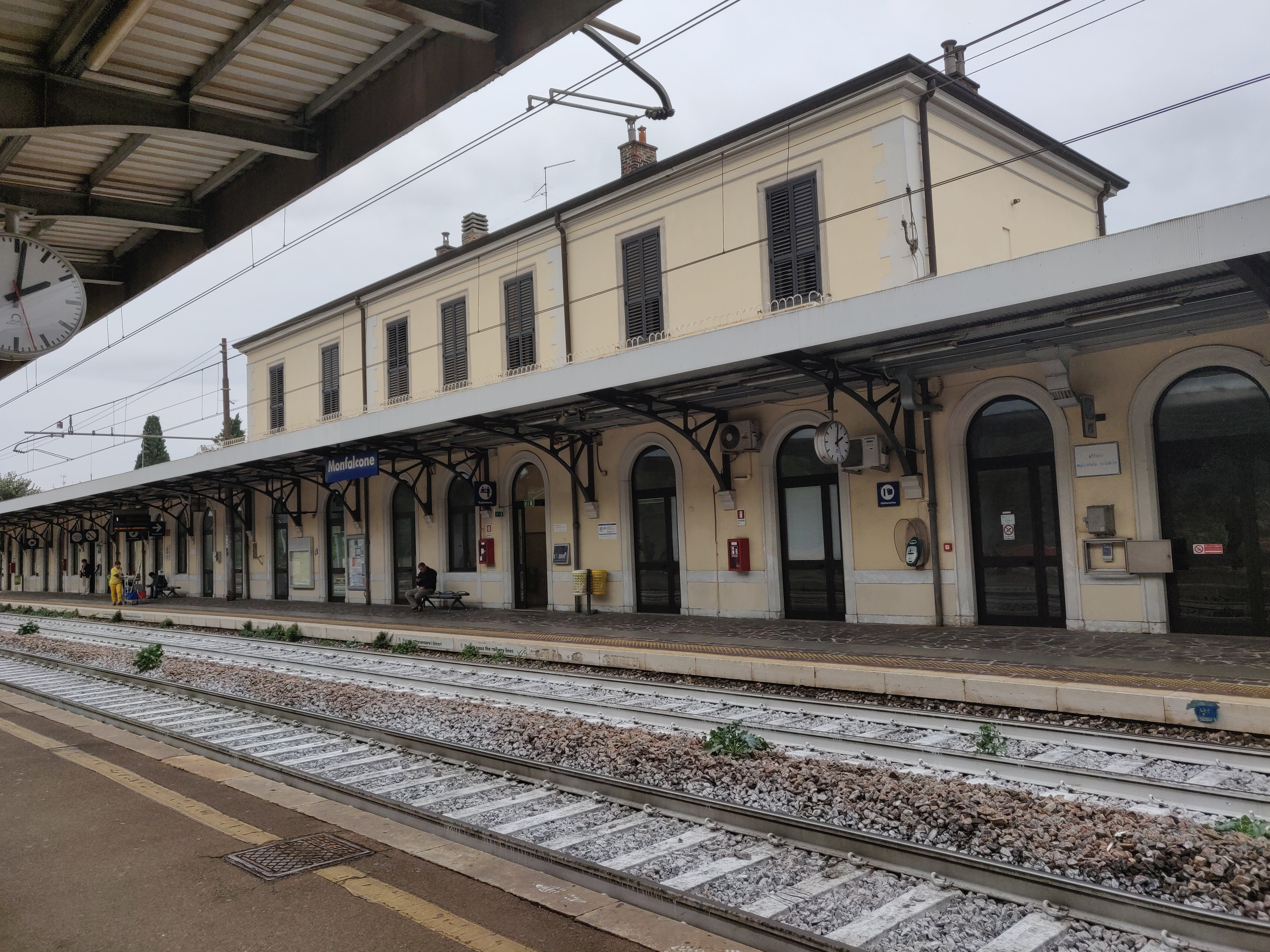
- Monfalcone train station

General information
- Location: Piazza della Stazione 1; 34074 Monfalcone GO; Monfalcone, Gorizia, Friuli-Venezia Giulia; Italy
- Coordinates: 45°48′27″N 13°32′37″E
- Operator: Rete Ferroviaria Italiana; Centostazioni
- Lines: Venice–Trieste; Udine–Trieste
- Distance: 117.746 km (73.164 mi) from Venezia Mestre
- Train operators: Trenitalia
- Connections: Suburban buses

Other information
- Classification: Silver

History
- Opened: 1 October 1860; 165 years ago
Location
- Location within Friuli-Venezia Giulia Location within Northern Italy Location within Italy

Monfalcone railway station (Italian: Stazione di Monfalcone) serves the town and comune of Monfalcone, in the autonomous region of Friuli-Venezia Giulia, northeastern Italy.

Opened in 1860, the station is a junction between the Venice–Trieste railway and the Udine–Trieste railway.

The station is currently managed by Rete Ferroviaria Italiana (RFI). However, the commercial area of the passenger building is managed by Centostazioni. The train services are operated by Trenitalia. Each of these companies is a subsidiary of Ferrovie dello Stato Italiane (FS), Italy's state-owned rail company.

== Location ==
Monfalcone railway station is situated at Piazza della Stazione, at the northeastern edge of the town centre.

== History ==
The station became operational on 1 October 1860, upon the opening of the Galleria–Cormons section of the Udine–Trieste railway. On 11 June 1894, the station was connected with that of Cervignano, thus completing the Venice–Trieste railway from Venice via Portogruaro.

== Features ==
Services inside the station include ticketing, ticket machines, a lounge, a bar and a kiosk.

== Passenger and train movements ==
The station is a transit stop for all regional trains on the Venice–Trieste railway and the Udine–Trieste railway.

The movement of passengers at the station is about 1.7 million people per year, making Monfalcone the fourth busiest station in Friuli-Venezia Giulia in terms of numbers of passengers, after Udine, Trieste Centrale and Pordenone.

== Train services ==
The station is served by the following service(s):

- High speed services (Frecciarossa) Turin - Milan - Verona - Padua - Venice - Trieste
- Intercity services Rome - Florence - Bologna - Padua - Venice - Trieste
- Night train (Intercity Notte) Rome - Bologna - Venice - Udine - Trieste
- Express services (Regionale Veloce) Venice - Portogruaro - Cervignano del Friuli - Trieste
- Express services (Regionale Veloce) Venice - Treviso - Udine - Gorizia - Trieste
- Regional services (Treno regionale) Venice - Treviso - Udine - Gorizia - Trieste
- Regional services (Treno regionale) Tarvisio - Carnia - Gemona del Friuli - Udine - Cervignano del Friuli - Trieste

== See also ==
- History of rail transport in Italy
- List of railway stations in Friuli-Venezia Giulia
- Rail transport in Italy
- Railway stations in Italy
