= Tarvisio–Udine railway =

Railway line in Italy

Overview
- Native name: Ferrovia Tarvisio-Udine
- Line number: 62
- Termini: State border; Udine railway station
- Stations: 10

Service
- Type: heavy rail
- Operator: Rete Ferroviaria Italiana

History
- Opened: 1875

Technical
- Line length: 94.250 km (58.564 mi)
- Number of tracks: 2 (State border–P.M. Vat); 1 (P.M. Vat–Udine)
- Track gauge: 1,435 mm (4 ft 8 1/2 in) standard gauge
- Electrification: 3 kV DC, overhead line
- Operating speed: 180 km/h (110 mph)

Tarvisio–Udine railway is an Italian railway line that connects Udine and Tarvisio. It is also called the ferrovia Pontebbana in Italian after the town of Pontebba, which was located near the former border between Italy and Austria-Hungary during the first thirty years of its operation.

== History ==
In the 1850s, proposals were made in the Austrian Empire for the building of a railway line from Bruck an der Mur, located on the Austrian Southern Railway (German: Südbahn), passing through Villach, Tarvisio and Udine to facilitate connections between Vienna and Venice. The Venice–Udine railway, completed in 1860, was also built as part of this plan.

Villach was connected to the Southern Railway by the Innichen–Maribor railway (Drautalbahn) in 1864. It was planned to extend this line to Franzensfeste (Fortezza) on the Brenner Railway, and it was also planned to connect Villach to Leoben and Bruck an der Mur via the projected Rudolf Railway (Rudolfsbahn). In this context, the possibility was studied of creating a connection between Vienna and Trieste as an alternative to the Semmering line that could also be used for a route between Innsbruck and the Port of Trieste. Two projects were developed:

- the Udine line (German: Udine-Bahn), which would have crossed the Alpine watershed at the saddle of Camporosso and then descended to Udine and connected to Monfalcone via a new railway passing through Cervignano;
- the Predil line (German: Predil-Bahn), which would have crossed the watershed at the Predil Pass and would have connected to the Udine–Trieste railway at Gorizia.

With the passage of the provinces of Veneto and Udine to Italy after the Third War of Independence, the Udine line project was temporarily set aside in favour of the Predil line.

Section	Opened
Udine–Gemona del Friuli	15 November 1875
Gemona del Friuli–Carnia	18 December 1876
Carnia–Resiutta	7 May 1877
Resiutta–Chiusaforte	12 September 1878
Chiusaforte–Pontebba	25 July 1879
Pontebba–Tarvisio	11 October 1879

== Construction ==
At the instigation of the Società per le Ferrovie dell'Alta Italia (SFAI), which had same shareholders as the Southern Railway (operating the Austrian part of the Udine–Trieste railway), Italy and the Austro-Hungarian Empire agreed for the construction of a railway line between Udine and Tarvisio. This railway would follow the Udine route, passing through Gemona del Friuli and Pontebba, near which the border crossing would be located.

The construction of the Italian section line was entrusted to the SFAI and the Austrian section to the k.k.p. Kronprinz Rudolf Bahn (KRB), which already operated the Rudolf Railway.

The whole line was opened on 30 October 1879. Several sections were opened in succession between 1875 and 1879. The section between Udine and Gemona del Friuli was opened on 15 November del 1875, while Carnia station was reached on 18 December of the following year. Then it was the turn of Resiutta, reached on 17 May 1877, and of Chiusaforte, reached on 14 March 1878. The Chiusaforte–Pontebba section was opened on 25 July 1879, while the 24.7 km Austrian section was opened on 11 October of the same year.

=== First years of operations ===
In 1884, Austria-Hungary nationalised the lines of the KRB so that the operation of the Austrian part of the railway passed to the Imperial Royal Austrian State Railways (Kaiserlich-königliche österreichische Staatsbahnen, KkStb).

The following year, following the Railway Convention of 1885, (Note: Law of 27 April 1885, no. 3048 3048 "for the operation of the Mediterranean, Adriatic and Sicilian networks and for the operation of complementary railways".) the Italian section became part of the Rete Adriatica (Adriatic Network), operated by the Società Italiana per le Strade Ferrate Meridionali. In 1905, the operation of the line was taken over by the Ferrovie dello Stato.

=== After the First World War ===
In 1919, the Treaty of Saint-Germain-en-Laye established the border between Italy and Austria beyond the Alpine watershed, near Tarvisio. The local station, which was initially called Tarvisio Sobborghi and then Tarvisio Centrale, became a border station and the control of the Pontafel (Italian: Pontebba)–Tarvisio section passed to Ferrovie dello Stato.

From January 1944, all direct railway lines between Italy and Germany were bombed, except for the Tarvisio–Udine railway, as some key bridges (Dogna and Muro) on it were difficult to target. From 8 September 1944, the border station was abolished and the line became the only connection between Italy and Germany and was used by all the trains carrying prisoners bound for the extermination camps as well as supply trains.

=== After the Second World War ===
Upgrading work was carried out on the line in the 1960s; in particular, new passenger buildings were erected in the stations of Tarvisio Centrale and Pontebba, and in the latter the freight facilities were doubled in capacity. The new works were opened in November 1969.

In the last quarter of the twentieth century the whole line was rebuilt with the old single-track and winding line replaced by a double-track line with better curves. The new line was opened in stages from 1985 to 2000. Most of the new line north of Carnia opened in 2000 runs through long tunnels.

== Features ==
The railway infrastructure is managed by the Rete Ferroviaria Italiana, which classifies it as one of its primary lines. This importance is due to the role of connection between Italy and Austria, since it connects to the Rudolf Railway in Tarvisio Boscoverde, allowing connections to Villach, Klagenfurt, Vienna and Linz.

The line is double-track from the Vat crossing loop (Posto di Movimento Vat, PM Vat) to Tarvisio Boscoverde, while it is single-track on the short initial section. Electrification is at 3,000 volts DC. The gauge is 1,435 mm (4 ft 8 1/2 in) standard gauge.

Since 2000, it has been substantially rebuilt with the opening of the new section from Carnia to Tarvisio, most of which in the tunnel, Subsequently the old single-track and tortuous line and all its stations were dismantled. The only part of the old line preserved is at Pontebba station.

The PM Vat–Tarvisio Boscoverde section is equipped with Sistema di Comando e Controllo ("Command and Control System", an Italian form of centralised traffic control), so circulation is regulated by an operations centre manager at Venezia Mestre. The P.M. Vat–Udine section is also regulated by the operations centre manager at Venezia Mestre.

The line connects with other lines at both ends (Tarvisio and Udine) and the line to Sacile branches off in Gemona del Friuli.

== Route ==
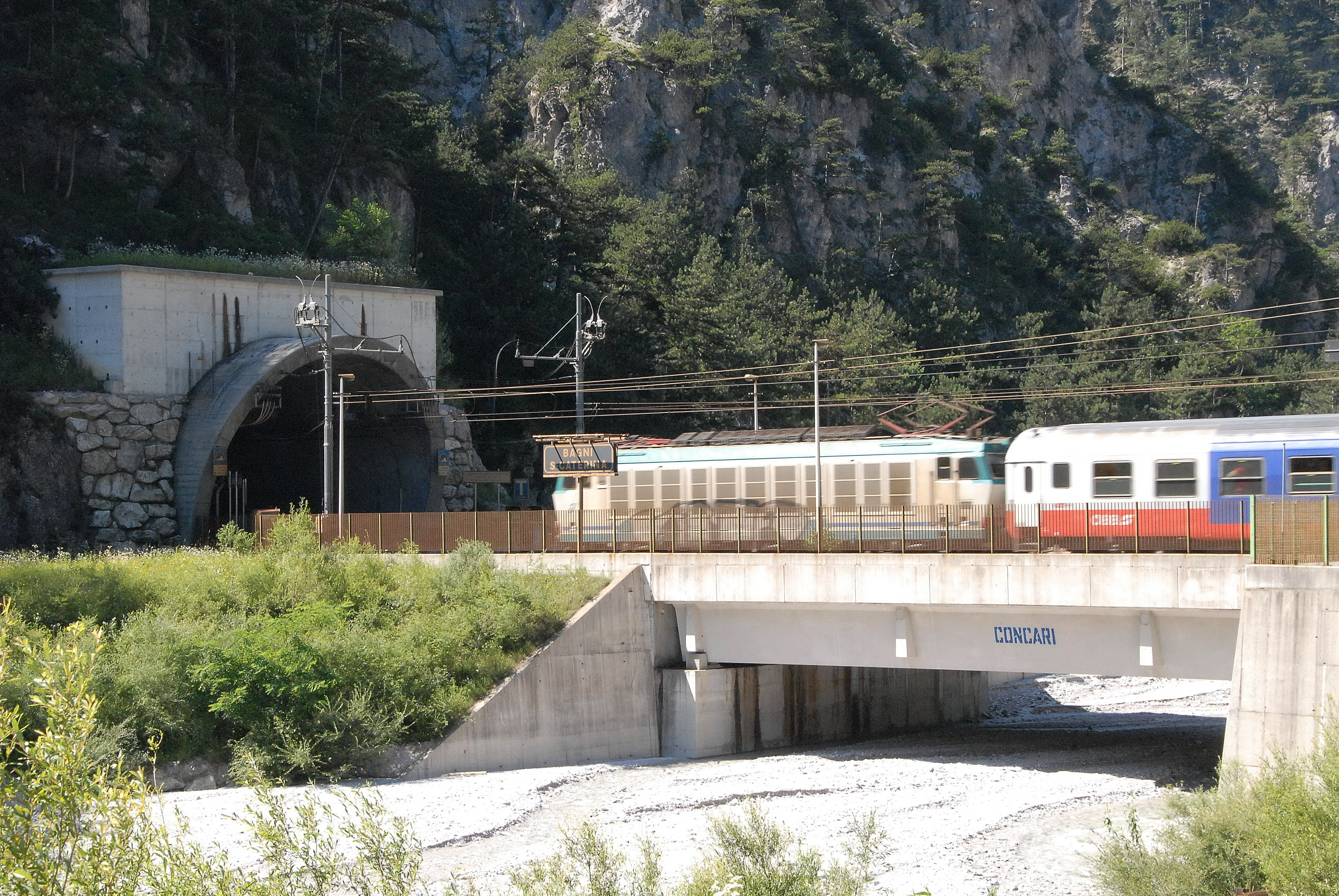
A train passing through Bagni Santa Caterina on the new line

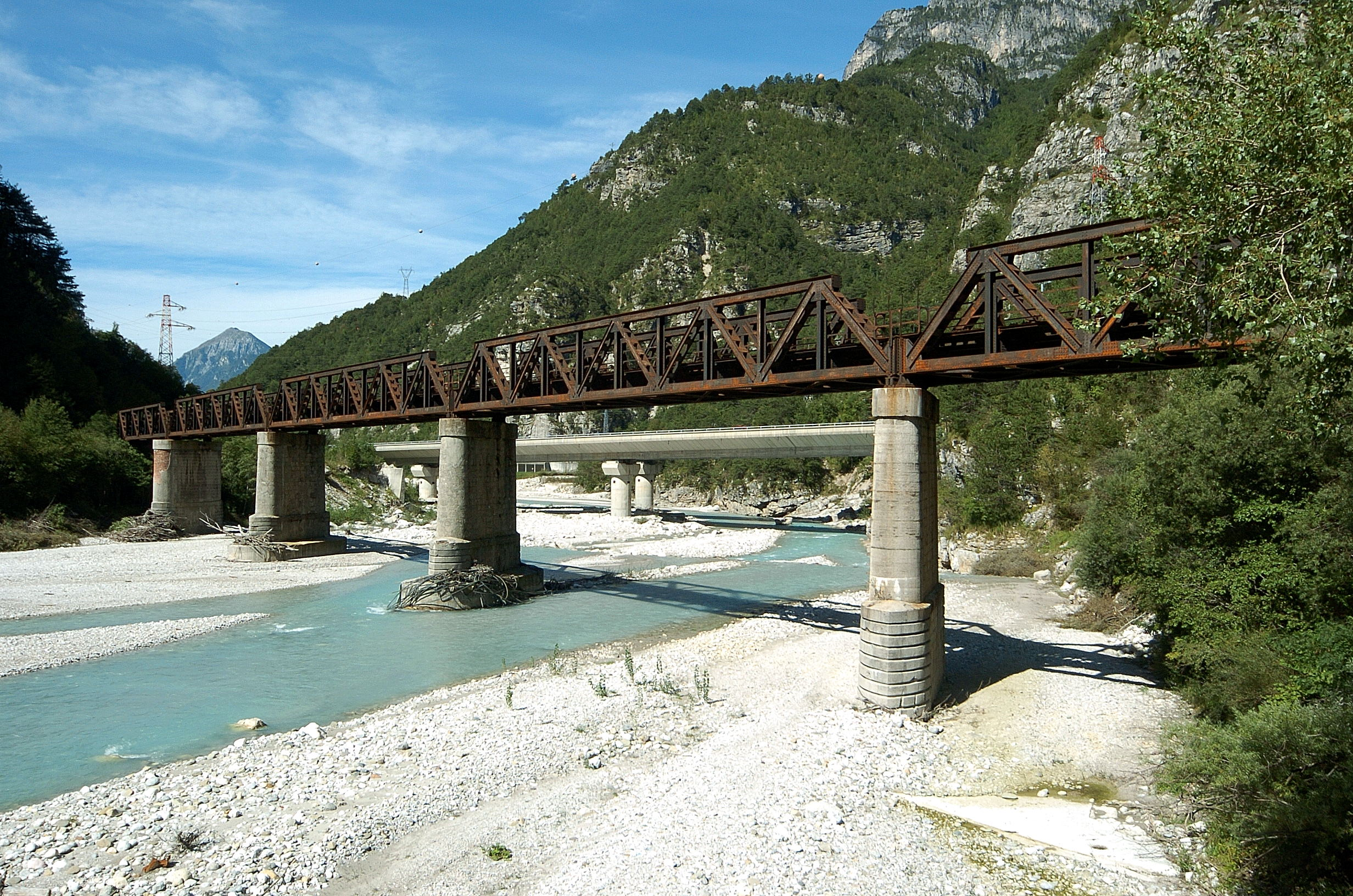
Ponteperaria bridge on the old line near Chiusaforte

From Udine to Carnia, the line basically follows the same route that existed before 1995, while from Carnia to Tarvisio it has been completely rebuilt, coinciding with the old line only at Pontebba station.

In the first of these sections there is a deviation, built in 1985, in the area of Tricesimo, which led to the abandonment of Tricesimo station in favour of the nearest station of Tricesimo-San Pelagio. The doubling of the track in the northern section of this deviation involved, among other things, the demolition of the overpass of the Udine–Tarcento electric tramway. A deviation was built between Gemona del Friuli and Carnia in 1992, which replaced the stations of Gemona-Ospedaletto (already closed in 1962) and Venzone, which were replaced by the new Venzone station.

From Carnia the railway runs along a short straight viaduct, subsequently entering the Campiolo-Palis tunnel, at the exit of which follows a very short viaduct and a second tunnel, located under Mount Zuc dal Bor, which ends near Pontebba.

At the Pontebba goods yard there are the remains of the buildings of the large customs office, used until the European Single Market entered into force in 1993. The system of tracks has been reduced to four tracks, three of which are reserved for passenger services.

From Pontebba the line enters another tunnel and emerges at the halt of Bagni Santa Caterina, which was abandoned in 2003. The railway enters a tunnel to Ugovizza-Valbruna station, which replaces the former Ugovizza and Valbruna stations, but is far from both villages. The route of the tunnel between Pontebba and Ugovizza-Valbruna follows a sort of "M", coming out into the open only in the middle of the M, near Bagni S. Caterina.

After Ugovizza-Valbruna, the line enters the tunnel again, bypassing the towns of Camporosso and Tarvisio and ends at the new Tarvisio Boscoverde station. This station has been active since 2000 replacing the former Tarvisio Centrale station, which it lies parallel to, about 500 metres away. The original Tarvisio station, which stood in a better position to serve the town, has not been restored, as the railway passes through a tunnel in the Tarvisio area. After Tarvisio Boscoverde, the line connects at the Austrian border with the Rudolf Railway, which continues to Villach.

The old line, on the other hand, followed the course of the Fella river. It was equipped with many viaducts and bridges of great scenic interest and ran through all the towns along the river. It was replaced because it was subject to landslides and floods and because, being single-track, it was no longer adequate for the freight traffic that had been developing.

Only one, approximately two kilometres-long, single-track section remains, between Udine station and the Vat crossing loop; the Udine belt railway, branches off to the south from the latter, allowing the passage of freight trains to Cervignano and Gorizia without entering Udine station.

== Traffic ==
=== Freight ===
Freight traffic is intense; in particular, trains from Austria continue towards the ports of Trieste or Venice.

=== Passengers ===
The regional service consists of some Trenitalia services running between Tarvisio Boscoverde and Udine as well as two pairs of services on the Udine–Villach cross-border route, carried out by a collaboration between the Società Ferrovie Udine-Cividale, which supplies the locomotives, and the ÖBB which provides the carriages, as part of the Micotra service.

There are also various international connections operated by the ÖBB with the use of its own rolling stock, while the driving and traction staff on Italian territory is provided by Trenord for EC/EN trains and Trenitalia for EN 234/235 trains:

- two pairs of Eurocity operated with Railjet sets (131-130 and 133-132) between Venice and Vienna, which do not carry passenger services within Italian territory but only to/from Austria;
- one pair of EuroNight services (236/237) between Venice and Vienna;
- one pair of Euronight services between Livorno/Florence and Vienna, with an extension to Munich;
- one pair of Euronight services (234/235) between Rome/Milan and Vienna.

In addition, the ÖBB also maintains a bus service, called Intercitybus, which connects Venezia Mestre station and Udine to Klagenfurt and Villach. The service to Villach connects with trains to Salzburg and Vienna.

Previously the number of international connections was greater: the Eurocity Allegro Johann Strauss, which connected Venezia Santa Lucia to Vienna Südbahnhof and was the last daytime connection between Italy and Austria using the Pontebbana, was discontinued in 2009. In order to restore a daytime service between Friuli-Venezia Giulia and Carinthia, the two local administrations activated in 2012 an experimental service between Udine and Villach called "Miglioramento dei collegamenti transfrontalieri di trasporto pubblico" (Micotra, "improvement of cross-border public transport connections"). Then, from the timetable change of 15 December 2013, the ÖBB restored a pair of EuroCity services on the Venice –Vienna route. A second pair of EuroCity services between Venice and Vienna was reintroduced starting from the timetable change on 10 December 2017.

== See also ==
- List of railway lines in Italy
- Udine-Tarcento Tramway
