= Tarvisio Boscoverde railway station =

Railway station in Italy

Tarvisio Boscoverde
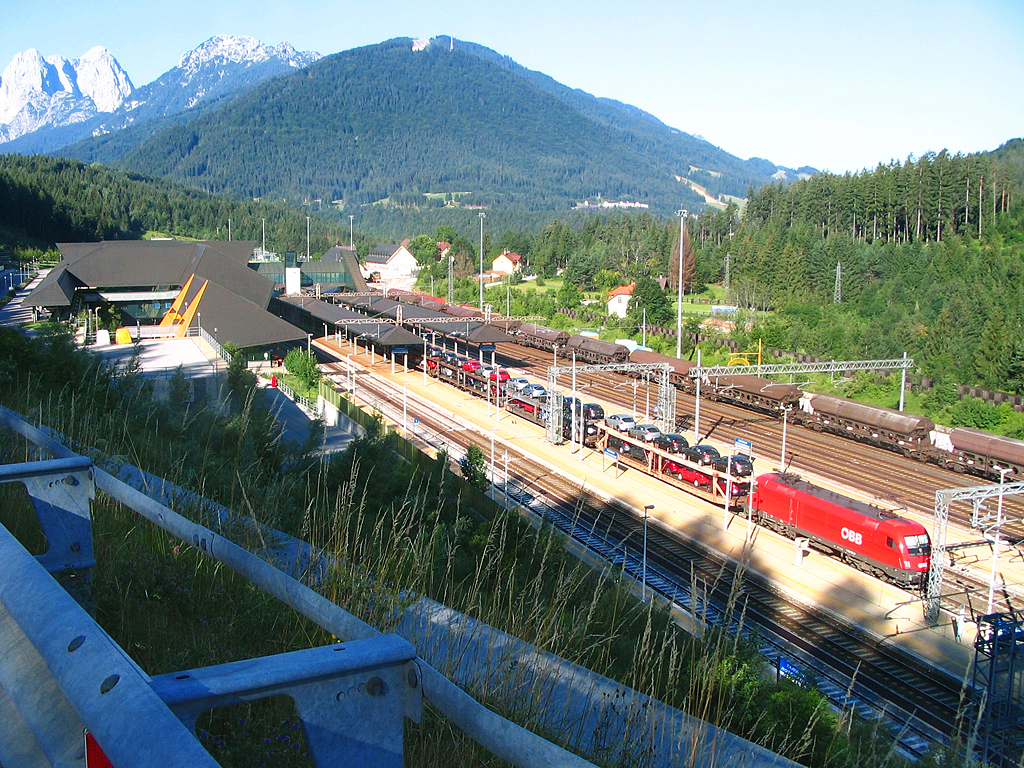
- Tarvisio Boscoverde railway station

General information
- Location: loc. Nuova Stazione, Tarvisio, Friuli-Venezia Giulia; Italy
- Coordinates: 46°30′22″N 13°36′26″E
- Elevation: 745 m (2,444 ft)
- System: Railway Station
- Owner: Rete Ferroviaria Italiana
- Operator: Trenitalia; ÖBB
- Lines: Tarvisio–Udine railway Rudolf Railway (St. Valentin-Tarvisio)
- Distance: 88.790 km (55.172 mi) from Udine
- Platforms: 5

Other information
- Classification: Silver

History
- Opened: 26 November 2000; 25 years ago
Location
- Location within Friuli-Venezia Giulia Location within Northern Italy Location within Italy

Tarvisio Boscoverde (Italian: Stazione di Tarvisio Boscoverde) is a railway station serving the town of Tarvisio, in the region of Friuli-Venezia Giulia, in Northern Italy. The station is managed by Rete Ferroviaria Italiana (RFI). Train services are operated by Trenitalia and ÖBB.

== History ==
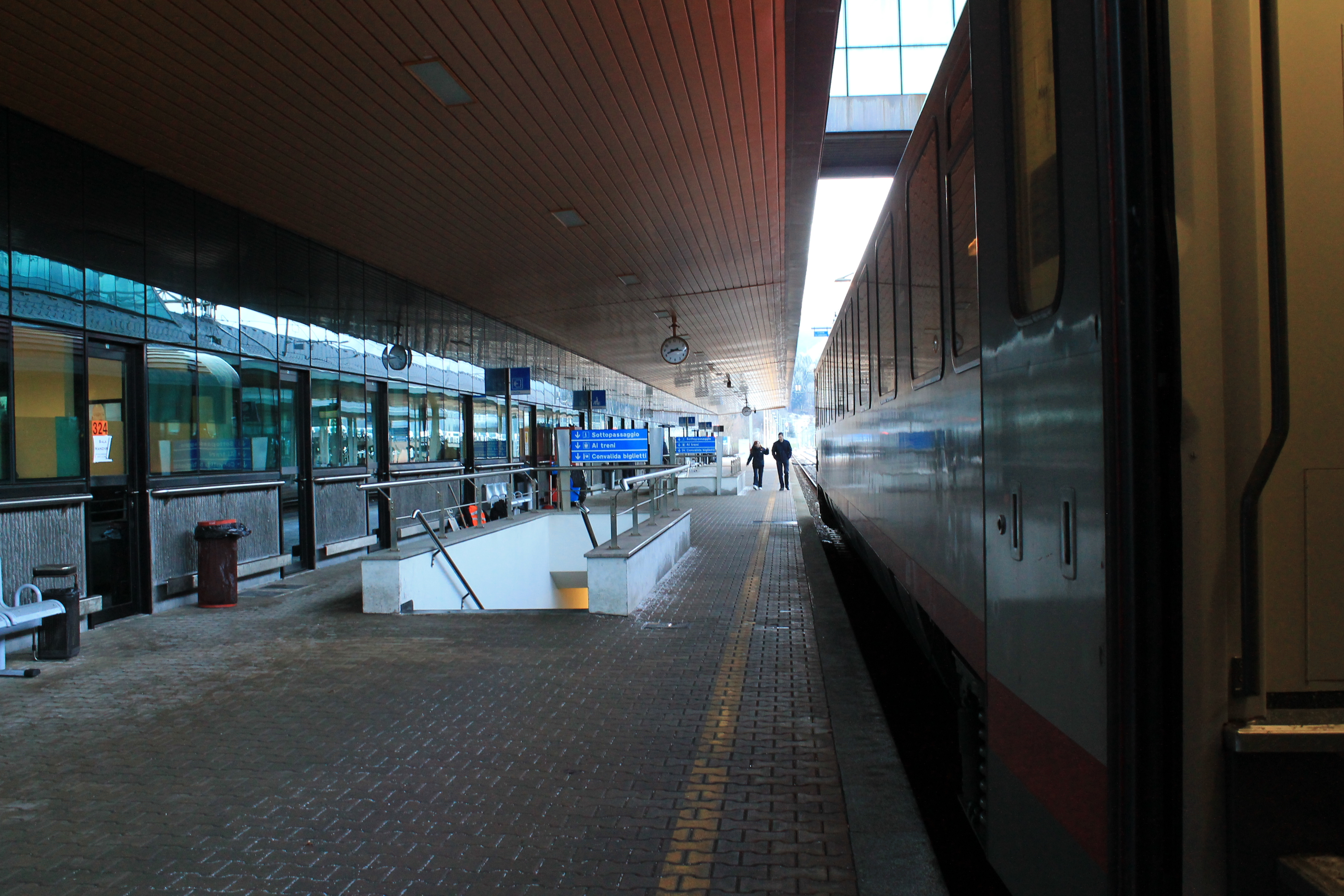
Platform

The station opened on 26 November 2000 as the current northern terminus of the rebuilt Alpine Pontebbana line from Udine railway station. From Tarvisio, the Rudolf Railway runs northwards across the border with Austria towards Villach Hauptbahnhof and the Southern Railway main line.

The station replaced the former Tarvisio Centrale and Tarvisio Città railway stations, opened in 1879. Tarvisio Centrale is still used as a terminus for bus services from Udine. The former Tarvisio–Ljubljana Railway to Jesenice railway station in Slovenia has been closed to traffic since 1967.

== Train services ==
The station is served the following international service(s):

- Intercity services (RailJet) Vienna - Klagenfurt - Villach - Udine - Treviso - Venice
- Night train (Nightjet) Vienna - Villach - Venice - Bologna - Rome
- Night train (Nightjet) Vienna - Villach - Venice - Verona - Milan
- Night train (Nightjet) Stuttgart - Munich - Salzburg - / Vienna - Linz - Salzburg - Villach - Tarvisio - Udine - Treviso - Venice

as well as by regional rail:

- Regional services (REX) Villach - Tarvisio - Carnia - Gemona del Friuli - Udine
- Regional services (Treno regionale) Tarvisio - Carnia - Gemona del Friuli - Udine - Cervignano del Friuli - Trieste

Preceding station	Trenitalia	Following station
Udine towards Venezia Santa Lucia	Railjet	Villach Hbf towards Wien Hbf
Ugovizza-Valbruna towards Udine	Regional-Express	Thörl-Maglern towards Villach Hbf
Ugovizza-Valbruna towards Trieste Centrale	Regionale	Terminus
Preceding station	ÖBB	Following station
Padova towards La Spezia Centrale	Nightjet	Villach Hbf towards Wien Hbf
Bologna Centrale towards Roma Termini	Nightjet	Villach Hbf towards Wien Hbf
Padova towards La Spezia Centrale	Nightjet	Villach Hbf towards München Hbf
Bologna Centrale towards Roma Termini	Nightjet	Villach Hbf towards München Hbf
Villach Hbf towards Stuttgart Hbf	Nightjet	Udine towards Venezia Santa Lucia

== Bus services ==
- Tarvisio Boscoverde - Tarvisio Citta

== See also ==
- History of rail transport in Italy
- List of railway stations in Friuli-Venezia Giulia
- Rail transport in Italy
- Railway stations in Italy
