= Zagraj =

Zagraj may refer to:

- Zagraj, the Slovenian name for the village of Sagrado, Italy
- Zagraj, Croatia, a village near Karlovac, Croatia
