= Gruden =

Gruden is a surname, and may refer to:

- Igo Gruden (1893–1948), Slovene poet
- Jay Gruden (born 1967), American football coach
- Jon Gruden (born 1963), American football coach
- Jonathan Gruden (born 2000), American ice hockey player
- John Gruden (born 1970), American ice hockey player and coach
- Mirko Gruden (1911–1967), Italian football player
- Paula Gruden (1921–2014), Slovene-Australian poet
- Slobodanka Gruden (1940–2025) Serbian doctor, academic, and politician
