= Upper Austria S-Bahn =

Rail transport network in the Greater Linz area of Upper Austria

The Upper Austria S-Bahn (German: S-Bahn Oberösterreich) is an S-Bahn system that was introduced on 11 December 2016 in the Greater Linz area of Upper Austria. In the first step a clock-face timetable was implemented with exactly the same departure minutes and closure of clock gaps and line numbers were introduced.

== Lines ==
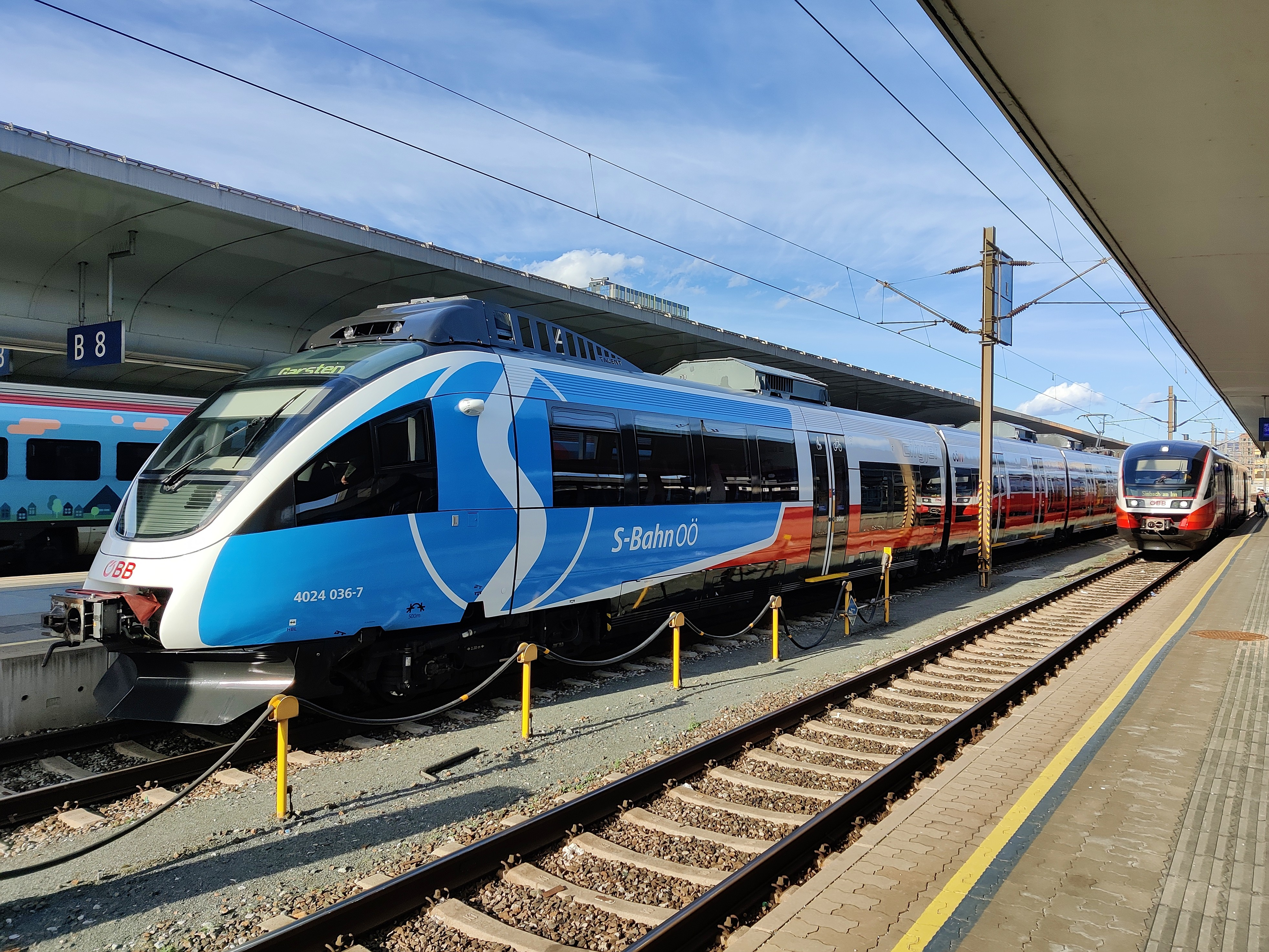
ÖBB 4024 at Linz station

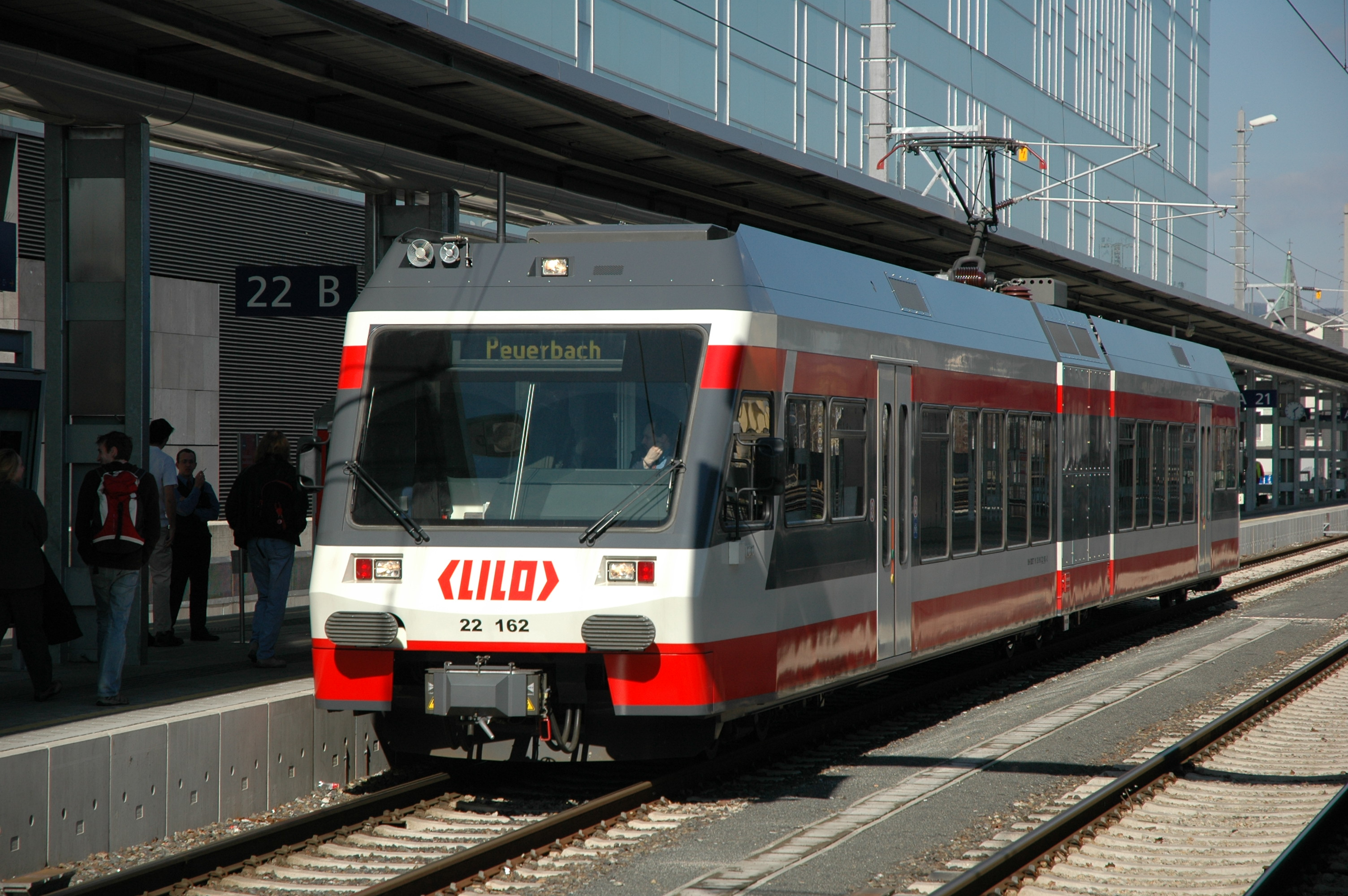
Stadler GTW train operated by Stern & Hafferl

Line	Route	Name of track	Operating company	Rolling stock	Length
Upper Austria S-Bahn	Linz Hbf — Enns — St. Valentin — Steyr — Garsten	Westbahn and Rudolfsbahn	ÖBB	4024, 4744	ca. 47 km (29 mi)
Upper Austria S-Bahn	Linz Hbf — Wels Hbf	Westbahn	ÖBB	4024, 4744	ca. 24 km (15 mi)
Upper Austria S-Bahn	Linz Hbf — Pregarten	Summerauer Bahn	ÖBB	4024, 4744	ca. 26 km (16 mi)
Upper Austria S-Bahn	Linz Hbf — Traun — Kremsmünster — Kirchdorf an der Krems	Pyhrnbahn	ÖBB	4024, 4744	ca. 51 km (32 mi)
Upper Austria S-Bahn	Linz Hbf — Eferding	Linzer Lokalbahn	Stern & Hafferl	Stadler GTW	ca. 24 km (15 mi)

== Future plans ==
The is to be extended by one station to Micheldorf.

The introduction of three more lines is planned:

- : Mühlkreisbahn: Linz main station - Rottenegg (route beyond Rottenegg not yet fixed)
- : City-Regio-Tram Linz: Linz main station - Gallneukirchen
- : City-Regio-Tram Linz: Linz main station - Pregarten
