= Sagrado railway station =

Railway station in Italy

Sagrado

General information
- Location: Via. Stazione 2, Sagrado, Friuli-Venezia Giulia; Italy
- Coordinates: 45°52′19″N 13°29′02″E
- System: Railway Station
- Owner: Rete Ferroviaria Italiana
- Operator: Trenitalia
- Line: Udine–Trieste railway
- Distance: 46.000 km (28.583 mi) from Udine
- Platforms: 2
- Tracks: 2

Other information
- Classification: Silver
Location
- Location within Friuli-Venezia Giulia Location within Northern Italy Location within Italy

Sagrado (Italian: Stazione di Sagrado) is a railway station serving the town of Sagrado, in the region of Friuli-Venezia Giulia, northern Italy. The station is located on the Udine–Trieste railway. The train services are operated by Trenitalia.

== Train services ==
The station is served by the following service(s):

- Express services (Regionale Veloce) Venice - Gorizia - Udine - Treviso - Trieste
- Regional services (Treno regionale) Venice - Gorizia - Udine - Treviso - Trieste

== See also ==
- History of rail transport in Italy
- List of railway stations in Friuli-Venezia Giulia
- Rail transport in Italy
- Railway stations in Italy
