= Pyhrn railway line =

Railway line in Austria

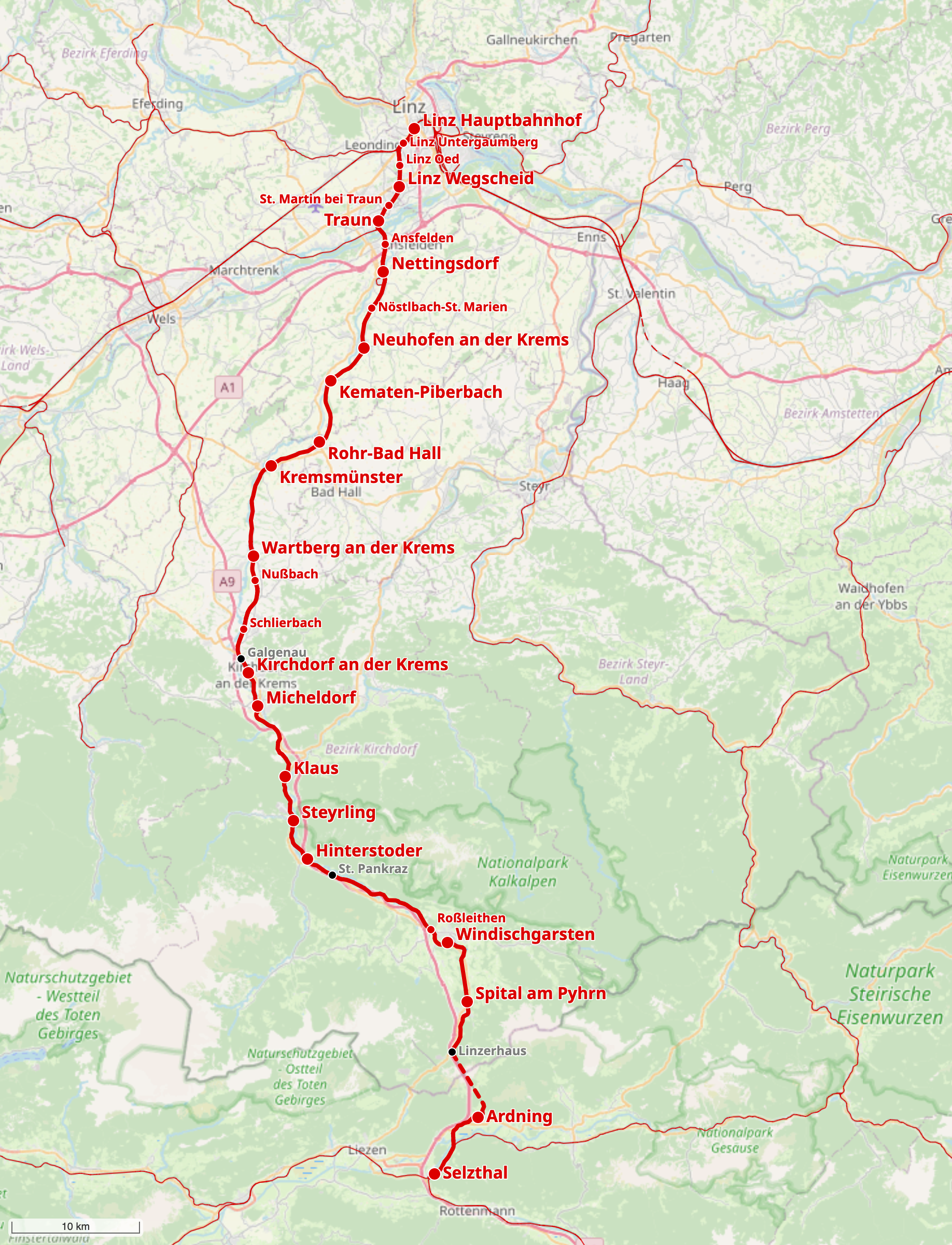

Overview
- Line number: 140
- Termini: Linz Hauptbahnhof; Selzthal

Service
- Services: InterCity

Technical
- Line length: 104.2 km (64.7 mi)
- Number of tracks: 1
- Track gauge: 1,435 mm (4 ft 8 1/2 in) standard gauge
- Electrification: 15 kV 16.7 Hz AC

The Pyhrn railway line (German: Pyhrnbahn) is a railway line in Upper Austria. It runs 104.2 kilometres (64.7 mi) from Linz Hauptbahnhof, where it connects with the Western railway line, to Selzthal, where it connects with the Enns Valley Railway and Rudolf Railway. The line takes its name from the Pyhrn Pass through which it runs.

== Route ==
The northern end of the Pyhrn railway line is at Linz Hauptbahnhof, where it runs parallel with the Western railway line (German: Westbahn). The Pyhrn railway line turns south, following first the Krems, then the Steyr, and finally the Teichl river to Selzthal. At the Pyhrn Pass at the southern end of the line, the 4,767-metre (15,640 ft) Bosruck tunnel passes underneath the Bosruck mountain. In Selzthal, the line connects with the Enns Valley Railway and Rudolf Railway.

== Operation ==
The S4 of the Upper Austria S-Bahn runs hourly between Linz Hauptbahnhof and Kirchdorf an der Krems, making all local stops. Regional-Express trains supplement the S4, running hourly between Linz and Selzthal, with some continuing to Liezen. The line also hosts some InterCity trains that run between Linz and Graz Hauptbahnhof. In addition, the express train (German: Schnellzug) ÖBB-Urlaubsexpress (lit. 'ÖBB Holiday Express') runs on weekends between Wien Hauptbahnhof and Bischofshofen.
