= Pyhrn Pass =

- Location within Alps
- Elevation: 954 metres (3,130 ft)
- Traversed by: Federal Highway B 138

Third Approach
- Location: Austria
- Range: Alps
- Coordinates: 47°37′N 14°18′E

Pyhrn Pass is a mountain pass in the Austrian Alps between the Austrian states of Upper Austria and Styria.

It connects Warscheneck and Bosruck and is at an elevation of 954 m (3,130 ft). The pass road (B 138) has a maximum grade of 10 percent.

Since the middle of the 1980s, traffic on the pass has been reduced by the opening of the Bosruck Tunnel for the A9 Pyhrn Autobahn. There has also been a railway tunnel since the nineteenth century. Since the road tunnel was built, the road has not been cleared regularly in winter, and there is a weight limit for trucking.

On the Upper Austrian side west of the pass is the summer and ski resort Wurzeralm, and east of the pass is Bosruck, which is noted for hiking and cross-country skiing.

Because the pass is a relatively low one, it has been important regionally since the Stone Age.

== See also ==
- List of highest paved roads in Europe
- List of mountain passes
