= Monfalcone =

- Comune
- Comune di Monfalcone
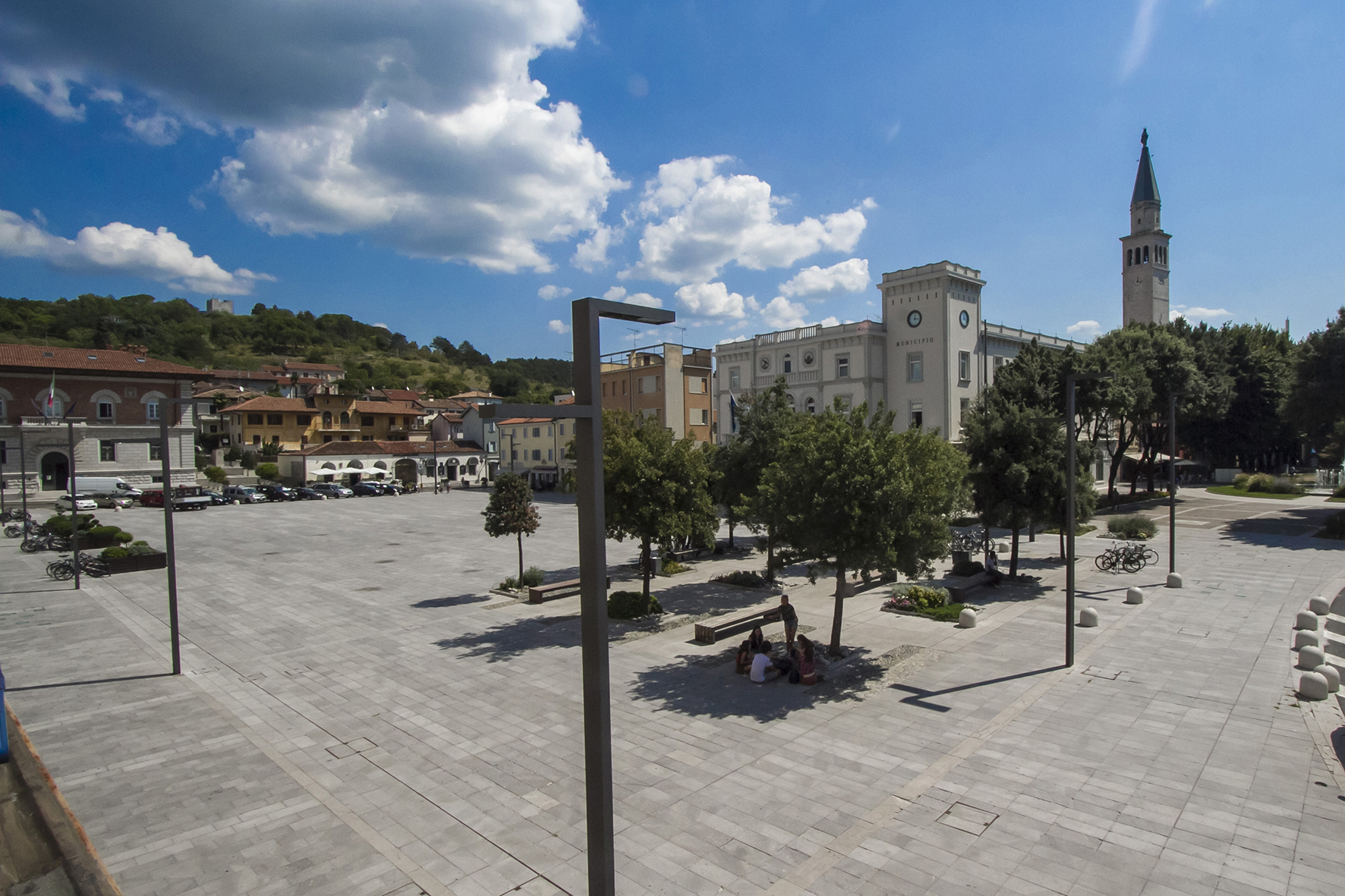
- 'Piazza della Repubblica

- Coat of arms

- Location within Italy Location within Friuli-Venezia Giulia
- Coordinates: 45°48′N 13°32′E
- Country: Italy
- Region: Friuli-Venezia Giulia
- Province: Gorizia (GO)
- Frazioni: Archi, Aris, Bagni, Cima di Pietrarossa, Crosera, La Rocca, Lisert, Marina Julia, Marina Nova, Panzano, Pietrarossa, San Polo, Schiavetti, Serraglio, Via Romana-Solvay

Government
  - Mayor: Luca Fasan

Area
  - Total: 19.73 km^{2} (7.62 sq mi)
- Elevation: 7 m (23 ft)

Population (2026)
  - Total: 30,767
  - Density: 1,559/km^{2} (4,039/sq mi)
- Demonym: Monfalconesi
- Time zone: UTC+1 (CET)
  - Summer (DST): UTC+2 (CEST)
- Postal code: 34074
- Dialing code: 0481
- ISTAT code: 031012
- Patron saint: St. Ambrose
- Saint day: November 21
- Website: Official website

Monfalcone (Italian pronunciation: [moɱfalˈkoːne]; Bisiacco: Mofalcòn; Friulian: Monfalcon; Slovene: Tržič; archaic German: Falkenberg) is a town and comune (municipality) in the Regional decentralization entity of Gorizia in the autonomous region of Friuli-Venezia Giulia in northern Italy, located on the Gulf of Trieste. Its name means 'falcon mountain' (see Montfaucon in French and Falkenberg in Germanic languages). It has 30,767 inhabitants.

It is a major industrial centre for manufacturing ships, airplanes, textiles, chemicals, and refined oil, and is home to one of Fincantieri's main shipyards. Monfalcone is the northernmost city on the Mediterranean Sea.

== History ==
In prehistoric times the area of Monfalcone housed several fortified villages called castellieri. After the foundation of the Roman city of Aquileia (181 BC), some thermal buildings were created in one of the two island known as Insulae Clarae where it was a thermal water source.

After Ostrogoth, Byzantine, Lombard, and Frankish domination, Monfalcone was controlled by the Patriarchs of Aquileia starting from 967. The Venetians conquered it in 1420 after three days of siege, keeping it until 1511, when it fell to the French. Conquered back by Venice, it was ravaged by the troops of Habsburg Emperor Maximilian I in 1513, who destroyed the Rocca fortress. In 1521 it was returned to the Republic of Venice, under which it remained until its dissolution by the 1797 Treaty of Campo Formio.

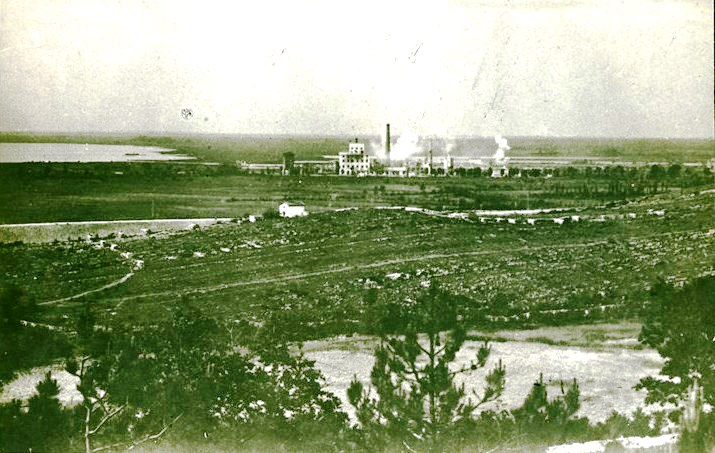
Adria factories in Monfalcone during Austrian bombing in World War I

From 1805 it was controlled by the French Empire until the fall of Napoleon in 1814, after which it was included in the Kingdom of Illyria, part of the Austrian Empire. Incorporated into the crown land of the Princely County of Gorizia and Gradisca, it belonged to the Austrian Littoral from 1849. The first shipyards arose from about 1908 onwards, among them the Cantiere Navale Triestino company building steamships for the Austro-Americana Line based in Trieste. During World War I, the town was captured by Italian forces in 1915 and became the rear line during the bloody Battles of the Isonzo, being briefly recaptured by Austria-Hungary after the 1917 Battle of Caporetto, but returning to Italy in 1918. The shipyards were severely damaged by bitter fighting and had to be rebuilt afterwards. During World War II the town was repeatedly bombed and heavily damaged, became a center of the Italian Resistance after the Armistice of Cassibile, and it was briefly occupied by Yugoslav troops at the end of the war.

== Geography ==
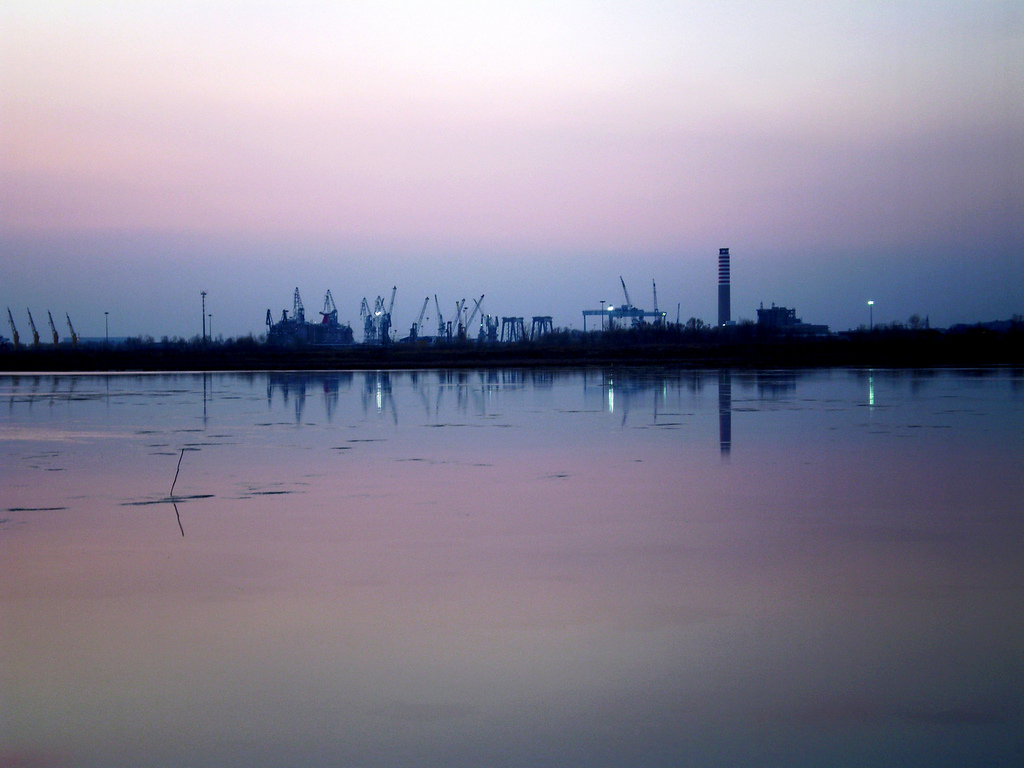
Monfalcone port

Monfalcone is the fifth most populous town in Friuli-Venezia Giulia and the main centre of Bisiacaria territory. Joined to its neighbourhoods, it has about 50,000 inhabitants. The town lies between the Karst hills and the Adriatic coast, and it is the northernmost port of the Mediterranean Sea.

The municipality extends along the northern coastal strip of the Adriatic Sea for 24.39 km and is enclosed to the south by the bay of Panzano and to the north-east by the Carso, while to the north-west it borders the municipalities of Ronchi dei Legionari and Staranzano. From a seismic point of view, the municipal territory is located, according to the Civil Protection classification, in zone 3 subject to low seismicity.

=== Climate ===
Climate data for Monfalcone (Ronchi dei Legionari) (1991–2020)
Month	Jan	Feb	Mar	Apr	May	Jun	Jul	Aug	Sep	Oct	Nov	Dec	Year
Mean daily maximum °C (°F)	8.9 (48.0)	10.5 (50.9)	14.5 (58.1)	18.5 (65.3)	23.1 (73.6)	27.2 (81.0)	29.6 (85.3)	29.7 (85.5)	24.6 (76.3)	19.4 (66.9)	14.0 (57.2)	9.8 (49.6)	19.2 (66.5)
Daily mean °C (°F)	4.1 (39.4)	5.0 (41.0)	8.7 (47.7)	12.6 (54.7)	17.3 (63.1)	21.2 (70.2)	23.4 (74.1)	23.4 (74.1)	18.8 (65.8)	14.1 (57.4)	9.3 (48.7)	5.0 (41.0)	13.6 (56.4)
Mean daily minimum °C (°F)	−0.6 (30.9)	−0.4 (31.3)	2.8 (37.0)	6.8 (44.2)	11.4 (52.5)	15.2 (59.4)	17.2 (63.0)	17.1 (62.8)	13.0 (55.4)	8.7 (47.7)	4.5 (40.1)	0.2 (32.4)	8.0 (46.4)
Average precipitation mm (inches)	69.6 (2.74)	69.4 (2.73)	77.1 (3.04)	124.8 (4.91)	139.5 (5.49)	108.6 (4.28)	93.4 (3.68)	102.7 (4.04)	111.6 (4.39)	168.4 (6.63)	170.5 (6.71)	92.8 (3.65)	1,328.4 (52.29)
Source: Istituto Superiore per la Protezione e la Ricerca Ambientale

== Demographics ==
Historical population
Year	Pop.	±%
1921	10,863	—
1931	17,992	+65.6%
1936	19,634	+9.1%
1951	24,589	+25.2%
1961	26,818	+9.1%
1971	29,655	+10.6%
1981	30,259	+2.0%
1991	27,223	−10.0%
2001	26,393	−3.0%
2011	27,041	+2.5%
2021	29,072	+7.5%
Source: ISTAT

As of 2026, the population is 30,767, of which 52.5% are males, and 47.5% are females. Minors make up 17.6% of the population, and seniors make up 22.3%.

=== Immigration ===
As of 2025, immigrants make up 33.4% of the population. The 5 largest foreign countries of birth are Bangladesh, making up 49.4% of all immigrants, followed by Romania, Bosnia and Herzegovina, North Macedonia, and Croatia.

Foreign-born population (2025)
Country of birth	Population
Bangladesh	5,012
Romania	1,221
Bosnia and Herzegovina	582
North Macedonia	437
Croatia	370
Albania	239
Moldova	161
Ukraine	153
Serbia	147
China	129
Slovenia	98
Kosovo	94
Senegal	92
Morocco	88
Tunisia	80

== Sights ==
- Rocca fortress. Of medieval origin (according to a legend, it was founded by Theoderic the Great, King of the Ostrogoths), its current appearance dates to Venetian restorations in the early 16th century. The interior houses a speleology exhibition.
- World War I Open air museum
- Karst area
- Saint Ambrose's Cathedral
- Roman villas and thermae: Several remains of Roman villas have been found on the territory of the municipality of Monfalcone. The sites are object of archaeological research but are not open to public. A thermae dating back to the Roman era is also present and what remains of the ancient edifice is now included in the current thermal establishment that was reactivated in 2014.

== Transport ==
Monfalcone is served by regionally and nationally important roads, spanning a total of nearly 100 km. The S.S. 14 of Venezia Giulia and the A4 highway pass through the city, allowing access to the toll booths.

- Monfalcone West - Redipuglia
- Monfalcone East - Trieste Lisert

Monfalcone railway station, opened in 1860, is a junction between the Venice–Trieste railway and the Udine–Trieste railway.

The construction and design records of the ships produced in Monfalcone Shipyard Number 1 from 1909 - 1967 have been preserved in the Fondo Egone Missio Archives (Egone Missio Archives).

Monfalcone is home to the northernmost commercial port in the Adriatic, the Mediterranean and Italy, making it the second largest regional port and the hub for unloading goods destined for all of Europe. The Port of Monfalcone is thus a diverse port, with a de facto specialization in the automotive market, whose traffic is growing. It operates in close synergy with the Port of Trieste, as both are part of the Eastern Adriatic Port System Authority.[1]

== Controversies ==
In 2024 religious, cultural and ethnic factors gained importance with Cricket being banned in the town. Collective prayer was briefly banned in two Islamic Centres. The order was later annulled by the regional court.

== Notable people ==
- Enrico Toti (1882–1916), cyclist, was killed in the Sixth Battle of the Isonzo in Monfalcone
- Antonio Sant'Elia (1888–1916), architect, was killed in the Eighth Battle of the Isonzo in Monfalcone
- Filippo Zappata (1894–1994), engineer, worked in Monfalcone
- Mirko Gruden (1911–1967), footballer
- Gino Paoli (1934–2026), singer-songwriter
- Paolo Rossi (born 1953), actor
- Mo-Do (Fabio Frittelli; 1966–2013), musician
- Stefano Zoff (born 1966), boxer
- Massimiliano Versace (born 1972), scientist
- Elisa Toffoli (born 1977), singer-songwriter, grew up in Monfalcone

== International relations ==
=== Twin towns – sister cities ===
Monfalcone is twinned with:

- Neumarkt in Steiermark, Austria
- Gallipoli, Italy
- Karadeniz Ereğli, Turkey
- Zonguldak, Turkey
