= Rudolf Railway =

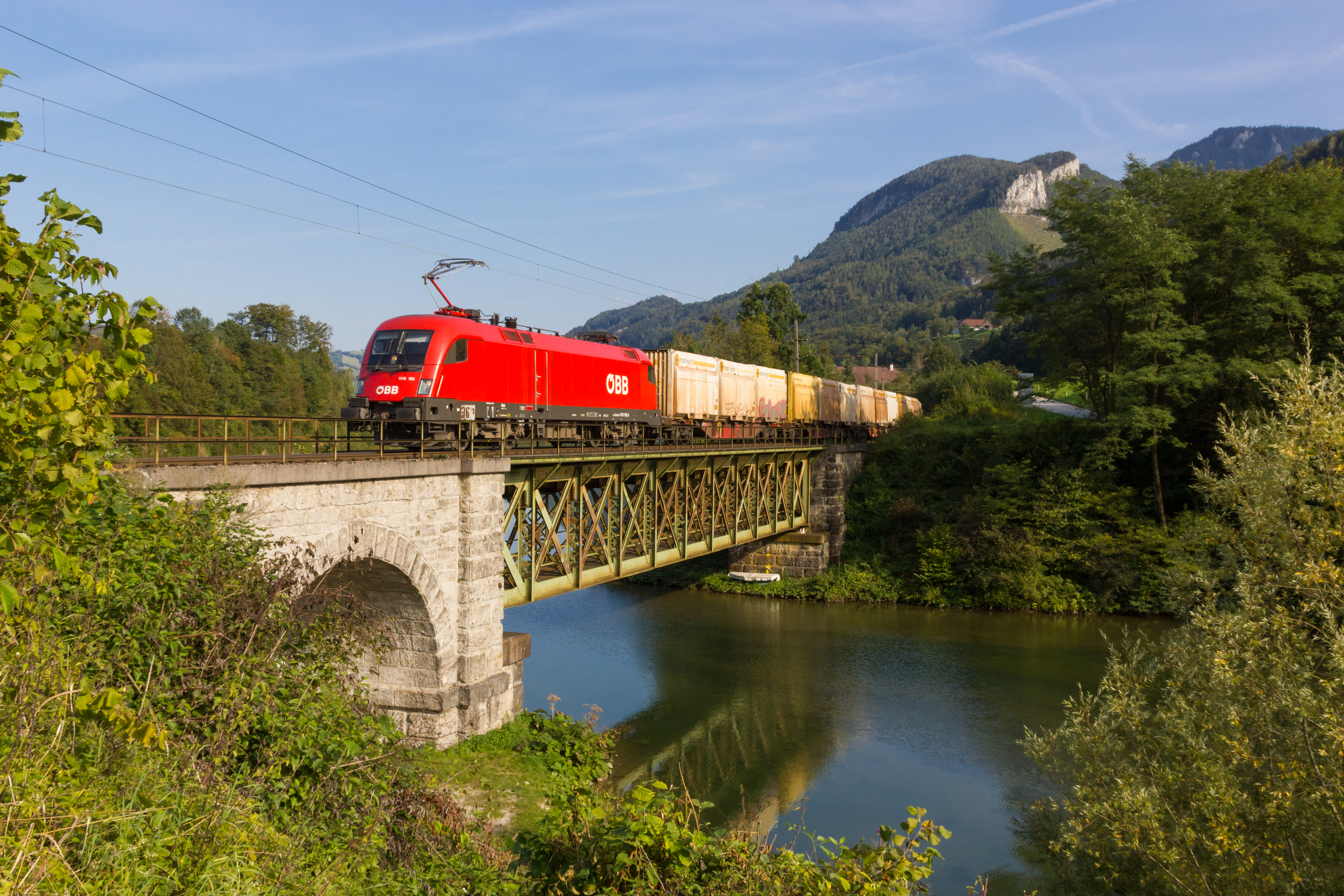
- Freight train with containers of timber near Trattenbach

Overview
- Line number: 101 02 (Amstetten–Abzw Amstetten 11); 102 01 (Abzw Amstetten 11–Kastenreith); 203 01 (St. Valentin–Abzw Weyer 1); 404 01 (Selzthal–St. Michael); 413 13 (St. Michael–St. Michael-West); 413 01 (St. Michael-West–St. Veit an der Glan); 408 01 (St. Veit an der Glan–Villach Hbf-Ostbf); 413 01 (Villach Süd Gvbf-Auen–Tarvisio Boscov.); 413 12 (St. Michael–St. Michael-Ost); 413 01 (St. Michael-Ost–Abzw Leoben Hbf 2); 416 01 (Leoben Hbf 2 junction–Leoben Hbf); 413 14 (Villach Hbf-Ostbf–Villach Süd Gvbf-Auen)

Service
- Route number: 130 (Amstetten–Selzthal); 131 (St. Valentin–Selzthal); 250 (Selzthal–St. Michael); 600 (St. Michael/Leoben–St. Veit an der Glan); and (Villach–Tarvisio Boscoverde); 601 (Friesach–Villach)

Technical
- Line length: (St. Valentin–Tarvisio) 407 km (253 mi); (Amstetten−Kastenreith) 43.8 km (27.2 mi); (St. Michael−Leoben) 11.9 km (7.4 mi)
- Number of tracks: 2: Selzthal Süd – St. Veit an der Glan; 2: Villach – Tarvisio Boscoverde
- Track gauge: 1,435 mm (4 ft 8 1/2 in) standard gauge
- Minimum radius: 187 m (614 ft)
- Electrification: 15 kV 16.7 Hz AC
- Operating speed: 160 km/h (99 mph) (max)
- Maximum incline: 2.28%

The Rudolf Railway (German: Rudolfsbahn) refers to a railway in Austria connecting Amstetten and the Italian border near Tarvisio, along with a branch from Kastenreith to St. Valentine. Its name is derived from the k.k. priv. Kronprinz Rudolf-Bahn Gesellschaft (Imperial–royal, "privileged"—by the grant of a concession—Crown Prince Rudolf Railway Company, KRB). The main line, which was opened from 1868 to 1873, ran on the St. Valentin–Kastenreith–Kleinreifling–Selzthal–Schoberpass–St. Michael–Neumarkt saddle–St. Veit an der Glan–Feldkirchen in Kärnten–Villach–Tarvisio Centrale route. The section of the line within the current borders of Italy now runs over the new Tarvisio–Udine railway (opened in November 2000) through Tarvisio Boscoverde. It replaced a very windy route to Udine that originally formed part of the Rudolf Railway.

== History ==
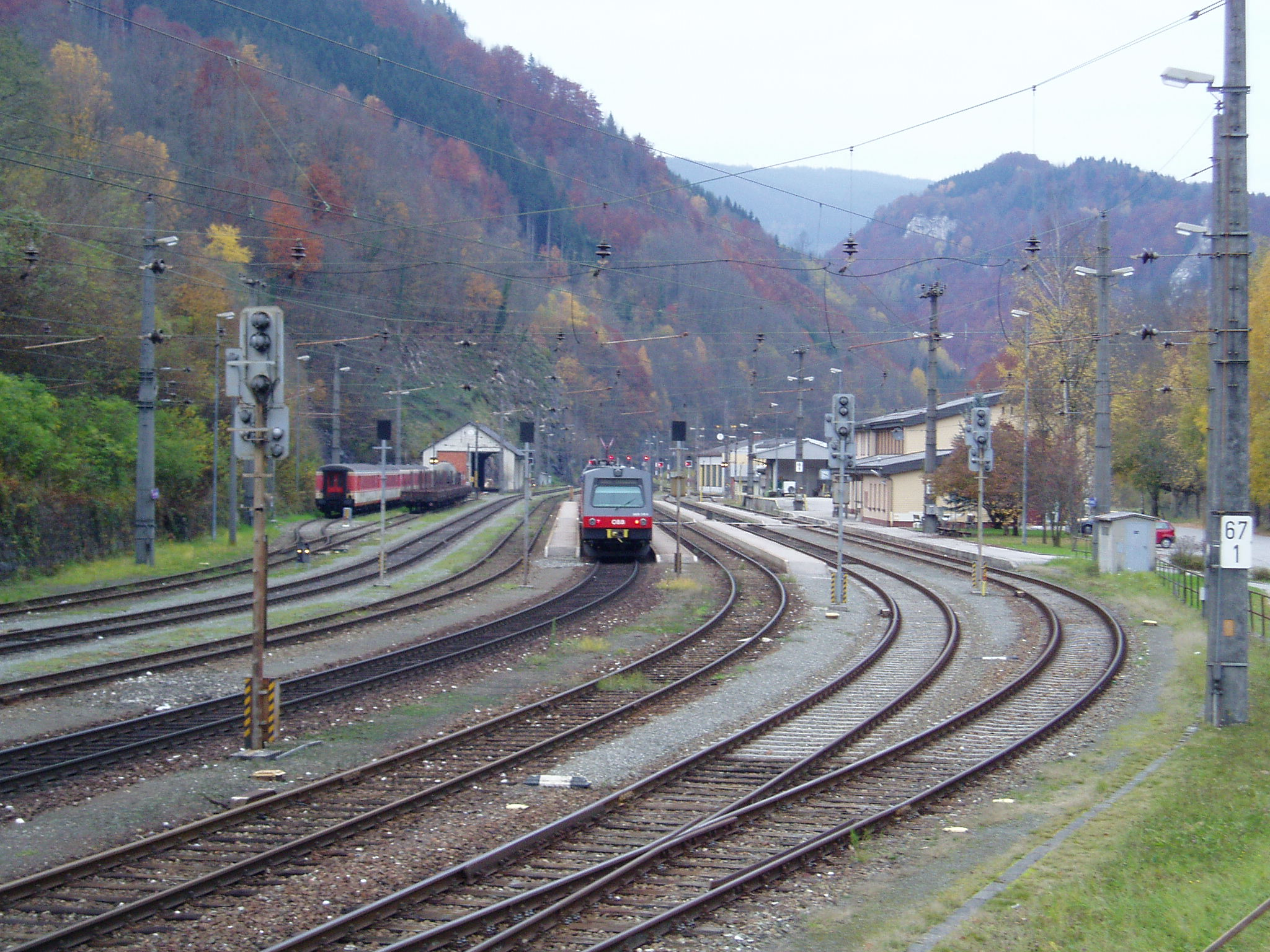
Kleinreifling station in autumn 2007, taken from south to north

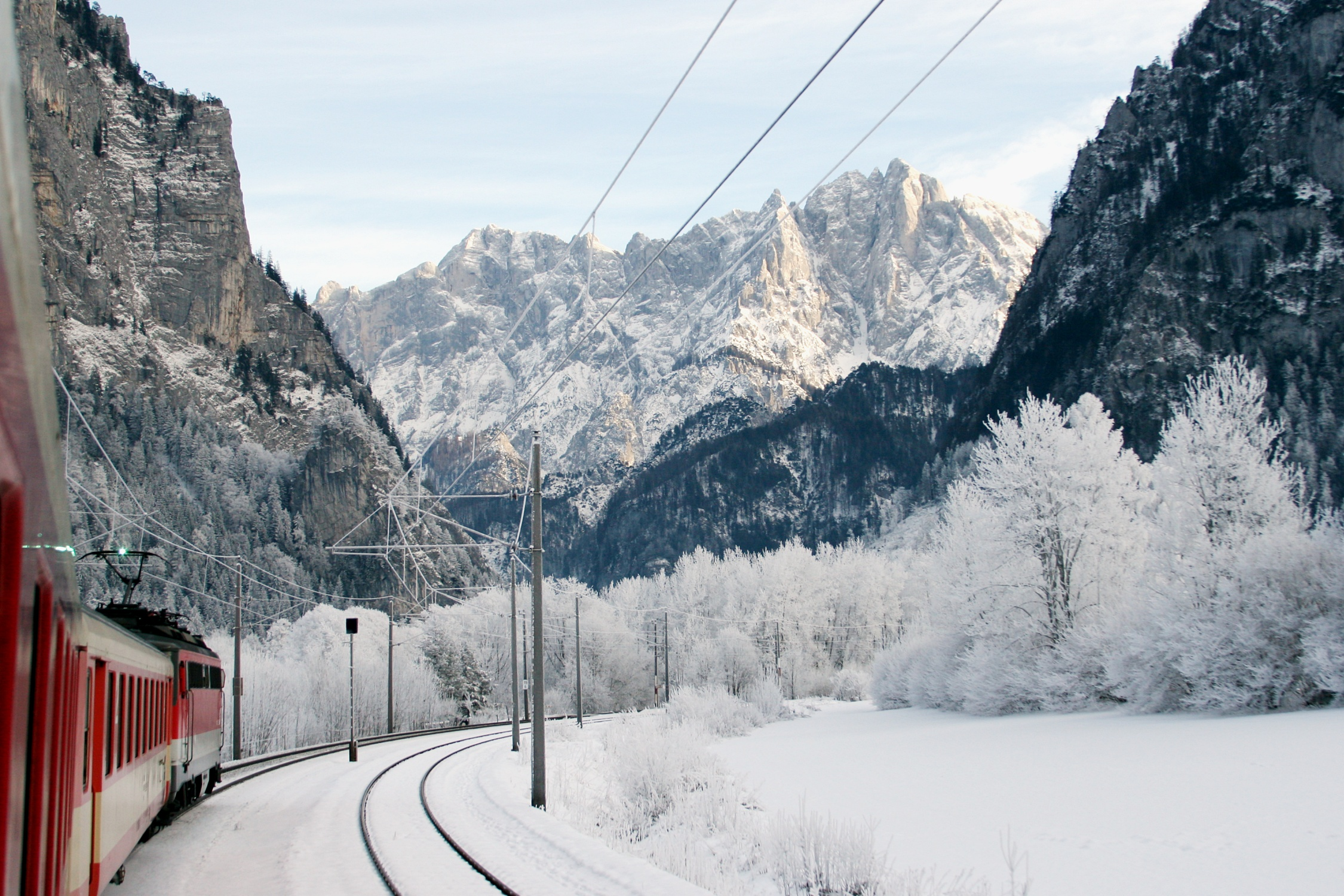
Winter in the former Gesäuse Eingang station (December 2004)

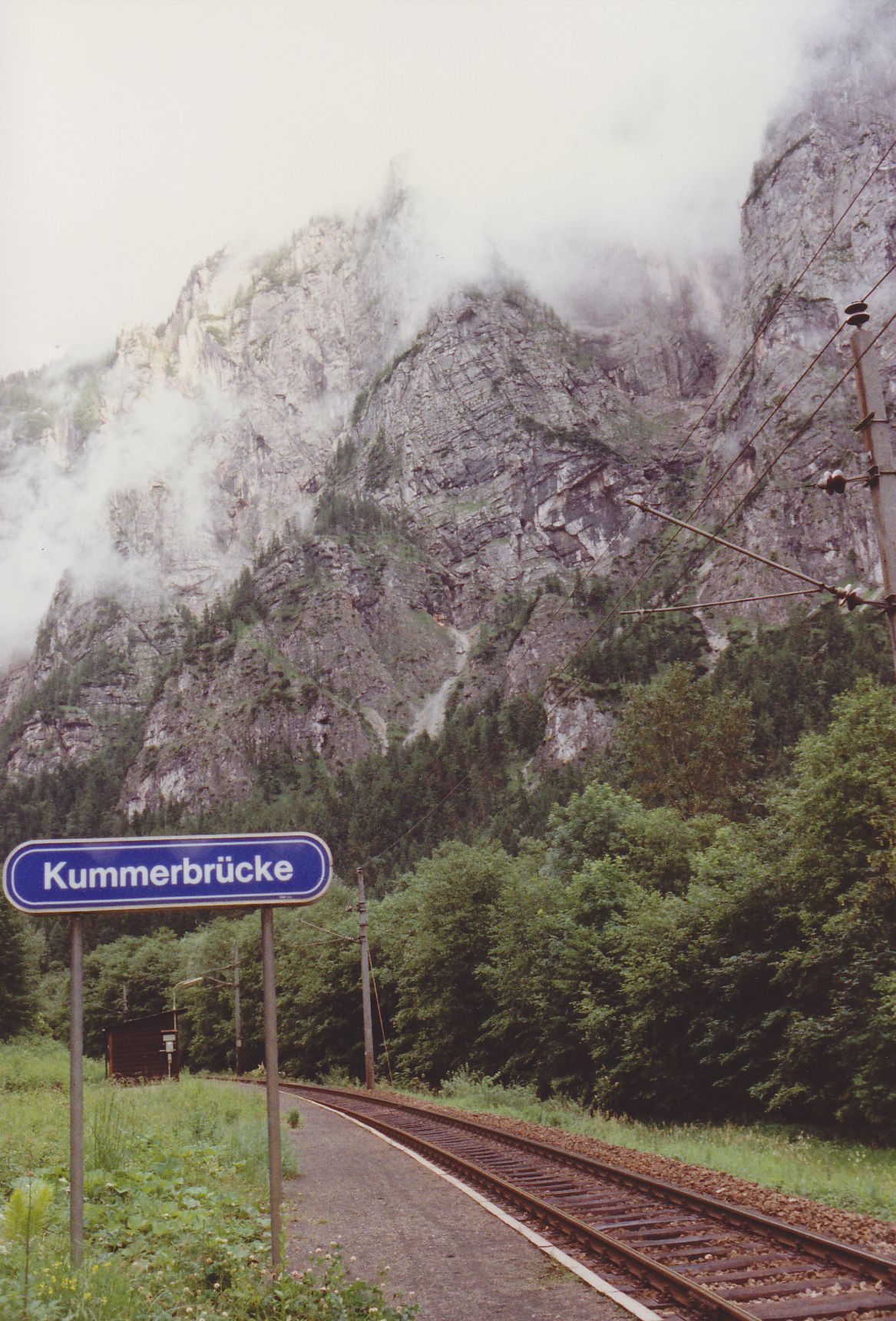
The former Kummerbrücke station (May 1988)

The Rudolf Railway formed the third north–south Alpine crossing in Austria along with the Southern Railway (Semmering railway) to the east and the Brenner Railway to the west. It was built by the Mährischen Eisenbauunternehmen (Moravian iron construction company) of the Klein brothers. The chief engineer was Otto Thienemann. Since there was too little traffic on its own line, the KRB was economically dependent to a large extent on through traffic and thus on the transport policy of other railways (mainly the Empress Elisabeth Railway—Kaiserin Elisabeth-Bahn; KEB). Both of the northern endpoints of the KRB network were on lines of the Empress Elisabeth Railway (St. Valentin and Amstetten on the Western Railway and Schärding on the Wels–Passau railway).

The financial situation of the KRB deteriorated after the economic crisis of 1873. The KRB was forced into administration in 1880 and it was nationalised in 1884.

After its nationalisation, the Amstetten–Kastenreith branch was upgraded because the Imperial Royal Austrian State Railways directed traffic between Vienna and Carinthia via the Western Railway and the Rudolf Railway (in competition with the still private Southern Railway). In the decades after the Second World War, direct trains from Vienna West still operated over this route.

The KRB connected to the Italian rail network south of Pontebba in the Canale valley.

== Current situation ==
All lines of the former Rudolf Railway in modern Austria belong to the Austrian Federal Railways.

Today the name Rudolf Railway is only used for the northern section, although the street name Rudolfsbahnstraße (Rudolf Railway Street) that occurs in some places along the line still refer to it. This is because the St. Valentin/Amstetten–Villach–Tarvisio route as such is no longer significant. The term Rudolfsbahn is used particularly for the Amstetten–Waidhofen–Kleinreifling–Selzthal route through the Ybbs and Enns valley (timetable route 130).

Individual sections of the original Rudolfsbahn now form parts of other lines. The Schober Pass line between Selzthal and St. Michael also forms part of the long-distance line between Linz and Graz via Selzthal (including the Pyhrn Railway) and the Innsbruck–Bischofshofen–Selzthal–Graz line (including the Enns Valley Railway). The Leoben–Klagenfurt line via St. Michael, the Neumarkt saddle and St. Veit an der Glan is now often considered to form part of the Southern Railway (although this is not historically correct): Vienna–Bruck an der Mur–Leoben–Klagenfurt–Villach. All Railjet and EuroCity services on the Vienna–Klagenfurt Hbf Villach Hbf route as well as some freight trains, which mainly go to Italy or Slovenia, use this section of the line (until the Koralm Railway opens).

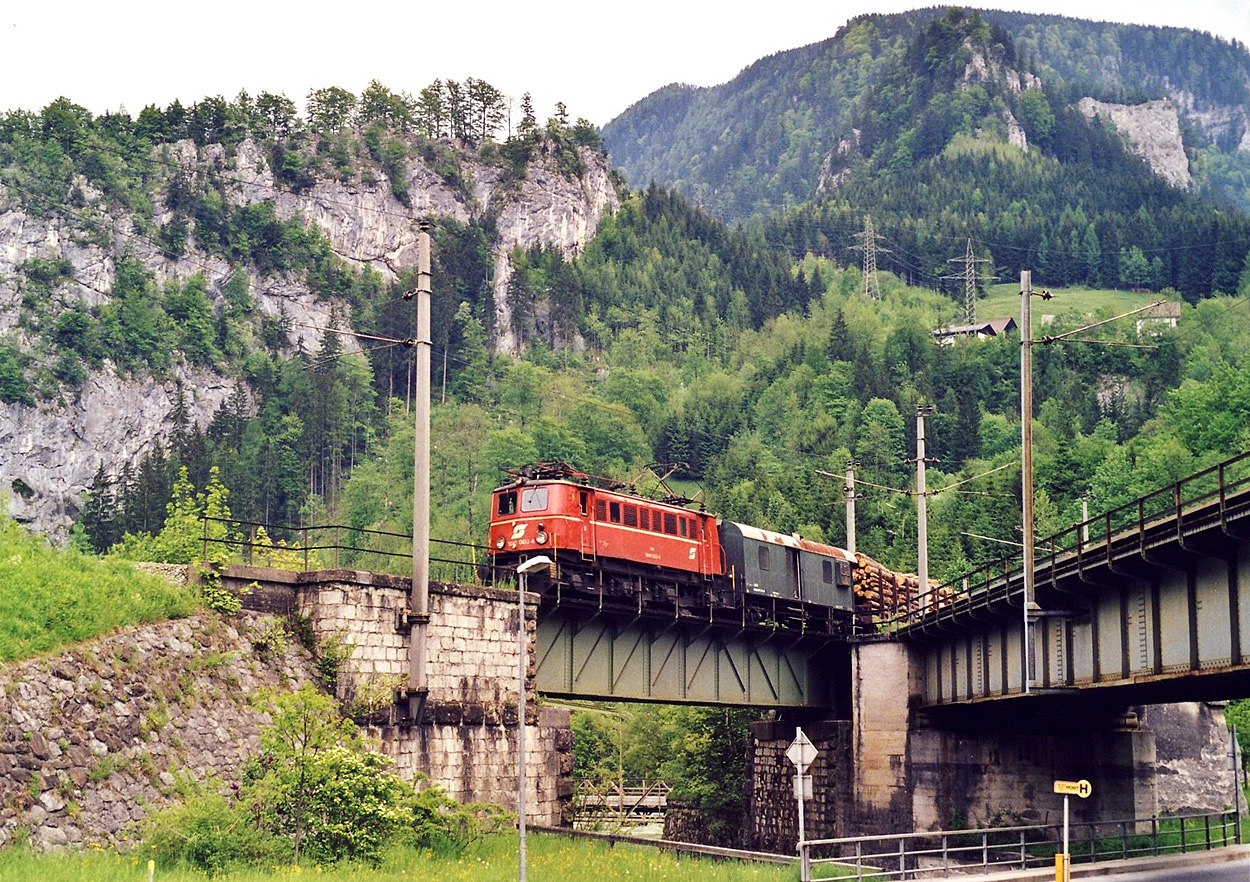
Freight train hauled by class 1040 locomotive in Hieflau. The line to Eisenerz branches off to the right (2001)

Between the stations of Friesach or St. Veit an der Glan and Villach (via Klagenfurt Hbf), the line was integrated into the S-Bahn Kärnten (Carinthian S-Bahn) as line S1 at the timetable change in December 2010. Line S2 of the Carinthian S-Bahn has been running between St. Veit an der Glan and Villach (via Feldkirchen in Kärnten) since December 2011. As part of the new S-Bahn operation, the frequency and the number of local trains have increased significantly, although in some cases this had already happened with the introduction of the Kärnten-Takt (Carinthian cycle) in December 2008. The St. Michael–Unzmarkt section has been part of the S8 of the S-Bahn Steiermark since December 2016.

=== Partial closure of passenger services ===
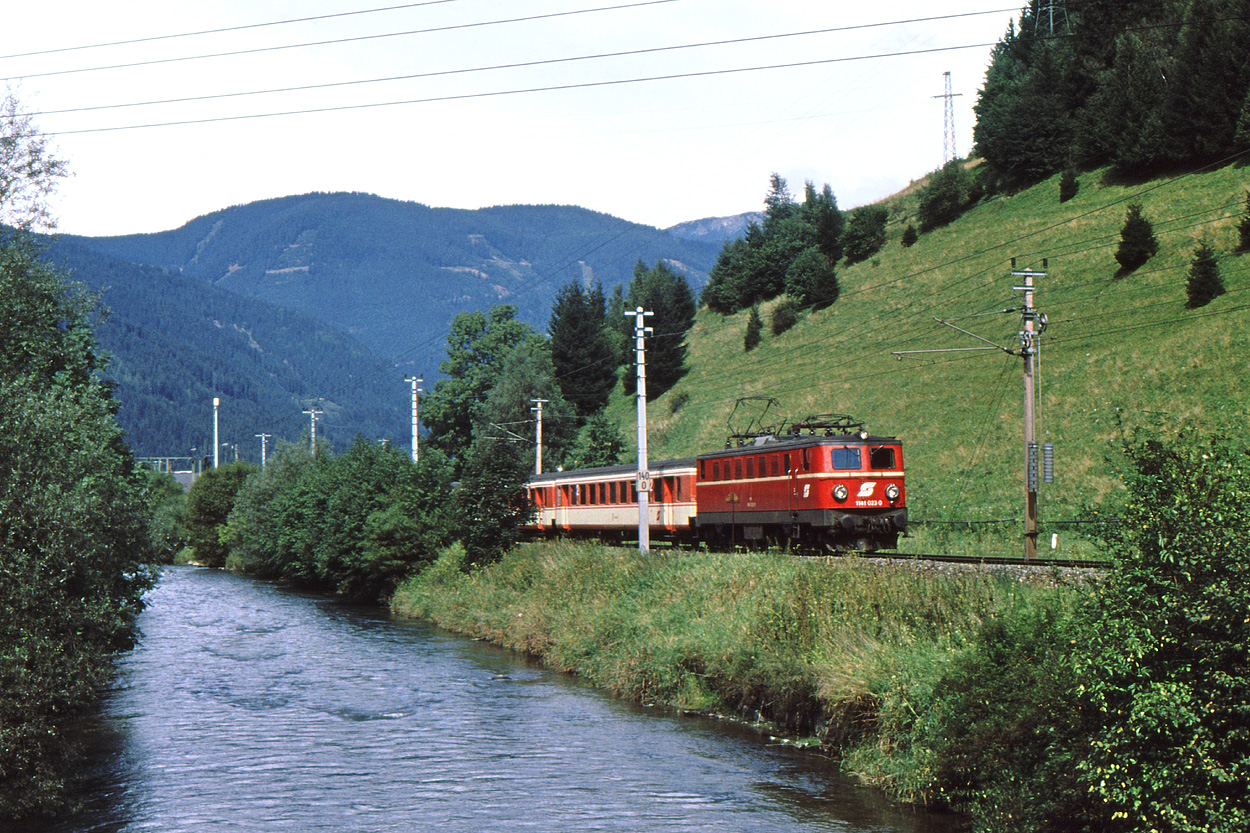
Regional train hauled by a class 1141 on the Schober pass route near Selzthal (1994)

Passenger traffic on the section between Selzthal and Weißenbach-St. Gallen was discontinued on 6 September 2009, with the exception of a pair of trains on Saturdays, Sundays and public holidays, as the ÖBB considered the route no longer economical for passenger traffic. It was replaced by a service with normal buses. A second pair of trains towards Selzthal in the afternoon and towards Weißenbach-St. Gallen in the morning was reintroduced at the start of the 2019/2020 timetable. In addition, both pairs of trains connect to/from Vienna West.

=== Amstetten–Kastenreith branch line ===
The Amstetten–Kleinreifling route is served every hour. In the mornings and evenings, some trains from Amstetten only run to Waidhofen a.d. Ybbs; on weekdays except Saturdays, some trains continue from Kleinreifling to Weißenbach-St.Gallen.

Until December 2017, trains from Eisenwurzen reached Amstetten mostly at 55 minutes after the hour and departed at 5 minutes after the hour. On the hour, there was a crossing of the Vienna–Salzburg Railjet services, which provided connections to Linz and Vienna. Since the private operator WESTbahn has been assigned the Railjet routes by ÖBB-Infrastruktur since December 2017, the meeting of ÖBB services on the hour in Amstetten has been abandoned. As the result of a new timetable concept geared towards Linz commuters and the replacement of most of the Bombardier Talent (class 4024) services with Siemens Desiro (class 4744) services, which have more rapid acceleration, connections are guaranteed at Amstetten to Linz in the morning and from Linz in the afternoon.

A regional train runs between Amstetten and Selzthal on weekends. It is the only passenger train that still serves the Gesäuse section.

== Notes and references ==
=== Sources ===
- Oberegger, Elmar (2007). Zur Geschichte der Kronprinz Rudolf-Bahn. Schärding/St.Valentin/Amstetten–Villach–Ljubljana (in German). Veröffentlichungen des Info-Büros für österreichische Eisenbahngeschichte 2/Sattledt.
- Tezak, Sepp (1991). Die Rudolfsbahn I (in German). Vol. 81. Vienna: Verlag Pospischil.
- Tezak, Sepp (1992). Die Rudolfsbahn II (in German). Vol. 82. Vienna: Verlag Pospischil.
- Gansrigler, Franz; Posch, Christoph (2008). Löffler, Detlef (ed.). Wien – Triest. Der Drang in den Süden: Von den Anfängen der Kronprinz-Rudolf-Bahn bis zum heutigen Ausbau der Südbahn und der Pontebbana (in German). Vienna, Graz, Klagenfurt: Styria-Verlag. ISBN 978-3-222-13257-5.
- Eisenbahnatlas Österreich [Railway atlas of Austria]. Schweers + Wall. 2010. ISBN 978-3-89494-138-3.
