= Sagrado =

Sagrado Sagrà (Venetian)
- Comune
- Comune di Sagrado
- Coat of arms

- Location within Italy Location within Friuli-Venezia Giulia
- Coordinates: 45°52′N 13°29′E
- Country: Italy
- Region: Friuli-Venezia Giulia
- Province: Gorizia (GO)
- Frazioni: Peteano, Poggio Terza Armata, San Martino del Carso

Government
  - Mayor: Elisabetta Pian

Area
  - Total: 14.1 km^{2} (5.4 sq mi)
- Elevation: 32 m (105 ft)

Population (2008)
  - Total: 2,234
  - Density: 158/km^{2} (410/sq mi)
- Demonym: Sagradini
- Time zone: UTC+1 (CET)
  - Summer (DST): UTC+2 (CEST)
- Postal code: 34078
- Dialing code: 0481
- Patron saint: St. Nicholas
- Saint day: December 6
- Website: Official website

Sagrado (Italian: [saˈɡraːdo]; Bisiacco: Sagrà; Friulian: Segrât; Slovene: Zagraj) is a comune (municipality) in the decentralized regional entity of Gorizia in the Italian region of Friuli-Venezia Giulia, located about 35 kilometres (22 mi) northwest of Trieste and about 13 kilometres (8 mi) southwest of Gorizia, on the left bank of the Isonzo River.

Sagrado is nearby the Monte San Michele, the seat of fierce fightings between Italy and Austria-Hungary during World War I.

== Transport ==
Sagrado railway station is served by trains to Trieste, Udine, Treviso and Venice.

== Twin towns ==
- Branik, Slovenia
- Győrság, Hungary
- Poggersdorf, Austria
