= Cormons railway station =

Railway station in Friuli-Venezia Giulia, Italy

Cormons

General information
- Location: Via A.De Gasperi 16, Cormons, Friuli-Venezia Giulia; Italy
- Coordinates: 45°57′26″N 13°27′42″E
- System: Railway Station
- Owner: Rete Ferroviaria Italiana
- Operator: Trenitalia
- Line: Udine–Trieste railway
- Distance: 20.785 km (12.915 mi) from Udine
- Platforms: 3
- Tracks: 8

Other information
- Classification: Silver
Location
- Location within Friuli-Venezia Giulia Location within Northern Italy Location within Italy

Cormons (Italian: Stazione di Cormons) is a railway station serving the town of Cormons, in the region of Friuli-Venezia Giulia, northern Italy. The station is located on the Udine–Trieste railway. The train services are operated by Trenitalia.

== History ==
The station should have been located on the Cormons-Redipuglia railway, however construction of the line never finished and therefore trains never ran on this line. Until 1918 it was one of the last Austro Hungarian stations before the border with Italy, the latter ran along Iudrio River. Its Habsburg heritage is visible by the building style.

== Train services ==
The station is served by the following service(s):

- Express services (Regionale Veloce) Venice - Gorizia - Udine - Treviso - Trieste
- Regional services (Treno regionale) Venice - Gorizia - Udine - Treviso - Trieste

== See also ==
- History of rail transport in Italy
- List of railway stations in Friuli-Venezia Giulia
- Rail transport in Italy
- Railway stations in Italy
