= Mirko Gruden =

Italian footballer

Personal information
- Date of birth: June 22, 1911
- Place of birth: Monfalcone, Italy
- Date of death: 12 September 1967 (aged 56)
- Place of death: Grado, Friuli-Venezia Giulia, Italy
- Height: 1.78 m (5 ft 10 in)
- Position: Midfielder

Senior career*
| Years | Team | Apps | (Gls) |
| 1928–1931 | Pro Gorizia | | |
| 1931–1932 | Legnano | 32 | (0) |
| 1932–1933 | Ambrosiana-Inter | 1 | (0) |
| 1933–1935 | Palermo | 56 | (1) |
| 1935–1937 | Genova 1893 | 20 | (0) |
| 1937–1938 | Venezia | 17 | (1) |
| 1938–1939 | Pro Gorizia | | |
| 1939–1940 | Catania | 5 | (0) |
| 1940–1943 | Monfalcone | | |
- * Club domestic league appearances and goals

Mirko Gruden (June 22, 1911 - September 12, 1967) was an Italian professional football player.
