= Enns Valley Railway =

Bischofshofen–Selzthal
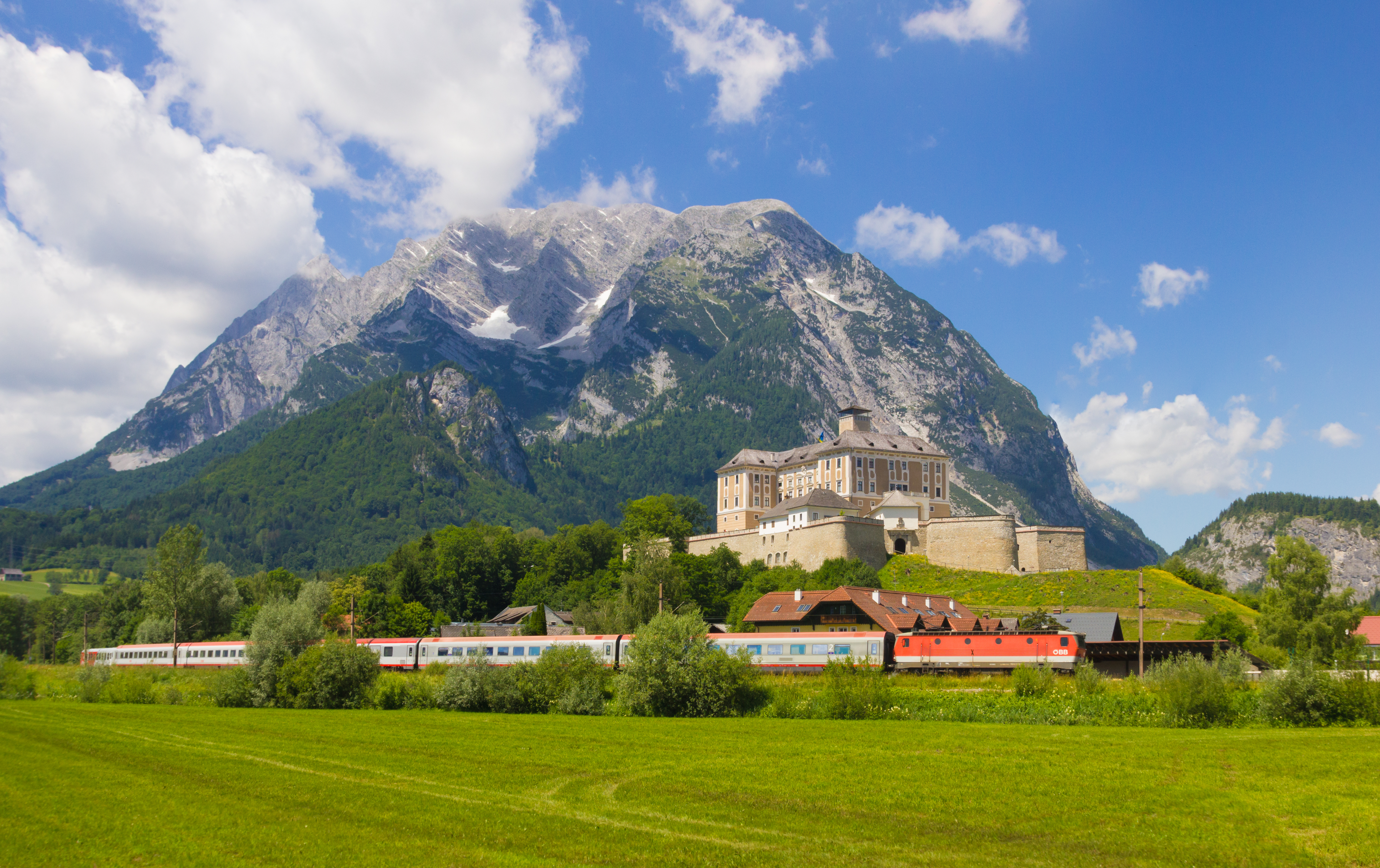
- IC train near Trautenfels.

Overview
- Line number: 102 01

Service
- Route number: 250

Technical
- Line length: 98.6 km (61.3 mi) (Double-track railway: Stainach-Irdning–Liezen 1 turnout )
- Track gauge: 1,435 mm (4 ft 8 1/2 in)
- Minimum radius: 233 m (764 ft)
- Electrification: 15 kV 16.7 Hz AC
- Operating speed: 110 km/h (68 mph) max.
- Maximum incline: 2.4 %

The Enns Valley Railway (German: Ennstalbahn) is an electrified, standard gauge main line railway in the Austrian states of Styria and Salzburg. It was originally built and operated by the Empress Elisabeth Railway Company. The line is an important link for the two Austrian states, West Austria and Germany.
