= Udine–Trieste railway =

Railway line in Italy

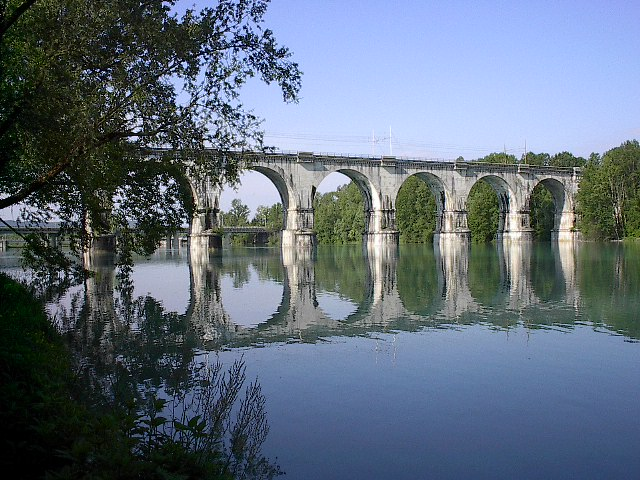
- The Gorizia railway bridge in 2006, part of the Udine-Trieste railway

Overview
- Line number: 64
- Termini: Udine; Trieste Centrale

Service
- Type: heavy rail
- Operator(s): Rete Ferroviaria Italiana

History
- Opened: 1860

Technical
- Line length: 82.683 km (51.377 mi)
- Number of tracks: 2
- Track gauge: 1,435 mm (4 ft 8 1/2 in) standard gauge
- Electrification: 3 kV DC, overhead line
- Operating speed: 180 km/h (110 mph)

The Udine–Trieste railway is an Italian state railway line that connects Udine and Trieste running through the central and eastern part of Friuli-Venezia Giulia.

The whole line is double track and electrified at 3000 Volts DC. The only station that serves as an interchange with other lines is Monfalcone, which is near the junction with the Venice–Trieste railway: the Monfalcone–Trieste section is shared with this line.

The railway infrastructure is managed by the Rete Ferroviaria Italiana, which classifies it as one of its primary lines, while both regional and long-distance passenger traffic is managed by Trenitalia. The railway is used by the freight trains of various railway companies.

== History ==
Section	Opened
Trieste–Galleria junction	28 July 1857 (Note: Part of the Austrian Southern Railway.)
Galleria junction–Cormons	1 October 1860
Cormons–Udine	3 October 1860

The line dates back to the times of the Austrian Empire, because its government wanted to connect its capital of Vienna with the Kingdom of Lombardy–Venetia.

The Vienna–Trieste (Südbahn) and Venice–Trieste (Ferdinandsbahn) lines were completed in 1857.

The Udine–Trieste railway, opened in 1860, ran from Aurisina (later called Nabresina) near Trieste to Udine. The western section of the Venice–Udine railway between Udine and Casarsa, including the bridge over the Tagliamento, was opened at the same time.

In 1866, after Lombardy had been annexed to the Kingdom of Sardinia, Veneto was also annexed to the Kingdom of Italy following the Austro-Prussian War. The line thus became an international railway and Cormons station became a border station. The whole line became Italian In 1918.

Duplication between Mossa and Rubbia was completed on 13 March 1988 and the next section between Rubbia and Sagrado on 8 April 1990.
