= Udine railway station =

Railway station in Udine, Italy

Udine
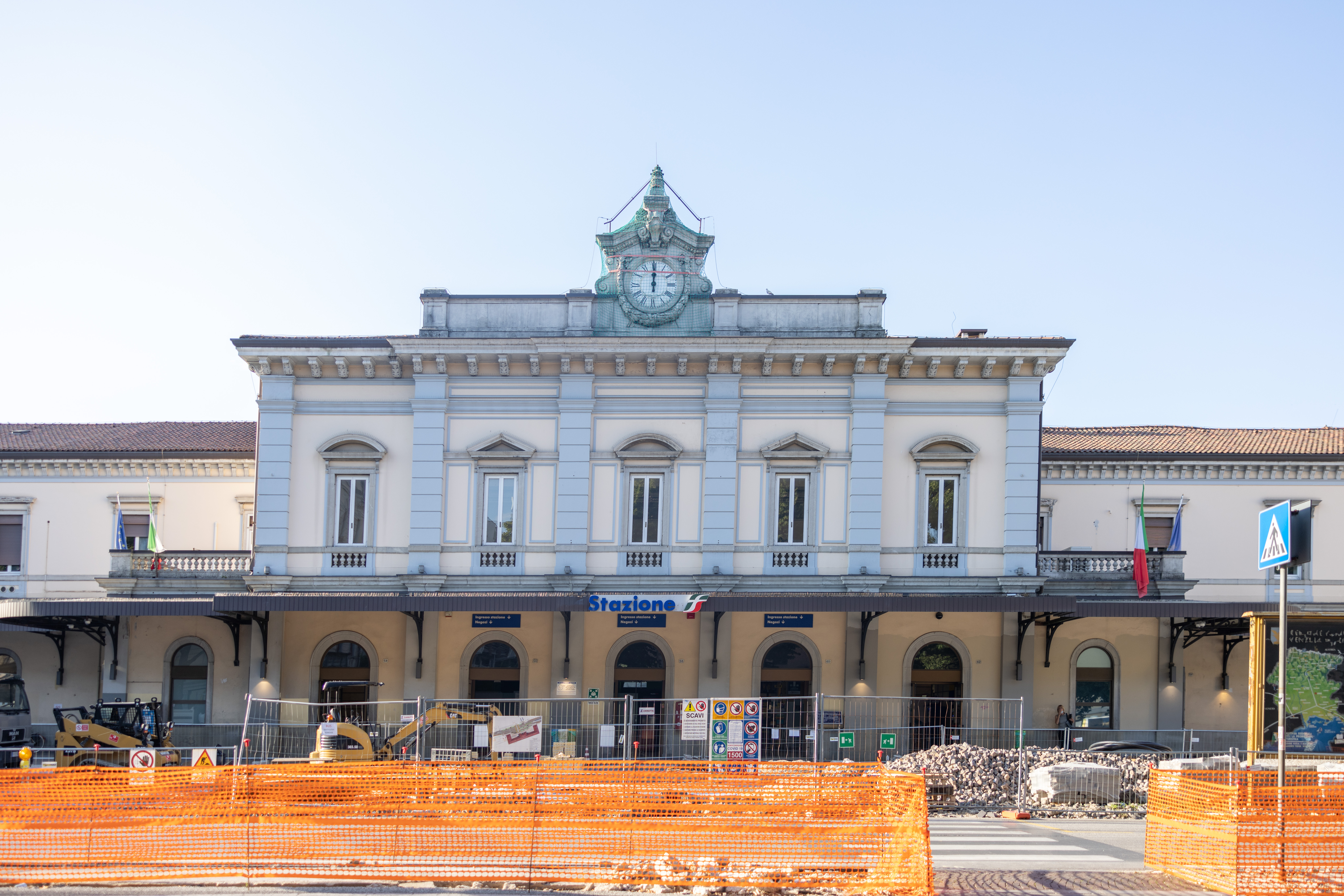
- The main entrance

General information
- Location: Viale Europa Unita; 33100 Udine UD; Udine, Udine, Friuli-Venezia Giulia; Italy
- Coordinates: 46°03′22″N 13°14′30″E
- Elevation: +110 m
- Operator: Rete Ferroviaria Italiana; Centostazioni
- Lines: Venice–Udine; Udine–Trieste; Tarvisio–Udine; Udine–Cervignano; Udine–Cividale
- Distance: 126 km (78 mi) from Venezia Mestre
- Train operators: Trenitalia; ÖBB; Ferrovie Udine-Cividale
- Connections: Urban (SAF) Suburban buses

Other information
- Classification: Gold

History
- Opened: 21 July 1860; 166 years ago
Location
- Location within Friuli-Venezia Giulia Location within Northern Italy Location within Italy

Udine railway station (Italian: Stazione di Udine) serves the city and comune of Udine, in the autonomous region of Friuli-Venezia Giulia, northeastern Italy. Opened in 1860, it is a junction of five lines, to Venice, Trieste, Tarvisio, Cervignano and Cividale, respectively.

The station is currently managed by Rete Ferroviaria Italiana (RFI). However, the commercial area of the passenger building is managed by Centostazioni. Each of these companies is a subsidiary of Ferrovie dello Stato Italiane (FS), Italy's state-owned rail company. Train services to and from the station are operated by Trenitalia, ÖBB and Ferrovie Udine-Cividale.

== Location ==
Udine railway station is situated in Viale Europa Unita, at the southern edge of the city centre.

== History ==
The station commenced operations on 21 July 1860, upon the inauguration of the Cormons–Udine section of the Venice–Udine railway. Only a few months later, on 3 October 1860, it also became the terminus of the Udine–Trieste railway, in conjunction with the opening of the Cormons–Udine section of that line.

Under the management of Centostazioni, the passenger building underwent a restoration and renovation completed in 2005. The construction work focused on the modernization of the main hall, the construction of a new ticket office and the new information centre. In addition, some spaces were created for commercial use.

== Features ==
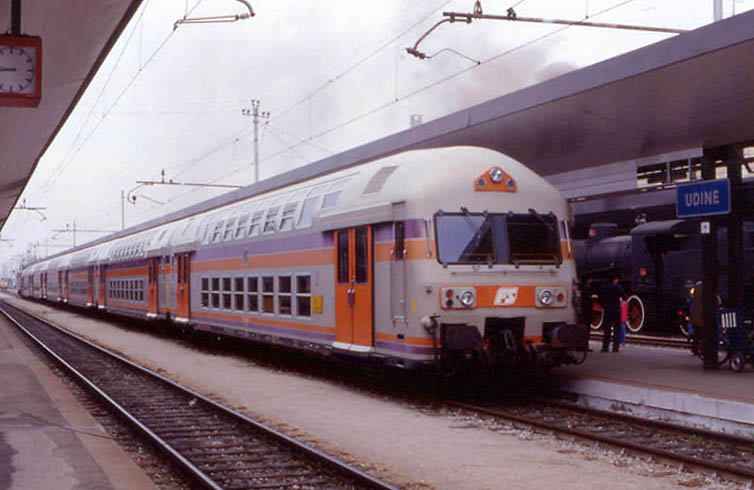
An FS regional train at Udine, 1997

The station has a large passenger building that houses many services, including ticketing, two newsagents, bars, a bank, a chapel, a pharmacy, the shops, the Eurostar Club and the headquarters of the Railway Police.

In addition, there are offices of Trenitalia and the station manager. At one time the station was also the home of a military command.

The station yard is equipped with 7 tracks for passenger service (numbered 1 to 8), plus a few tracks for the exclusive use of freight handling, shunting, stabling and storage, including track number 2 which has no platform.

Up to 1 December 2008, the station was equipped with a locomotive shed and workshops.

== Passenger and train movements ==
The movement of passengers at the station is about 7.6 million people a year, which means that the station is the busiest in Friuli-Venezia Giulia in terms of numbers of passengers.

In the station, there are all types of trains for different destinations.

Directly outside the station, in the square, are bus stops for all bus routes to Udine. A few hundred metres away is the bus station, which is a terminus for suburban services. In front of the station is a taxi stand.

== Train services ==
The station is served by the following service(s):

- High speed services (Frecciarossa) Udine - Treviso - Venice - Padua - Bologna - Florence - Rome
- High speed services (Frecciarossa) Udine - Treviso - Venice - Padua - Verona - Milan
- High speed services (Railjet) Vienna - Klagenfurt - Villach - Udine - Treviso - Venice
- Night train (CityNightLine) Munich - Tarvisio - Udine - Treviso - Venice
- Night train (EuroNight) Vienna - Linz - Salzburg - Villach - Udine - Treviso - Venice
- Night train (Intercity Notte) Trieste - Udine - Venice - Padua - Bologna - Rome
- Express services (Regionale Veloce) Trieste - Gorizia - Udine - Treviso - Venice
- Regional services (Treno regionale) Trieste - Gorizia - Udine - Treviso - Venice
- Regional services (REX) Villach - Tarvisio - Carnia - Gemona del Friuli - Udine
- Regional services (Treno regionale) Tarvisio - Carnia - Gemona del Friuli - Udine - Cervignano del Friuli - Trieste
- Local services (Treno regionale) Udine - Cividale del Friuli

== See also ==
- History of rail transport in Italy
- List of railway stations in Friuli-Venezia Giulia
- Rail transport in Italy
- Railway stations in Italy
